= Mercedes-Benz CLA =

Series of subcompact luxury cars produced by Mercedes-Benz

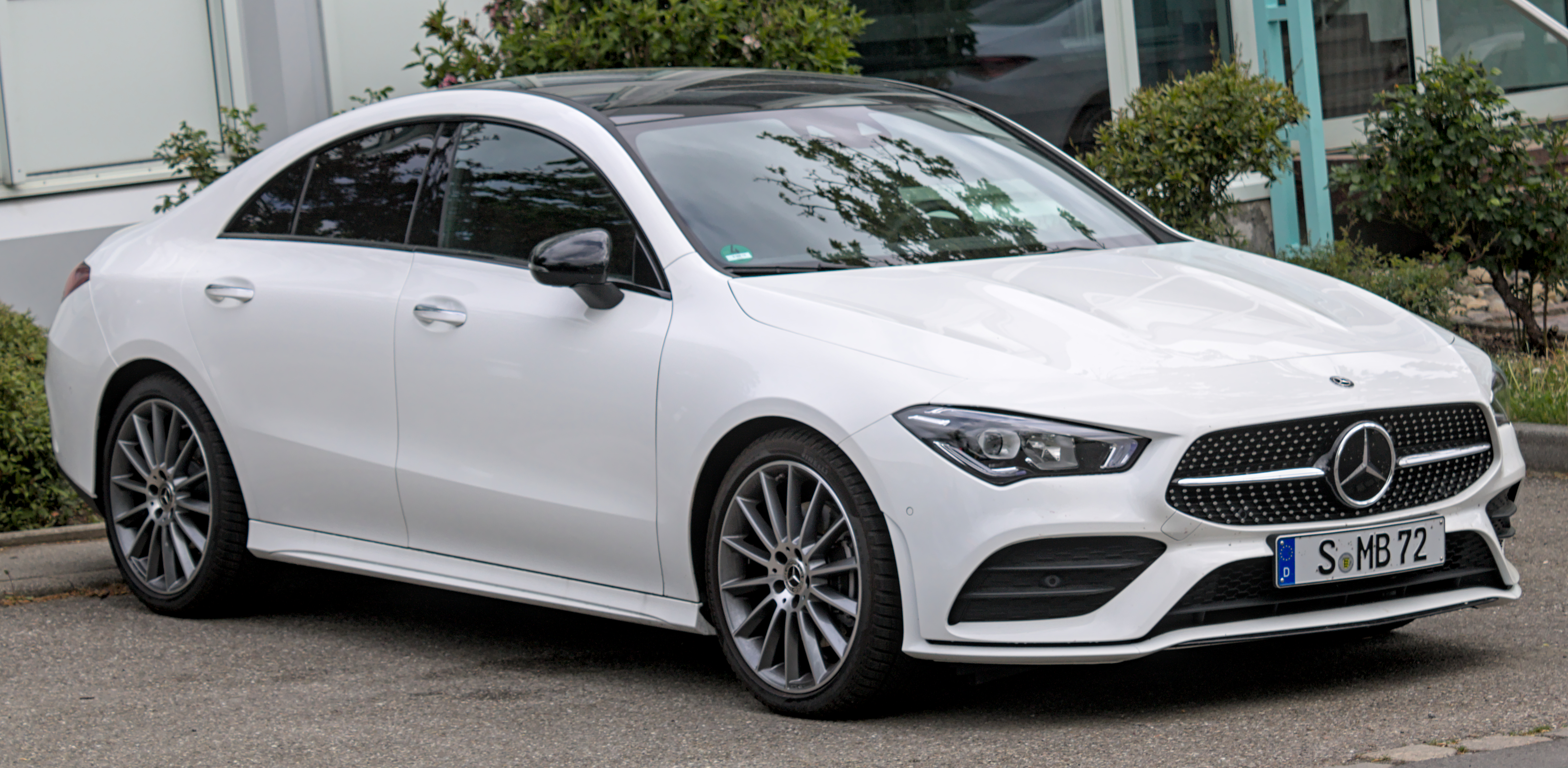

Overview
- Manufacturer: Daimler AG (2013–2022); Mercedes-Benz Group (2022–present)
- Production: 2013–present

Body and chassis
- Class: Subcompact executive car (C)
- Body style: 4-door saloon; 5-door estate (Shooting Brake)
- Layout: Front-engine, front-wheel-drive; Front-engine, all-wheel-drive (4Matic)

The Mercedes-Benz CLA is a series of luxury subcompact executive cars manufactured by Mercedes-Benz since 2013. The first generation was a four-door sedan based on the platform of the W176 A-Class and W246 B-Class compact cars, marketed as a four-door coupé. In 2015, Mercedes-Benz expanded the CLA family to include a station wagon configuration which it markets as a Shooting Brake.

The CLA is Mercedes-Benz's first front-wheel drive vehicle offered in the American market. The CLA range is positioned above the A-Class and it is nearly on the level of the C-Class in the Mercedes model range, and models tend to be less practical than the A-Class it is based on.

The CLA first went on sale in Europe in April 2013, and was subsequently introduced in the United States in September 2013. Its largest markets are Western Europe and the United States. Global cumulative CLA sales reached 100,000 during its first year, cited as "our best launch in 20 years" by Mercedes-Benz. Worldwide, Mercedes-Benz sold about 750,000 units of the first generation.

== First generation (C117; 2013) ==
First generation
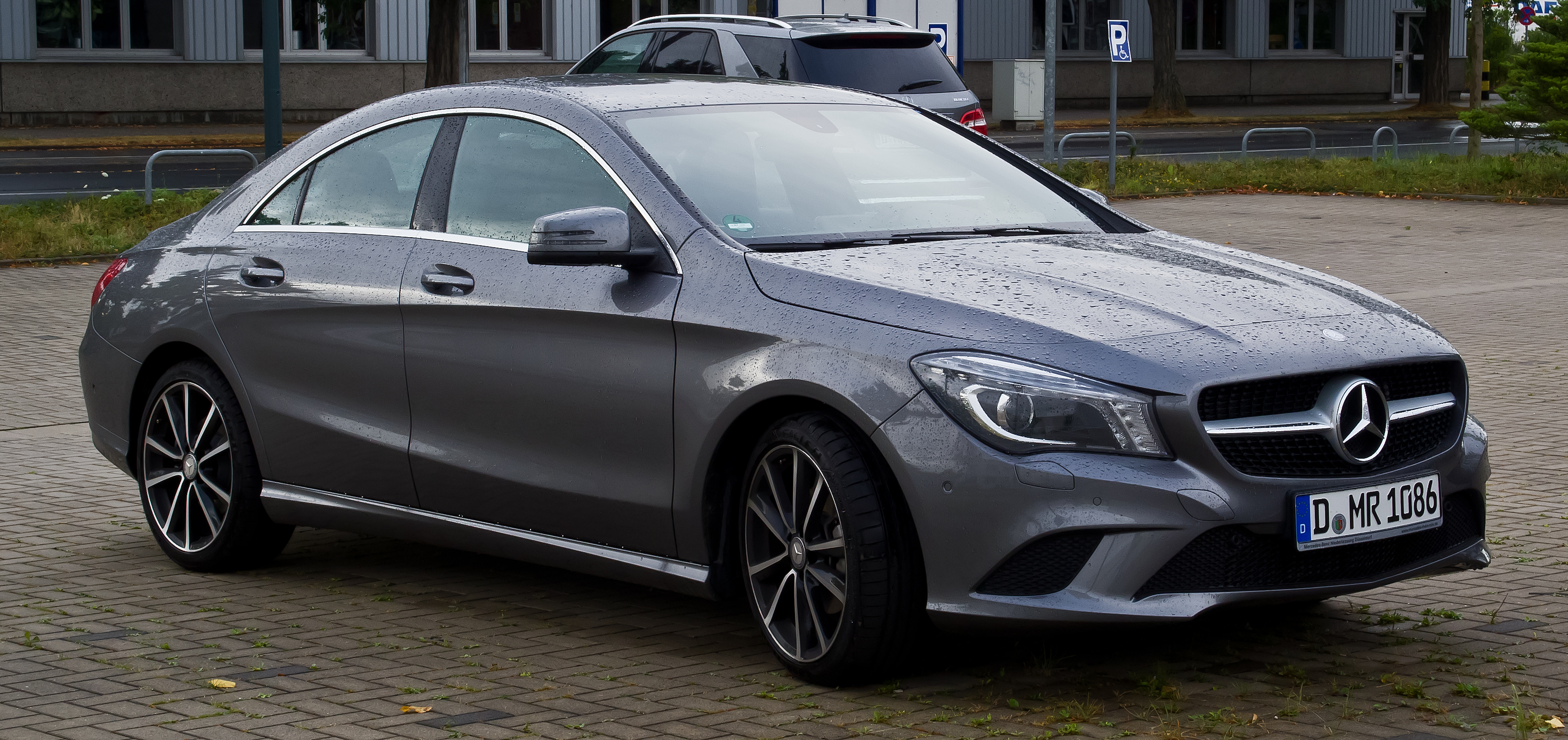
- Mercedes-Benz CLA 180 (pre-facelift)

Overview
- Model code: C117; X117 (shooting brake)
- Production: 2013–2019
- Assembly: Hungary: Kecskemét (Mercedes-Benz Manufacturing Hungary); India: Chakan (MBI); Thailand: Samut Prakan (TAAP)
- Designer: Mark Fetherston; Robert Lešnik (2010)

Body and chassis
- Platform: MFA
- Related: Mercedes-Benz A-Class (W176); Mercedes-Benz B-Class (W246); Mercedes-Benz GLA (X156)

Powertrain
- Engine: Petrol: 1.6 L M270 turbo I4; 2.0 L M270 turbo I4; 2.0 L M133 turbo I4; Diesel: 1.5 L OM607 turbo I4; 1.8 L OM651 turbo I4; 2.1 L OM651 turbo I4
- Transmission: 6-speed manual 7-speed DCT

Dimensions
- Wheelbase: 2,699 mm (106.3 in)
- Length: 4,630 mm (182.3 in)
- Width: 1,777 mm (70.0 in)
- Height: 1,437 mm (56.6 in)
- Curb weight: 1,430–1,540 kg (3,153–3,395 lb)

=== Development and launch ===
The design of the C117 CLA is based on the Concept Style Coupe concept unveiled by Mercedes-Benz at the 2012 Avant/Garde Diaries event in Los Angeles, followed by the 2012 Auto China, and Huashan 1914 Creative Park. It is a four-door fastback coupe, based on the platform of the W176 A-Class and W246 B-Class compact cars. The production version C117 CLA was publicly unveiled at the 2013 North American International Auto Show, with sales commencing in September 2013.

Trial production of the CLA at the Kecskemét plant at southeast of Budapest, Hungary started in 2012, with production at Kecskemét plant beginning in January 2013.

Mercedes claimed that the C117 would be the most aerodynamic production vehicle on sale with a Cd=0.23, beating the previous most-aerodynamic, the Tesla Model S with Cd=0.24. The CLA 180 CDI Blue Efficiency was claimed to be even more aerodynamic with a Cd=0.22. However, independent measurement by Car and Driver Magazine in May 2014 bore out Tesla's claim by exactly confirming a drag coefficient of Cd=0.24, putting Mercedes' claim into question by measuring the CLA at Cd=0.30. The test done by Car And Driver was in turn criticized for being imprecise as to which model variant of the CLA was tested and which variant was advertised featuring a Cd=0.23.

The C117 CLA was also the first front-wheel drive vehicle ever offered by Mercedes-Benz in the U.S. market.

The 2015 model included updated infotainment with a bigger central screen and an updated head unit with iPhone interface as standard, Collision Prevention Assist Plus autonomous braking made standard and an extra 5 kW for the CLA 220 CDI. Furthermore, the 2016 model brought Carplay as an option to the CLA. A facelift was introduced for the CLA model range in 2017, offering new restyled headlights and restyled taillights with available bold LED lighting.

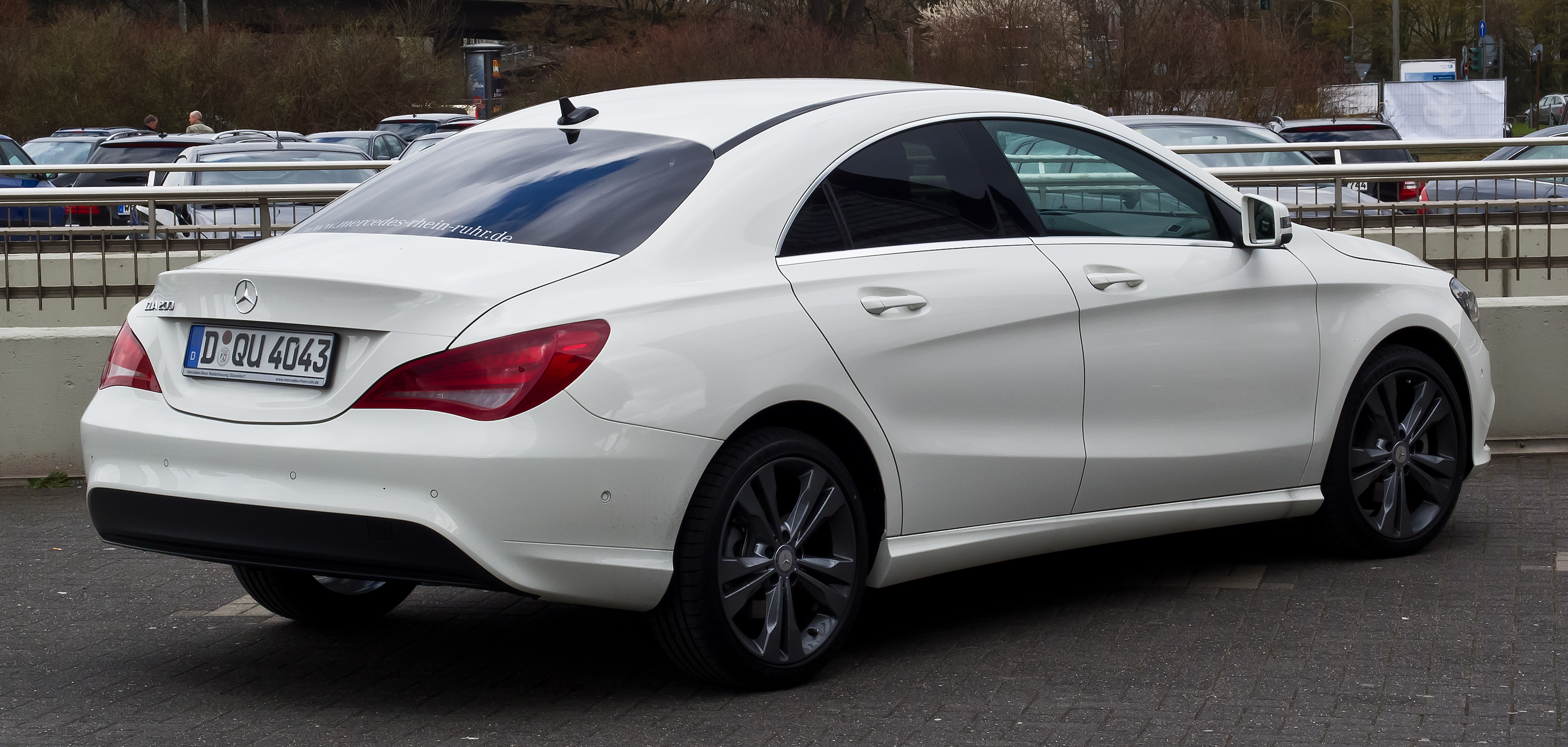
Mercedes-Benz CLA 200 (pre-facelift)

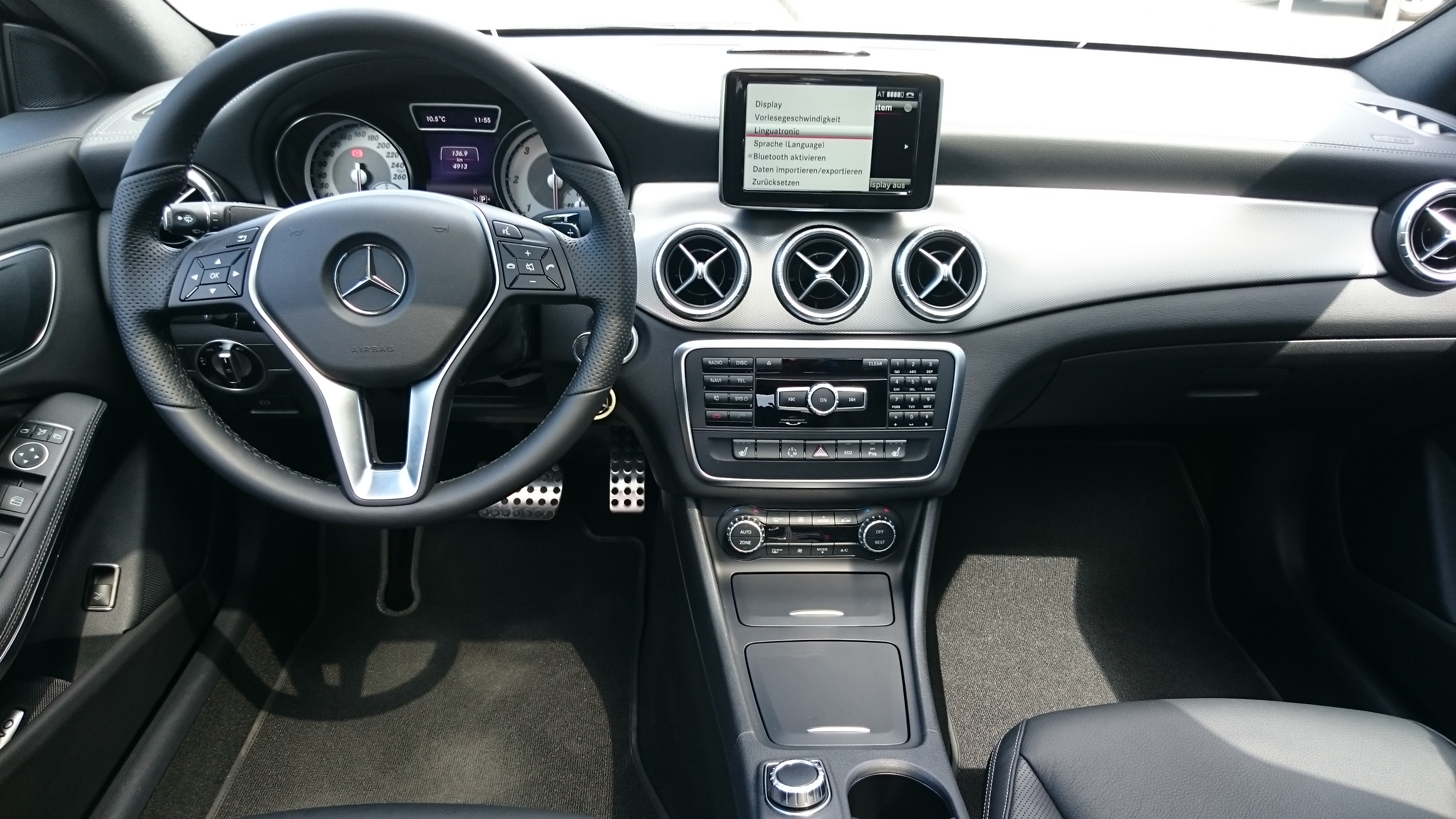
Interior

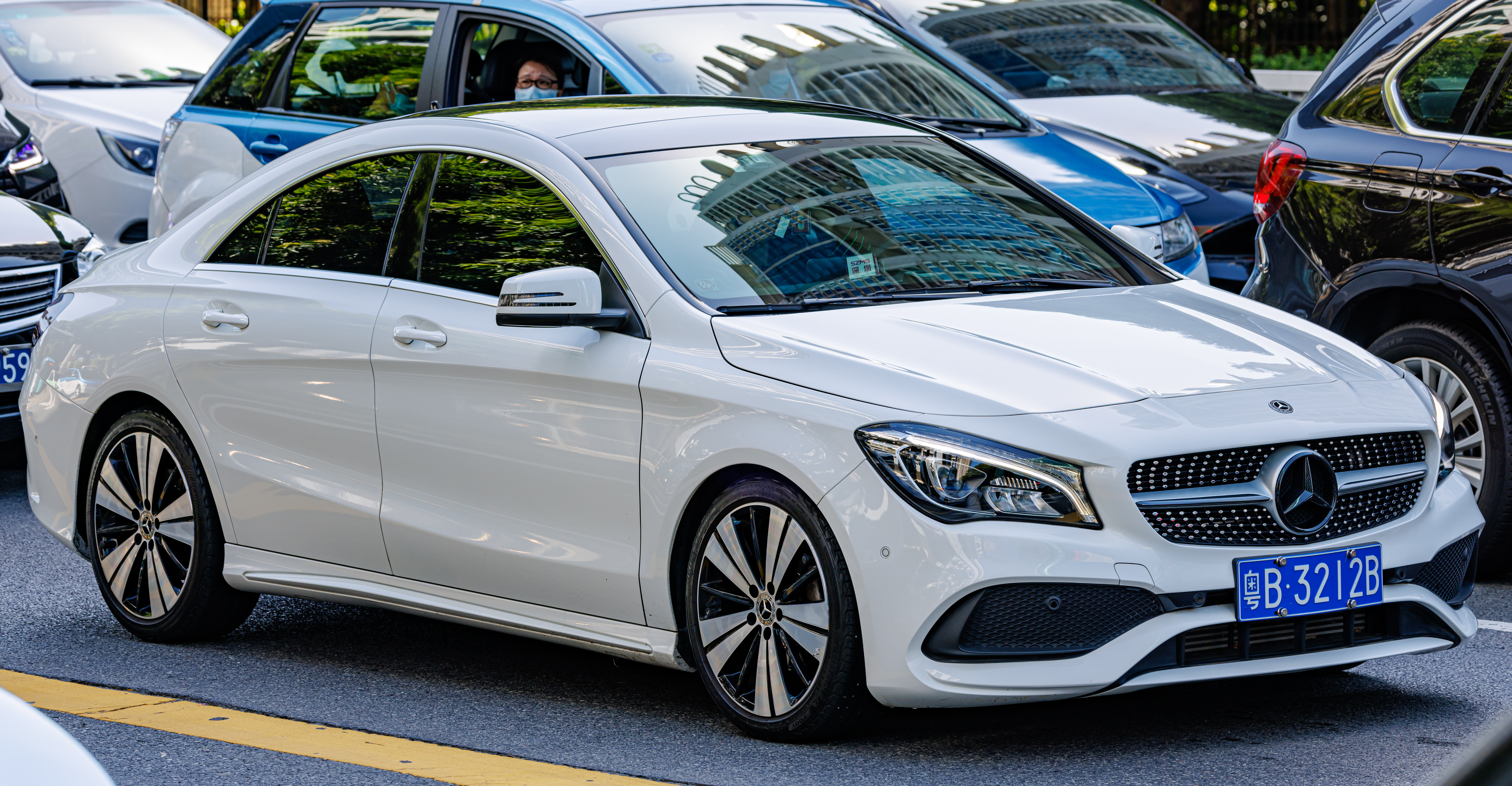
Mercedes-Benz CLA 200 (facelift)

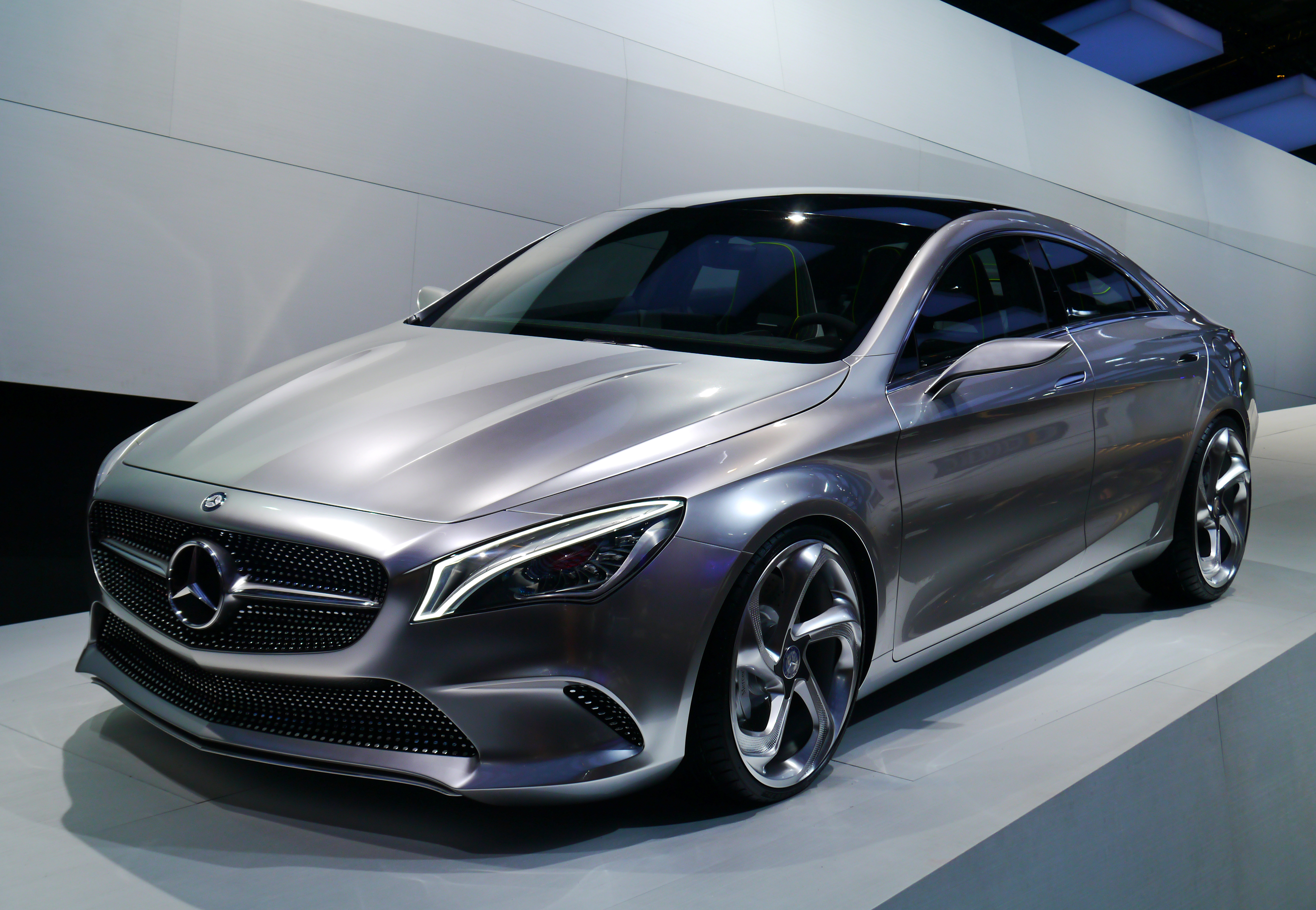
Concept Style Coupé at the 2012 Paris Auto Show

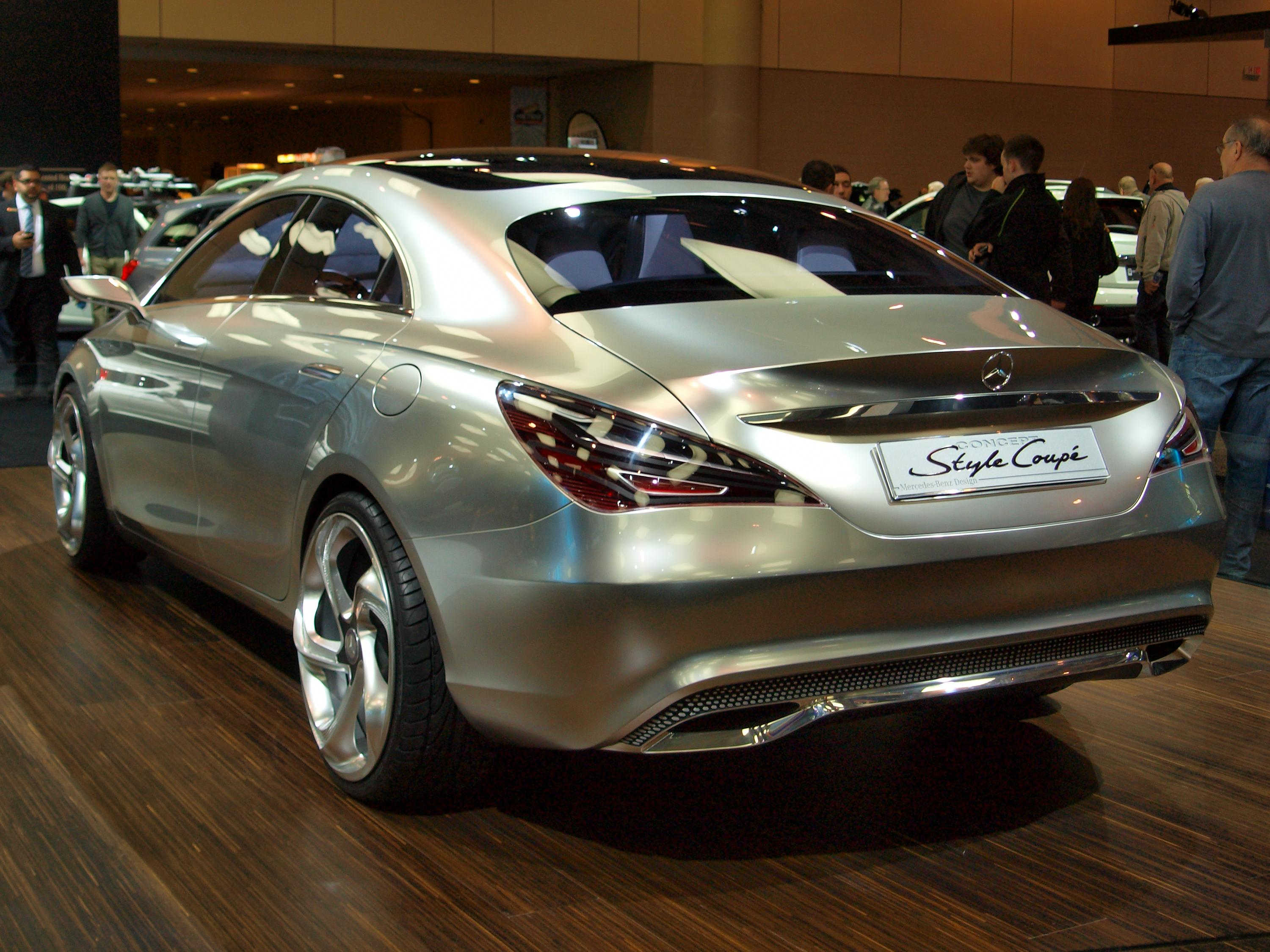
Concept Style Coupé

=== Initial release ===
==== CLA Edition 1 (2013–2015) ====
Available in CLA 180, CLA 200, CLA 250, CLA 220 CDI, they are versions of the respective CLA models with a choice of five body colours: mountain grey, cosmos black, night black, cirrus white or designo polar silver magno (expected to be available from the third quarter of 2013). The Edition 1 features AMG front and rear aprons, AMG side sill panels, black painted multi-spoke AMG light-alloy wheels, diamond-style radiator grille with black fin and chrome inserts, bi-xenon headlamps, lowered sports suspension, exclusive NEON ART interior, sports seats upholstered in leather and black microfibre DINAMICA with yellow stitching, instrument panel and the beltlines upholstered in ARTICO man-made leather with yellow stitching, trim elements in aluminium with a light longitudinal grain, and a three-spoke multifunction sports steering wheel with a flattened bottom section and perforations in the grip area. The vehicles went on sale for the twelve months after the launch of CLA vehicles.

==== CLA 180 BlueEFFICIENCY Edition (2013–2019) ====
It is a version of CLA 180 with reduced fuel consumption. Drag coefficient value was reduced to 0.22 via low A-pillar shoulder with adapted A-pillar geometry, aerodynamically optimised exterior mirror housings and rear shape, optimised diffuser, optimised underbody and rear axle panelling, radiator shutter, aero wheel trims and serrated wheel spoilers on the front and rear wheel arches. The vehicle was set to go on sale in September 2013.

==== Mercedes-Benz Sport Equipment CLA 200 concept (2013) ====
It is a version of Mercedes-Benz CLA 200 demonstrating Mercedes-Benz Accessories GmbH equipment for the CLA. It included "Road & Track" decal kit (number '1' decal at front door and hood, decorative stripe in red/grey runs along the centre of the car), carbon fibre-style exterior mirror housings, front apron spoiler lip and rear spoiler; red-painted brake callipers, Styling Package Night (black window surrounds, black shoulderline trip strips), 18-inch two-tone 5-twin-spoke light-alloy wheels in matt black with red rim flange, Sport badge at front wings, illuminated door sill panels with Sport lettering, a leather sports steering wheel, sports pedals in brushed stainless steel, Sport floor mats Drive Kit Plus. The vehicles were unveiled in 2013 Frankfurt International Motor Show.

==== Shooting Brake (2015–2019) ====
Mercedes-Benz announced the X117 CLA Shooting Brake at the 2014 LA Auto Show, which is a five-door station wagon version of the CLA sedan. It measures in at the same length as the CLA sedan and also shares the same wheelbase. It was not sold in the United States.

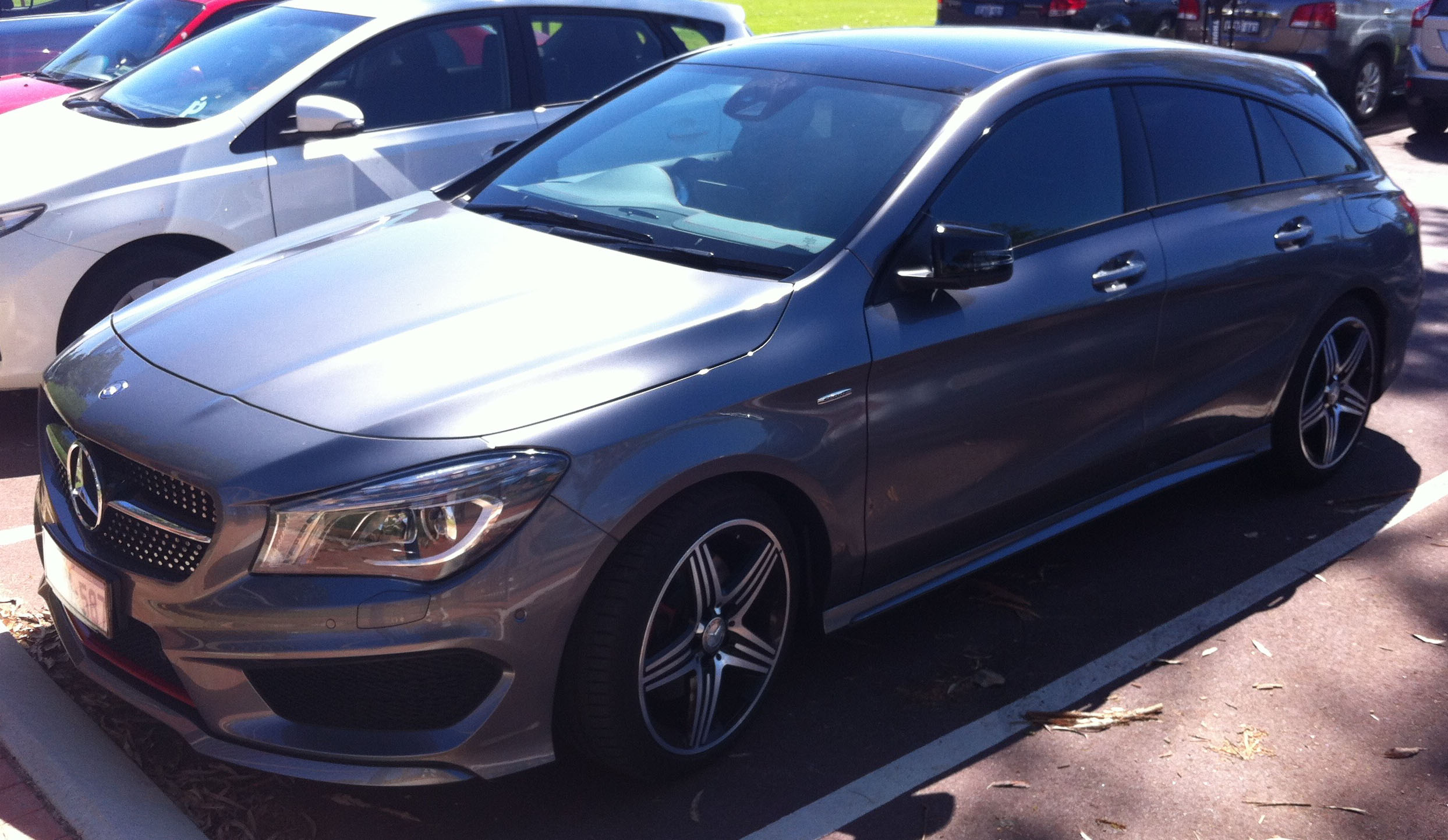
Mercedes-Benz CLA 250 Shooting Brake (pre-facelift)

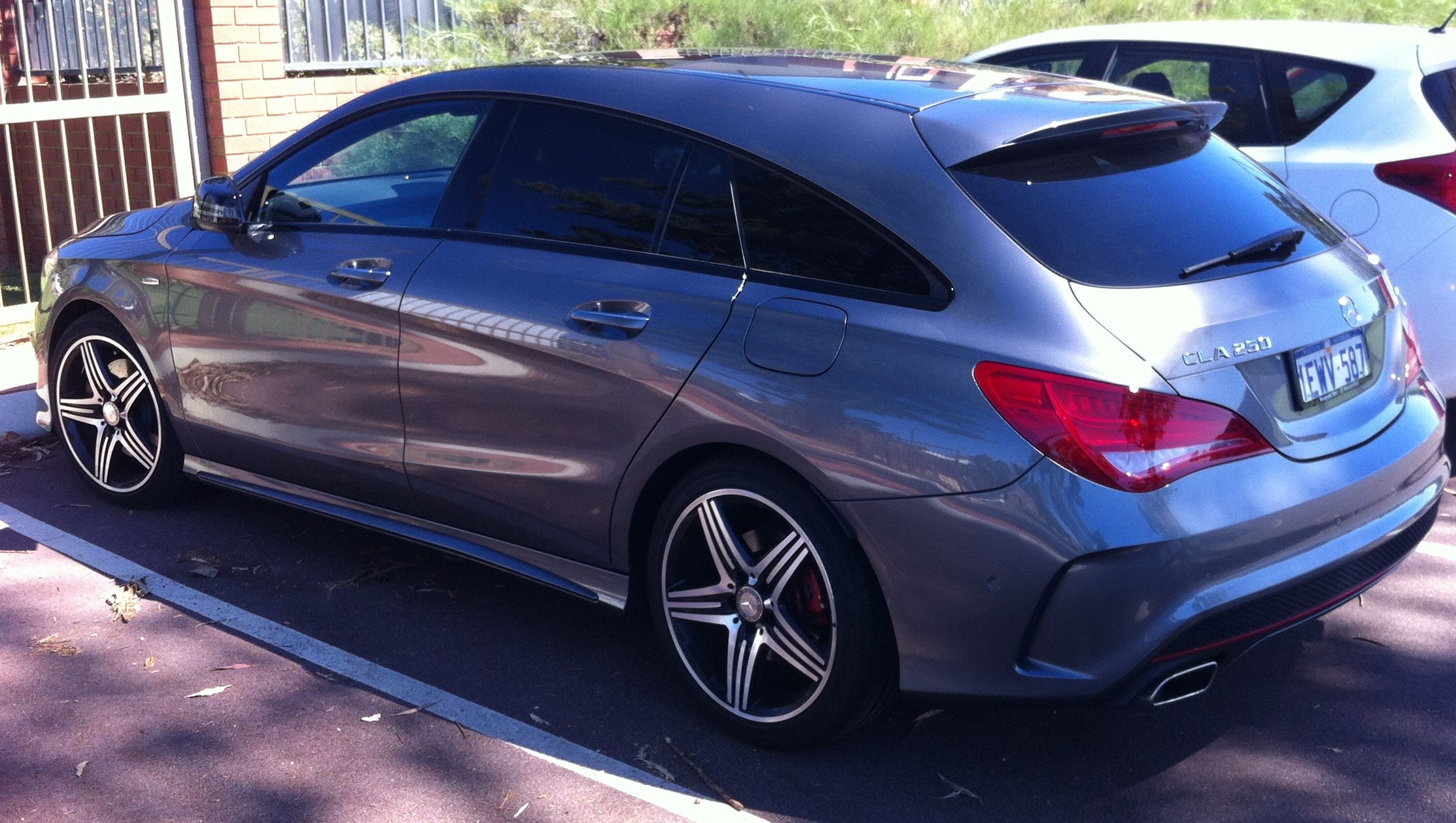
Mercedes-Benz CLA 250 Shooting Brake (pre-facelift)

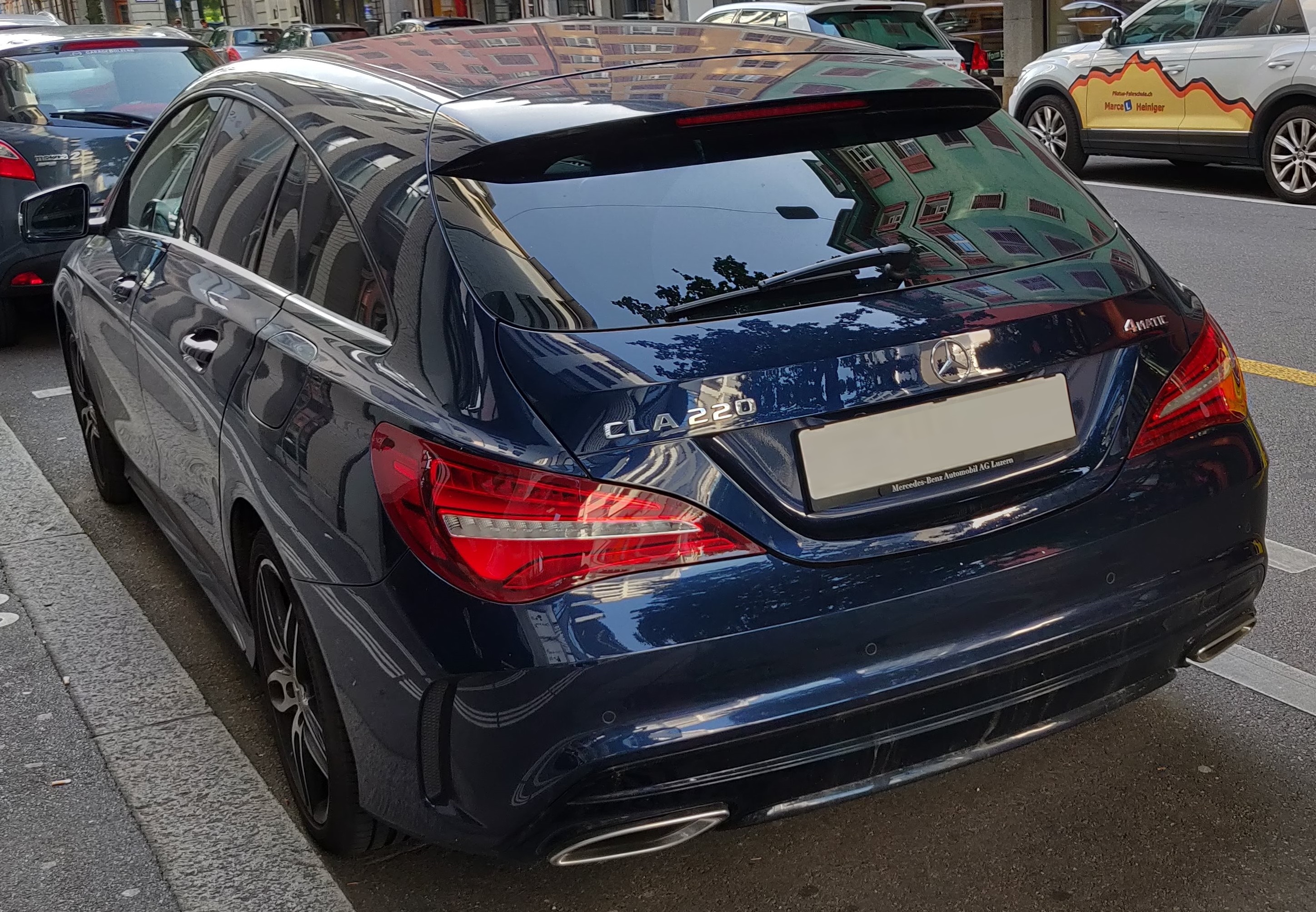
Mercedes-Benz CLA 220 Shooting Brake (facelift)

The only visual changes start from the B-pillar, which provides more headroom in the backseat area. It also provides more boot space than the sedan, 470 litres to 495 litres, while folding the rear seats flat frees a usable 1354 litres. The Shooting Brake has worse fuel economy than the sedan due to the slight kerb weight increase and the drag coefficient increasing from Cd=0.23 to Cd=0.26.

=== Technical details ===
==== Engines ====
All CLA models are powered by four-cylinder engines, including a choice of 1.6 L and 2.0 L petrol, and three diesels, a 1.5L, a 1.8 L and a 2.2 L. Most of the engines come in a range of different states of tuning, and all include a stop-start feature.

Model	Years	Configuration	Displacement	Power	Torque	0–100 km/h (0–62 mph)	Top speed	Fuel consumption/efficiency (EU-Norm combined)
Petrol engines
CLA 180 BlueEFFICIENCY Edition (Coupé only)	01/2013–05/2018	I4 turbo (M 270 DE 16 AL red.)	1,595 cc	90 kW (122 PS; 121 hp) at 5,000 rpm	200 N⋅m (148 lbf⋅ft) at 1,250–4,000 rpm	9.9 seconds	190 km/h (118 mph)	5.0 L/100 km (47 mpg_{‑US})
CLA 180	01/2013–12/2018	I4 turbo (M 270 DE 16 AL)	1,595 cc	122 PS (90 kW; 120 hp) at 5,000 rpm	200 N⋅m (148 lbf⋅ft) at 1,250–4,000 rpm	9.3 seconds (Coupé); 9.4 seconds (Shooting Brake)	210 km/h (130 mph)	7.3–7.5 L/100 km (32–31 mpg_{‑US}) (Coupé); 7.3–7.5 L/100 km (32–31 mpg_{‑US}) (Shooting Brake)
CLA 200	01/2013–12/2018	I4 turbo (M 270 DE 16 AL)	1,595 cc	115 kW (156 PS; 154 hp) at 5,000 rpm	250 N⋅m (184 lbf⋅ft) at 1,250–4,000 rpm	8.6 seconds (Coupé); 8.8 seconds (Shooting Brake)	230 km/h (143 mph) (Coupé); 225 km/h (140 mph) (Shooting Brake)	5.5–5.7 L/100 km (43–41 mpg_{‑US}) (Coupé); 5.6–6.0 L/100 km (42–39 mpg_{‑US}) (Shooting Brake)
CLA 220 4MATIC	07/2016-12/2018	I4 turbo (M 270 DE 20 AL)	1,991 cc	135 kW (184 PS; 181 hp) at 5,000 rpm	300 N⋅m (221 lbf⋅ft) at 1,250–4,000 rpm	7.1 seconds (Coupé); 7.2 seconds (Shooting Brake)	240 km/h (149 mph) (Coupé); 235 km/h (146 mph) (Shooting Brake)	6.5–6.7 L/100 km (36–35 mpg_{‑US}) (Coupé); 7.3–7.5 L/100 km (32–31 mpg_{‑US}) (Shooting Brake)
CLA 250	01/2013–12/2018	I4 turbo (M 270 DE 20 AL)	1,991 cc	155 kW (211 PS; 208 hp) at 5,500 rpm	350 N⋅m (258 lbf⋅ft) at 1,200–4,000 rpm	6.6 seconds (Coupé); 6.8 seconds (Shooting Brake)	240 km/h (149 mph) (Coupé); 240 km/h (149 mph) (Shooting Brake)	5.4–5.5 L/100 km (44–43 mpg_{‑US}) (Coupé); 5.5–5.7 L/100 km (43–41 mpg_{‑US}) (Shooting Brake)
CLA 250 Sport (Coupé only)	02/2014–05/2018	I4 turbo (M 270 DE 20 AL)	1,991 cc	160 kW (218 PS; 215 hp) at 5,500 rpm	350 N⋅m (258 lbf⋅ft) at 1,200–4,000 rpm	6.5 seconds	250 km/h (155 mph)	5.8 L/100 km (41 mpg_{‑US})
CLA 250 4MATIC	06/2013–12/2018	I4 turbo (M 270 DE 20 AL)	1,991 cc	155 kW (211 PS; 208 hp) at 5,500 rpm	350 N⋅m (258 lbf⋅ft) at 1,200–4,000 rpm	6.5 seconds (Coupé); 6.6 seconds (Shooting Brake)	240 km/h (149 mph)	6.4–6.6 L/100 km (37–36 mpg_{‑US}) (Coupé); 6.6–6.8 L/100 km (36–35 mpg_{‑US}) (Shooting Brake)
CLA 250 Sport 4MATIC	02/2014-05/2018	I4 turbo (M 270 DE 20 AL)	1,991 cc	165 kW (224 PS; 221 hp) at 5,500 rpm	350 N⋅m (258 lbf⋅ft) at 1,200–4,000 rpm	6.4 seconds (Coupé); 6.7 seconds (Shooting Brake)	250 km/h (155 mph) (Coupé); 240 km/h (149 mph) (Shooting Brake)	6.6 L/100 km (36 mpg_{‑US}) (Coupé); 6.8 L/100 km (35 mpg_{‑US}) (Shooting Brake)
CLA 250 AMG Performance Package Plus**	02/2014–08/2014	I4 turbo (M 270 DE 20 AL)	1,991 cc	208 kW (283 PS; 279 hp) at 5,800 rpm	420 N⋅m (310 lbf⋅ft) at 1,200–4,000 rpm	5.6 seconds	250 km/h (155 mph)	6.1 L/100 km (39 mpg_{‑US})
CLA 45 AMG 4MATIC*	01/2013–08/2015	I4 twin-scroll turbo (M 133 DE 20 AL)	1,991 cc	265 kW (360 PS; 355 hp) at 6,000 rpm	450 N⋅m (332 lbf⋅ft) at 2,250–5,000 rpm	4.5 seconds (Coupé); 4.8 seconds (Shooting Brake)	250 km/h (155 mph) / 270 km/h (168 mph)*	6.9 L/100 km (34 mpg_{‑US}) (Coupé); 6.9–7.1 L/100 km (34–33 mpg_{‑US}) (Shooting Brake)
CLA 45 AMG 4MATIC*	09/2015–12/2018	I4 twin-scroll turbo (M 133 DE 20 AL)	1,991 cc	280 kW (381 PS; 375 hp) at 6,000 rpm	475 N⋅m (350 lbf⋅ft) at 2,250–5,000 rpm	4.2 seconds (Coupé); 4.3 seconds (Shooting Brake)	250 km/h (155 mph) / 270 km/h (168 mph)*	6.9 L/100 km (34 mpg_{‑US}) (Coupé); 6.9–7.1 L/100 km (34–33 mpg_{‑US}) (Shooting Brake)
Diesel engines
CLA 180 CDI***	11/2013-05/2018	I4 turbo (OM 607 DE 15 LA)	1,461 cc	80 kW (109 PS; 107 hp) at 4,000 rpm	260 N⋅m (192 lbf⋅ft) at 1,750–2,500 rpm	11.6 seconds	205 km/h (127 mph)	3.9–4.2 L/100 km (60–56 mpg_{‑US})
CLA 200 CDI (Coupé only)	01/2013-08/2014	I4 turbo (OM 651 DE 18 LA)	1,796 cc	100 kW (136 PS; 134 hp) at 4,000 rpm	300 N⋅m (221 lbf⋅ft) at 1,750–2,500 rpm	9.4 seconds	220 km/h (137 mph)	4.1–4.4 L/100 km (57–53 mpg_{‑US})
CLA 200 CDI***	09/2014–12/2018	I4 turbo (OM 651 DE 22 LA)	2,143 cc	100 kW (136 PS; 134 hp) at 3,600–4,000 rpm	300 N⋅m (221 lbf⋅ft) at 1,600–3,000 rpm	9.9 seconds (Coupé); 9.5 seconds (Shooting Brake)	220 km/h (137 mph) (Coupé); 215 km/h (134 mph) (Shooting Brake)	4.1 L/100 km (57 mpg_{‑US}) (Coupé); 4.1–4.4 L/100 km (57–53 mpg_{‑US}) (Shooting Brake)
CLA 200 CDI 4MATIC***	09/2014–12/2018	I4 turbo (OM 651 DE 22 LA)	2,143 cc	115 kW (156 PS; 154 hp) at 3,200–4,000 rpm	300 N⋅m (221 lbf⋅ft) at 1,400–3,000 rpm	9.8 seconds	216 km/h (134 mph)(Coupé); 212 km/h (132 mph) (Shooting Brake)	4.1 L/100 km (57 mpg_{‑US}) (Coupé); 4.1–4.4 L/100 km (57–53 mpg_{‑US}) (Shooting Brake)
CLA 220 CDI***	01/2013–12/2018	I4 turbo (OM 651 DE 22 LA)	2,143 cc	125 kW (170 PS; 168 hp) at 3,400–4,000 rpm	350 N⋅m (258 lbf⋅ft) at 1,400–3,400 rpm	7.7 seconds (Coupé); 7.8 seconds (Shooting Brake)	220 km/h (137 mph) (Coupé); 215 km/h (134 mph) (Shooting Brake)	4.0–4.2 L/100 km (59–56 mpg_{‑US}) (Coupé); 4.0–4.3 L/100 km (59–55 mpg_{‑US}) (Shooting Brake)
CLA 220 CDI 4MATIC***	09/2014–12/2018	I4 turbo (OM 651 DE 22 LA)	2,143 cc	125 kW (170 PS; 168 hp) at 3,400–4,000 rpm	350 N⋅m (258 lbf⋅ft) at 1,400–3,400 rpm	7.7 seconds (Coupé); 7.8 seconds (Shooting Brake)	220 km/h (137 mph) (Coupé); 215 km/h (134 mph) (Shooting Brake)	4.0–4.2 L/100 km (59–56 mpg_{‑US}) (Coupé); 4.0–4.3 L/100 km (59–55 mpg_{‑US}) (Shooting Brake)

*With optional extra-cost AMG Driver's Package.

**(sold only in states LA, TX) Optional package, not base model.

***The designation "d" replaces "CDI" on all diesel models from 2015 onwards.

==== Transmissions ====
Model	Years	Types
Petrol engines
CLA 180 BlueEFFICIENCY Edition	01/2013–05/2018	6-speed manual
CLA 180	01/2013–12/2018	6-speed manual, 7-speed automatic 7G-DCT
CLA 200	01/2013–12/2018	6-speed manual, 7-speed automatic 7G-DCT
CLA 220 4MATIC	07/2016–12/2018	7-speed automatic 7G-DCT
CLA 250	01/2013–12/2018	7-speed automatic 7G-DCT
CLA 250 Sport	02/2014–05/2018	7-speed automatic 7G-DCT
CLA 250 4MATIC	06/2013–12/2018	7-speed automatic 7G-DCT
CLA 250 4MATIC Sport	02/2014–05/2018	7-speed automatic 7G-DCT
CLA 45 AMG	01/2013–12/2018	7-speed automatic AMG SPEEDSHIFT DCT
Diesel engines
CLA 180 CDI/CLA 180 d	11/2013–12/2018	6-speed manual, 7-speed automatic 7G-DCT
CLA 200 CDI/CLA 200 d	01/2013–12/2018	6-speed manual, 7-speed automatic 7G-DCT
CLA 200 CDI 4MATIC/CLA 200 d 4MATIC	09/2014–12/2018	7-speed automatic 7G-DCT
CLA 220 CDI/CLA 220 d	01/2013–12/2018	7-speed automatic 7G-DCT
CLA 220 CDI 4MATIC/CLA 220 d 4MATIC	09/2014–12/2018	7-speed automatic 7G-DCT

The 7G-DCT transmission includes electric activation of the hydraulics for the parking lock, which is locked by mechanical means; three gearshift programs (ECONOMY, SPORT, MANUAL). 7G-DCT transmission option became available for CLA 180 in June 2013, followed by CLA 200 CDI in September 2013.

=== AMG models ===
==== Mercedes-AMG CLA 45 (2013–2019) ====
The Mercedes-AMG CLA 45 (previously Mercedes-Benz CLA 45 AMG) is a high-performance model of the CLA from Mercedes-AMG. The car shares its drivetrain with the A45 AMG, and it features an AMG M133 2.0-litre four-cylinder twin-scroll turbocharged petrol engine, 4MATIC all wheel drive, SPEEDSHIFT DCT 7-speed transmission with paddle shifters, AMG sports suspension with independently developed front and rear axles, electromechanical AMG speed-sensitive sports steering, AMG high-performance braking system, three-stage ESP with "SPORT Handling" mode. Other features include AMG "twin-blade" radiator grille in matt titanium grey, AMG front fascia with front splitter in matt titanium grey, Large side cooling air intakes with black flics, Side sill panels with inserts in matt titanium grey, "TURBO AMG" lettering on front wing, AMG rear fascia with stylised side air outlet openings, Rear diffuser insert with trim in matt titanium grey, AMG sports exhaust system with two rectangular chrome-plated tailpipe trims featuring twin-tailpipe design, Bi-xenon headlamps, Tail lights with LED technology, Red seat belts, sports seats in ARTICO man-made leather/DINAMICA microfibre with red contrasting topstitching and red seat belts, the multifunction sports steering wheel with shift paddles, and the AMG DRIVE UNIT with E-SELECT lever, instrument panel trim in brushed aluminium and five galvanised ventilation outlets, central colour display incorporates the AMG main menu including RACETIMER.

The AMG M133 2.0 twin-scroll turbocharged 4-cylinder engine was the world’s most powerful production 4-cylinder engine when the CLA 45 AMG was introduced. The engine produces 355 hp (265 kW) and 450 N⋅m (332 lbf⋅ft) from a 2.0-litre engine, with a claimed 0–100 km/h (62 mph) acceleration time of 4.3 seconds.

The vehicle was unveiled in the 2013 Geneva Motor Show, followed by the 2013 New York International Auto Show. It went on sale in late September 2013.

For the 2016 model year, Mercedes-AMG increased the horsepower of the CLA 45. It was uprated to produce 375 hp (280 kW) and 475 N⋅m (350 lbf⋅ft) which allows the car to accelerate from 0–60 mph (97 km/h) in 4.1 seconds compared to the previous 4.4 seconds with 355 hp (265 kW). New features that were added include AMG DYNAMIC SELECT and an introduction to AMG DYNAMIC PLUS package which brings enhanced acceleration, suspension, and transmission.

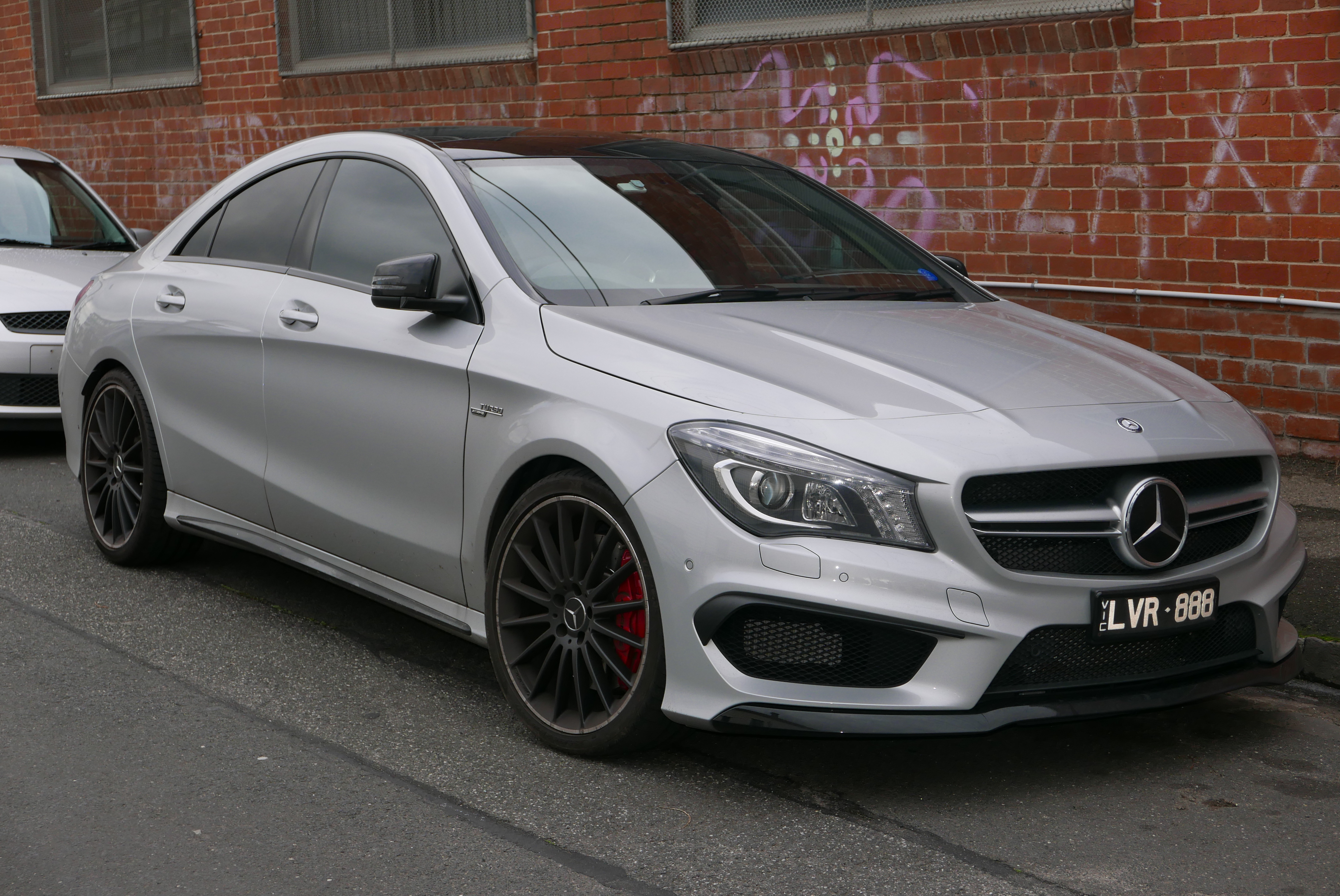
Mercedes-AMG CLA 45 (pre-facelift)

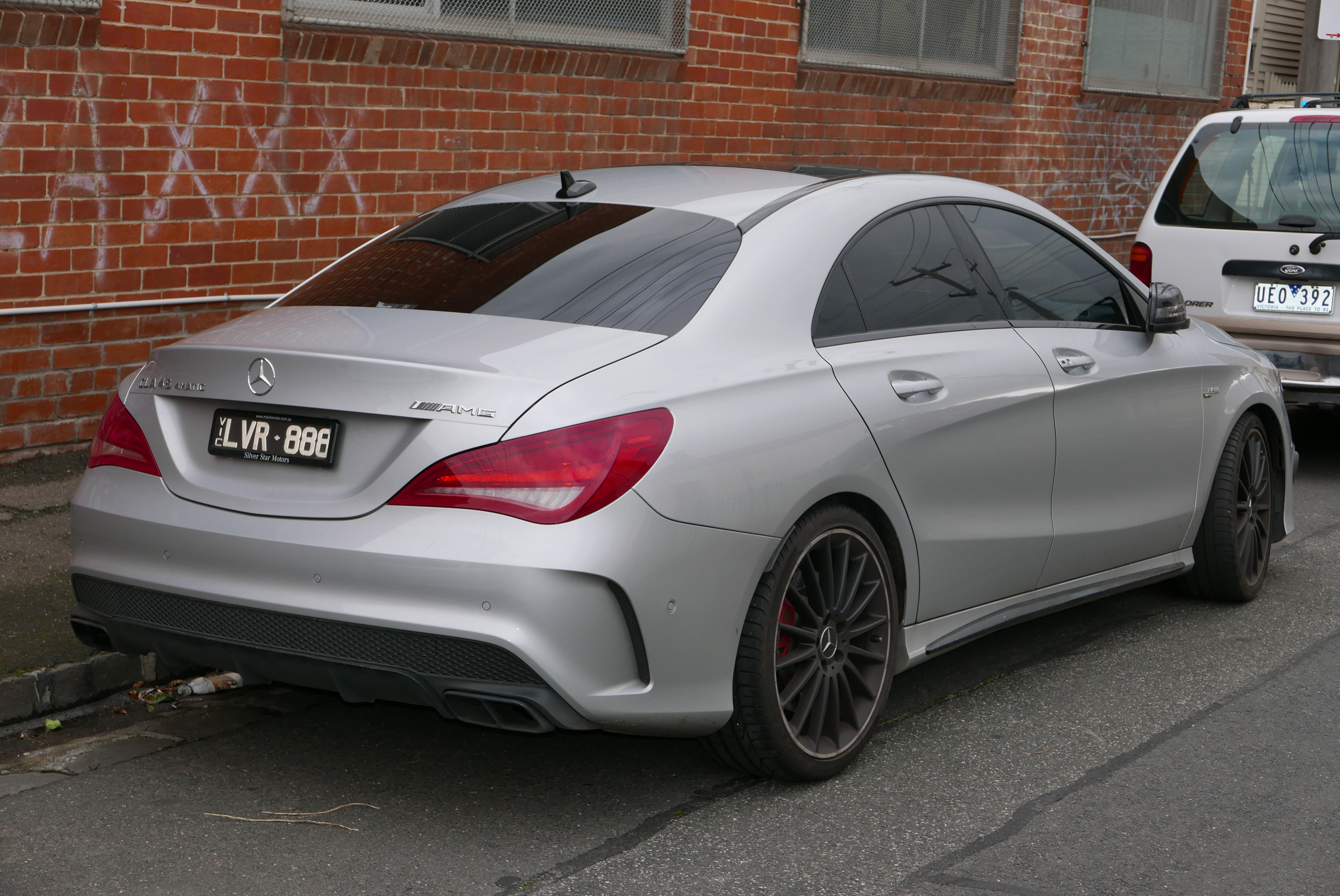
Mercedes-AMG CLA 45 (pre-facelift)

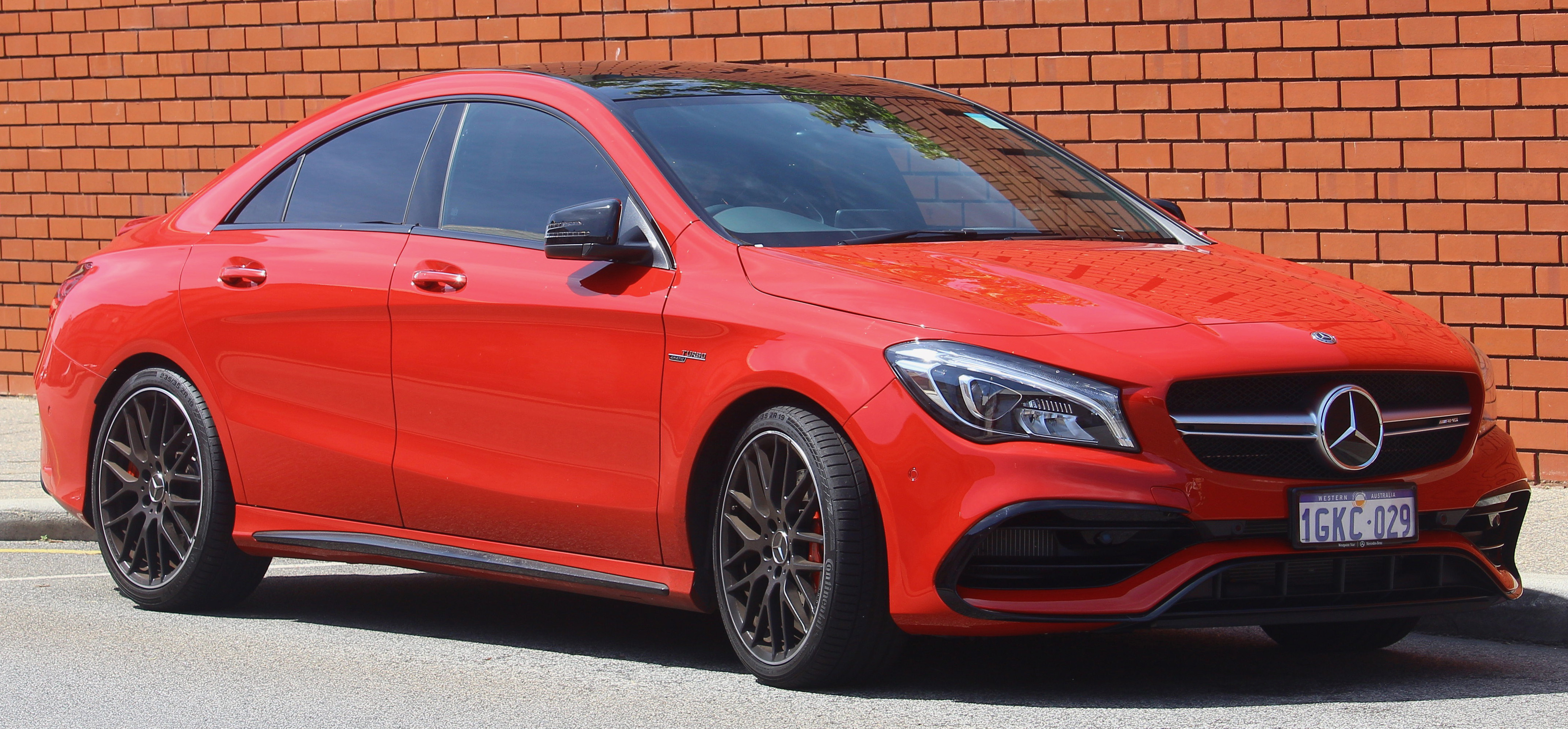
Mercedes-AMG CLA 45 (facelift)

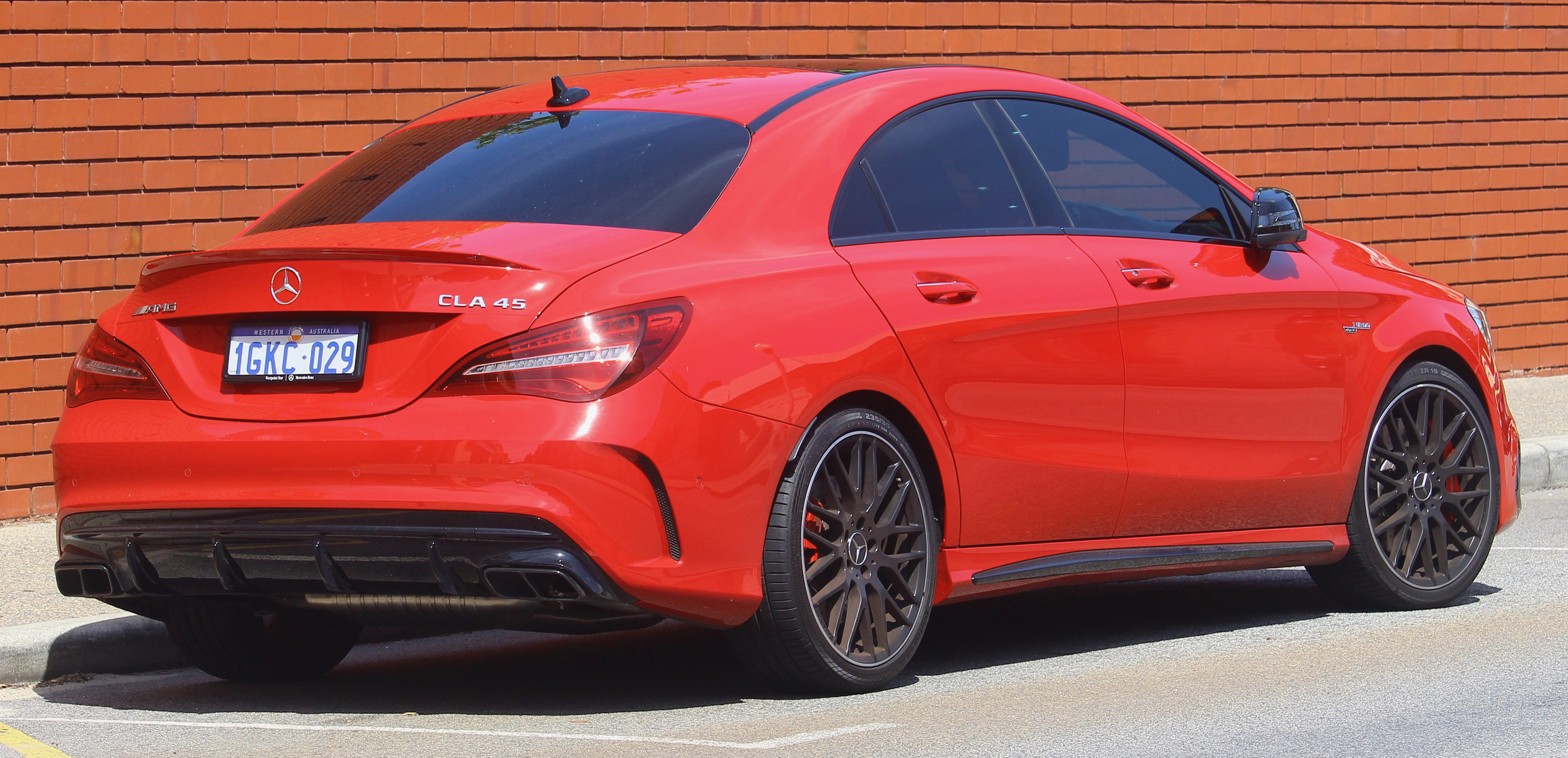
Mercedes-AMG CLA 45 (facelift)

==== CLA 45 AMG Edition 1 (2014) ====
The Edition 1 model includes Night package, red accents on the radiator grille and exterior mirrors, and AMG sports stripes in matt graphite grey above the side sill panels; optional Intelligent Light System includes red accents on the headlamps, AMG multi-spoke alloy wheels in matt black with special AMG hub caps featuring a centre-locking look, red brake callipers, 8 x 19 alloy wheels with 235/35 R 19 tyres, spoiler lip in high-gloss black on the boot lid, choice of 2 standard (cirrus white, night black) and 4 optional (cosmos black metallic, mountain grey metallic, polar silver metallic, designo polar silver magno) body colours.

==== CLA 45 AMG Racing Series (2013) ====
This is a race car version of the CLA 45 AMG for the CLA 45 AMG Racing Series, with carbon-fibre reinforced plastics doors. The vehicle was unveiled in the 2013 Frankfurt International Motor Show.

==== CLA 45 AMG 4MATIC AMG 50th Anniversary Edition (2017) ====
To celebrate the 50th anniversary of AMG, Mercedes-Benz Korea launched a 50-unit limited edition of the CLA 45 AMG. It was fitted with 'AMG Aerodynamic package' in stock condition. Externally, it had a Cosmos Black interior colour with matte grey AMG stripes across the hood and the doors. They also gave yellow highlights, such as the side mirrors, wheels, and the bottom part of the front, rear, and back side of the car. In the interior, it was finished with black coloured alcantara and leather, and gave yellow highlights like the exterior, such as the air vents, dashboard, and floor mats. It also had AMG performance seats and Harman/Kardon Logic7 stereo system as stock.

=== Safety ===
==== ANCAP ====
ANCAP test results* Mercedes-Benz CLA-Class all coupe/sedan variants (2013)
Test	Score
Overall	5 /5 stars
Frontal offset	15.16/16
Side impact	16/16
Pole	2/2
Seat belt reminders	3/3
Whiplash protection	Good
Pedestrian protection	Adequate
Electronic stability control	Standard

==== Euro NCAP ====
The CLA achieved the best possible rating of five stars for occupant safety, pedestrian protection and assistance systems in the demanding Euro NCAP assessment scheme. The CLA comes standard with a number of safety systems like Collision Prevention Assist, Attention Assist, Adaptive braking technology, Daytime Running Lamps and Rain-sensing windshield wipers. The CLA also received three "Euro NCAP Advanced" rewards for these safety innovations, including the radar-assisted second-generation Collision Prevention Assist, the Attention Assist drowsiness detection system and the anticipatory occupant protection system Pre-Safe (optional equipment). Mercedes-Benz upgraded the safety systems for the 2015 CLA with even more of the latest technology, this includes the Collision Prevention Assist Plus, which helps to reduce the risk of rear-end collisions, and also upgraded the Attention Assist and Traffic Sign Assist (with Speed Limit Assist) systems.

Euro NCAP test results* Mercedes-Benz CLA 200 “Urban” (2013)
Test	Points	%
Overall:	5 /5 stars	
Adult occupant:	33	91%
Child occupant:	37	75%
Pedestrian:	27	74%
Safety assist:	7	81%

== Second generation (C118; 2019) ==
Second generation
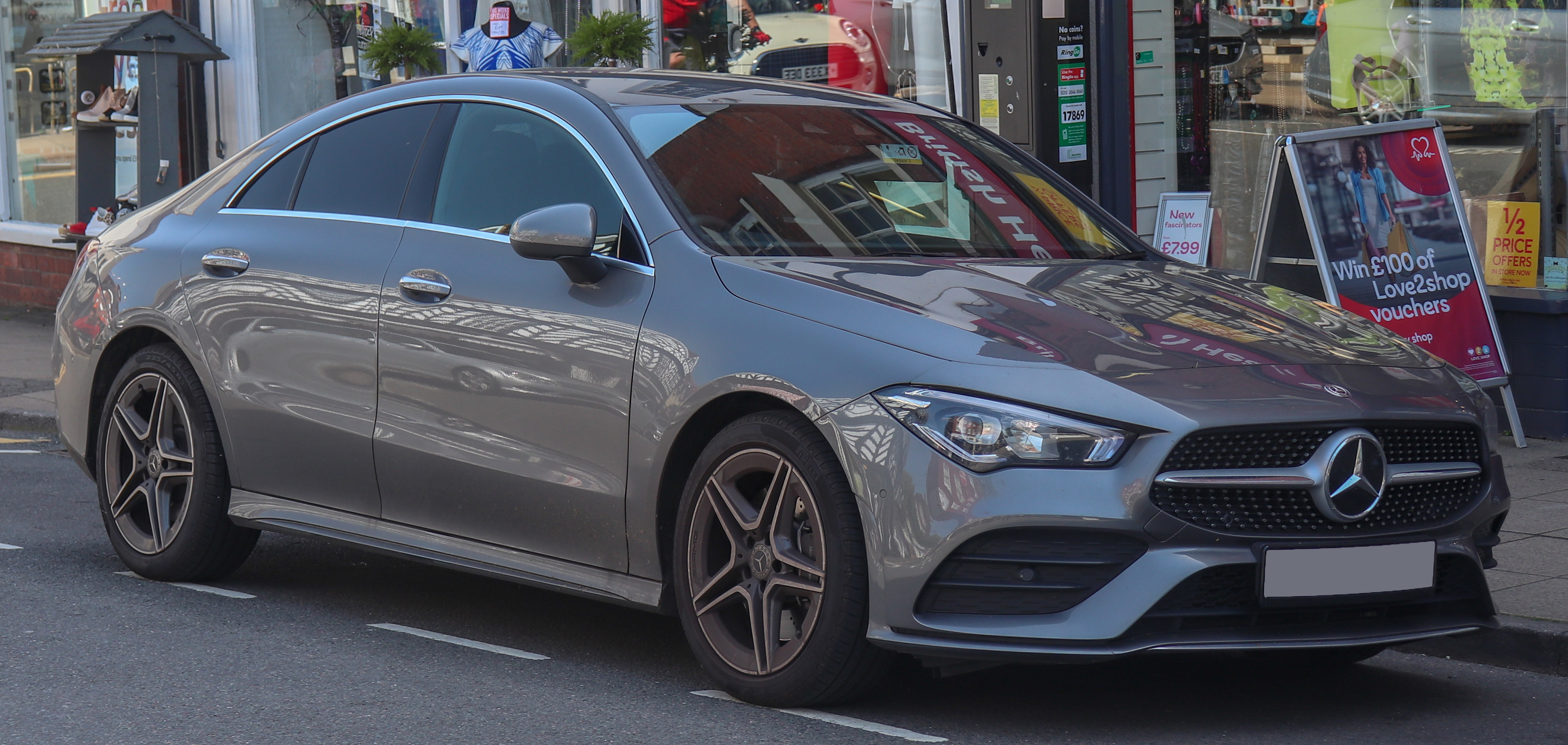
- Mercedes-Benz CLA 220

Overview
- Model code: C118; X118 (shooting brake)
- Production: February 2019 –2025
- Assembly: Hungary: Kecskemét (Mercedes-Benz Manufacturing Hungary)
- Designer: Balázs Filczer

Body and chassis
- Platform: MFA2
- Related: Mercedes-Benz A-Class (W/V/Z177); Mercedes-Benz GLA (H247); Mercedes-Benz B-Class (W247); Mercedes-Benz GLB (X247)

Powertrain
- Engine: Petrol: 1.3 L M282 turbo I4; 2.0 L M260 turbo I4; 2.0 L M139 turbo I4; Petrol plug-in hybrid: 1.3 L M282 turbo I4; Diesel: 1.5 L OM608 turbo I4; 2.0 L OM654 turbo I4
- Transmission: 6-speed manual (2019–2023); 7-speed DCT; 8-speed DCT (AMG CLA 45, 45 S, 200d & 220d)

Dimensions
- Wheelbase: 2,729 mm (107.4 in)
- Length: 4,688 mm (184.6 in)
- Width: 1,830 mm (72.0 in)
- Height: 1,439 mm (56.7 in)

The second generation CLA was unveiled at the 2019 Consumer Electronics Show in January 2019. Based on the same Modular Front Architecture (MFA2) platform as the W177 A-Class, W247 B-Class, X247 GLB and H247 GLA the C118 CLA retains the fastback styling to set it apart from the V177 A-Class Sedan and shares its powertrains with the A-Class. Stylistically, the design is inspired by the new design language Mercedes-Benz adopted for the C257 CLS.

The C118 has an almost completely flat underbody, resulting in a drag coefficient of 0.23. It uses MacPherson front struts combined with either a twist beam or multi-link at the rear, and the option of adaptive dampers. Compared to its predecessor, the C118 is 48 mm (1.9 in) longer, 53 mm (2.1 in) wider and loses 2 mm (0.079 in) in height, while its wheelbase has been extended by 30 mm (1.2 in).

All models feature the Mercedes-Benz User Experience (MBUX) infotainment system, including the "Hey Mercedes" voice-controlled assistant and a new Interior Assist gesture control system. Standard models feature two 7-inch displays for the instrument cluster and MBUX screen, and can be upgraded to 10.25-inch screens, a full-colour head-up display, adaptive cruise control, active steering assist, and active brake assist.

The X118 CLA Shooting Brake was unveiled at the 2019 Geneva Auto Show, and entered production in June 2019. It has 505 litres of boot space, 10 L more than the outgoing model and 45 L more than the standard CLA. Like its predecessor, the CLA Shooting Brake has a drag coefficient of 0.26. However, the CLA Shooting Brake will not be sold in the United States and Australia.

The AMG CLA35 model was unveiled at the 2019 New York International Auto Show. It uses an all-wheel drive layout and has a 7-speed dual clutch AMG SpeedShift DCT transmission. The range-performing variants AMG CLA45 and CLA45 S were unveiled at the 2019 Goodwood Festival of Speed. They both uses an all-wheel drive system that can also split torque between the rear wheels via separate clutches and has a 8-speed dual clutch AMG SpeedShift DCT transmission. The AMG variants are also available in the Shooting Brake configuration. The range-performing variants AMG CLA35 4MATIC and CLA45 S 4MATIC+ were unveiled at the 2020 in Thailand. They are imported from Hungary and the AMG variants are also available in the coupe configuration.

The CLA 250 e plug-in hybrid variant was revealed in March 2020; it is available as a coupé or estate.

It received a facelift in January 2023, which involved the discontinuation of the manual transmission, alongside the A-Class and B-Class, resulted in Mercedes-Benz fully retiring manual transmissions.

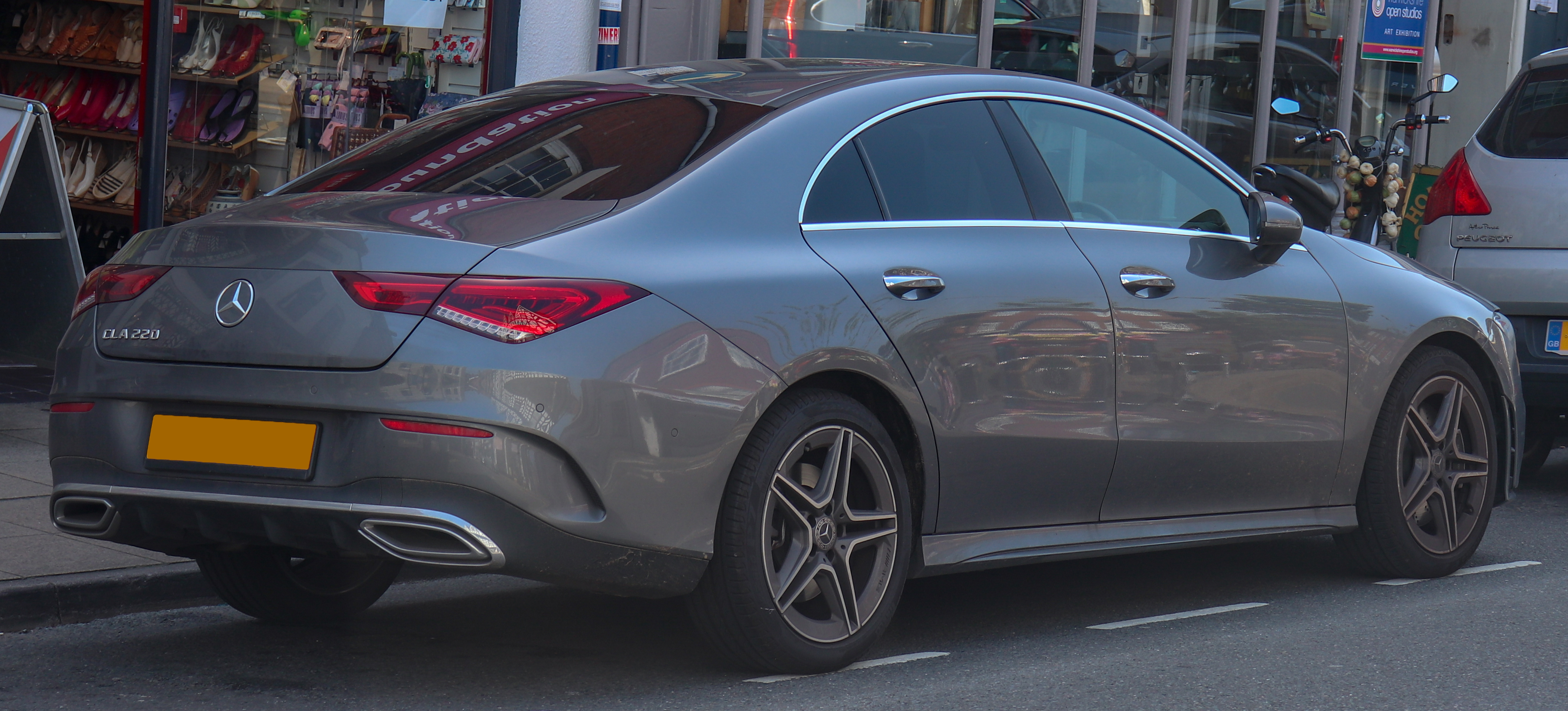
2019 Mercedes-Benz CLA 220 AMG Line

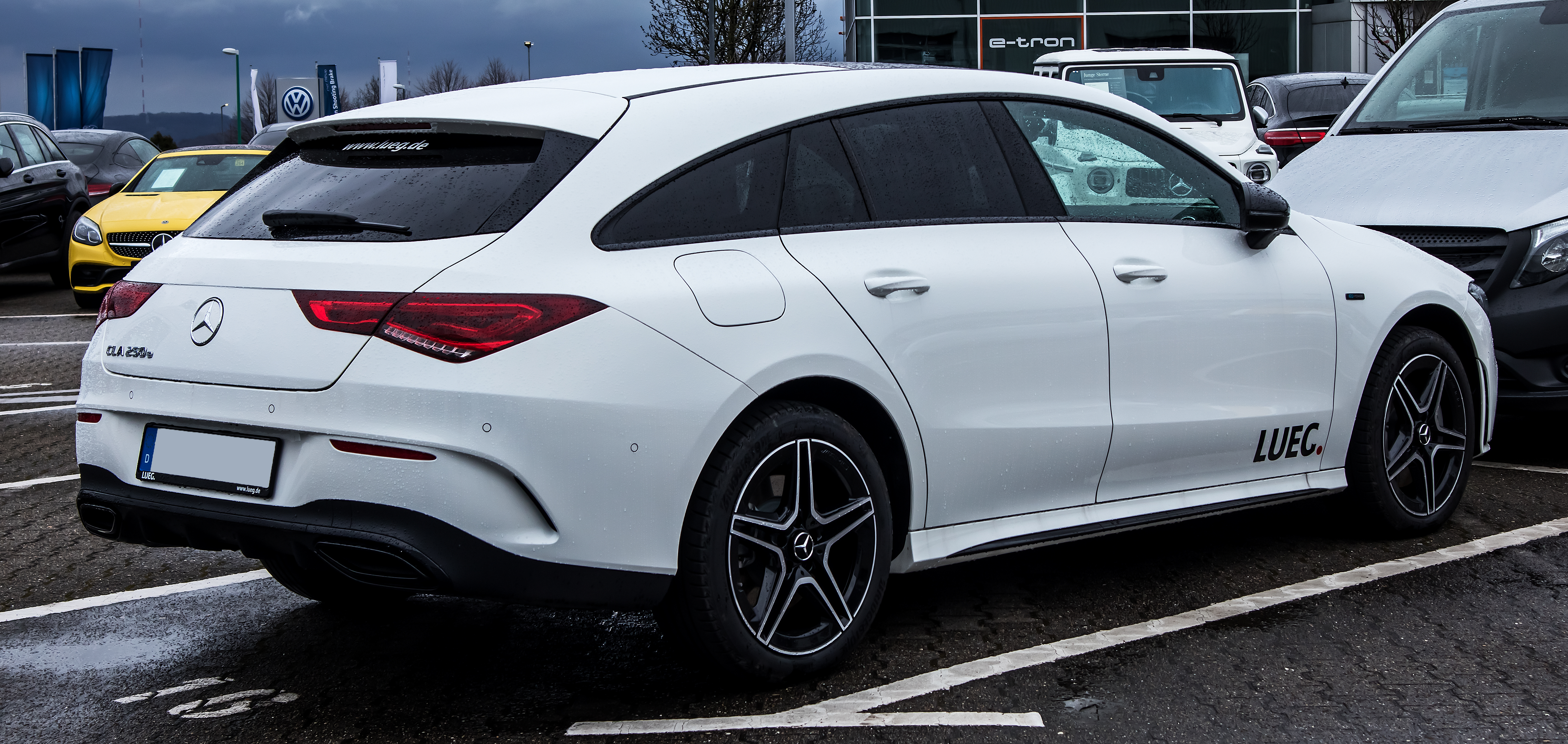
Mercedes-Benz CLA 250 e Shooting Brake

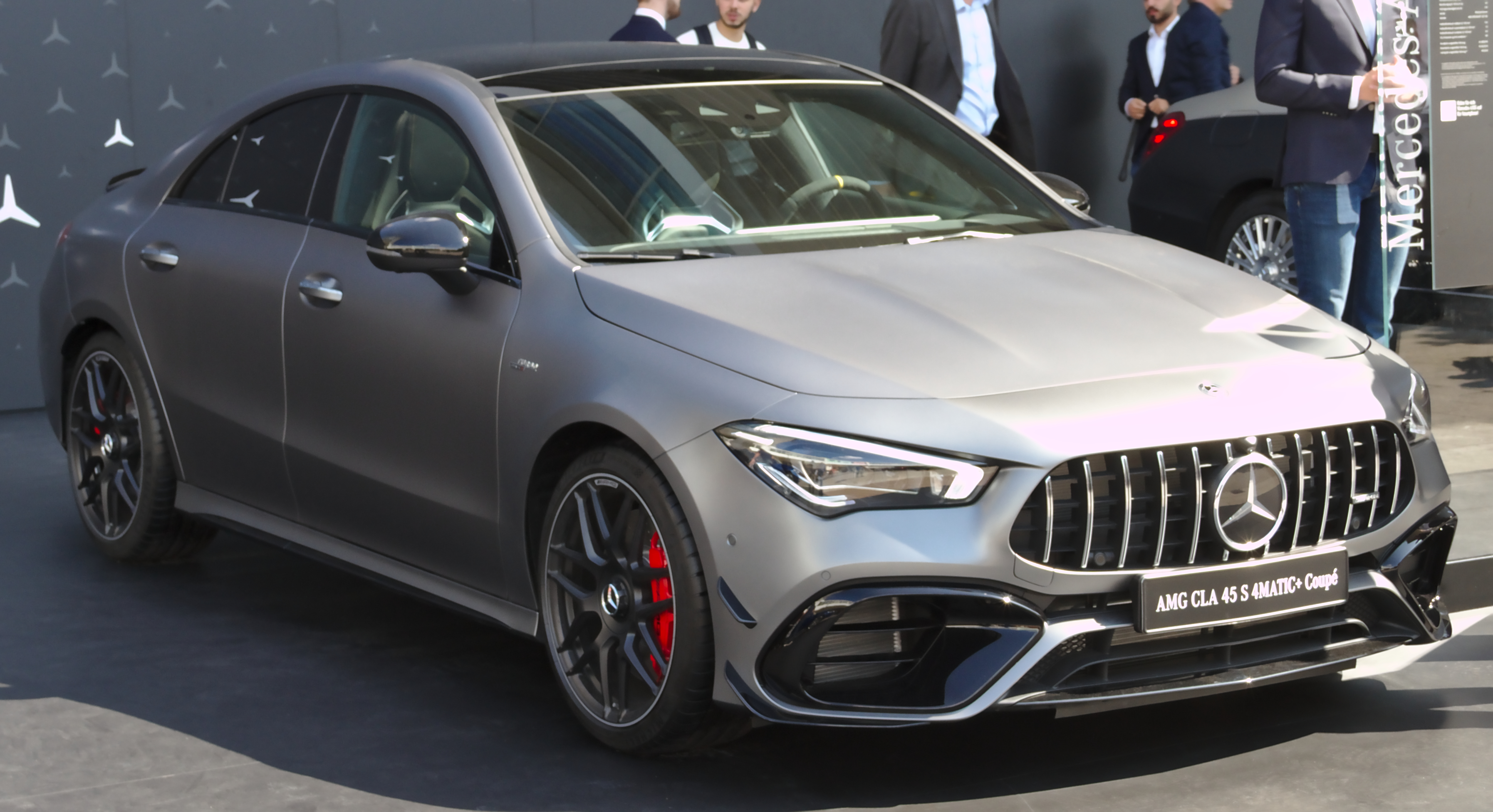
Mercedes-AMG CLA 45 S 4MATIC+

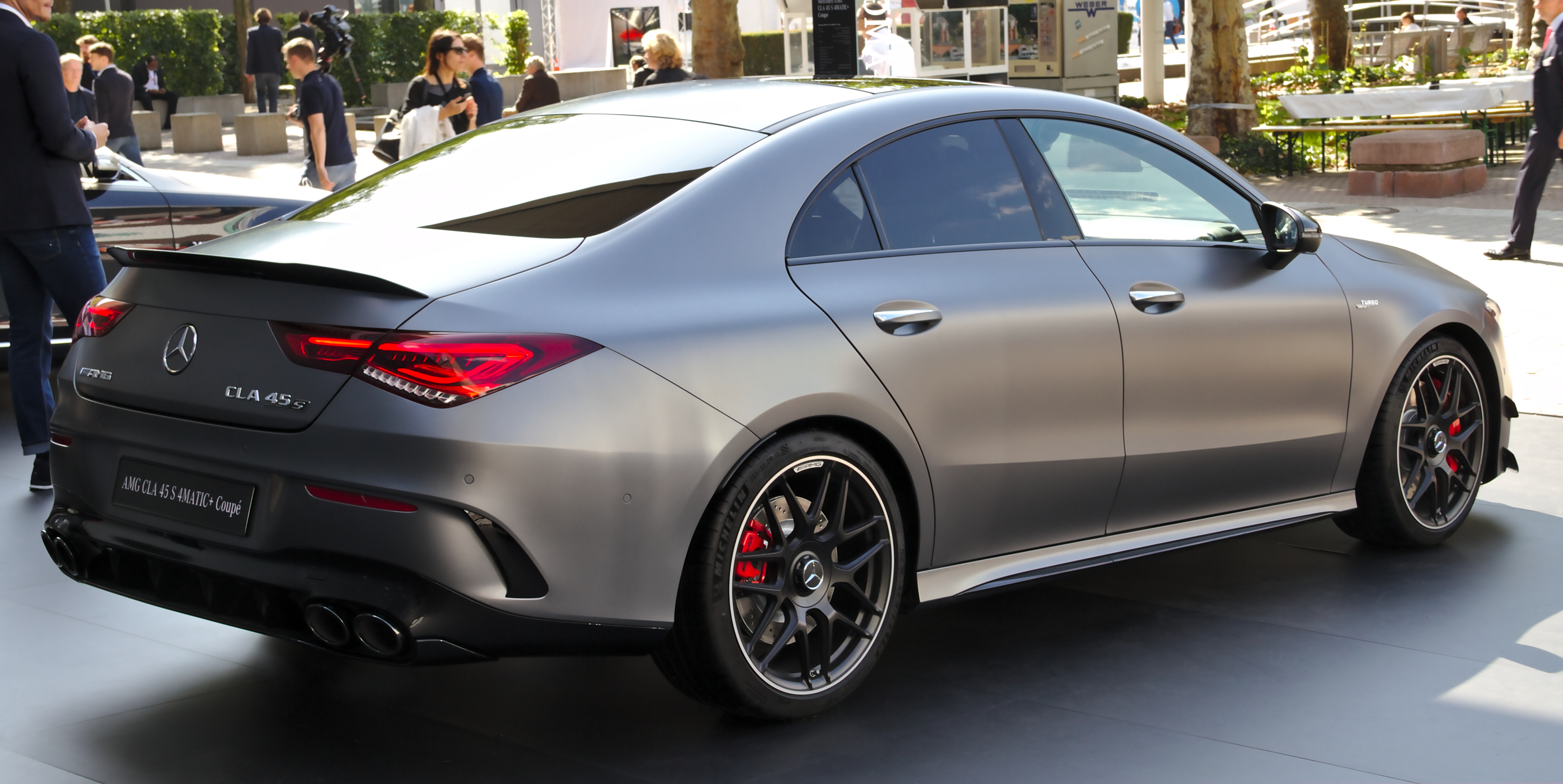
Mercedes-AMG CLA 45 S 4MATIC+

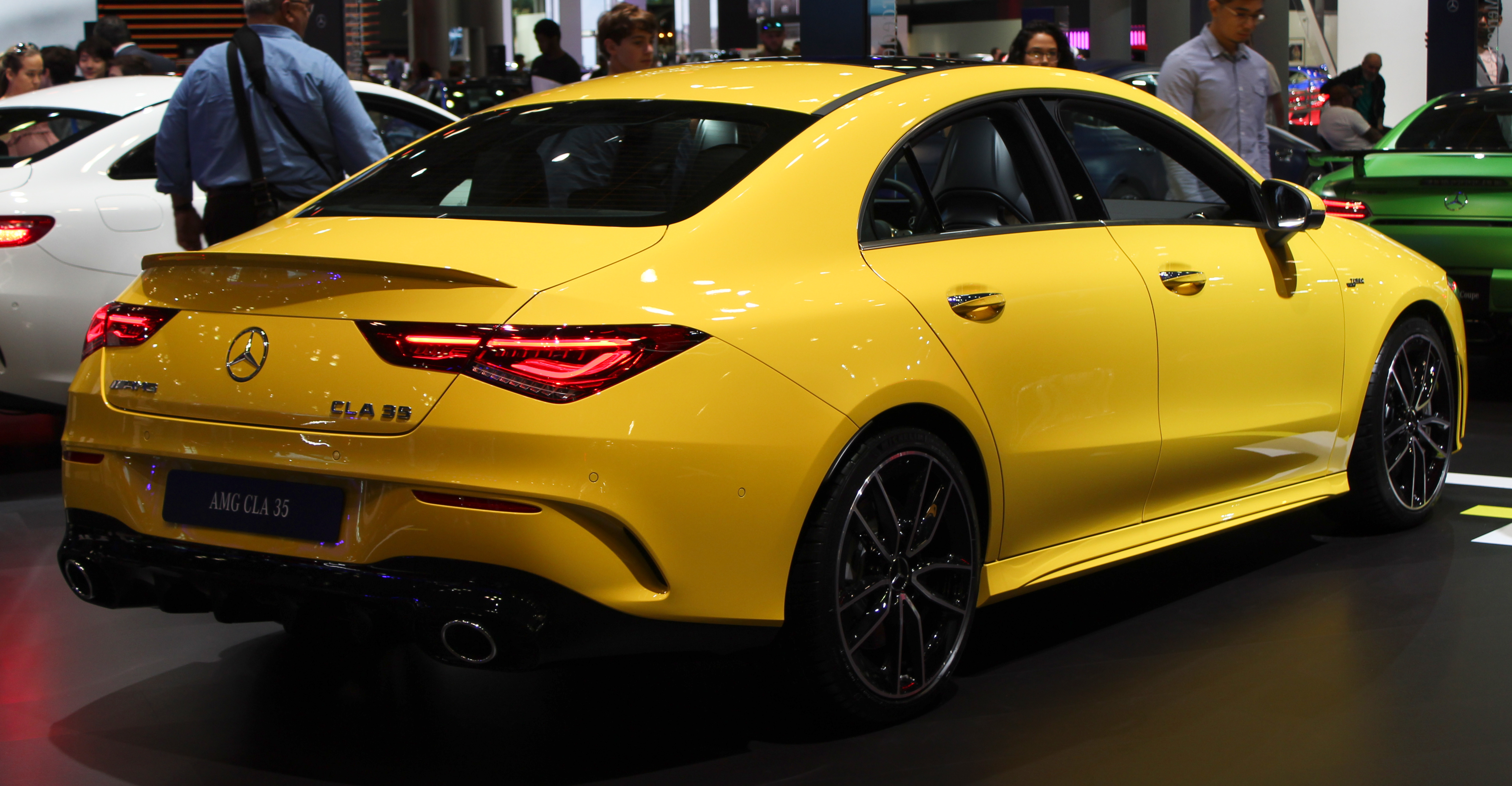
Mercedes-AMG CLA 35 4MATIC

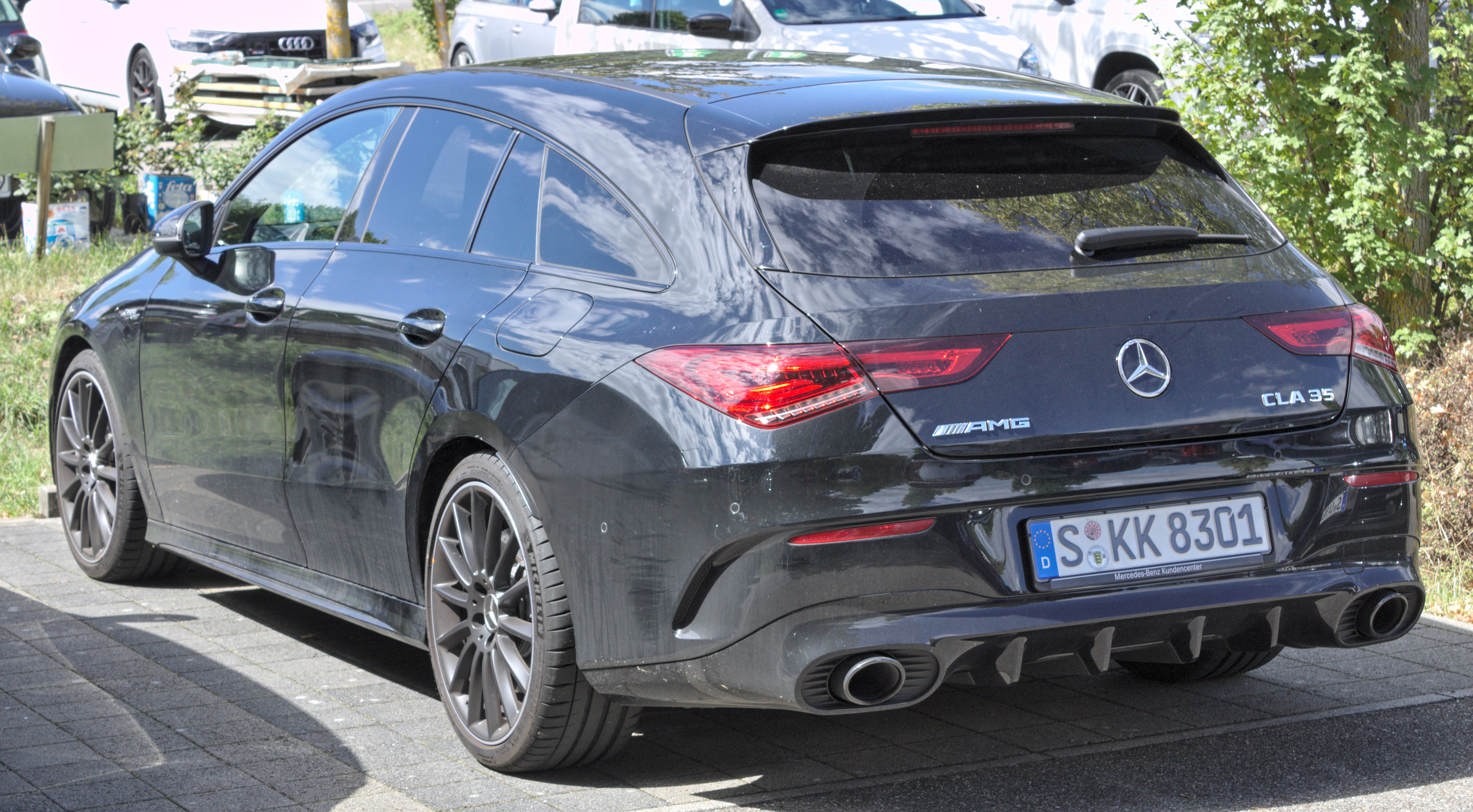
Mercedes-AMG CLA 35 4MATIC Shooting Brake

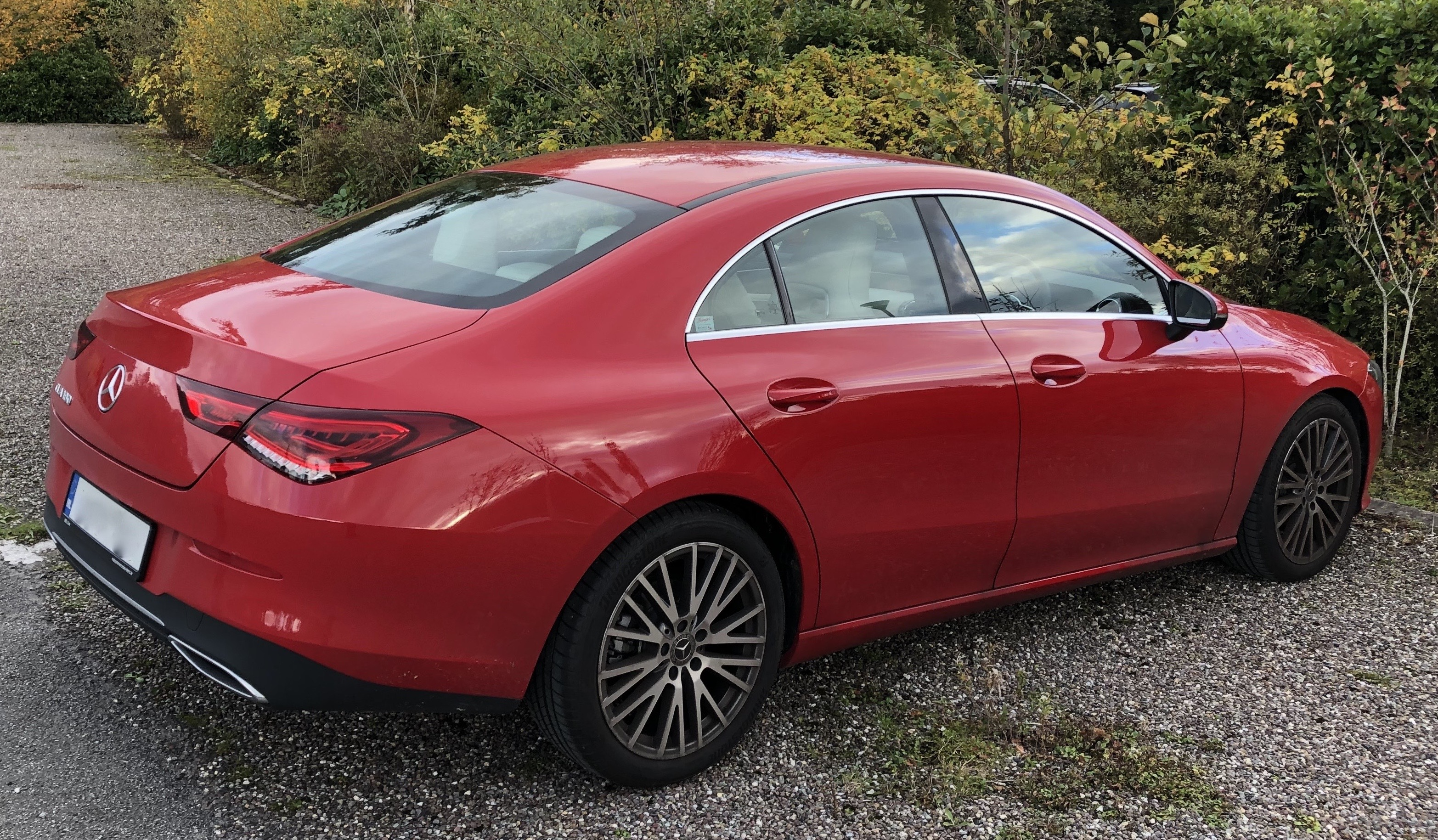
Mercedes-Benz CLA 180

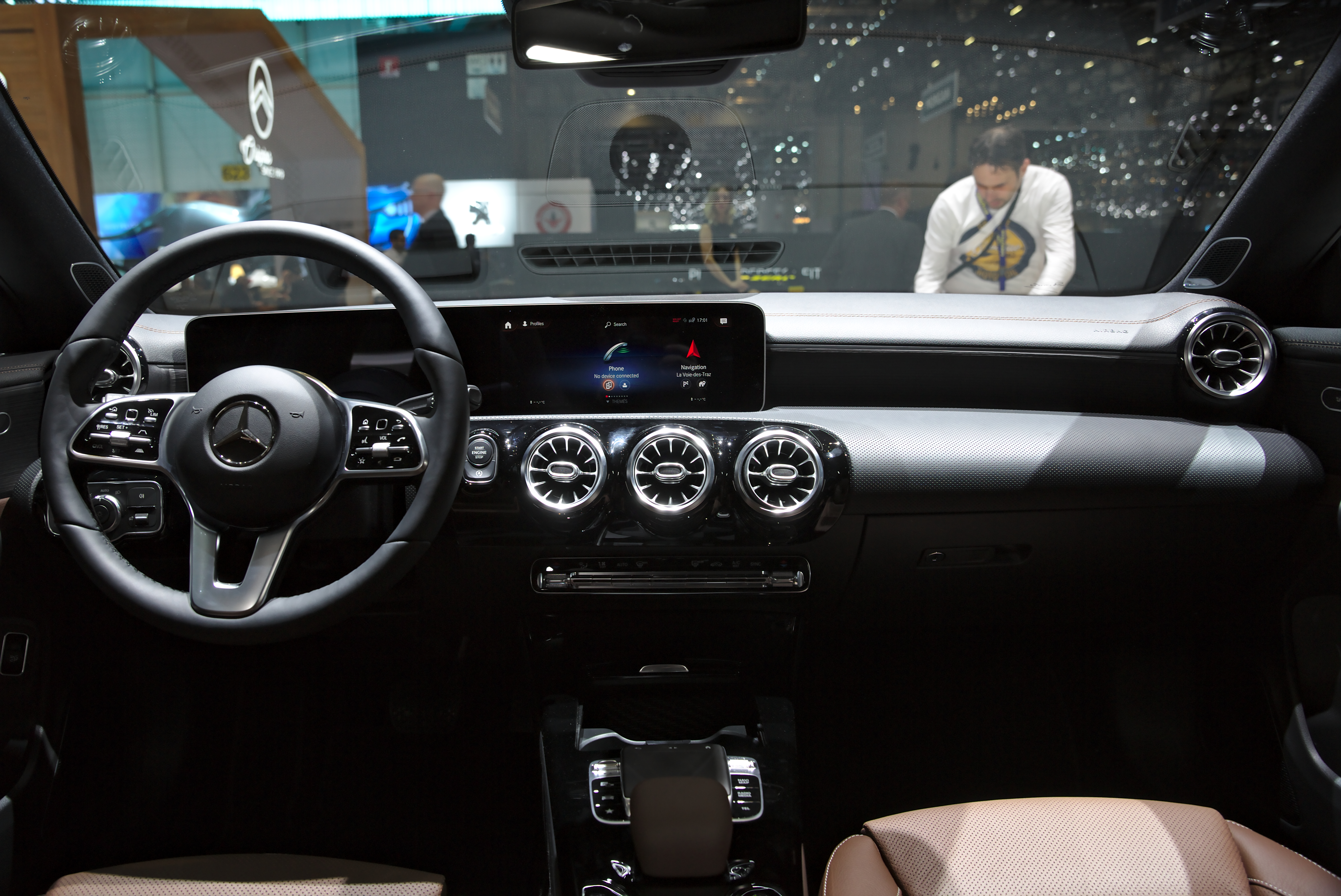
Interior

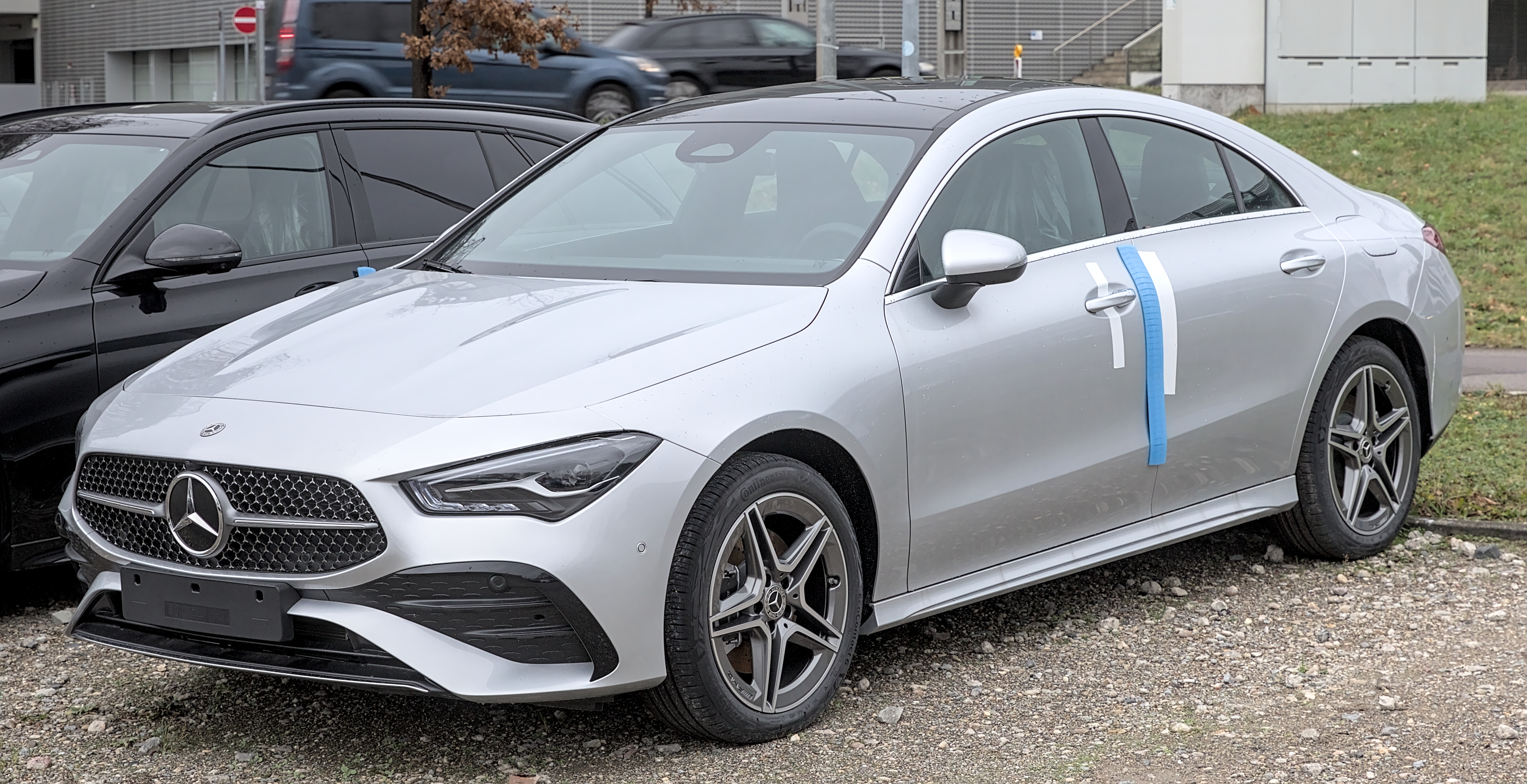
2023 Mercedes-Benz CLA 250 e (facelift)

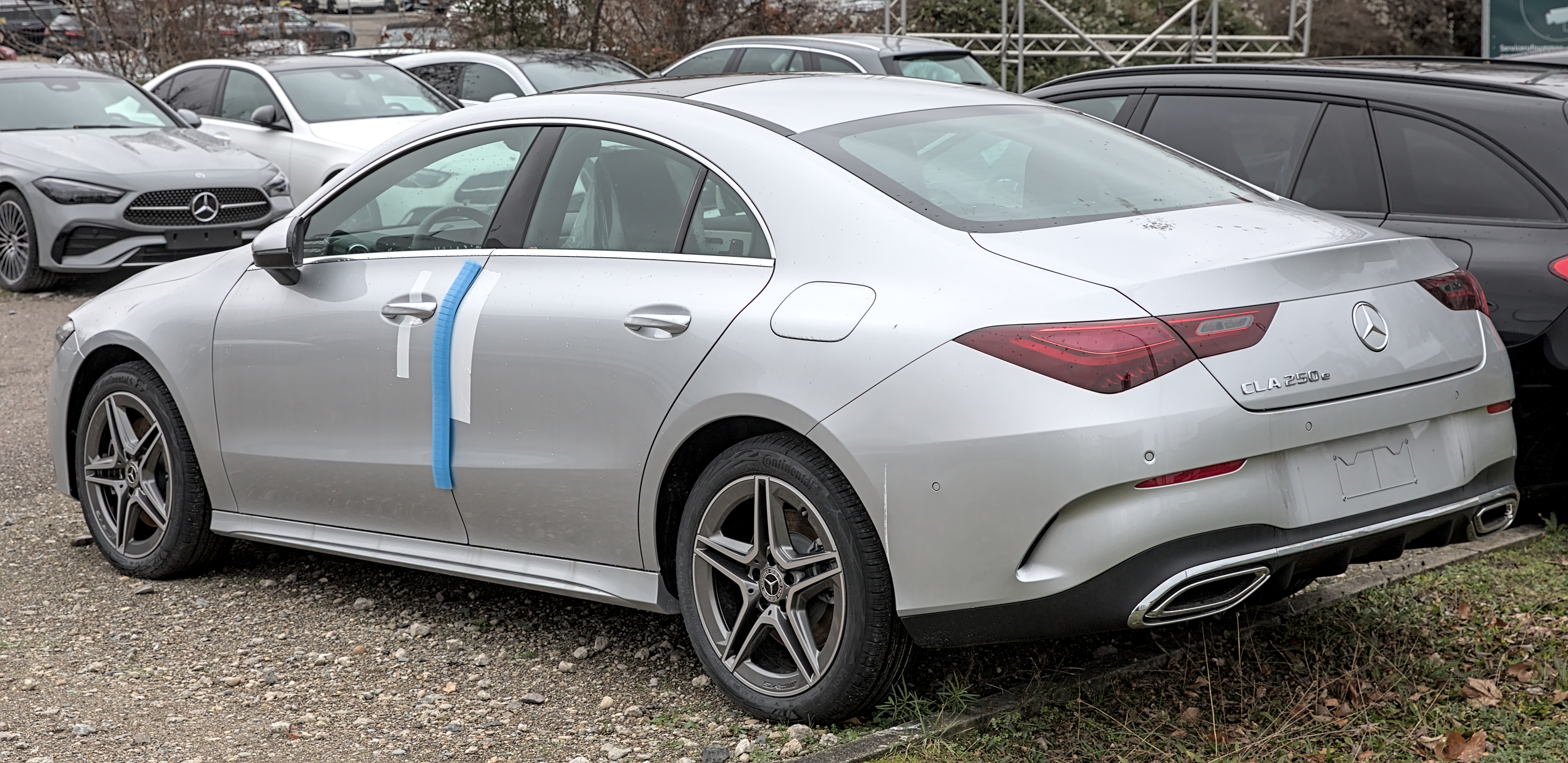
2023 Mercedes-Benz CLA 250 e (facelift)

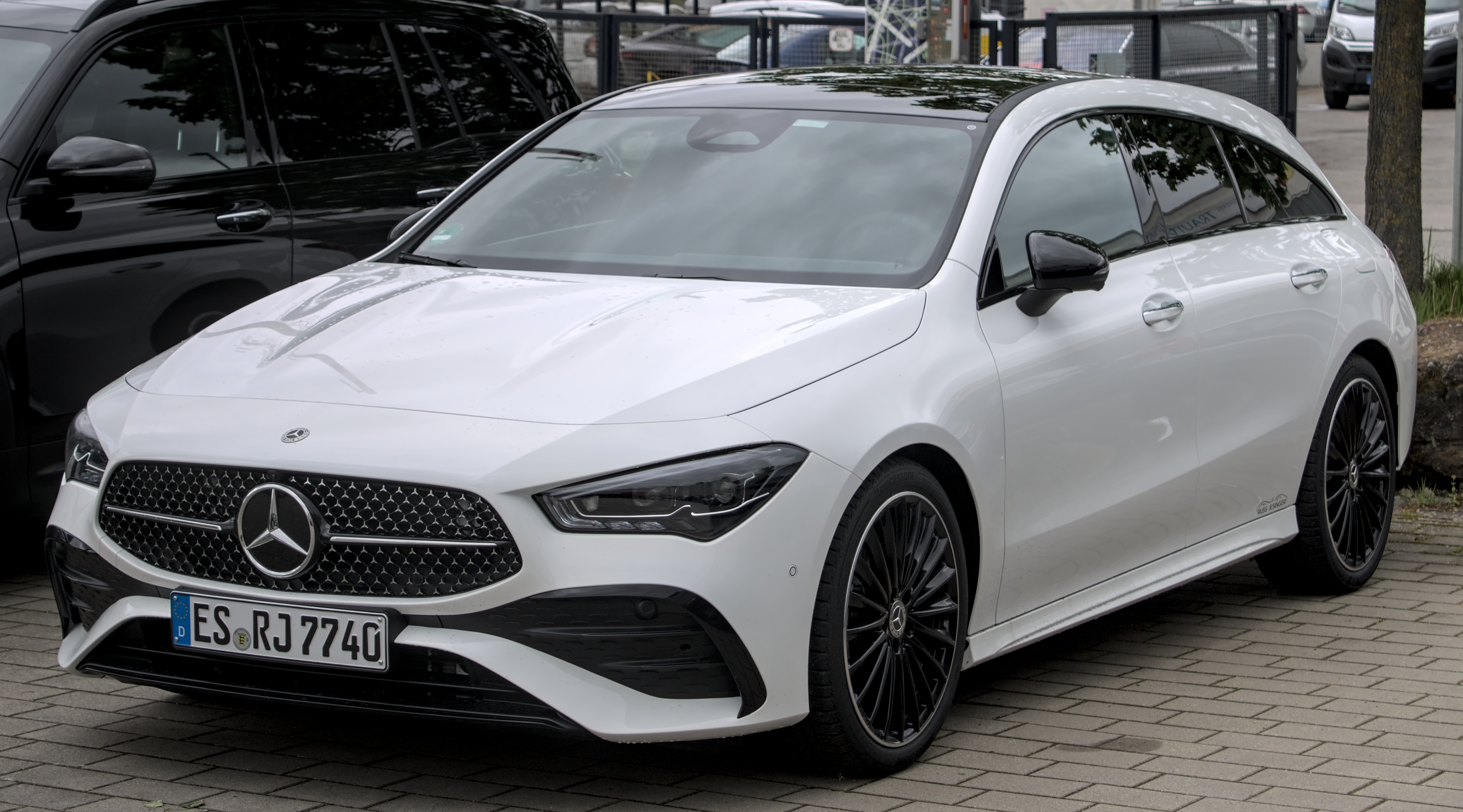
2023 Mercedes-Benz CLA 200 Shooting Brake (facelift)

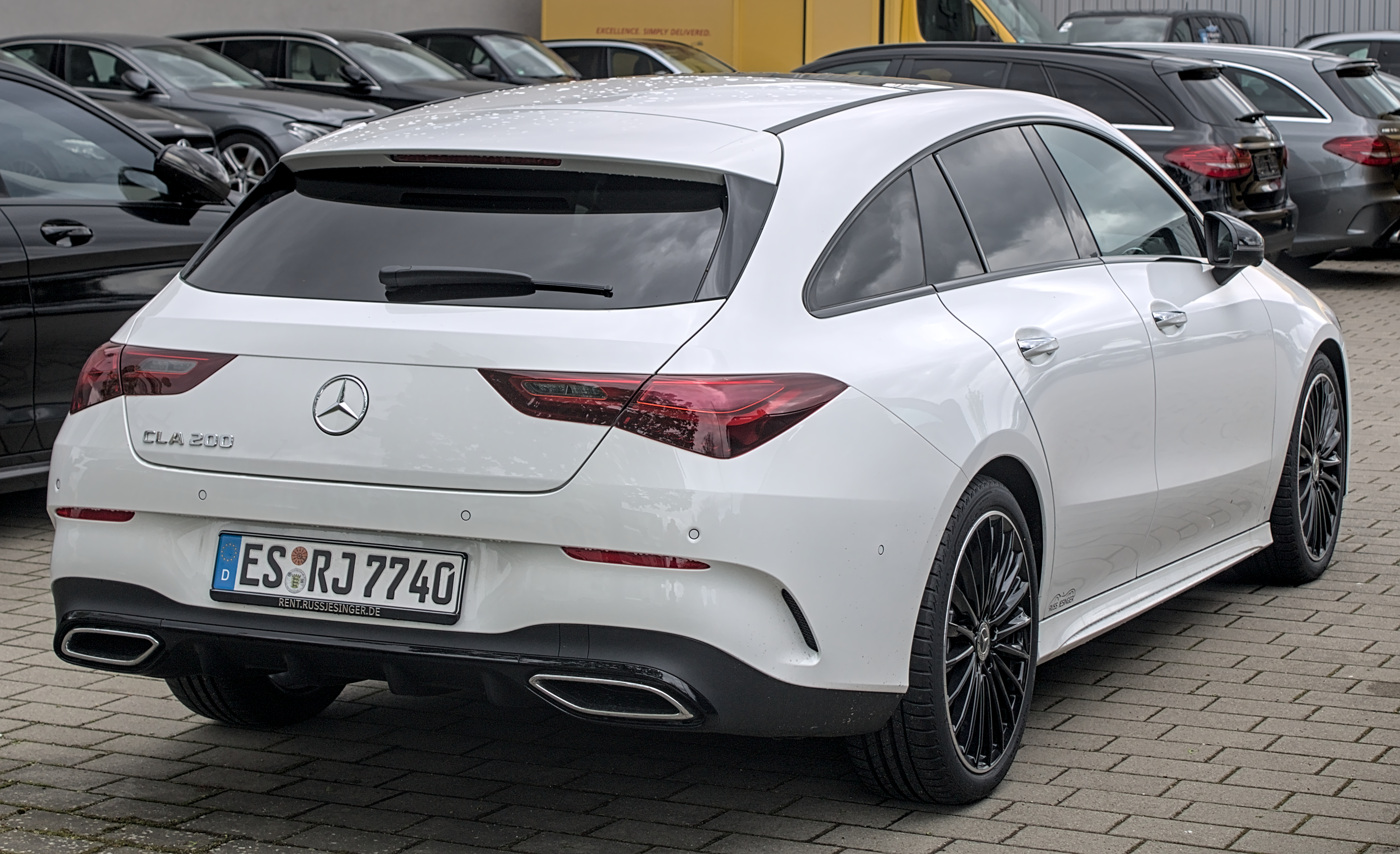
2023 Mercedes-Benz CLA 200 Shooting Brake (facelift)

=== Technical details ===
==== Engines ====
Model	Years	Configuration	Displacement	Power	Torque	0–100 km/h (0–62 mph)	Top speed	Fuel consumption/efficiency (EU-Norm combined)
Petrol engines
CLA 180	03/2019–2025	Inline 4 turbo (M 282 DE 14 AL)	1,332 cc	100 kW (136 PS; 134 hp) at 5,500 rpm	200 N⋅m (148 lbf⋅ft) at 1,460 rpm	9.4 seconds	216 km/h (134 mph)	5.3–5.6 L/100 km (44–42 mpg_{‑US})
CLA 200	03/2019–2025	Inline 4 turbo (M 282 DE 14 AL)	1,332 cc	120 kW (163 PS; 161 hp) at 5,500 rpm	250 N⋅m (184 lbf⋅ft) at 1,620 rpm	8.5 seconds	229 km/h (142 mph)	5.4–5.7 L/100 km (44–41 mpg_{‑US})
CLA 200 4MATIC	10/2020–2025	Inline 4 turbo (M 282 DE 14 AL)	1,332 cc	120 kW (163 PS; 161 hp) at 5,500 rpm	250 N⋅m (184 lbf⋅ft) at 1,620 rpm	8.7 seconds	225 km/h (140 mph)	5.8–6.3 L/100 km (41–37 mpg_{‑US})
CLA 220	03/2019–10/2019	Inline 4 turbo (M 260 DE 20 AL)	1,991 cc	140 kW (190 PS; 188 hp) at 5,500 rpm	300 N⋅m (221 lbf⋅ft) at 1,800 rpm	7.0 seconds	241 km/h (150 mph)	6.0–6.2 L/100 km (39–38 mpg_{‑US})
CLA 220 4MATIC	03/2019–10/2020	Inline 4 turbo (M 260 DE 20 AL)	1,991 cc	140 kW (190 PS; 188 hp) at 5,500 rpm	300 N⋅m (221 lbf⋅ft) at 1,800 rpm	7.0 seconds	237 km/h (147 mph)	6.5–6.7 L/100 km (36–35 mpg_{‑US})
CLA 250	03/2019–2025	Inline 4 turbo (M 260 DE 20 AL)	1,991 cc	165 kW (224 PS; 221 hp) at 5,500-6,100 rpm	350 N⋅m (258 lbf⋅ft) at 1,800-4,000 rpm	6.3 seconds	250 km/h (155 mph)	6.0–6.2 L/100 km (39–38 mpg_{‑US})
CLA 250 4MATIC	03/2019–2025	Inline 4 turbo (M 260 DE 20 AL)	1,991 cc	165 kW (224 PS; 221 hp) at 5,500-6,100 rpm	350 N⋅m (258 lbf⋅ft) at 1,800-4,000 rpm	6.3 seconds	250 km/h (155 mph)	5.3–5.6 L/100 km (44–42 mpg_{‑US})
AMG CLA 35 4MATIC	04/2019–2025	Inline 4 turbo (M 260 DE 20 AL)	1,991 cc	225 kW (306 PS; 302 hp) at 5,500-6,100 rpm	400 N⋅m (295 lbf⋅ft) at 3,000–4,000 rpm	4.9 seconds	250 km/h (155 mph)	7.2–7.3 L/100 km (33–32 mpg_{‑US})
AMG CLA 45 4MATIC+	09/2019–2025	Inline 4 turbo (M 139)	1,991 cc	285 kW (387 PS; 382 hp) at 6,500 rpm	480 N⋅m (354 lbf⋅ft) at 4,750–5,000 rpm	4.1 seconds	250 km/h (155 mph); 270 km/h (168 mph)*	8.1–8.3 L/100 km (29–28 mpg_{‑US})
AMG CLA 45 S 4MATIC+	09/2019–2025	Inline 4 turbo (M 139)	1,991 cc	310 kW (420 PS; 420 hp) at 6,700 rpm	500 N⋅m (369 lbf⋅ft) at 5,000–5,250 rpm	4.0 seconds	270 km/h (168 mph)	8.1–8.3 L/100 km (29–28 mpg_{‑US})
Diesel engines
CLA 180 d	03/2019–10/2020	Inline 4 turbo (OM 608 DE 15 SCR)	1,461 cc	85 kW (116 PS; 114 hp) at 4,000 rpm	260 N⋅m (192 lbf⋅ft) at 1,750–2,500 rpm	10.7 seconds	205 km/h (127 mph)	3.8–4.0 L/100 km (62–59 mpg_{‑US})
CLA 180 d	10/2020–2025	Inline 4 turbo (OM 654q DE 20 SCR)	1,950 cc	85 kW (116 PS; 114 hp) at 4,000 rpm	280 N⋅m (207 lbf⋅ft) at 1,750–2,500 rpm	10.4 seconds	205 km/h (127 mph)	4.7–5.1 L/100 km (50–46 mpg_{‑US})
CLA 200 d	04/2019–2025	Inline 4 turbo (OM 654q DE 20 SCR)	1,950 cc	110 kW (150 PS; 148 hp) at 4,000 rpm	320 N⋅m (236 lbf⋅ft) at 1,400–3,200 rpm	8.3 seconds	226 km/h (140 mph)	4.1–4.4 L/100 km (57–53 mpg_{‑US})
CLA 200 d 4MATIC	10/2019–2025	Inline 4 turbo (OM 654q DE 20 SCR)	1,950 cc	110 kW (150 PS; 148 hp) at 4,000 rpm	320 N⋅m (236 lbf⋅ft) at 1,400–3,200 rpm	8.5 seconds	222 km/h (138 mph)	4.5–5.0 L/100 km (52–47 mpg_{‑US})
CLA 220 d	04/2019–2025	Inline 4 turbo (OM 654q DE 20 SCR)	1,950 cc	140 kW (190 PS; 188 hp) at 4,000 rpm	400 N⋅m (295 lbf⋅ft) at 1,400–3,200 rpm	7.1 seconds	244 km/h (152 mph)	4.3–4.4 L/100 km (55–53 mpg_{‑US})
CLA 220 d 4MATIC	10/2019–2025	Inline 4 turbo (OM 654q DE 20 SCR)	1,950 cc	140 kW (190 PS; 188 hp) at 4,000 rpm	400 N⋅m (295 lbf⋅ft) at 1,400–3,200 rpm	7.0 seconds	238 km/h (148 mph)	4.5–4.9 L/100 km (52–48 mpg_{‑US})
Plug-in hybrid engines
CLA 250 e	03/2020–2025	I4 turbo (M282 DE14 LA)	1,332 cc	116 kW (158 PS; 156 hp)(Engine) / 75 kW (102 PS; 101 hp) (Electric)	250 N⋅m (184 lbf⋅ft)(Engine) / 300 N⋅m (221 lbf⋅ft) (Electric)	6.6 seconds	235 km/h (146 mph)	1.4–1.5 L/100 km (170–160 mpg_{‑US})

==== Transmissions ====
Model	Years	Types
Petrol engines
CLA 180	03/2019–2025	6-speed manual, 7-speed automatic 7G-DCT
CLA 200	03/2019–2025	6-speed manual, 7-speed automatic 7G-DCT
CLA 200 4MATIC	10/2020–2025	8-speed automatic 8G-DCT
CLA 220	03/2019–10/2019	7-speed automatic 7G-DCT
CLA 220 4MATIC	03/2019–10/2020	7-speed automatic 7G-DCT
CLA 250	03/2019–2025	7-speed automatic 7G-DCT
CLA 250 4MATIC	03/2019–2025	7-speed automatic 7G-DCT
CLA 35 AMG	04/2019–2025	7-speed automatic AMG SPEEDSHIFT DCT 7G
CLA 45 AMG 4MATIC+	09/2019–2025	8-speed automatic AMG SPEEDSHIFT DCT 8G
CLA 45 S AMG 4MATIC+	09/2019–2025	8-speed automatic AMG SPEEDSHIFT DCT 8G
Diesel engines
CLA 180 d	03/2019–10/2020	6-speed manual, 7-speed automatic 7G-DCT
CLA 180 d	10/2020–2025	6-speed manual, 8-speed automatic 7G-DCT
CLA 200 d	04/2019–2025	6-speed manual, 8-speed automatic 7G-DCT
CLA 200 d 4MATIC	10/2019–2025	8-speed automatic 8G-DCT
CLA 220 d	04/2019–2025	8-speed automatic 8G-DCT
CLA 220 d 4MATIC	10/2019–2025	8-speed automatic 8G-DCT
Plug-in hybrid engines
CLA 250 e	03/2020–2025	8-speed automatic 8G-DCT

=== Safety ===
Euro NCAP test results* Mercedes-Benz CLA 180 AMG Line (LHD) (2019)
Test	Points	%
Overall:	5 /5 stars	
Adult occupant:	36.6	96%
Child occupant:	44.8	91%
Pedestrian:	44.1	91%
Safety assist:	9.8	75%

ANCAP test results* Mercedes-Benz CLA-Class all variants except AMG CLA35 (2019, aligned with Euro NCAP)
Test	Points	%
Overall:	5 /5 stars	
Adult occupant:	36.6	96%
Child occupant:	45.3	92%
Pedestrian:	44	91%
Safety assist:	9.9	76%

== Third generation (C178/174; 2025) ==
Third generation
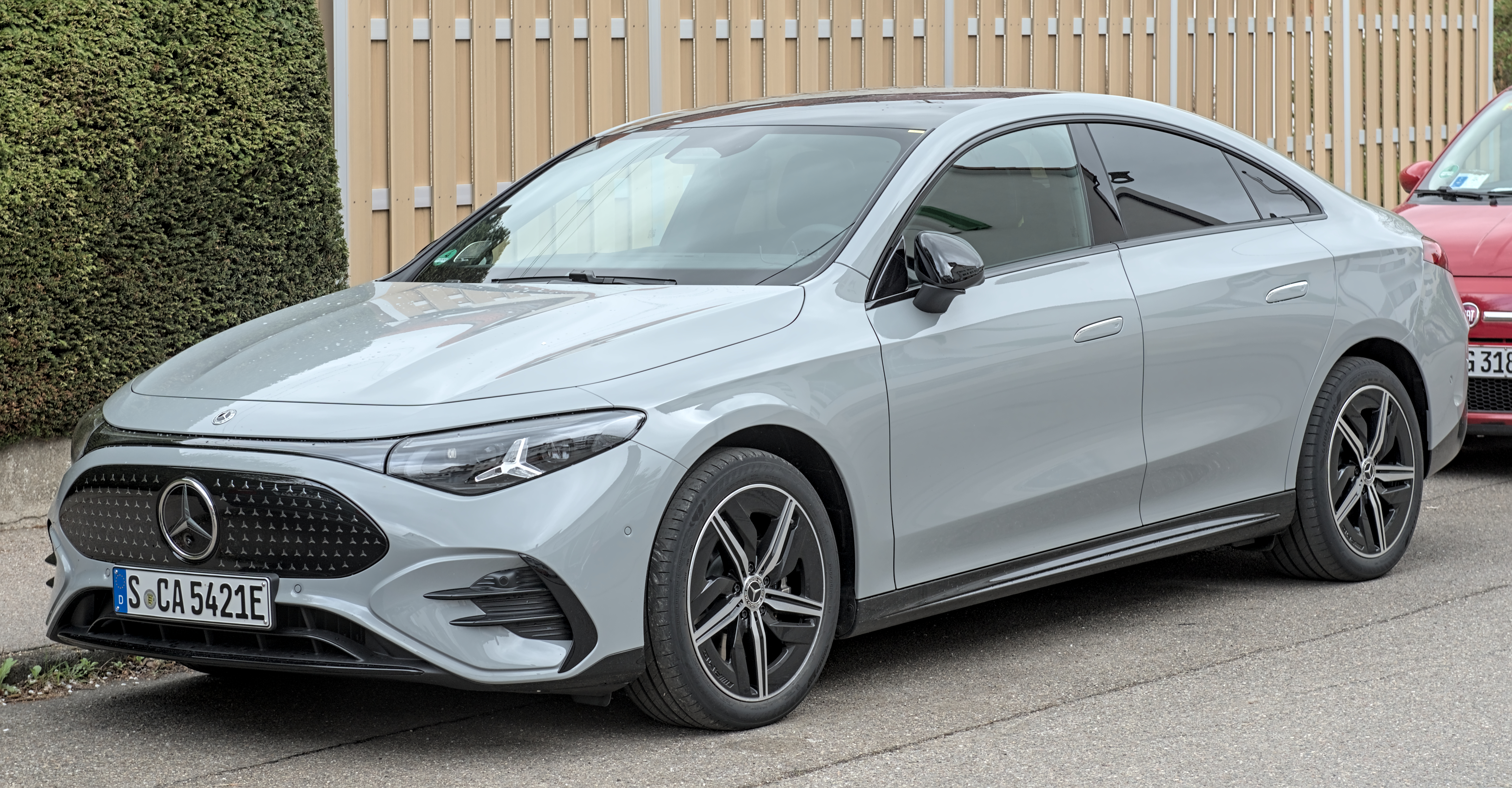
- Mercedes-Benz CLA 350 4Matic

Overview
- Model code: C178; C174 (EV); X178 (shooting brake); X174 (EV shooting brake)
- Production: June 2025 – present
- Assembly: Hungary: Kecskemét (Mercedes-Benz Manufacturing Hungary); Germany: Rastatt (Mercedes Benz Werk Rastatt); China: Beijing (Beijing Benz, L models only); Thailand: Samut Prakan (TAAP)
- Designer: Mayya Markova

Body and chassis
- Layout: Front-engine, front-wheel-drive (hybrid); Front-engine, all-wheel-drive (hybrid, 4matic); Rear-motor, rear-wheel-drive (EV); Dual-motor, all-wheel-drive (EV, 4matic); Tri-motor, all-wheel-drive (AMG CLA 45, 4matic+)
- Platform: Mercedes-Benz Modular Architecture (MMA)
- Related: Mercedes-Benz GLA (H248/244); Mercedes-Benz GLB (X248/244)

Powertrain
- Engine: 1.5L M252 turbo I4 (hybrid)
- Electric motor: 27 PS (20 kW; 27 hp) permanent-magnet motor (hybrid); 1x or 2x Permanent magnet AC synchronous (EV)
- Power output: 116–157 kW (156–211 hp; 158–213 PS) (hybrid, FWD); 137–157 kW (184–211 hp; 186–213 PS) (hybrid, AWD); 167–200 kW (224–268 hp; 227–272 PS) (EV, RWD); 260 kW (349 hp; 354 PS) (EV, AWD); 500 kW (671 hp; 680 PS) (AMG CLA 45)
- Transmission: 8-speed dual-clutch (hybrid); 2-speed automatic (EV)
- Hybrid drivetrain: High-tech Hybrid (Parallel)
- Battery: Lithium-ion: 1.3 kWh 48V (hybrid); 58.0 kWh LFP (EV); 85.0 kWh Li-NMC (EV); 94.0 kWh CATL Li-NMC (AMG CLA 45)
- Range: 694–792 km (431–492 mi) (EV RWD, claimed); 672–771 km (418–479 mi) (EV AWD, claimed)
- Plug-in charging: 320 kW (DC)

Dimensions
- Wheelbase: 2,790 mm (109.8 in); 2,830 mm (111.4 in) (CLA L)
- Length: 4,723 mm (185.9 in); 4,763 mm (187.5 in) (CLA L)
- Width: 1,855 mm (73.0 in); 1,836 mm (72.3 in) (CLA L)
- Height: 1,468 mm (57.8 in); 1,471 mm (57.9 in) (CLA L)
- Kerb weight: 2,045–2,135 kg (4,508–4,707 lb) (EV Sedan) 1,695–1,770 kg (3,737–3,902 lb) (PHEV Sedan) 2,065–2,155 kg (4,553–4,751 lb) (EV Shooting Brake) 1,710–1,785 kg (3,770–3,935 lb) (PHEV Shooting Brake)

The third-generation CLA, officially marketed as CLA with EQ Technology, was unveiled on 13 March 2025, firstly as a sedan. The CLA is the first model to be based on the Mercedes-Benz Modular Architecture (MMA) platform.

For the first time for Mercedes, the combustion-engine and battery electric models of the CLA feature identical designs for the exterior and interior, as well as sharing a model name. This marks the end to Mercedes’ strategy of entirely bespoke battery electric models being developed to sit alongside their combustion-engine equivalents, such as with the E-Class and EQE.

The battery models come with an 800-volt electrical architecture and advanced drive units with a two-speed transmission on the main drive at the rear axle. It can recharge up to 325 km (202 mi) of range in just 10 minutes and fast DC charging up to 320 kW.

The Shooting Brake model was unveiled on 14 July 2025, as the first battery electric station wagon from Mercedes-Benz. The Shooting Brake model will not be available in North America (United States and Canada).

The third-generation CLA was awarded as the 2026 European Car of the Year, becoming the second Mercedes-Benz to won the European award after the Mercedes-Benz 450SE.

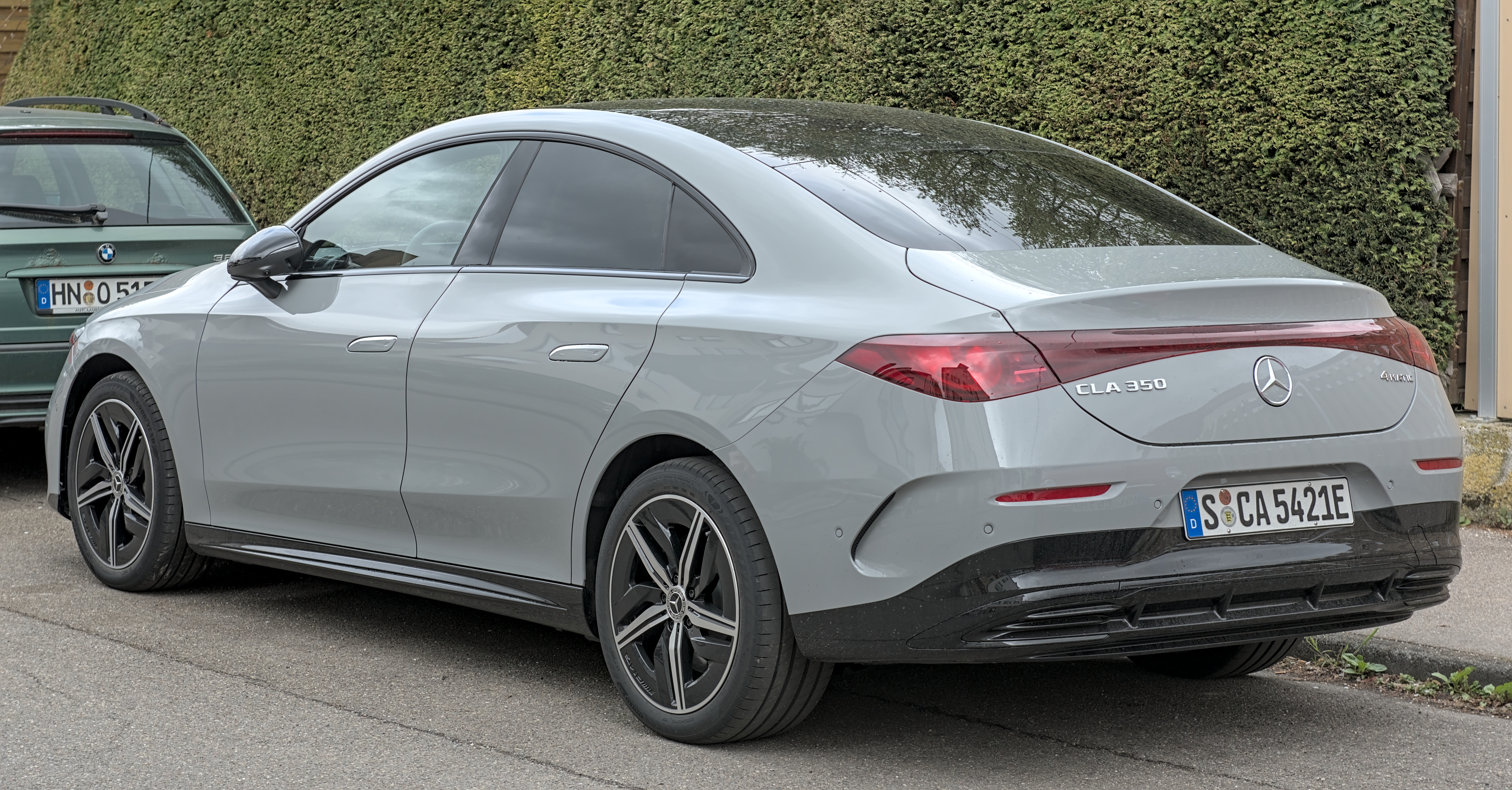
2025 Mercedes-Benz CLA 350 4Matic (rear view)

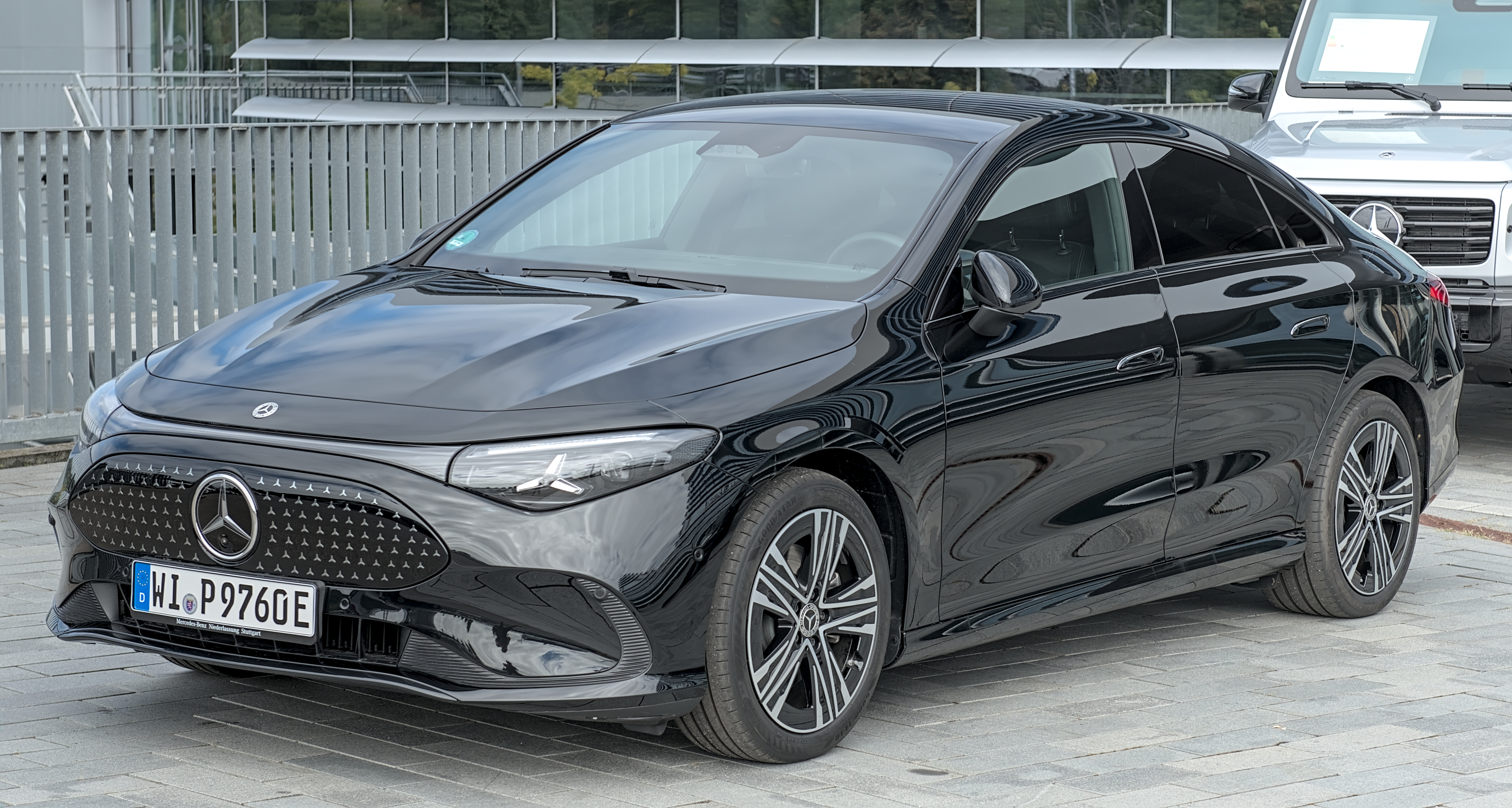
2025 Mercedes-Benz CLA 250+

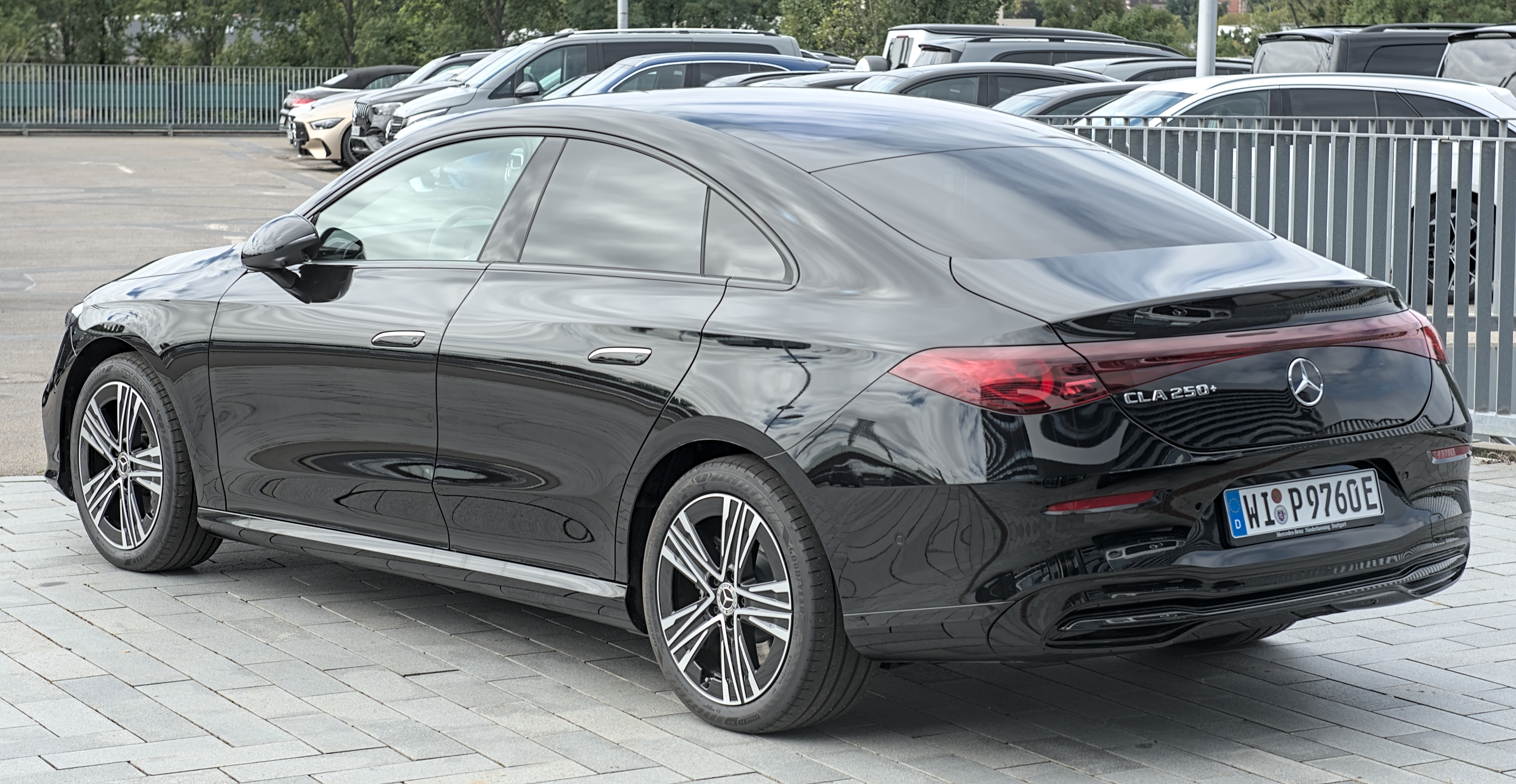
2025 Mercedes-Benz CLA 250+ (rear view)

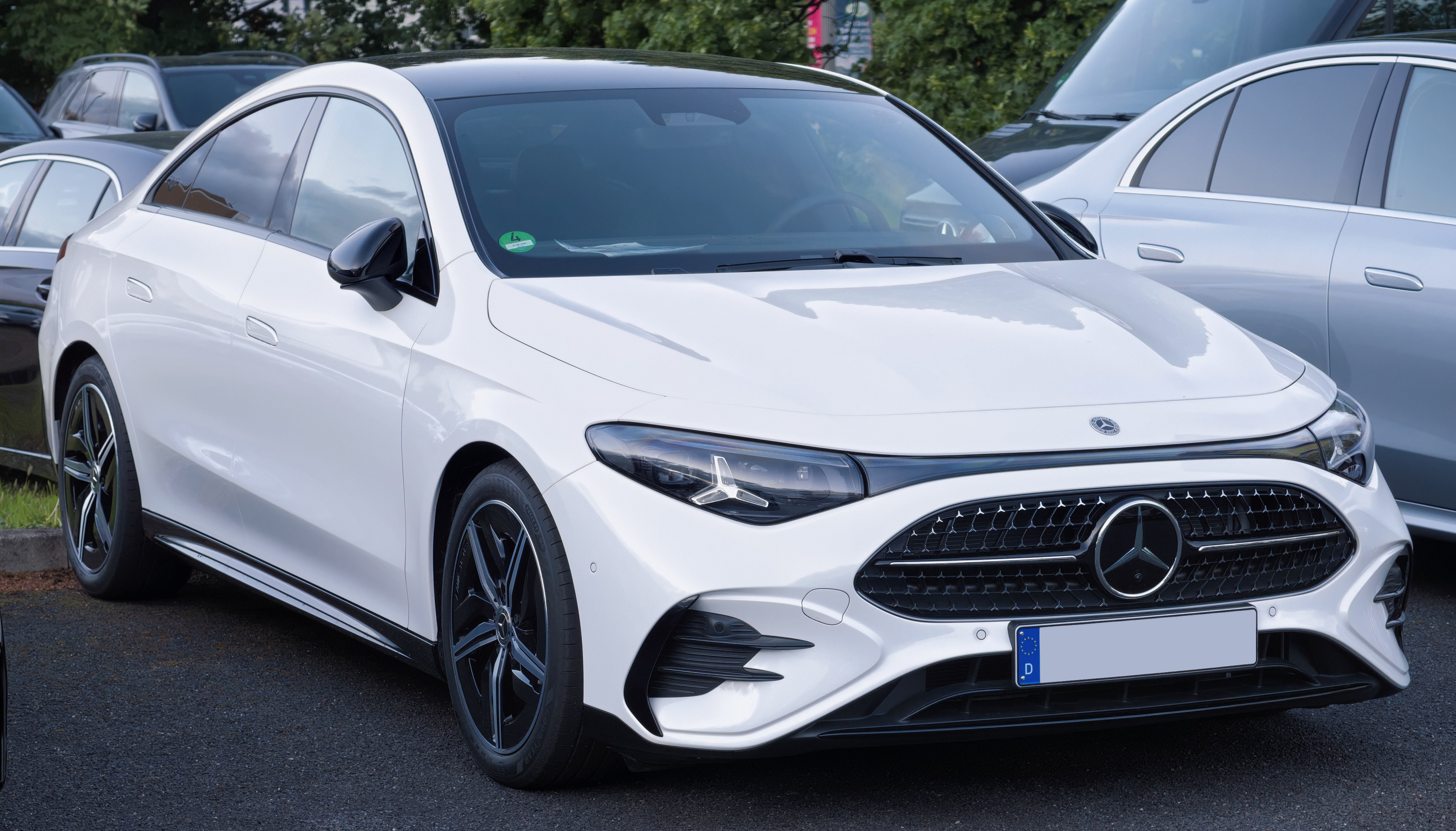
2025 Mercedes-Benz CLA 220 4Matic (ICE)

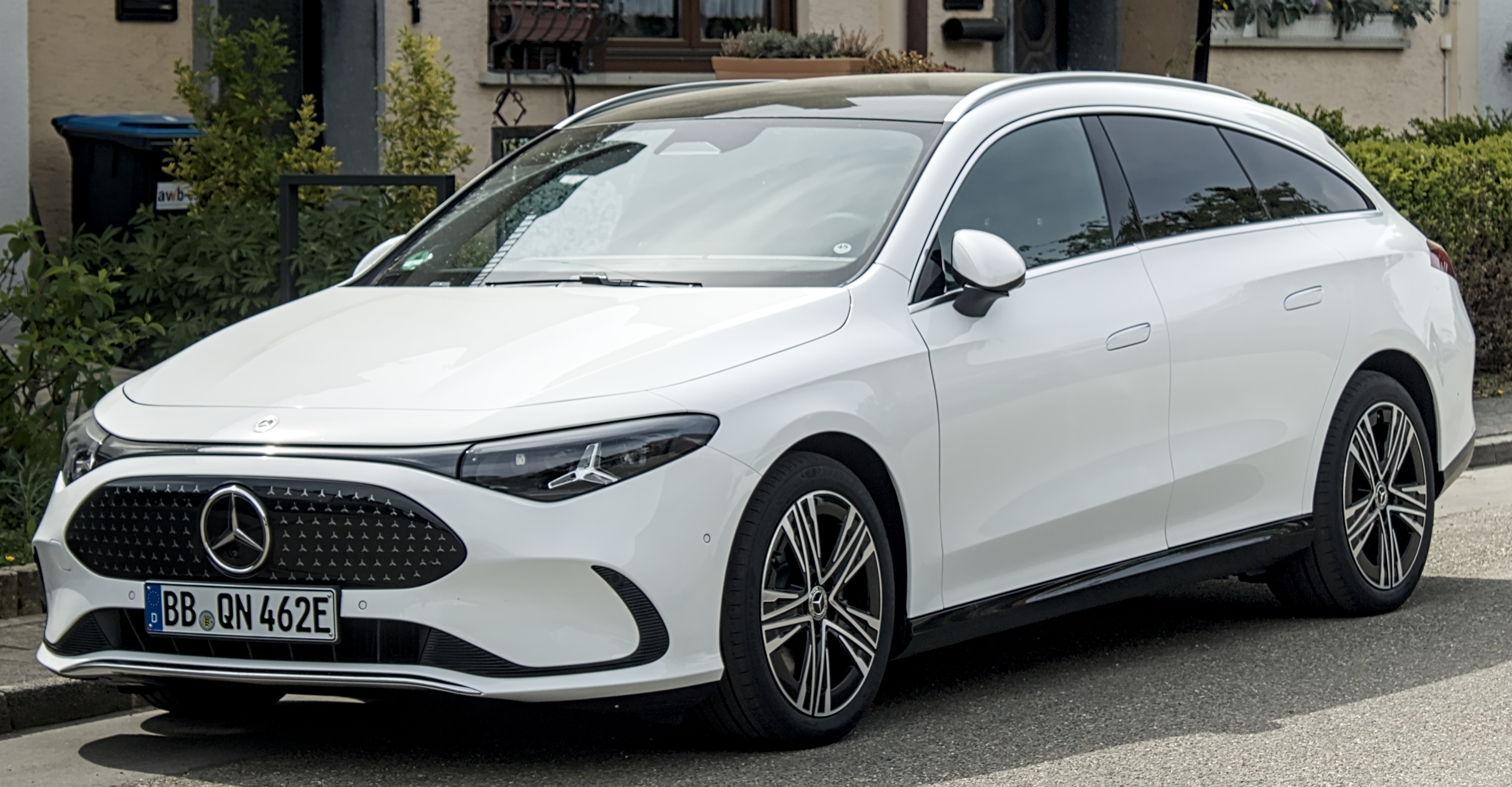
Mercedes-Benz CLA 350 Shooting Brake

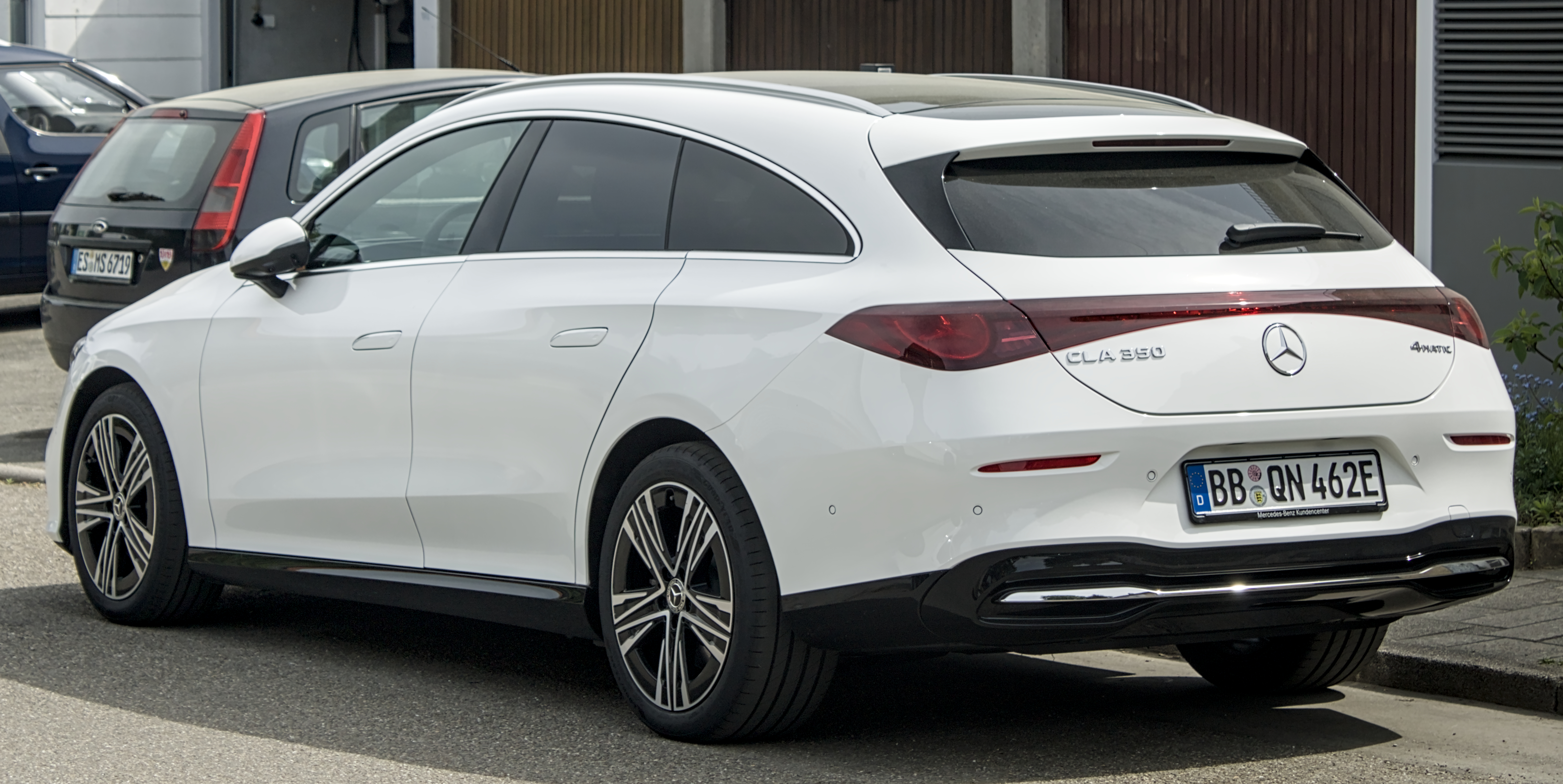
Mercedes-Benz CLA 350 Shooting Brake (rear view)

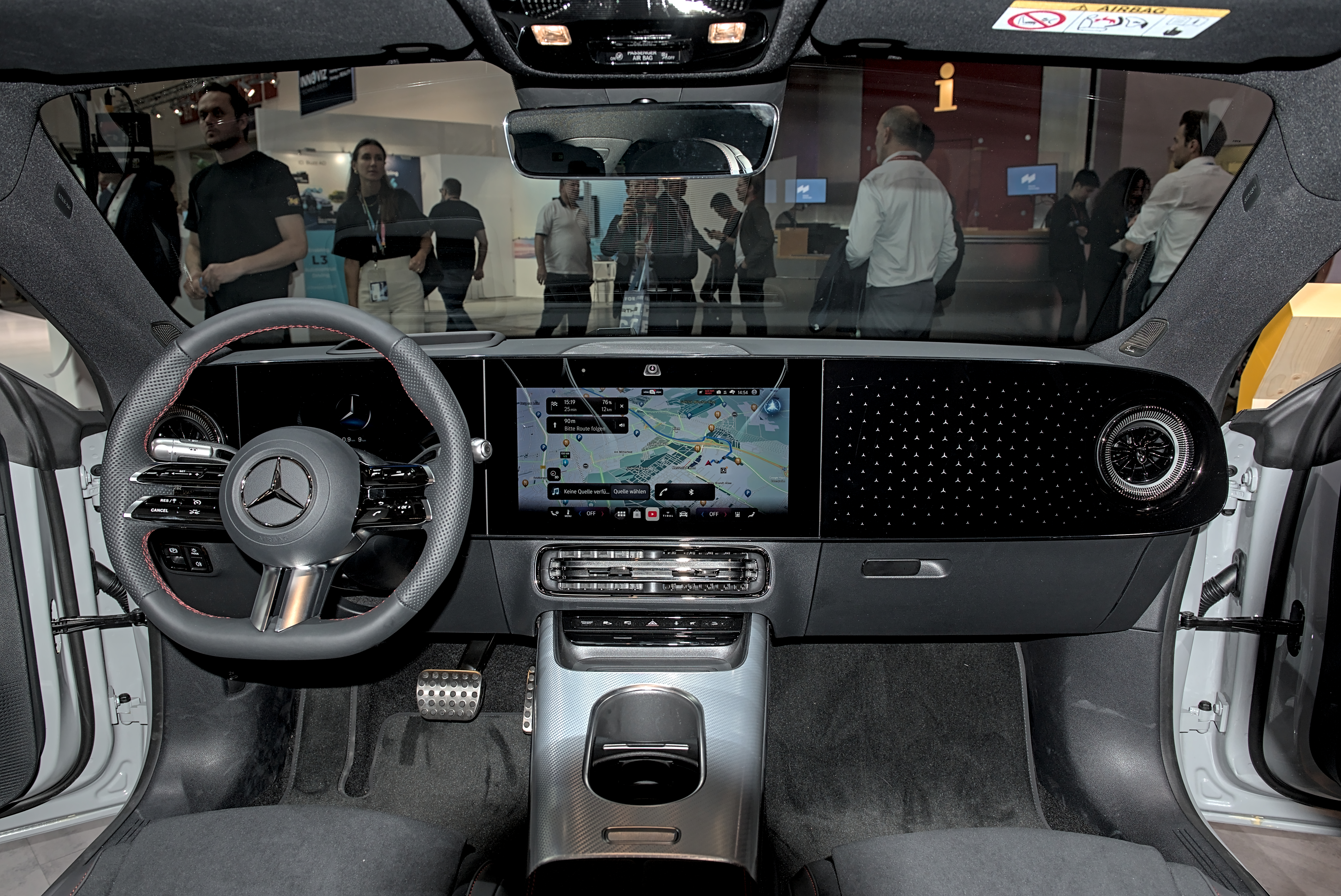
Interior

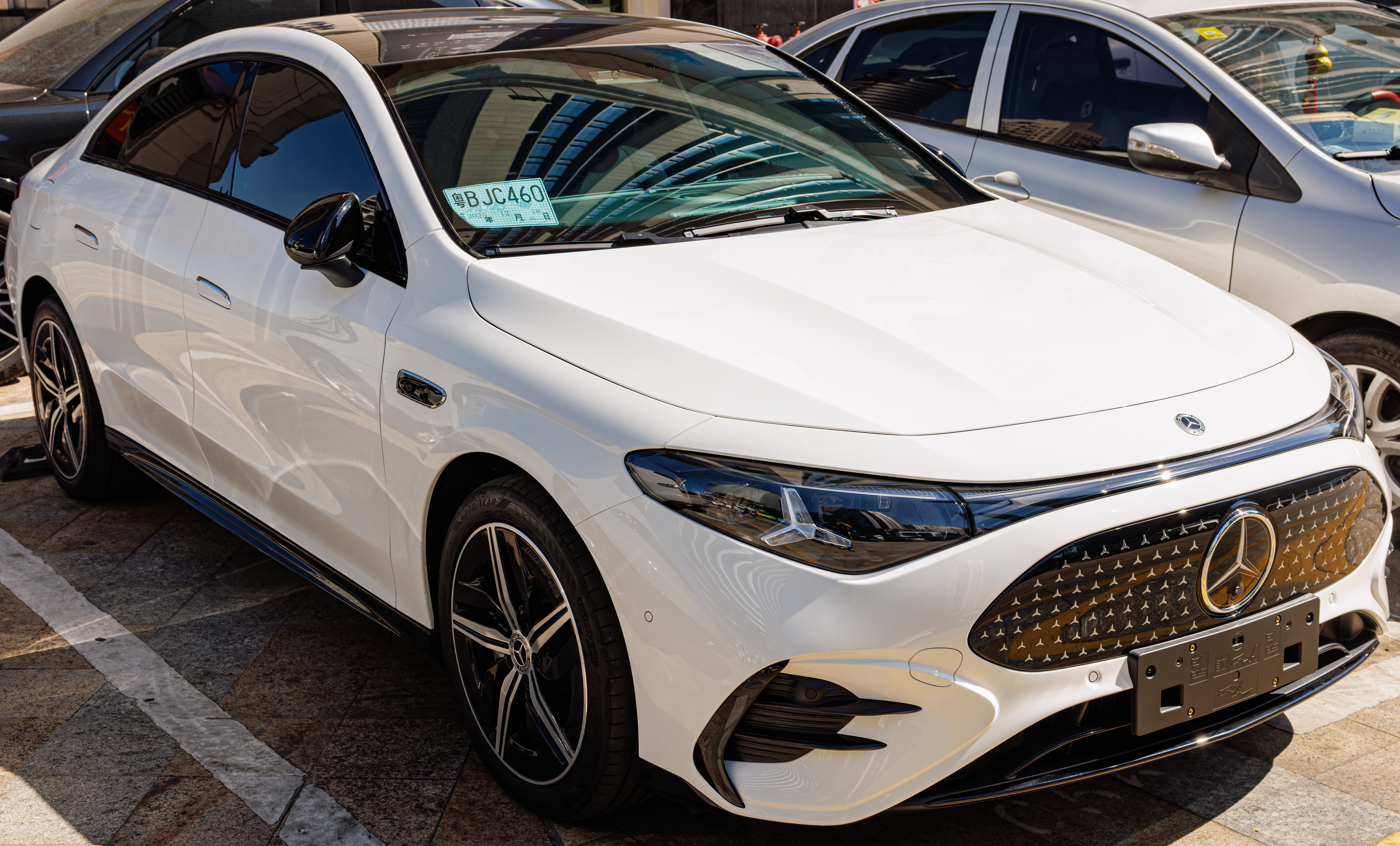
Mercedes-Benz CLA L (China)

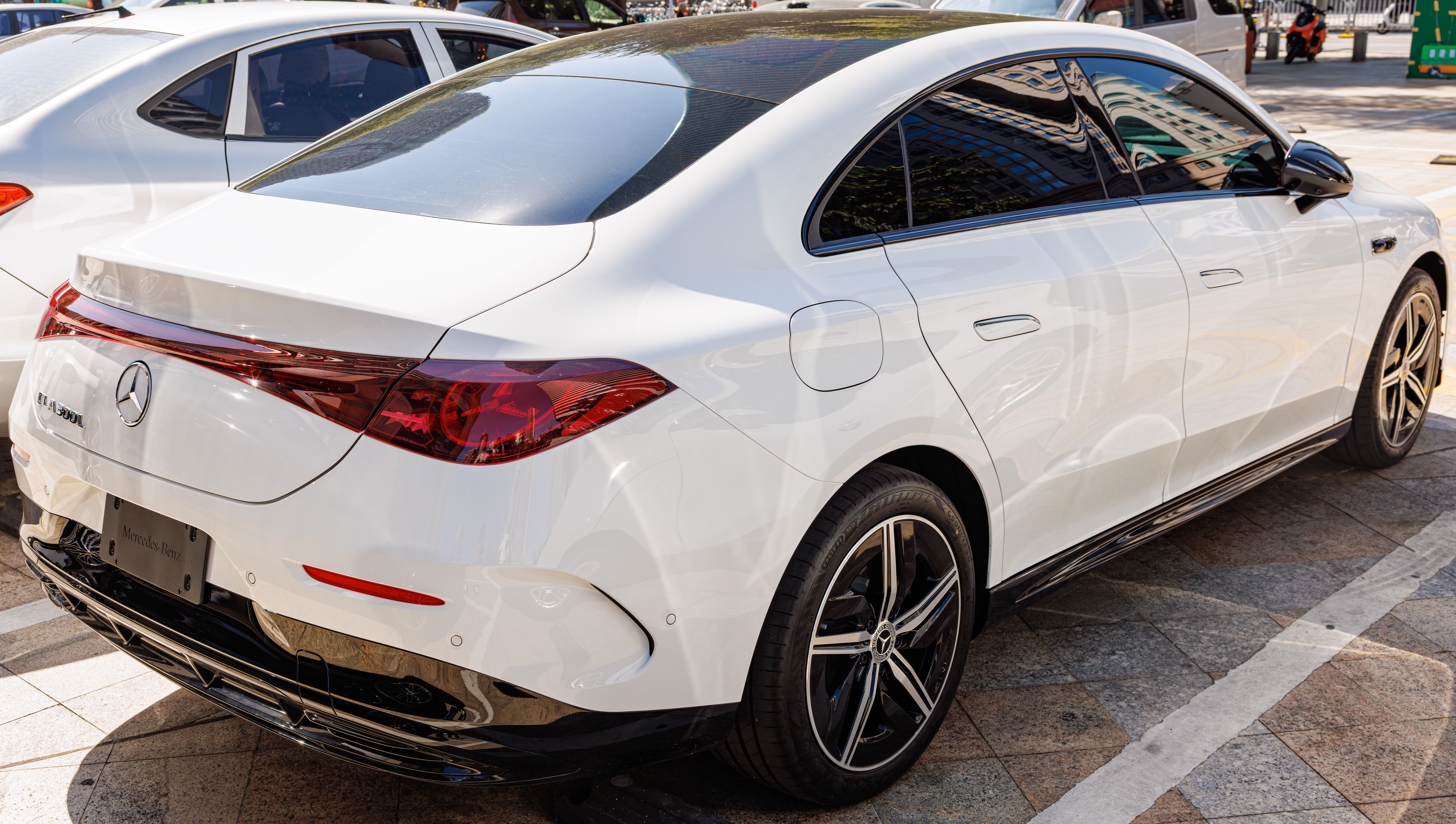
Mercedes-Benz CLA L (China; rear view)

=== Exterior ===
The third-generation CLA adopts Mercedes-Benz Sensual Purity design language and the design was inspired by the Concept CLA-Class previewed at the 2023 Munich Motor Show.

The front fascia features a shark nose design. The battery electric model features an illuminated panel with a total of 142 illuminated chrome-effect stars and an illuminated star logo (depends on market-specific regulations), whereas the combustion-engine model has a traditional open grille needed for cooling airflow to the engine. The LED headlights are connected with a thin LED light strip and the optional MULTIBEAM LED headlights features the daytime running lights in the shape of the Mercedes-Benz star.

For the side, there are frameless doors and retractable flushed door handles. Mercedes-Benz engineers have tried to make use of additional headroom compared to its predecessor with a less of an inward curve to the side windows. All CLA models feature as standard a fixed panoramic glass roof helps to contribute for additional headroom for the rear occupants. The Shooting Brake has a lengthened roof from the B-pillar to include a full length panoramic glass roof made from heat insulated safety glass, it features 158 illuminated stars and an optional electrochromic function which changes the glass from clear to opaque.

The rear fascia has a GT-inspired design. It has star shaped LED taillights connected with a light band with coming-home and leaving-home lighting animations, gloss black rear diffuser and the numberplate is housed on the rear bumper.

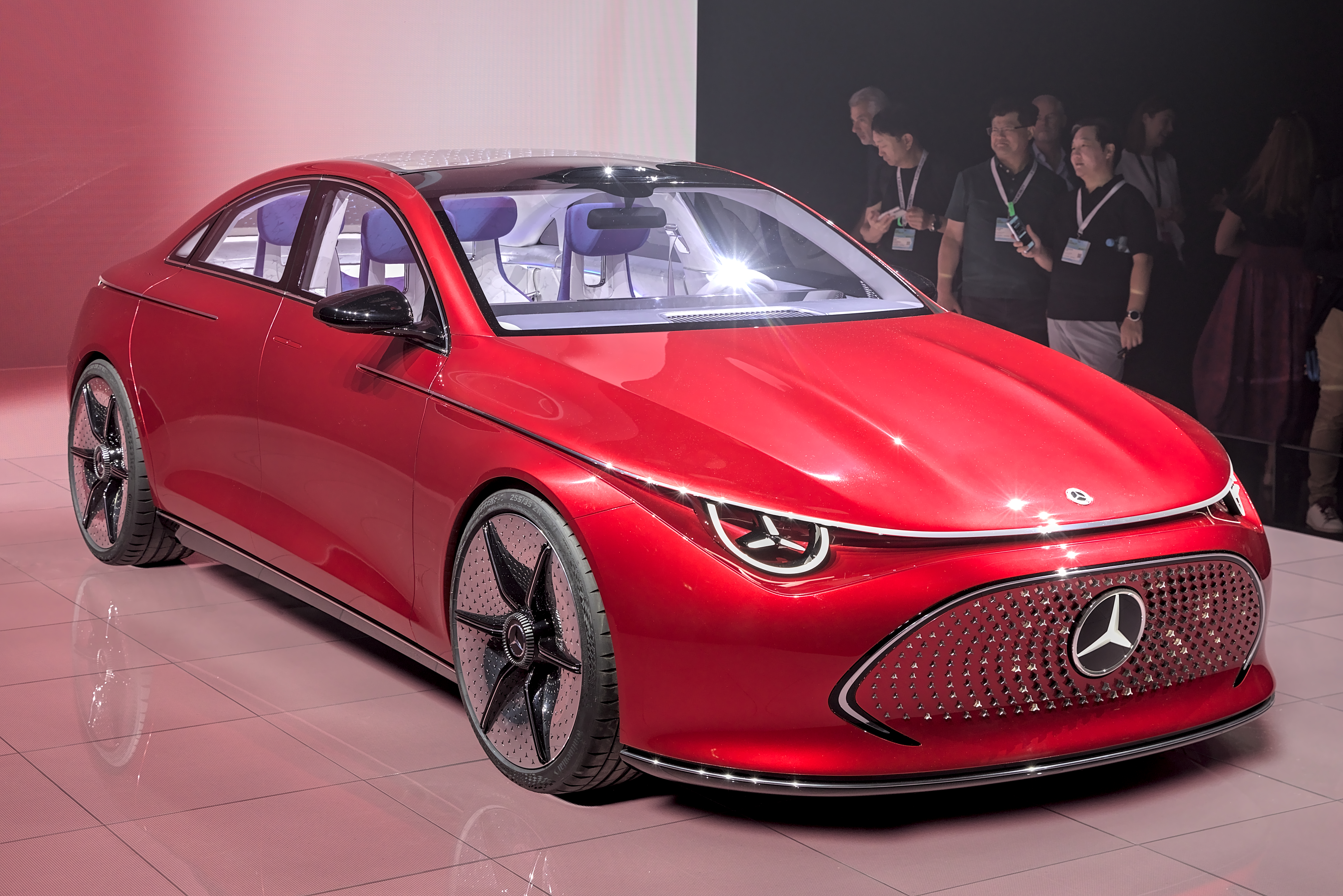
Concept CLA at the 2023 Munich Motor Show

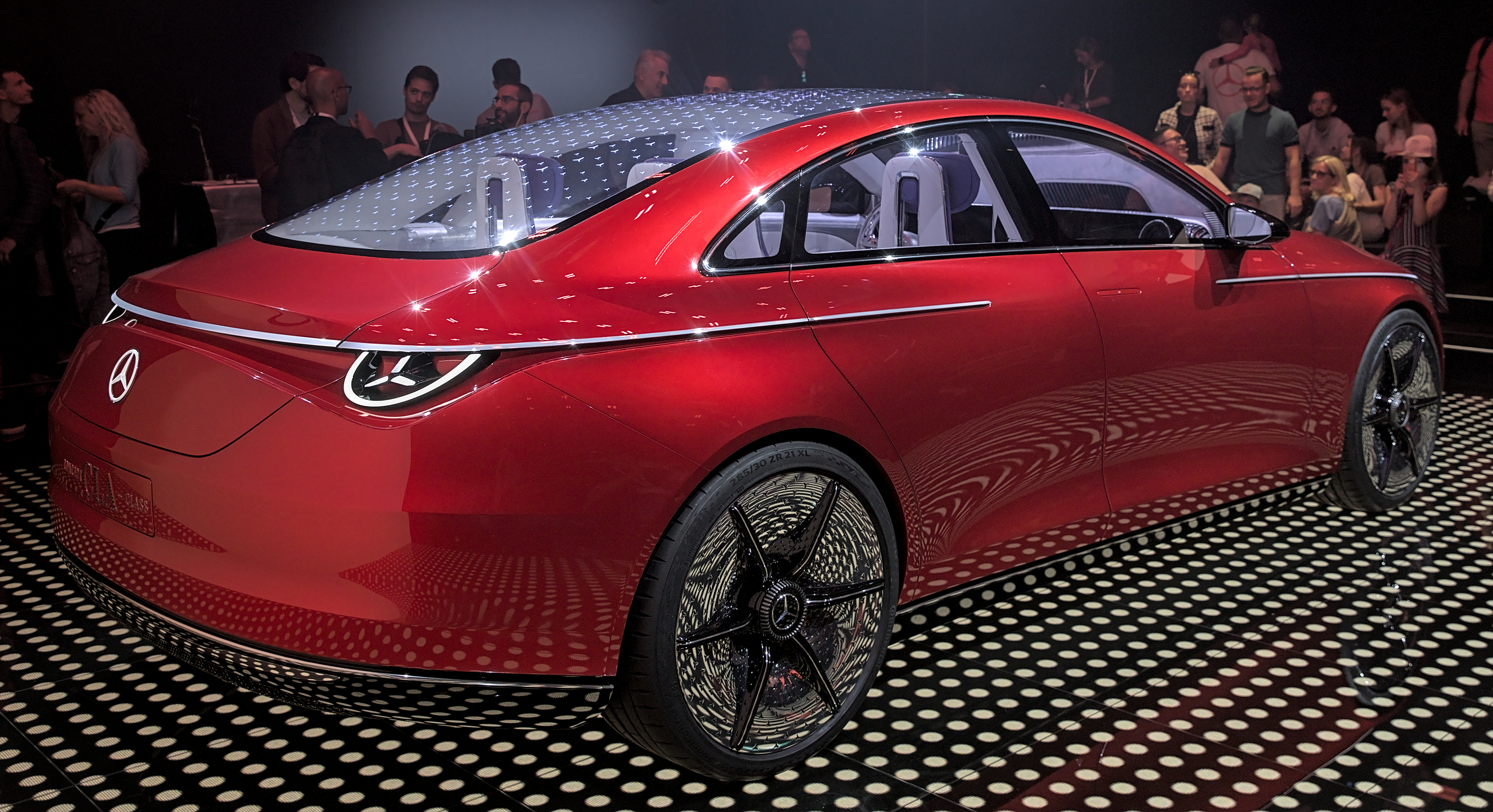
Concept CLA

=== Interior ===
The third-generation CLA is the first car to operate entirely on the in-house developed Mercedes-Benz Operating System (MB.OS) - using QNX for the safety-related functions and the dash cluster, and Linux for the infotainment - marks the fourth MBUX generation, which is the first in-car infotainment system to integrate artificial intelligence (AI) from both Microsoft and Google. The MBUX Virtual Assistant based on ChatGPT4o, Google Gemini and Microsoft Bing.

The interior has the MBUX Superscreen that has a 10.25-inch digital instrument cluster and a 14-inch touchscreen infotainment system. The infotainment system features a Zero Layer mode shows the essential controls and information on the home screen, like the most recently used apps. The navigation system is based on Google Maps and the user interface from Mercedes-Benz. The MBUX Superscreen is also available with an additional 14-inch screen for the front passenger as an optional extra and the screen features eye-tracking technology to ensure the driver is not distracted. If not equipped with the front passenger screen, it is replaced with a glass panel with LED illuminated star logos matching the interior ambient lighting.

The sedan model has a boot capacity of 405 L (14.3 cu ft), while the Shooting Brake model has a boot capacity of 455 L (16.1 cu ft). The CLA with EQ Technology is the first Mercedes-Benz with a frunk of 101 L (3.6 cu ft) since the Mercedes-Benz 130 from the 1930s.

=== Safety ===
The third-generation CLA features a bundle of driver assistance systems under the name MB.DRIVE which includes: DRIVE ASSIST, DRIVE ASSIST PLUS, DRIVE ASSIST PRO, DRIVE PARKING ASSIST and DRIVE PARKING ASSIST 360. Technical details for the driving assistance systems include five radar sensors, eight cameras, 12 ultrasonic sensors and a water-cooled supercomputers with regular over-the-air updates. For the first time in its segment, the CLA is available with a central airbag integrated into the driver’s seat backrest and deploys between the driver and front passenger in the event of a severe side impact.

Euro NCAP test results Mercedes-Benz CLA 250+ AMG Line (2025)
Test	Points	%
Overall:	5 /5 stars	
Adult occupant:	37.7	94%
Child occupant:	43.7	89%
Pedestrian:	58.6	93%
Safety assist:	15.5	85%

ANCAP test results Mercedes-Benz CLA (2025, aligned with Euro NCAP)
Test	Points	%
Overall:	5 /5 stars	
Adult occupant:	37.73	94%
Child occupant:	43.15	88%
Pedestrian:	58.61	93%
Safety assist:	15.42	85%

=== Technical details ===
==== Engines ====
ICE drivetrains
===== Model =====	Years	Configuration	Displacement	Transmission	Power	0-100 km/h (0-62 mph)	Torque	Top speed	Fuel consumption / efficiency (EU-Norm combined)
CLA 180	11/2025 - present	Inline 4 turbo (M252) + 22kW electric motor (FWD / AWD)	1499 cc	8-Speed dual-clutch automatic transmission (8F-eDCT) w/ integrated electric motor	136+30 hp	8,8 s	200 Nm	218 km/h / 135 mph	4,9 l/100 km - 56.5 mpg (UK)
CLA 200	11/2025 - present	Inline 4 turbo (M252) + 22kW electric motor (FWD / AWD)	1499 cc	8-Speed dual-clutch automatic transmission (8F-eDCT) w/ integrated electric motor	163+30 hp	8 s	250 Nm	232 km/h / 144 mph	4,9 l/100 km - 56.5 mpg (UK)
CLA 200 4MATIC	11/2025 - present	Inline 4 turbo (M252) + 22kW electric motor (FWD / AWD)	1499 cc	8-Speed dual-clutch automatic transmission (8F-eDCT) w/ integrated electric motor	163+30 hp	7,9 s	250 Nm	228 km/h / 144 mph	5,2 l/100 km - 55.4 mpg (UK)
CLA 220	11/2025 - present	Inline 4 turbo (M252) + 22kW electric motor (FWD / AWD)	1499 cc	8-Speed dual-clutch automatic transmission (8F-eDCT) w/ integrated electric motor	190+30 hp	7,2 s	300 Nm	240 km/h / 149 mph	5,1 l/100 km - NC (UK)
CLA 220 4MATIC	11/2025 - present	Inline 4 turbo (M252) + 22kW electric motor (FWD / AWD)	1499 cc	8-Speed dual-clutch automatic transmission (8F-eDCT) w/ integrated electric motor	190+30 hp	7,1 s	300 Nm	237 km/h / 147 mph	5,5 l/100 km - 51.4 mpg (UK)
Electric drivetrains
Model	Years	Configuration	Battery capacity (usable)	Transmission	Power	0-100 km/h (0-62 mph)	Torque	Top speed	Energy consumption (EU-Norm combined)
CLA 200	10/2025 - present	165 kW rear-axle electric motor (RWD)	58 kWh	2-Speed automatic transmission	224 hp	7,5 s	335 Nm	210 km/h / 130 mph	12,3 kWh / 100 km (5.05 mi / kWh)
CLA 250+	06/2025 - present	200 kW rear-axle electric motor (RWD)	85 kWh	2-Speed automatic transmission	272 hp	6,7 s	335 Nm	210 km/h / 130 mph	12,5 kWh / 100 km (4.97 mi / kWh)
CLA 350 4MATIC	06/2025 - present	260 kW dual-motor layout (AWD)	85 kWh	2-Speed automatic transmission	354 hp	4,9 s	515 Nm	210 km/h / 130 mph	12,5 kWh / 100 km (4.97 mi / kWh)
CLA 45 AMG 4MATIC+	upcoming	500 kW Triple-motors layout (AWD)	94 kWh NMC	2-Speed automatic transmission	671 hp	2,7 s	1,759 Nm	250 - 270 km/h / 155 - 167 mph	

== Marketing ==
As part of the first generation CLA US product launch, a television commercial featuring Kate Upton was produced for, and premiered during the 4th quarter of Super Bowl XLVII. Additional commercials titled 'Dishes', 'Jukebox', 'Sundae' were premiered during Super Bowl XLVII. A TV commercial titled 'Soul', featuring a devil played by Willem Dafoe was also premiered during Super Bowl XLVII.

In a promotional campaign under the slogan "Untamed. The new CLA", a TV commercial titled 'Wolf' asks how it is possible to stand out from the crowd, when so many others are also striving for individuality – the answer is provided by the new CLA. The commercial was premiered until mid-March 2013 on all major German TV channels. The print materials show the 'style rebel' from a range of perspectives, which had appeared until mid-April 2013 in high-circulation news and business magazines, specialist motoring publications and special interest media under headings such as "Form: non-conformist" or "Untamed".

The #Untamed was launched in February 2013, a digital photo installation inspired by the new Mercedes-Benz CLA, for which Mercedes-Benz will be exploiting the power of the popular social media photo platform Instagram. Users could to go to www.untamed-installation.com and upload the most unusual images from their personal Instagram photo stream to the multi-device-compatible CLA campaign website. On the homepage, participants can see how individual their photos are, and the extent to which they stand out from the images captured by other participants. In accordance with the central theme of "The natural enemy of the ordinary", participants are encouraged to break free from the constraints of convention and demonstrate their creativity. A poster of the personal pictures can then be downloaded, sent by email or shared with friends via Facebook, Google+ and Twitter. Began in April 2013, these personal photos were digitally reworked and, together with the CLA, incorporated into an actual photo installation, to be presented to an international audience in Paris.

The AMG CLA 45 first made its video game appearance in the 2014 PlayStation 4 video game Driveclub.

== Reception ==
The CLA has been a controversial vehicle among Mercedes-Benz fans in North America due to its many differences from other Mercedes-Benz models. In contrast to most Mercedes models sold in the U.S., the CLA is small, based on a front-wheel drive platform, and powered exclusively by four-cylinder engines. Labeled by Mercedes-Benz as a new "gateway" into the Mercedes-Benz brand with sales "beyond our optimistic expectations", Consumer Reports rated the CLA as "140% worse than the average car" in the 2014 Annual Auto Reliability Survey.

Despite the criticism, the CLA received praise worldwide from professional reviewers. The price, which starts from $30,000, has been the highlight for many reviewers. The front-wheel drive has been praised for giving the CLA a better fuel economy, which gives especially the CLA 250 a 26 mpg in the city and 38 mpg on the road. The performance has also been praised, with 208 hp (155 kW), the CLA 250 accelerates from 0 to 60 mph (0 to 97 km/h) in 6.9 seconds. The coupe-like handling has been praised, which has been described as "quick and direct". The interior has been praised for making the CLA a more "youthful choice". Though the CLA is an entry-level car, professional reviewers agree that it still looks and feels like a proper Mercedes.

However, in 2025, What Car? experienced the Autonomous Emergency Braking (AEB) system on the CLA activating randomly once while Will Nightingale (Reviews Editor) was taking his daughters to school "two lanes merged into one so the car on the outside lane started to come into my lane at about 30 MPH leaving plenty of space and the CLA slammed on the brakes and tried to stop the car completely". Then the AEB activated randomly while Will was driving during a video shoot in Wales, and caused a collision while trying to get a tracking shot of the 3 cars on test with the videographer in the boot of the lead car with a harness on pulling in front “quite gently” of the 3 cars on test at “quite a safe gap” while the CLA was driving at 20 to 30 MPH a few moments later while the gap between the CLA and the lead car was increasing Autonomous Emergency Braking triggered a stop bringing the car to a complete standstil with the Tesla that was also on test activating its AEB systems but still going into the back of the CLA. In response to this, Mercedes says that after inspecting the car and downloading the data, the car “correctly detected a collision risk with a pedestrian in front of the car. This was a plausible explanation as the person in the preceding vehicle was observed sitting in the open trunk facing against the direction of travel.” However, this statement didn't address the incident when Will was taking his daughters to school and as noted by What Car? they have never had this happen before when getting tracking shots of cars.

Year	Europe	U.S.	Mexico	China		
Year	Europe	U.S.	Mexico	CLA	AMG	EV
2012	37					—
2013	27,598	14,113	725			—
2014	38,374	27,365	1,140			—
2015	62,100	29,643	1,728			—
2016	65,810	25,792	2,288			—
2017	64,086	20,669	2,554			—
2018	58,522	22,556	2,634			—
2019	61,958	12,400	1,913			—
2020	67,319	8,461	1,317			—
2021	55,956	6,822				—
2022						—
2023				3,523	1,324	—
2024				5,660	477	—
2025				3,883	951	1,412

== Awards ==
- 2026 : Car of the Year
