= Mercedes-Benz GLA =

Subcompact luxury crossover SUV

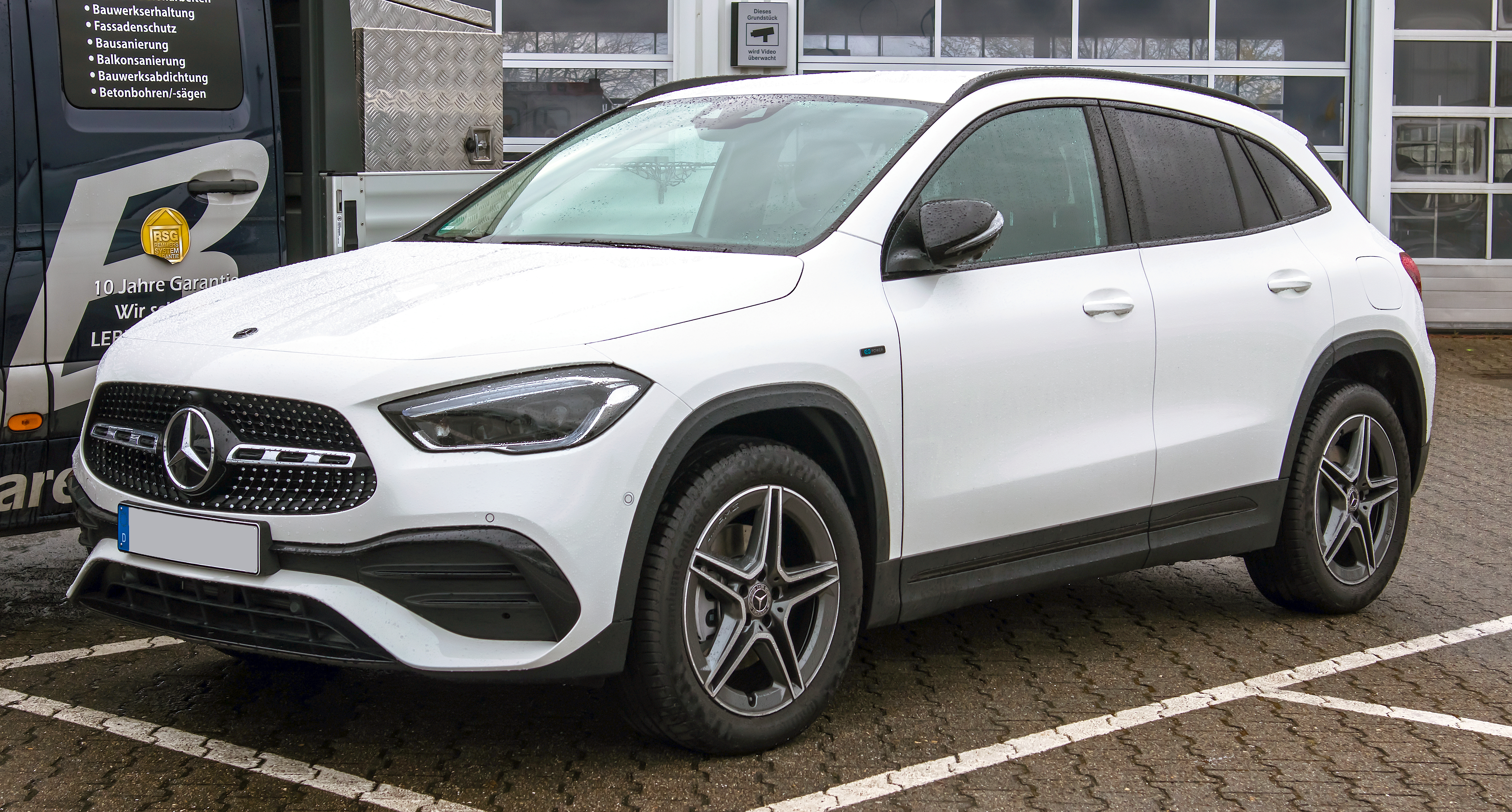
- Mercedes-Benz GLA 250 e AMG Line (H 247)

Overview
- Manufacturer: Daimler AG (2013–2022); Mercedes-Benz Group (2022–present)
- Production: 2013–present
- Model years: 2014–present

Body and chassis
- Class: Subcompact luxury crossover SUV (C)
- Body style: 5-door SUV
- Layout: Front-engine, front-wheel-drive; Front-engine, all-wheel-drive (4Matic)

The Mercedes-Benz GLA is a subcompact luxury crossover SUV manufactured and marketed by Mercedes-Benz over two generations. It is essentially the SUV equivalent of the A-Class, and the smallest SUV marketed by the brand. The production version was revealed in August 2013 ahead of the 2013 Frankfurt Auto Show in September 2013.

The GLA is powered by a range of petrol and diesel 4-cylinder engines, and comes in either front-wheel drive or all-wheel drive, the latter marketed by Mercedes as 4Matic.

The GLA nameplate aligns with Mercedes SUV nomenclature, where GL stands for Geländewagen (German for off-road vehicle) and the A designates its overall place in the Mercedes range, in this class, the smallest or A-Class.

== Concept models ==
=== Concept GLA (2013) ===
The Concept GLA debuted in the 2013 Auto Shanghai and is powered by a 2.0-litre turbo petrol engine rated 211 PS (155 kW; 208 hp), 7-speed dual clutch automatic transmission, driving all wheels via the Mercedes-Benz 4Matic system. The concept included front headlamps with a laser-beam projector, two cameras housed in the front roof rail, 20-inch wheels and fibre-optic ambient interior lighting.

=== Concept GLA 45 AMG (2013) ===
The Concept GLA 45 AMG concept car was unveiled at the 2013 Los Angeles Auto Show, as a high-performance version of the GLA with an AMG 2.0-litre four-cylinder twin-scroll turbocharged petrol engine rated 360 PS (265 kW; 355 hp) and 450 N⋅m (332 lbf⋅ft), 4Matic all wheel drive, AMG Speedshift DCT 7-speed transmission with paddle shifters, and fitted with various AMG-badged accoutrements and an AMG sports exhaust system with an electronically controlled variable vane system to modulate the exhaust note.

=== Concept GLA 45 AMG (2016) ===
The 2016 Concept GLA 45 AMG with an AMG 2.0-litre four-cylinder twin-scroll turbocharged petrol engine rated 381 PS; 375 hp (280 kW) and 475 N⋅m (350 lbf⋅ft), 4Matic all wheel drive, AMG Speedshift DCT 7-speed transmission with paddle shifters, and fitted with various AMG-badged accoutrements and an AMG sports exhaust system with an electronically controlled variable vane system to modulate the exhaust note.

== First generation (X156; 2013) ==
First generation
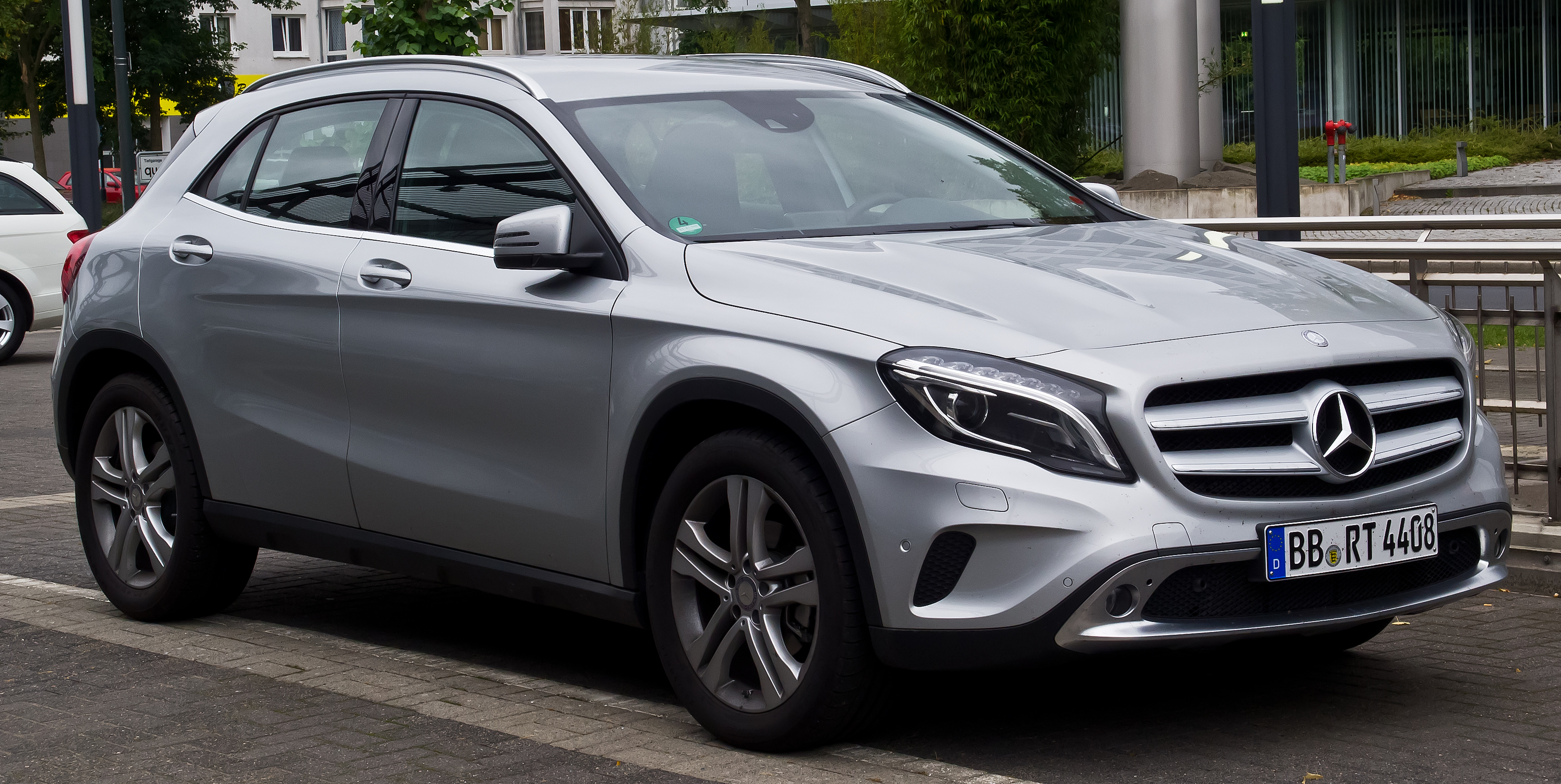
- 2014 Mercedes-Benz GLA 200 CDI Urban

Overview
- Model code: X156
- Production: December 2013 – November 2019
- Model years: 2014–2020
- Assembly: Germany: Rastatt (Mercedes Benz Werk Rastatt); China: Beijing (Beijing Benz); India: Pune; Thailand: Samut Prakan (TAAP); Brazil: Iracemápolis (Mercedes-Benz Iracemápolis)
- Designer: Robert Lešnik, Michael Frei, Mark Fetherston

Body and chassis
- Platform: MFA
- Related: Mercedes-Benz A-Class (W176); Mercedes-Benz CLA (C117); Mercedes-Benz B-Class (W246); Infiniti Q30; Infiniti QX30

Powertrain
- Engine: Petrol: 1.6 L M270 turbo I4; 2.0 L M270 turbo I4; 2.0 L M133 turbo I4; Diesel: 1.5 L OM607 turbo I4; 2.1 L OM651 turbo I4
- Transmission: 6-speed manual; 7-speed DCT

Dimensions
- Wheelbase: 2,699 mm (106.3 in)
- Length: 4,417 mm (173.9 in)
- Width: 1,804 mm (71.0 in)
- Height: 1,494 mm (58.8 in)
- Curb weight: 1,505–1,585 kg (3,318–3,494 lb)

The production X156 GLA is closely based on the Concept GLA design and was unveiled at the 2013 Frankfurt Motor Show. Orders had been taken beginning from the end of November 2013, and arrived in dealer showrooms during 2014, with Japan and US in the autumn.

At launch, Mercedes-Benz claimed the vehicle was the most aerodynamic in its segment, with a Cd figure of 0.29. The GLA's platform makes use of a strut-type front suspension and a multi-link rear setup, and an electric power steering.

Nissan marketed a restyled variant of the GLA from 2016 to 2019 through its Infiniti brand in North America as the Infiniti Q30 and QX30, sharing the GLA mechanicals with revised exterior sheet metal. The Infiniti derivatives were produced between 2016 and 2019.

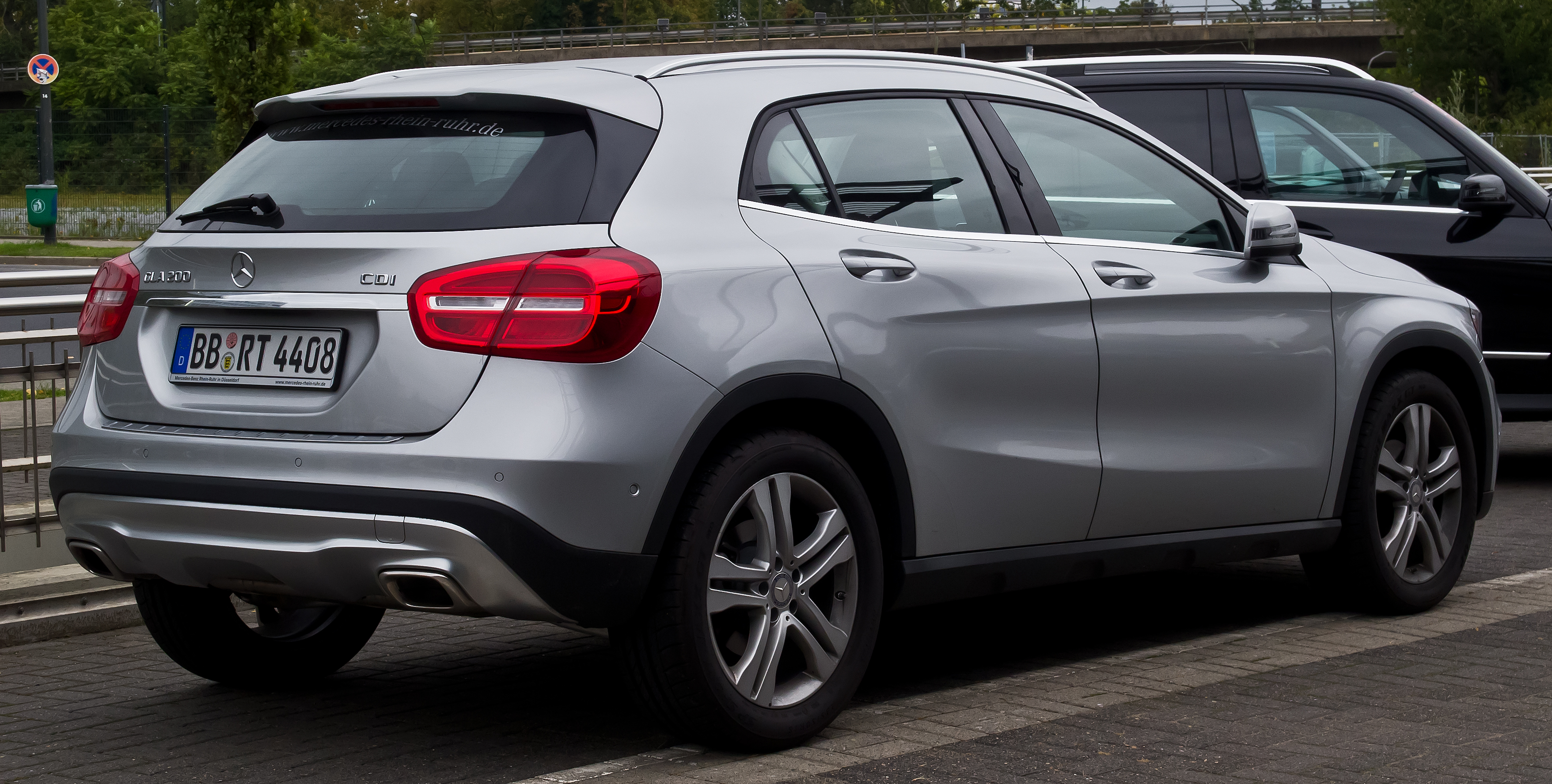
2014 Mercedes-Benz GLA 200 CDI Urban (pre-facelift)

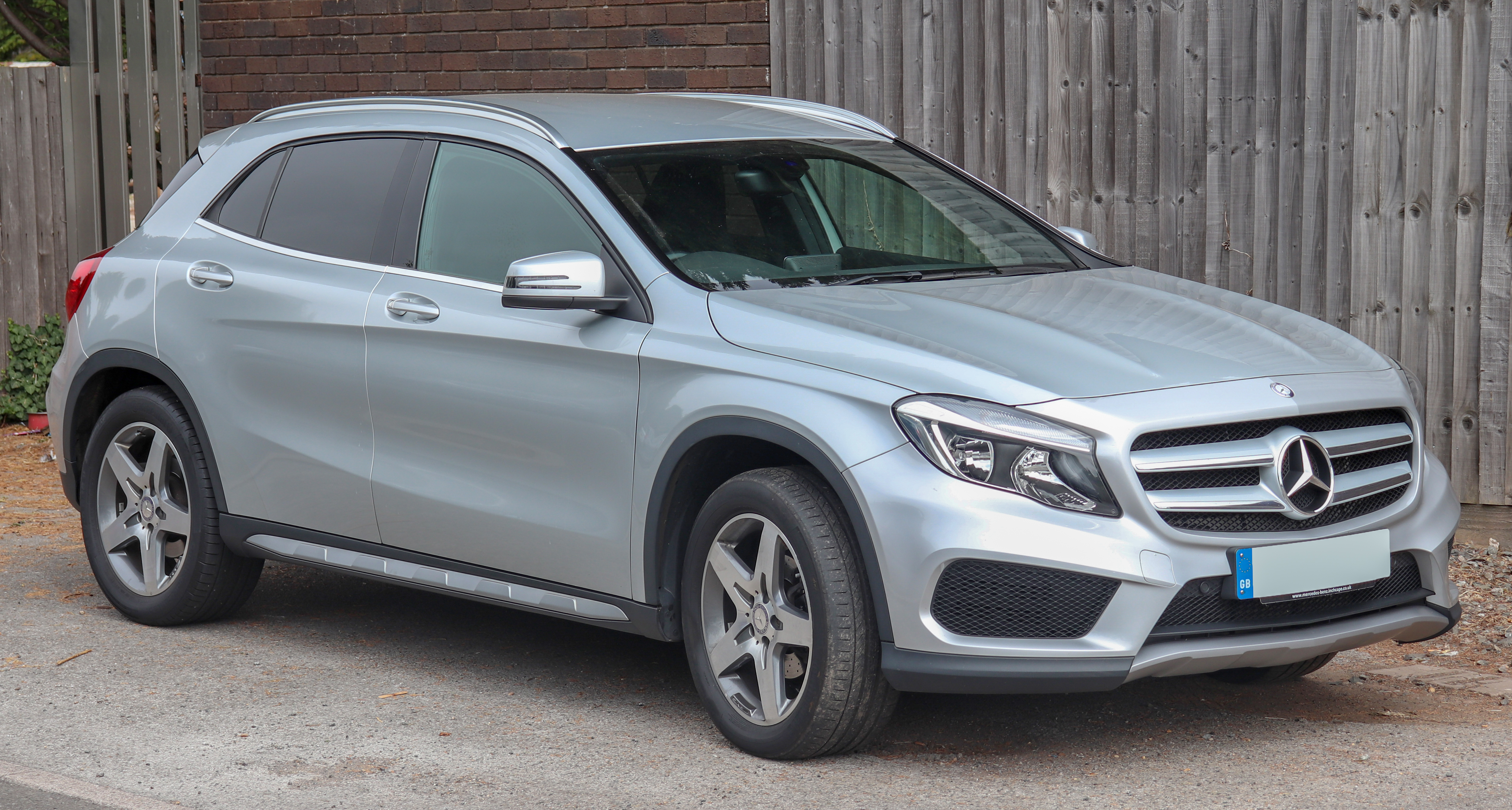
2015 Mercedes-Benz GLA 200 (pre-facelift)

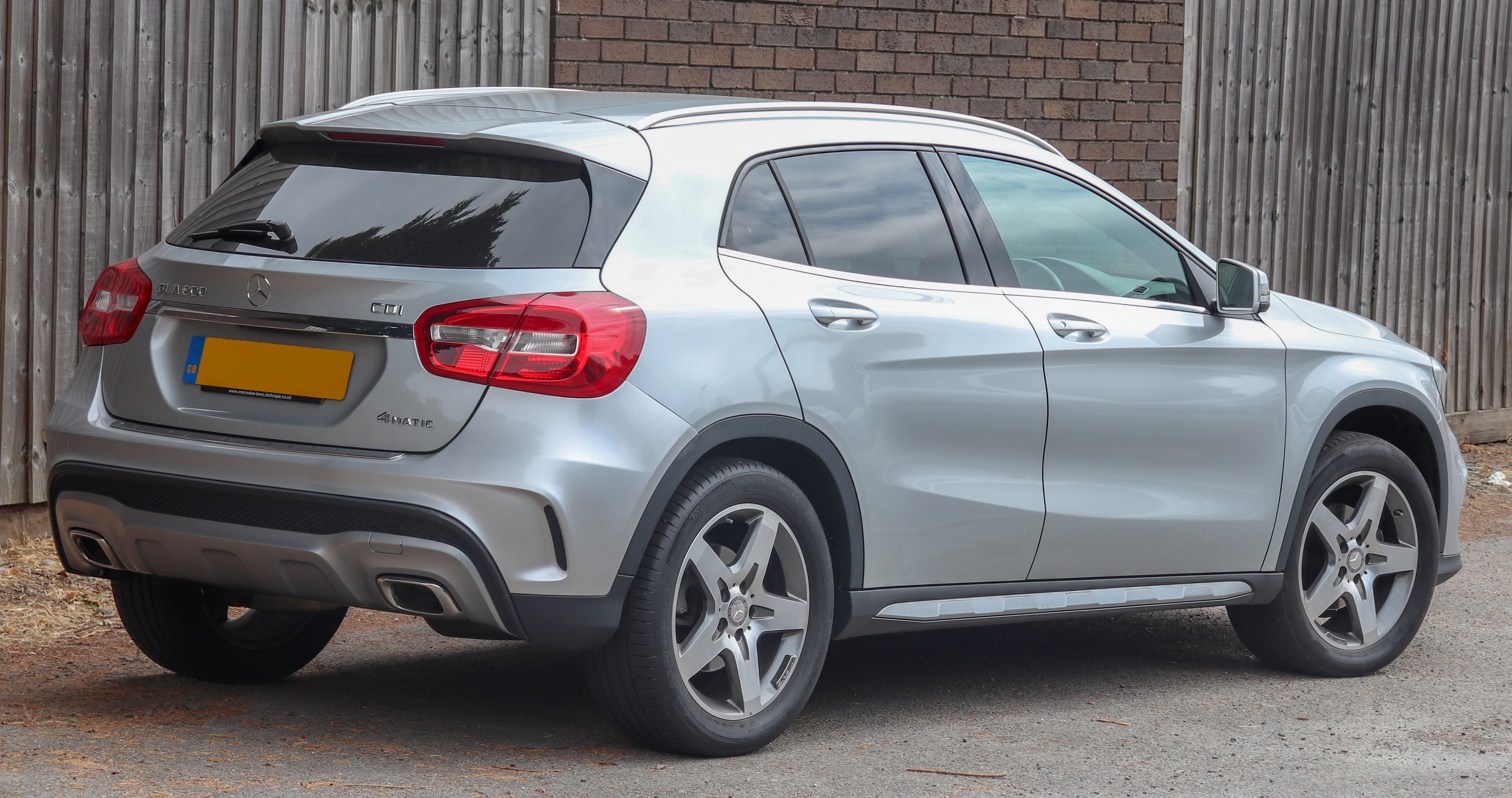
2015 Mercedes-Benz GLA 200 (pre-facelift)

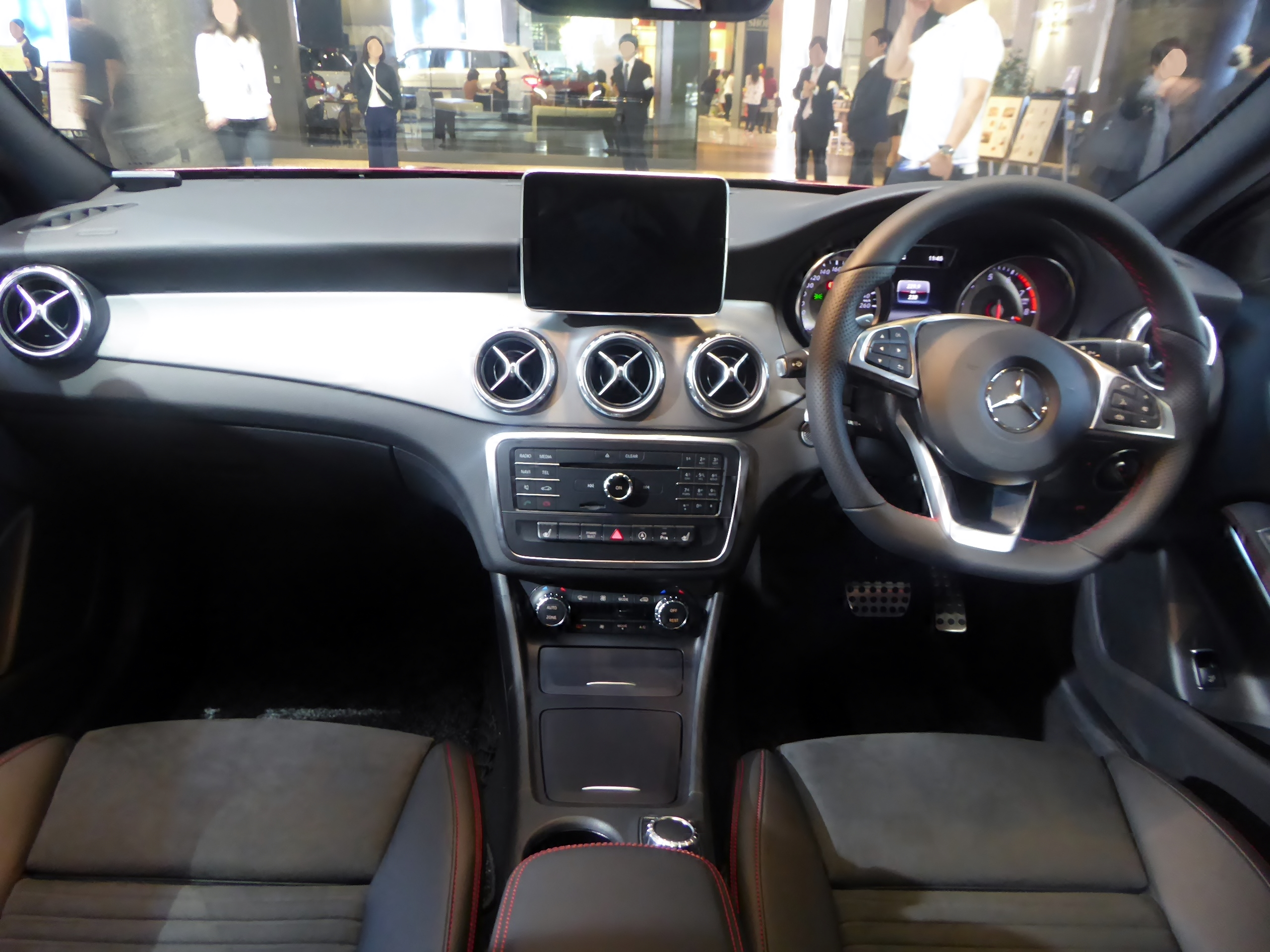
Interior

=== Facelift ===
Mercedes unveiled a mid-life facelift of the GLA at the Detroit Motor Show in January 2017. The updated model came with some cosmetic tweaks on the outside, including a redesigned grille, new front and rear bumpers and updated 18-inch alloy wheels. Moreover, the bi-xenon headlamps of the previous models were replaced by all LED units, while the taillights too were all LED and got a new design pattern. A new Canyon Beige colour option was also added. The interiors carried forward the same dashboard layout, though the infotainment system received a new 8.0-inch screen that was located on top of the centre console in a free-standing layout.

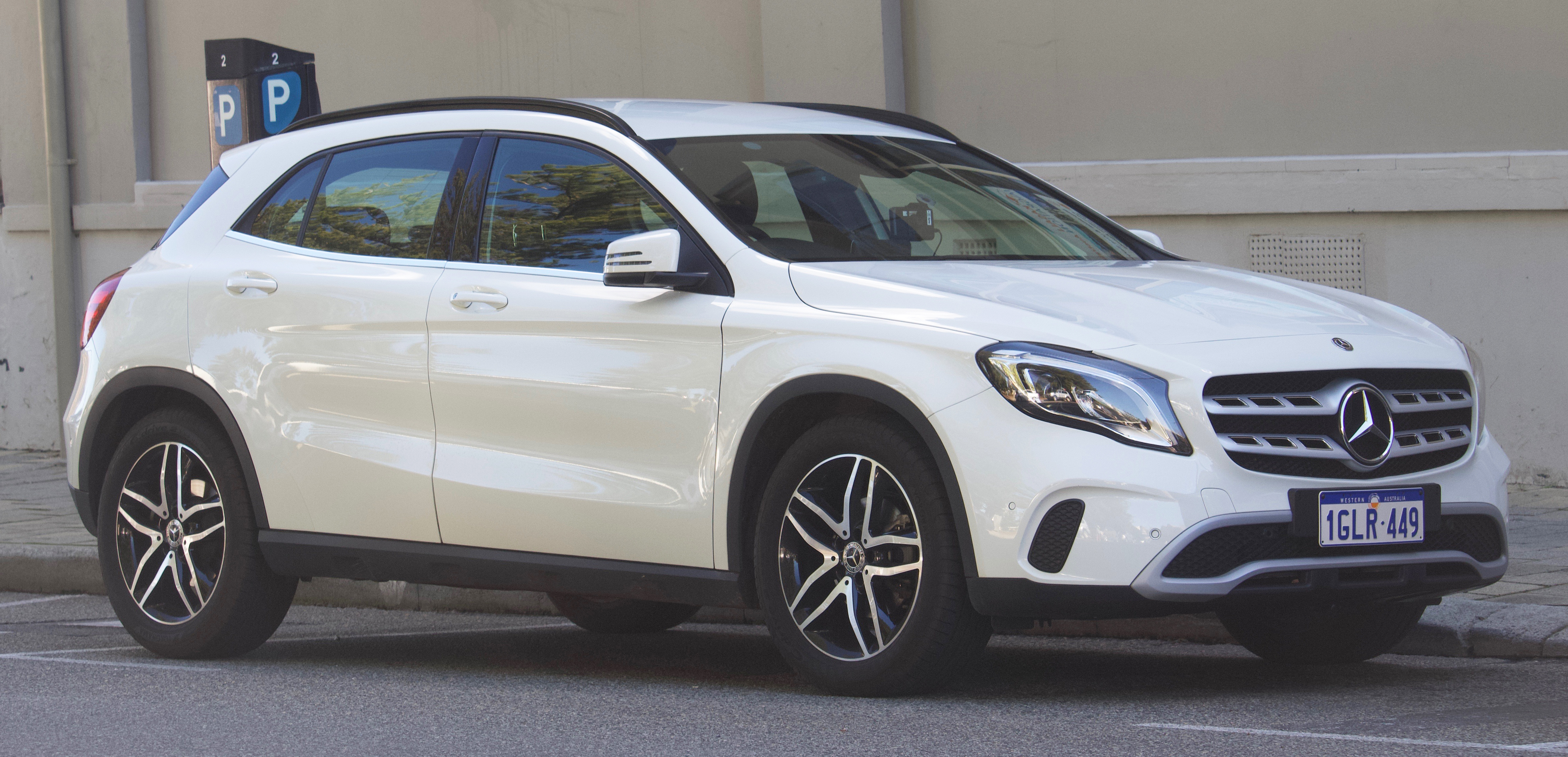
2018 Mercedes-Benz GLA 180 (facelift)

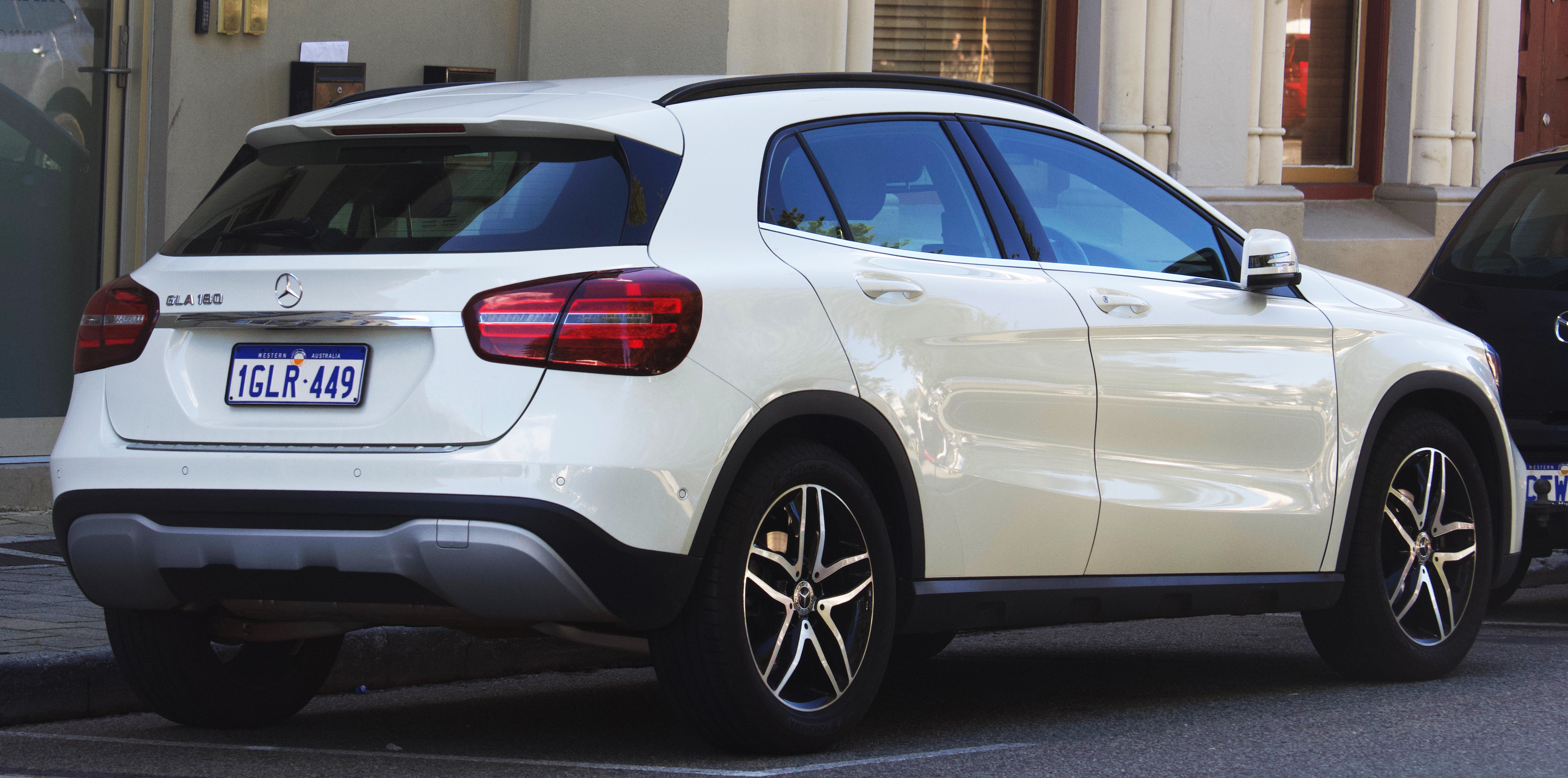
2018 Mercedes-Benz GLA 180 (facelift)

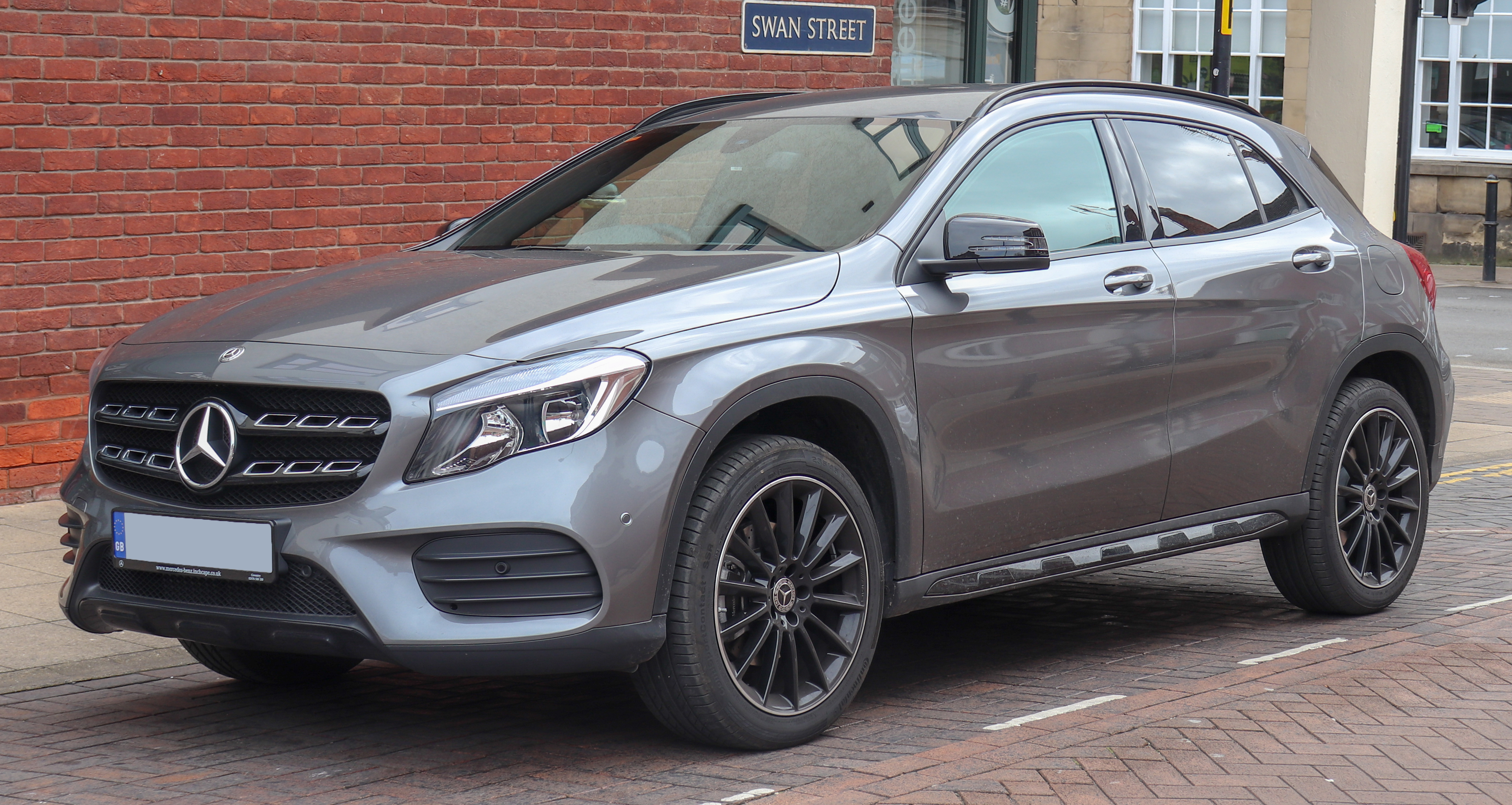
2018 Mercedes-Benz GLA 220 (facelift)

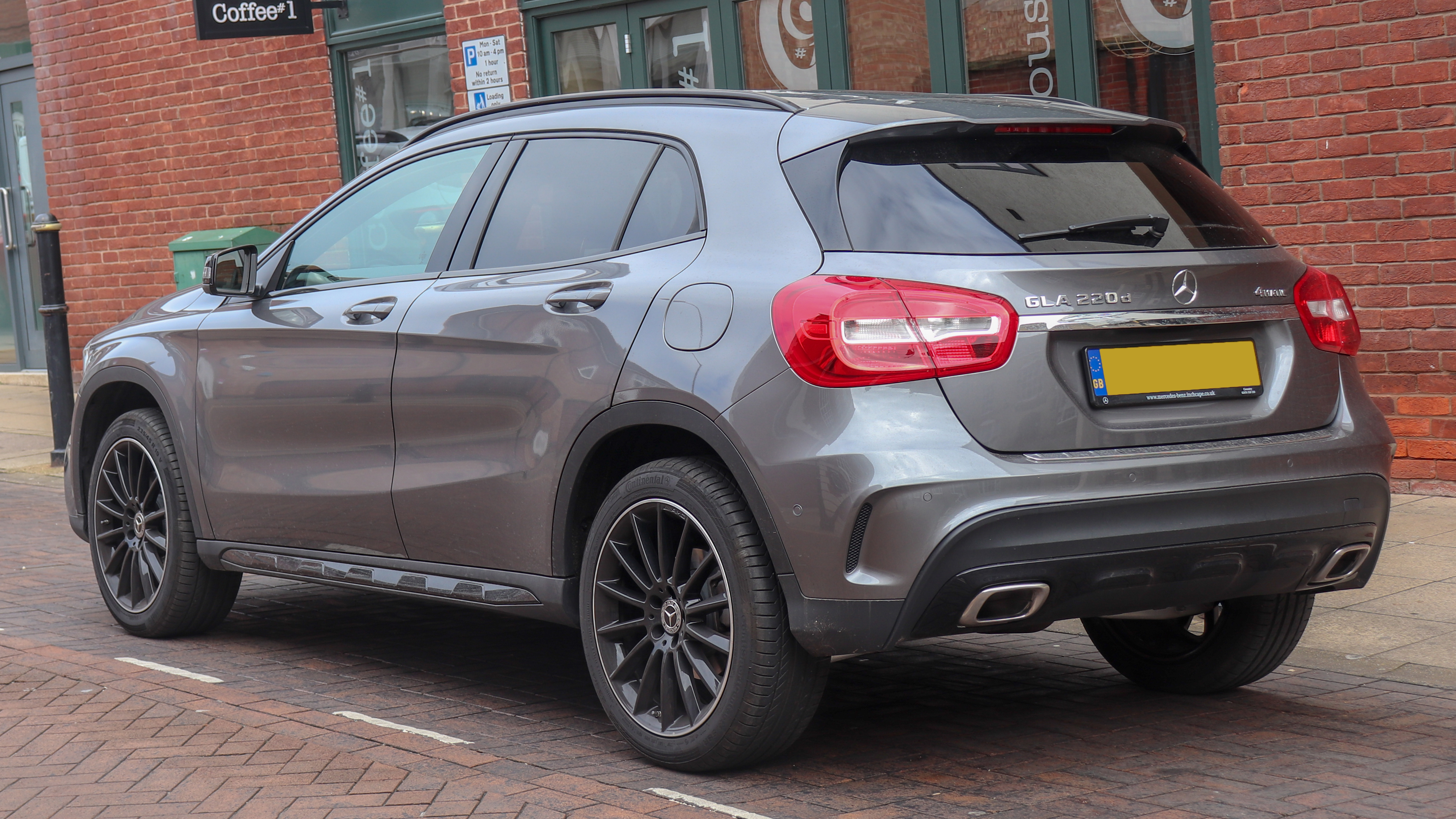
2018 Mercedes-Benz GLA 220 (facelift)

=== GLA 45 AMG ===
The design of GLA 45 AMG is based on Concept GLA 45 AMG, with AMG sports suspension (MacPherson strut front axle with stiffer steering knuckles, four-link rear axle, optimised elastokinematics, specially tuned spring/damper units, bigger anti-roll bars), electromechanical AMG speed-sensitive sports steering, AMG high-performance braking system (ventilated, cross-drilled brake discs with grey- or red-painted brake calipers), 3-stage ESP with "SPORT Handling" mode, ESP Curve Dynamic Assist, 5-twin-spoke AMG light-alloy wheels painted titanium grey with high-sheen finish and 235/45 R19 tyres (optional 10-spoke AMG light-alloy wheels in 2 a choice of 2 colours (titanium grey with high-sheen finish, matt black with high-sheen rim flange) 235/40 R 20 tyres), AMG front apron with front splitter in matt titanium grey, AMG 'twin blade' radiator grille in matt titanium grey, black flics (air deflector elements) above the large exterior cooling air intakes, bi-xenon headlamps, side sill panels with titanium grey inserts, 'TURBO AMG' lettering on the front wings and the aluminium roof rails, rear diffuser insert with titanium grey trim, rectangular chrome-plated tailpipe trim at the twin tailpipes.

Some launch models of the AMG are sold as "Edition 1", available for one year from market launch, and include a high-gloss black Aerodynamics package with larger front splitter, additional flics in the front apron, and rear aerofoil. The vehicle was unveiled at the 2014 North American International Auto Show with sales from the summer of 2014.

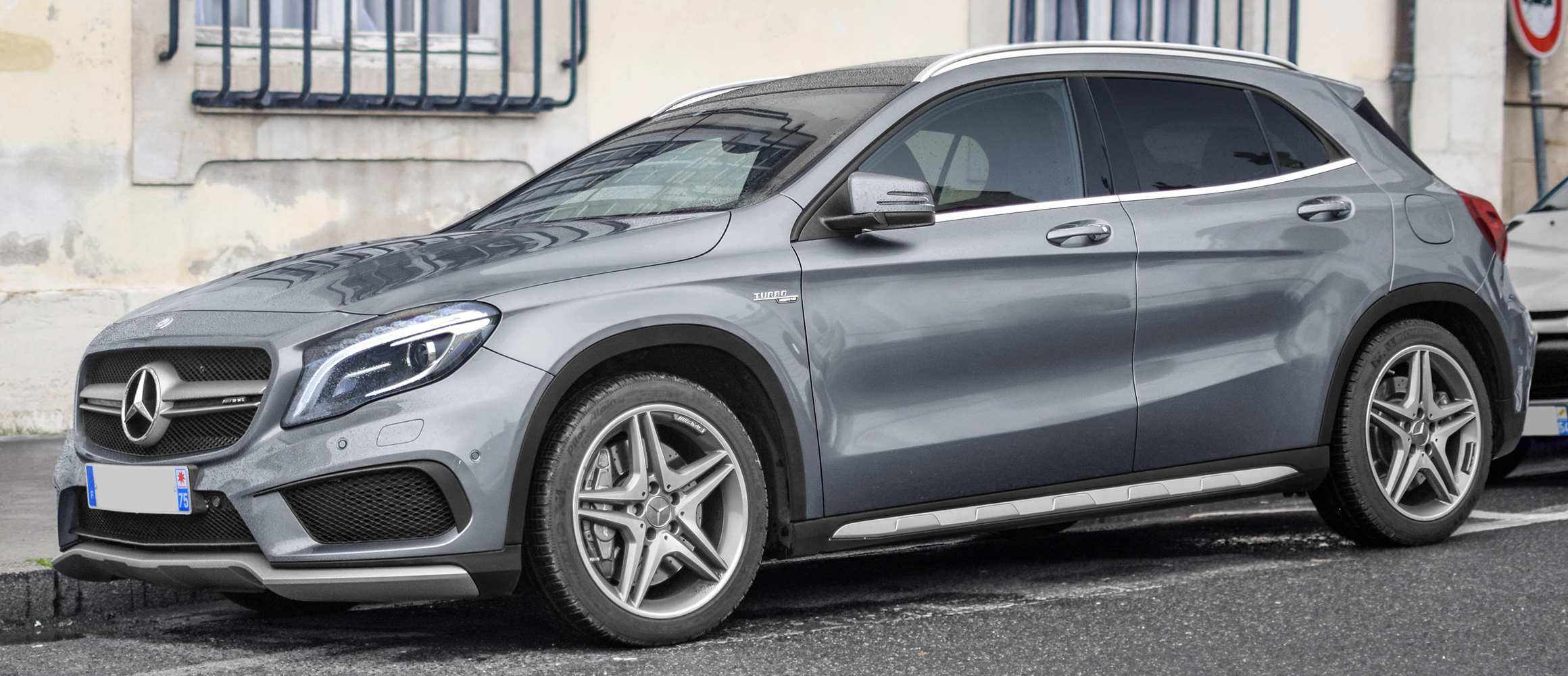
Mercedes-Benz GLA 45 AMG 4MATIC

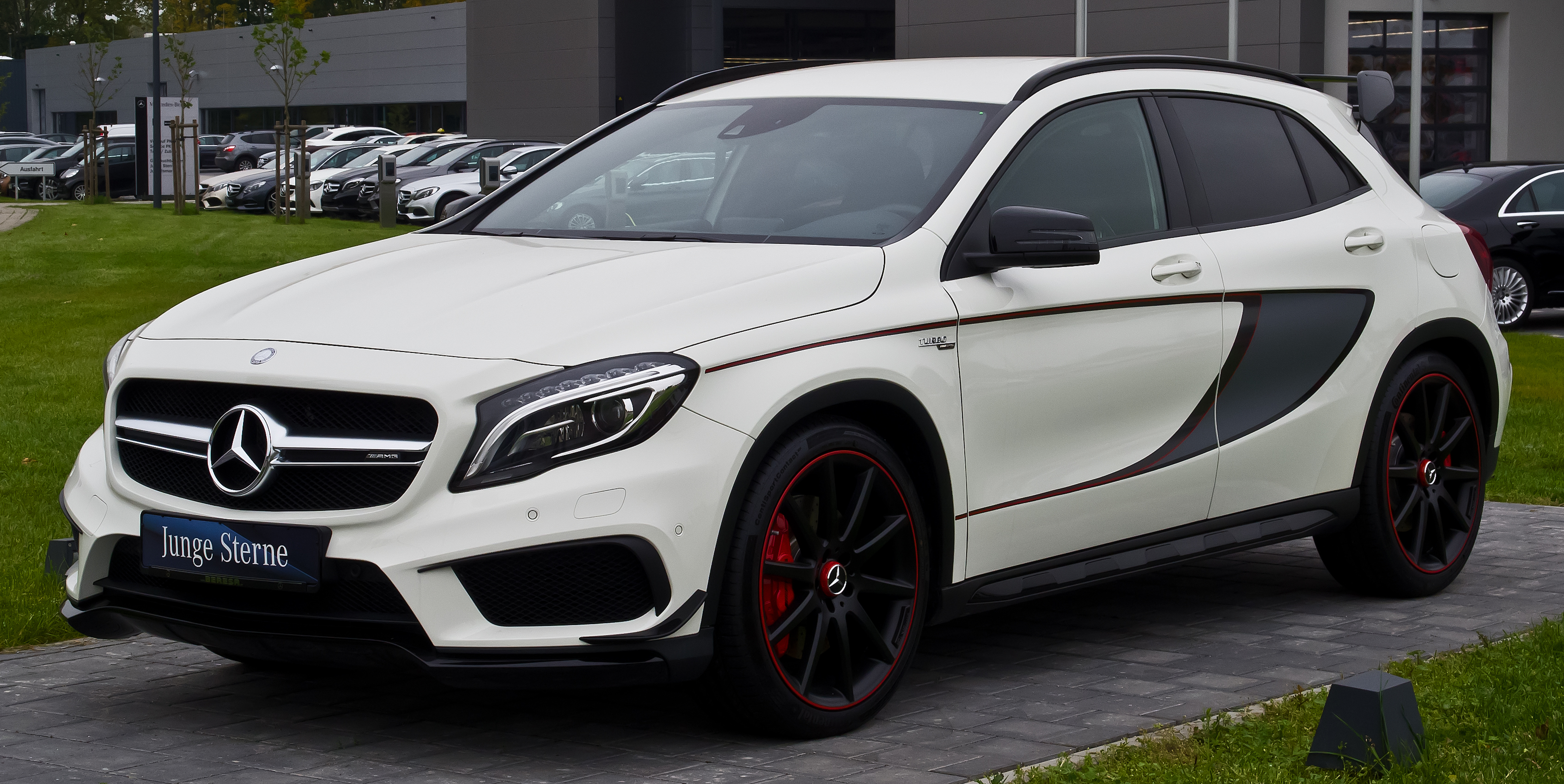
2015 Mercedes-Benz GLA 45 AMG 4MATIC Edition 1

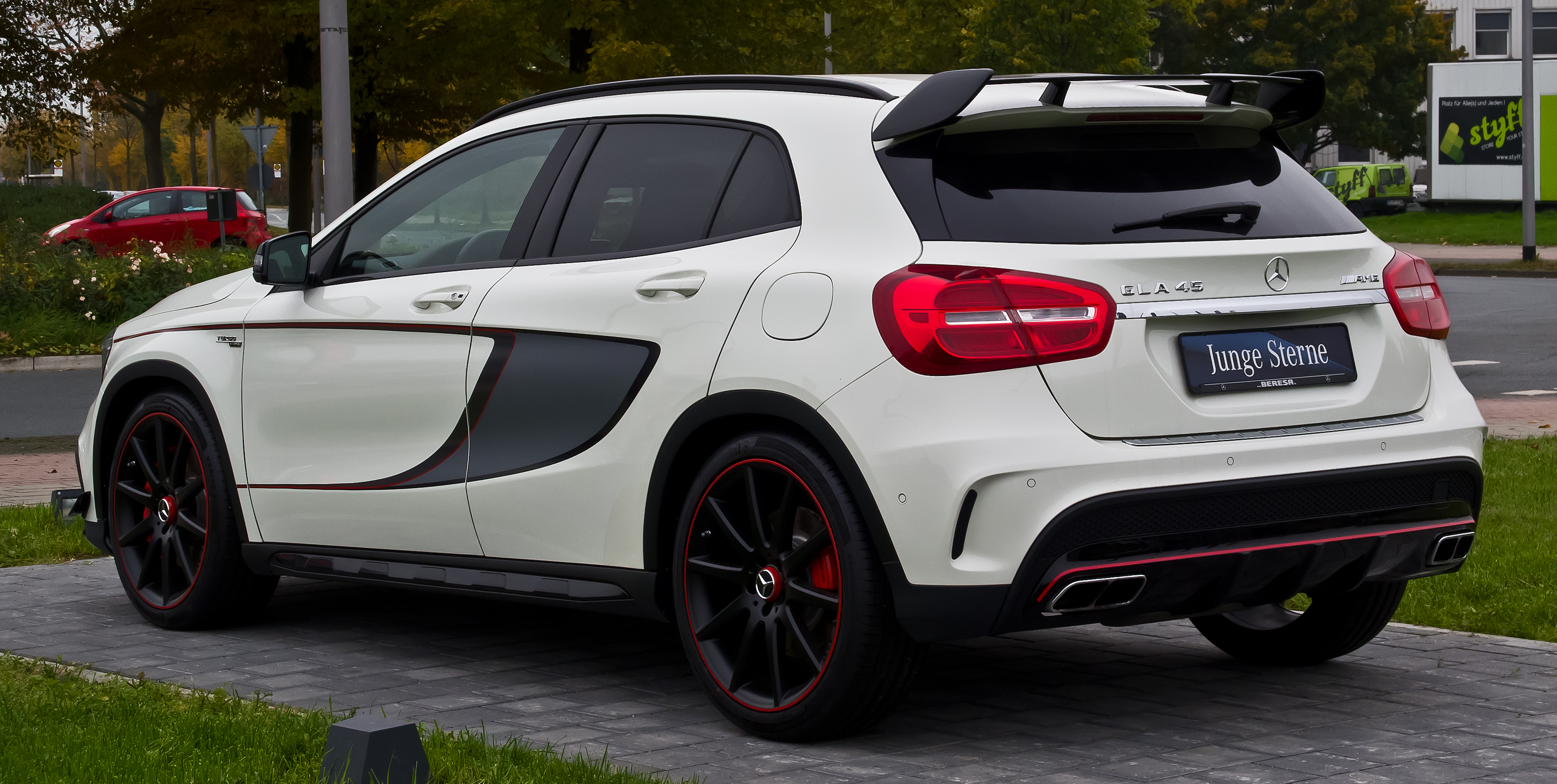
2015 Mercedes-Benz GLA 45 AMG 4MATIC Edition 1

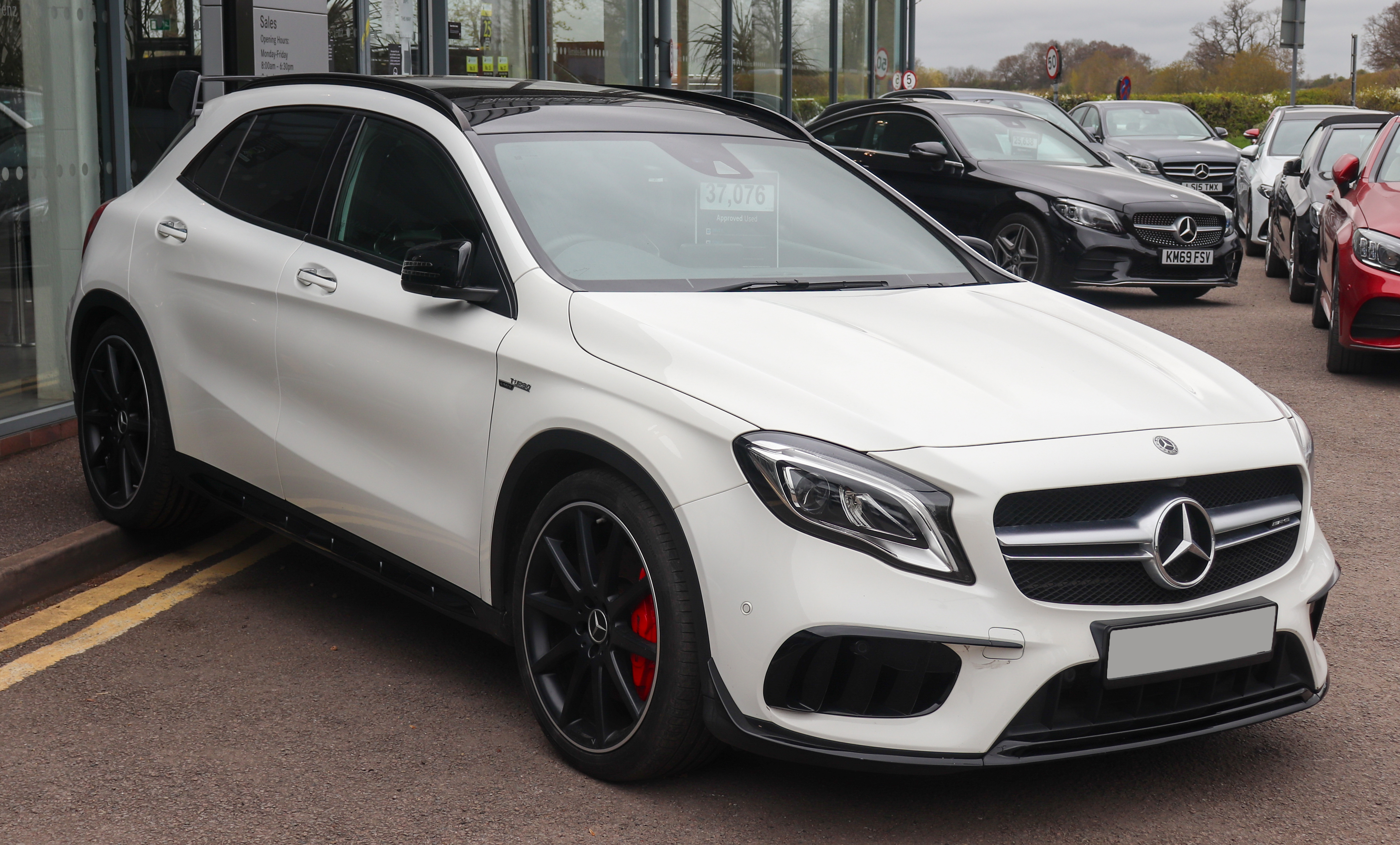
2019 Mercedes-AMG GLA 45 facelift

=== Technical details ===
The GLA shares its platform with the A-Class and B-Class, with a similar range of petrol and diesel engines. Availability of engines varies between markets.

==== Engines ====
Model	Years	Configuration	Displacement	Power	Torque	0–100 km/h (0–62 mph)	Top speed	Fuel consumption/efficiency (EU-Norm combined)
Petrol engines
GLA 180	02/2015–11/2019	Inline-4 turbo (M 270 DE 16 AL red.)	1.6 L (1,595 cc)	90 kW (122 PS; 121 bhp) at 5,000 rpm	200 N⋅m (148 lb⋅ft) at 1,250-4,000 rpm	9.3 seconds (M); 9.2 seconds (A)	200 km/h (124 mph) (M)(A)	5.7–6.0 L/100 km (41–39 mpg_{‑US}) (M); 5.5–5.7 L/100 km (43–41 mpg_{‑US}) (A)
GLA 200	12/2013–11/2019	Inline-4 turbo (M 270 DE 16 AL)	1.6 L (1,595 cc)	115 kW (156 PS; 154 bhp) at 5,300 rpm	250 N⋅m (184 lb⋅ft) at 1,250-4,000 rpm	8.9 seconds (M); 8.8 seconds (A)	215 km/h (134 mph) (M)(A)	5.8–5.9 L/100 km (41–40 mpg_{‑US}) (M)(A)
GLA 220 4MATIC	01/2017–11/2019	Inline-4 turbo (M 270 DE 20 AL)	2.0 L (1,991 cc)	135 kW (184 PS; 181 bhp) at 5,500 rpm	300 N⋅m (221 lb⋅ft) at 1,200-4,000 rpm	7.1 seconds	230 km/h (143 mph)	6.5–6.6 L/100 km (36–36 mpg_{‑US})
GLA 250	12/2013–11/2019	Inline-4 turbo (M 270 DE 20 AL)	2.0 L (1,991 cc)	155 kW (211 PS; 208 bhp) at 5,500 rpm	350 N⋅m (258 lb⋅ft) at 1,200-4,000 rpm	6.7 seconds (M)(A)	230 km/h (143 mph) (M)(A)	6.0–6.1 L/100 km (39–39 mpg_{‑US}) (M)(A)
GLA 250 4MATIC	12/2013–11/2019	Inline-4 turbo (M 270 DE 20 AL)	2.0 L (1,991 cc)	155 kW (211 PS; 208 bhp) at 5,500 rpm	350 N⋅m (258 lb⋅ft) at 1,200-4,000 rpm	6.6 seconds	230 km/h (143 mph)	6.5–6.6 L/100 km (36–36 mpg_{‑US})
GLA 45 4MATIC AMG	07/2014–08/2015	Inline-4 twin-scroll turbo (M 133 DE 20 AL)	2.0 L (1,991 cc)	265 kW (360 PS; 355 bhp) at 6,000 rpm	450 N⋅m (332 lb⋅ft) at 2,250-5,000 rpm	4.8 seconds	250 km/h (155 mph)	7.5 L/100 km (31 mpg_{‑US})
Mercedes-AMG GLA 45 4MATIC	09/2015–04/2019	Inline-4 twin-scroll turbo (M 133 DE 20 AL)	2.0 L (1,991 cc)	280 kW (381 PS; 375 bhp) at 6,000 rpm	475 N⋅m (350 lb⋅ft) at 2,250-5,000 rpm	4.4 seconds	250 km/h (155 mph); 270 km/h (168 mph) with AMG Driver's Package	7.4 L/100 km (32 mpg_{‑US})
Diesel engines ("d" designation replaced "CDI" from January 2017 onward)
GLA 180 d (CDI)	09/2014–05/2018	Inline-4 turbo (OM 607 DE 15 LA)	1.5 L (1,461 cc)	80 kW (109 PS; 107 bhp) at 5,000 rpm	250 N⋅m (184 lb⋅ft) at 1,750–2,500 rpm	12.0 seconds (M); 11.9 seconds (A)	190 km/h (118 mph) (M)(A)	4.0 L/100 km (59 mpg_{‑US}) (M); 3.9 L/100 km (60 mpg_{‑US}) (A)
GLA 200 d (CDI)	12/2013–04/2019	Inline-4 turbo (OM 651 DE 22 LA)	2.1 L (2,143 cc)	100 kW (136 PS; 134 bhp) at 3,400–4,400 rpm	300 N⋅m (221 lb⋅ft) at 1,400–3,000 rpm	10.0 seconds (M); 9.9 seconds (A)	205 km/h (127 mph) (M)(A)	4.3–4.5 L/100 km (55–52 mpg_{‑US}) (M); 4.4–4.5 L/100 km (53–52 mpg_{‑US}) (A)
GLA 200 d (CDI) 4MATIC	12/2013–04/2019	Inline-4 turbo (OM 651 DE 22 LA)	2.1 L (2,143 cc)	100 kW (136 PS; 134 bhp) at 3,400–4,400 rpm	300 N⋅m (221 lb⋅ft) at 1,400–3,000 rpm	9.9 seconds	200 km/h (124 mph)	4.9–5.1 L/100 km (48–46 mpg_{‑US})
GLA 220 d (CDI)	12/2013–04/2019	Inline-4 turbo (OM 651 DE 22 LA)	2.1 L (2,143 cc)	125 kW (170 PS; 168 bhp) at 3,400–4,400 rpm	340 N⋅m (251 lb⋅ft) at 1,400–3,000 rpm	8.3 seconds	215 km/h (134 mph)	4.4–4.6 L/100 km (53–51 mpg_{‑US})
GLA 220 d (CDI) 4MATIC	12/2013–04/2019	Inline-4 turbo (OM 651 DE 22 LA)	2.1 L (2,143 cc)	125 kW (170 PS; 168 bhp) at 3,400–4,400 rpm	340 N⋅m (251 lb⋅ft) at 1,400–3,000 rpm	8.3 seconds	215 km/h (134 mph)	4.9–5.1 L/100 km (48–46 mpg_{‑US})

==== Transmissions ====
Model	Years	Types (standard)	Types (optional)
Petrol engines
GLA 180	02/2015–11/2019	6-speed manual	7-speed 7G-DCT dual-clutch automatic
GLA 200	12/2013–11/2019	6-speed manual	7-speed 7G-DCT dual-clutch automatic
GLA 220 4MATIC	01/2017–11/2019	7-speed 7G-DCT dual-clutch automatic	–
GLA 250	12/2013–11/2019	6-speed manual	7-speed 7G-DCT dual-clutch automatic
GLA 250 4MATIC	12/2013–11/2019	7-speed 7G-DCT dual-clutch automatic	–
GLA 45 4MATIC AMG	07/2014–08/2015	7-speed AMG SPEEDSHIFT DCT dual-clutch automatic	–
Mercedes-AMG GLA 45 4MATIC	09/2015–04/2019	7-speed AMG SPEEDSHIFT DCT dual-clutch automatic	–
Diesel engines
GLA 180 d	09/2014–05/2018	6-speed manual	7-speed 7G-DCT dual-clutch automatic
GLA 200 d	12/2013–04/2019	6-speed manual	7-speed 7G-DCT dual-clutch automatic
GLA 200 d 4MATIC	12/2013–04/2019	7-speed 7G-DCT dual-clutch automatic	–
GLA 220 d	12/2013–04/2019	7-speed 7G-DCT dual-clutch automatic	–
GLA 220 d 4MATIC	12/2013–04/2019	7-speed 7G-DCT dual-clutch automatic	–

=== Safety ===
Euro NCAP test results* Mercedes-Benz GLA200 CDI 'Urban' 4x2 (LHD) (2014)
Test	Points	%
Overall:	5 /5 stars	
Adult occupant:	36.7	96%
Child occupant:	43.1	88%
Pedestrian:	24.4	67%
Safety assist:	9.1	70%

=== Marketing ===
As part of a partnership between Mercedes-Benz and Nintendo, the two companies released a television commercial featuring Mario driving a Mercedes-Benz GLA in the Japanese market in May 2014 to coincide with the line's Japanese launch. Additional commercials featuring other Mario characters in the same style were released in November 2014, culminating in the GLA becoming a selectable vehicle in Mario Kart 8 and its Switch port with Mercedes' W 25 Silver Arrow and 300 SL Roadster also being included.

== Second generation (H247; 2019) ==
Second generation
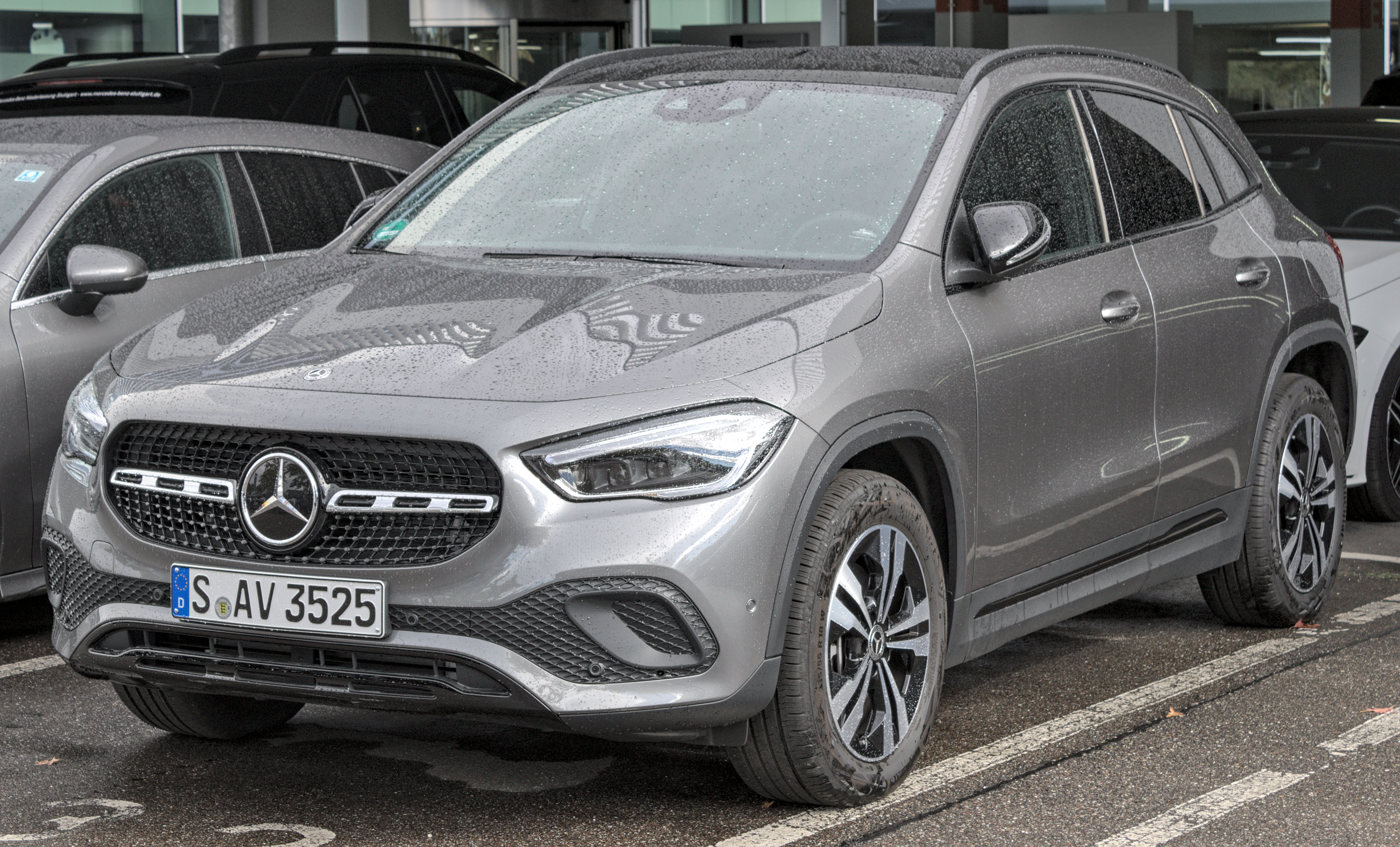

Overview
- Model code: H247
- Also called: Mercedes-Benz EQA (electric version)
- Production: December 2019 – present
- Model years: 2020–present
- Assembly: Germany: Rastatt; China: Beijing (Beijing Benz); India: Pune (MBI); Thailand: Samut Prakan (TAAP); Malaysia: Pekan (HICOM); Indonesia: Bogor (MBI / Inchcape Indomobil)
- Designer: Balázs Filczer, Gabriel Nemeth

Body and chassis
- Platform: MFA2
- Related: Mercedes-Benz EQA; Mercedes-Benz A-Class (W/V/Z177); Mercedes-Benz CLA (C/X118); Mercedes-Benz B-Class (W247); Mercedes-Benz GLB (X247)

Powertrain
- Engine: Petrol: 1.3 L M282 turbo I4; 2.0 L M260 turbo I4; 2.0 L M139 turbo I4; Petrol plug-in hybrid: 1.3 L M282 turbo I4; Diesel: 2.0 L OM654 turbo I4
- Transmission: 7-speed DCT automatic; 8-speed DCT automatic
- Hybrid drivetrain: Plug-in hybrid (GLA 250 e)

Dimensions
- Wheelbase: 2,729 mm (107.4 in)
- Length: 4,410 mm (173.6 in)
- Width: 1,834 mm (72.2 in)
- Height: 1,611 mm (63.4 in)
- Curb weight: 1,505–1,585 kg (3,318–3,494 lb)

The second generation, introduced on 11 December 2019 at Mercedes media event, is revised from the previous generation. The chassis number, 247, is shared with W247 B-Class and X247 GLB. The GLA uses the second generation MFA2 platform and completes the eight-model W177 A-Class compact based line-up.

The H247 GLA is 15 mm (0.59 in) shorter in length, 10 mm (0.39 in) narrower, 104 mm (4.1 in) higher than the first-generation model, and the wheelbase has been extended by 30 mm (1.2 in). The H247 GLA has 116 mm more headroom, 45 mm more elbow room and 43 mm more rear shoulder room. The ground clearance has been raised by 9 mm to 143 mm and the front seats are positioned 140 mm higher than in the W177 A-Class. Despite this, there is an added 22 mm (0.87 in) of front-seat headroom compared to its predecessor.

As with other MFA2-based models, the GLA has suspension with MacPherson struts up front and either a torsion beam or multi-link suspension at the rear. Variable damping control is optional. Inside, the GLA is similar to other MFA2 Mercedes models, featuring a dashboard with a free-standing digital display panel, the MBUX infotainment system, as well as other tech such as a colour Heads-Up Display.

A battery electric version called the EQA was introduced in 2020 as the third battery electric SUV from Mercedes-Benz.

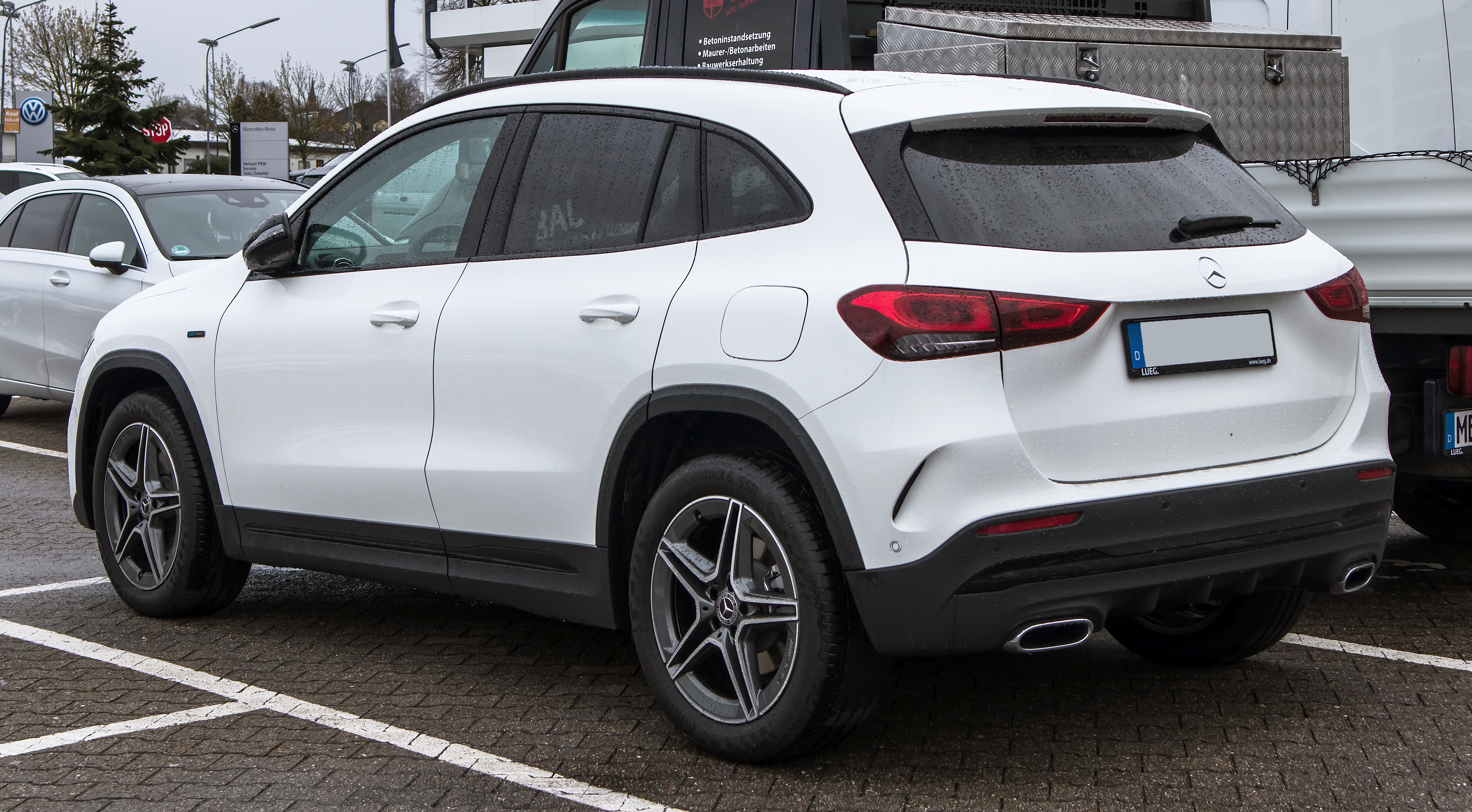
Rear view (AMG Line)

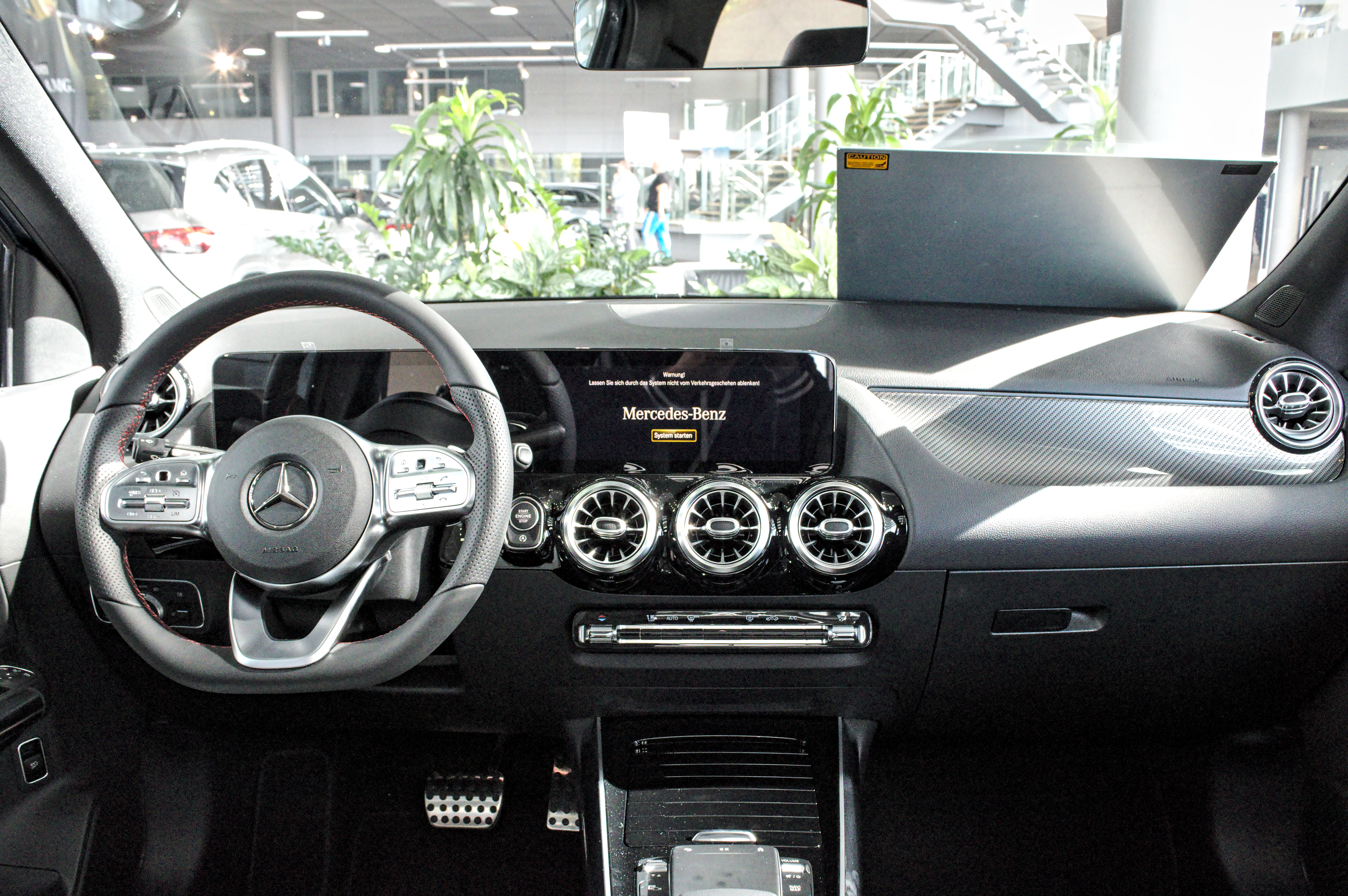
Interior

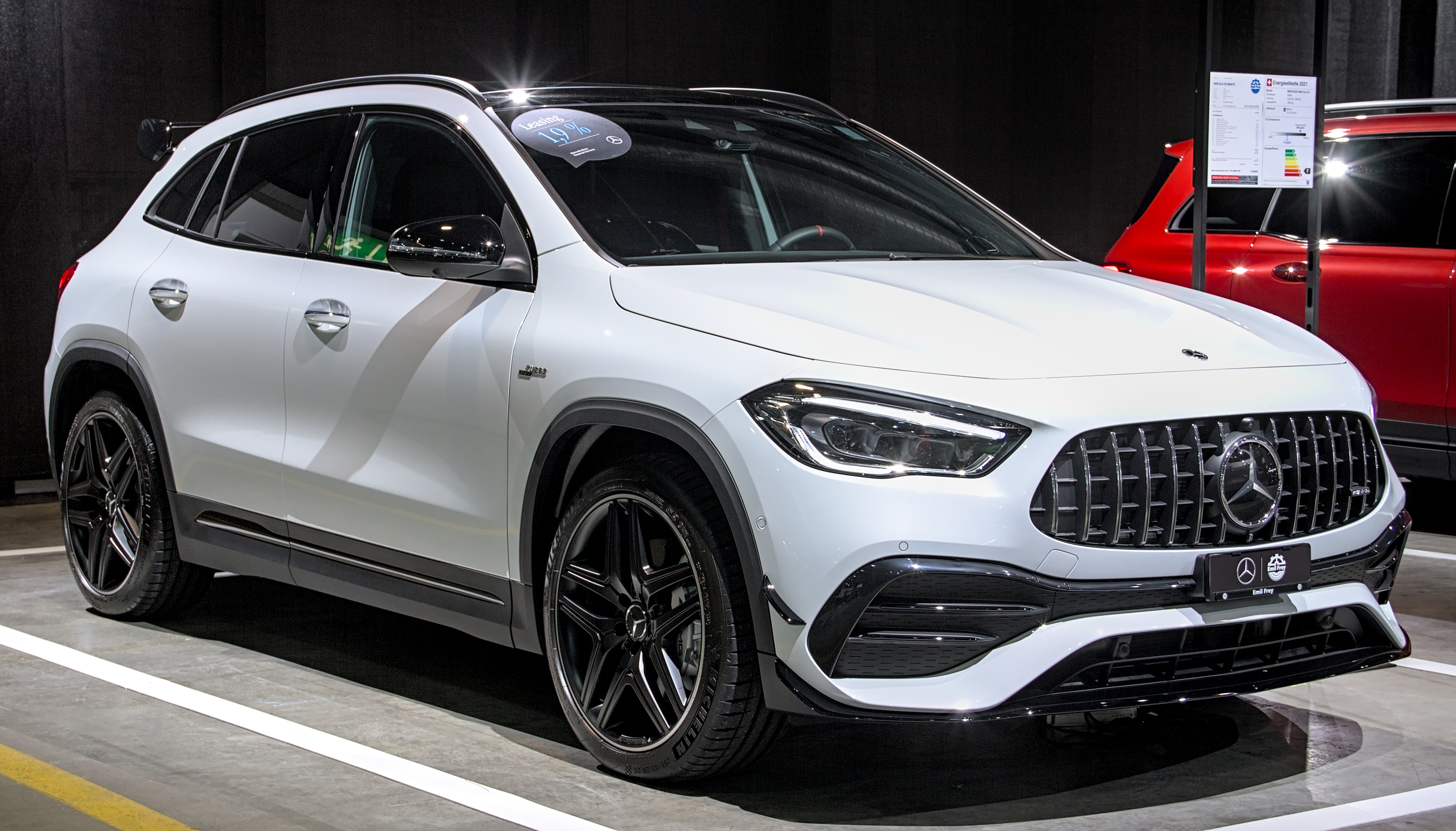
Mercedes-AMG GLA 35 4Matic

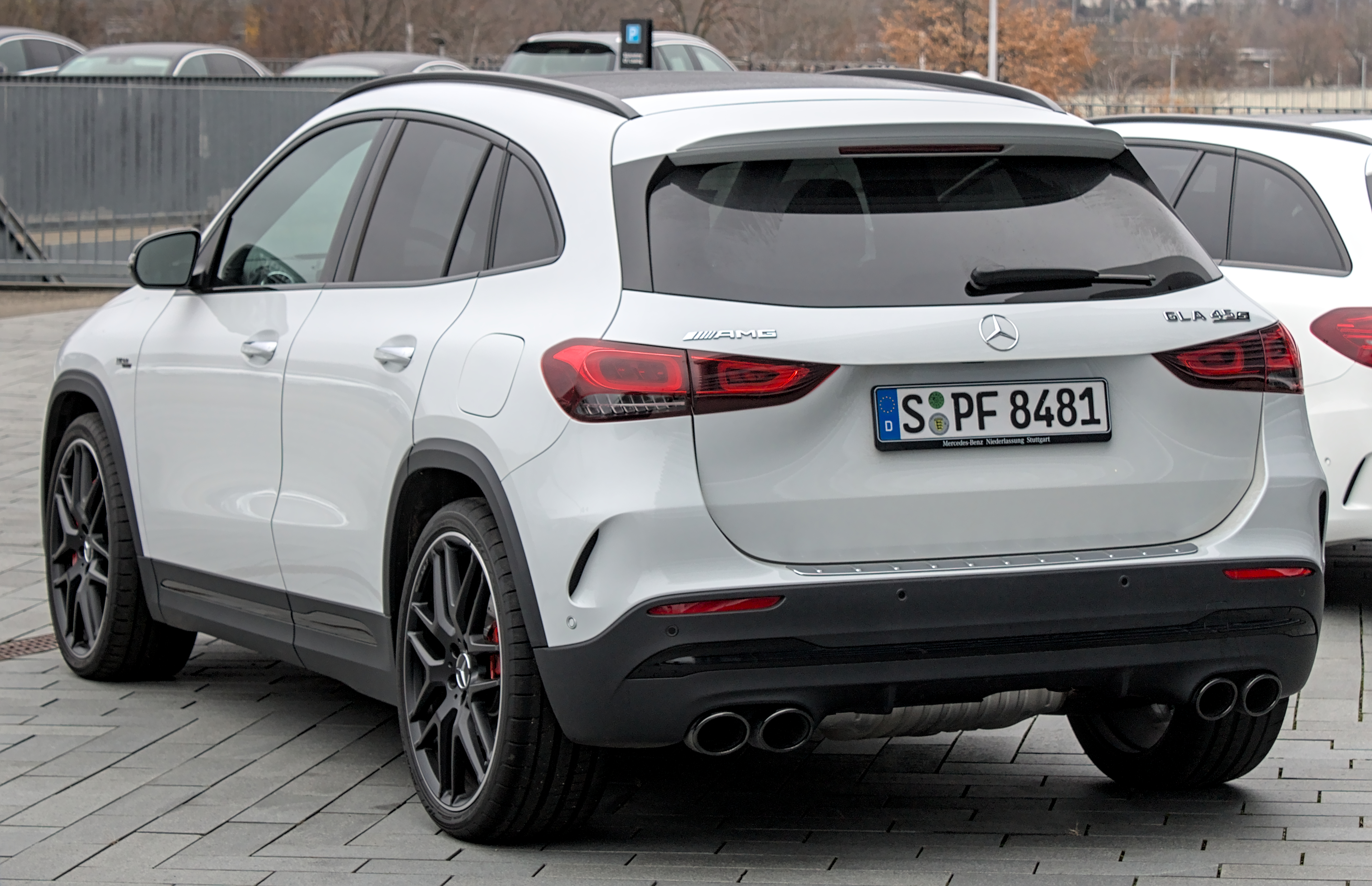
Mercedes-AMG GLA 45 S 4Matic+

=== 2023 facelift ===
In March 2023, the GLA received a facelift, featuring redesigned headlights and taillights. It receives the latest iteration of Mercedes's MBUX infotainment system, which supports wireless Apple CarPlay and Android Auto. It receives updated powertrain options, along with three new optional wheel designs. A dual 10.3-inch screen that originally came part of the Premium Package became standard.

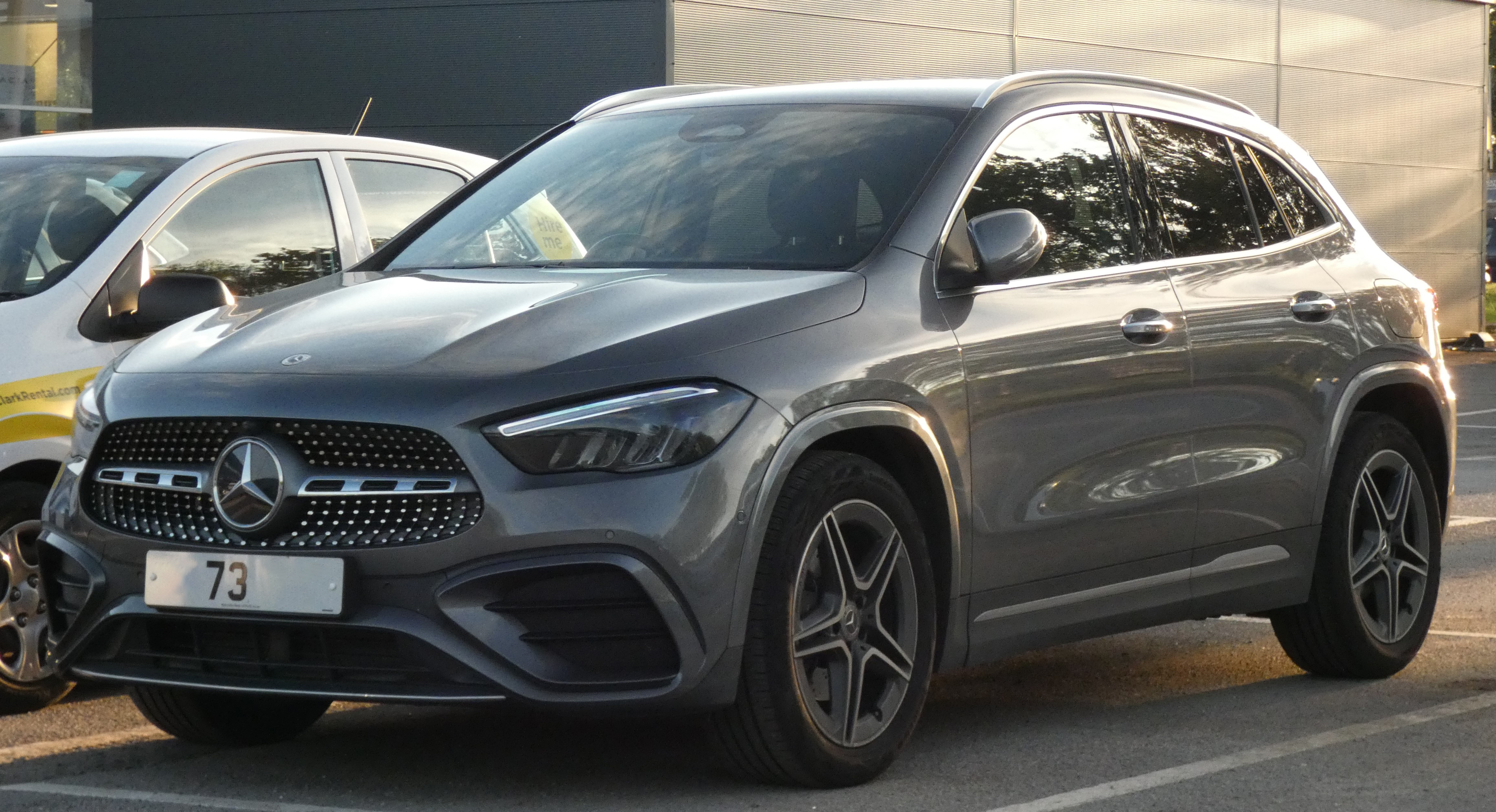
Mercedes-Benz GLA 200d AMG Line (UK)

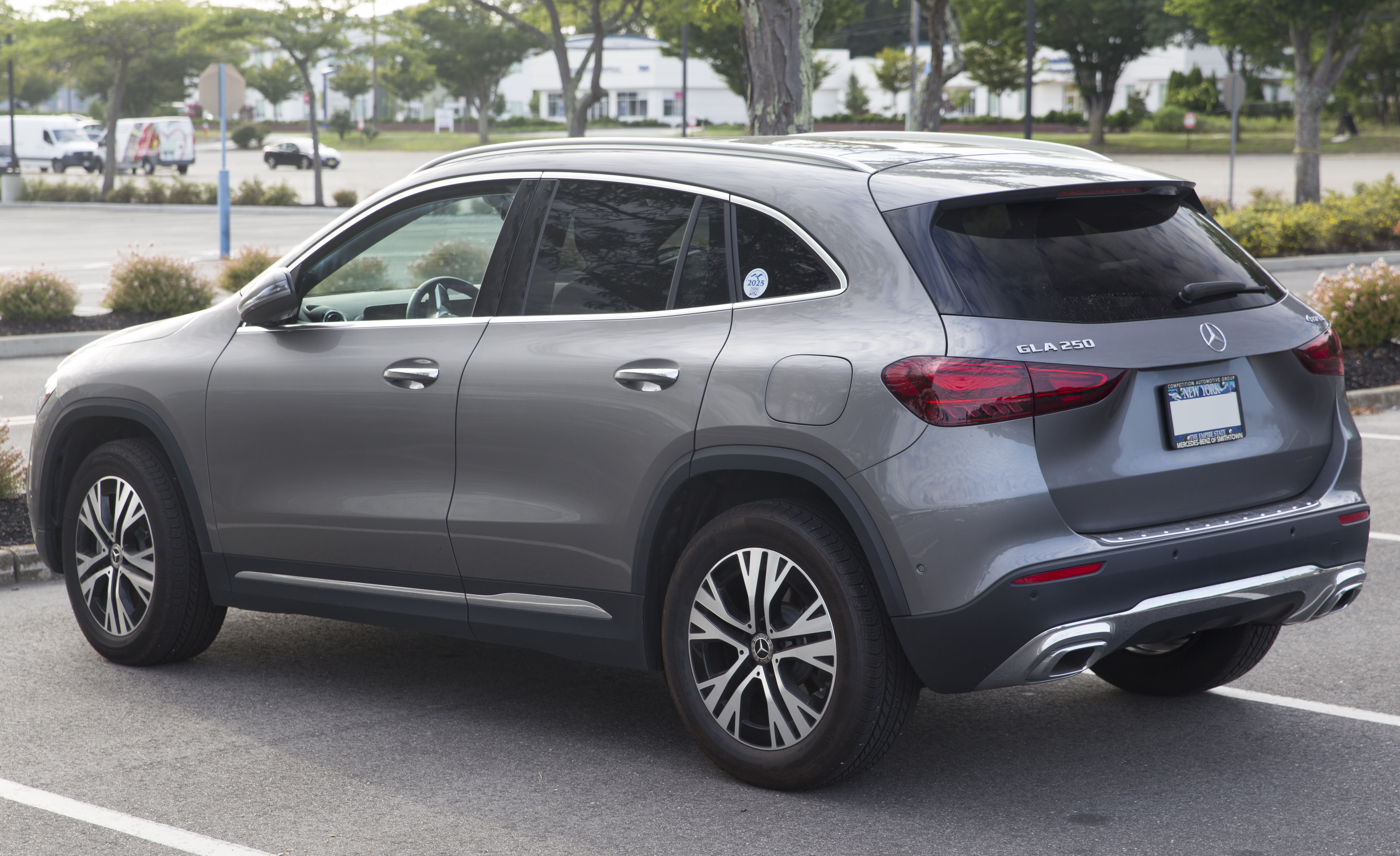
Mercedes-Benz GLA 250 (US; rear view)

=== Technical details ===
==== Powertrain ====
The second generation GLA has four petrol and four diesel models at launch. The GLA 250 e plug-in hybrid model was revealed in March 2020. The model range for the United States is GLA 250, GLA 4MATIC, and Mercedes-AMG GLA 35 4MATIC.

Model	Years	Configuration	Displacement	Power	Torque	0–100 km/h (0–62 mph)	Top Speed	Fuel Consumption/Efficiency (EU-Norm combined)
Petrol Engines
GLA 180	2020–	Turbo inline-4 M 282 DE 14 AL	1.3 L (1,332 cc)	100 kW (136 PS; 134 bhp) at 5,500 rpm	200 N⋅m (148 lb⋅ft) at 1,460 rpm	9.6 seconds	200 km/h (124 mph)	6.7 L/100 km (35 mpg_{‑US})
GLA 200	2020–	Turbo inline-4 M 282 DE 14 AL	1.3 L (1,332 cc)	120 kW (163 PS; 161 bhp) at 5,500 rpm	250 N⋅m (184 lb⋅ft) at 1,620–4,000 rpm	8.7 seconds	210 km/h (130 mph)	5.6–5.9 L/100 km (42–40 mpg_{‑US})
GLA 200 4MATIC	2020–	Turbo inline-4 M 282 DE 14 AL	1.3 L (1,332 cc)	120 kW (163 PS; 161 bhp) at 5,500 rpm	250 N⋅m (184 lb⋅ft) at 1,620 rpm	9.3 seconds	206 km/h (128 mph)	6.8 L/100 km (35 mpg_{‑US})
GLA 250	2020–	Turbo I4; M 260 DE 20 AL	2.0 L (1,991 cc)	165 kW (224 PS; 221 bhp) at 5,500 rpm	350 N⋅m (258 lb⋅ft) at 1,800–4,000 rpm	6.9 seconds	240 km/h (149 mph)	7.2–7.4 L/100 km (33–32 mpg_{‑US})
GLA 250 4MATIC	2020–	Turbo I4; M 260 DE 20 AL	2.0 L (1,991 cc)	165 kW (224 PS; 221 bhp) at 5,500 rpm	350 N⋅m (258 lb⋅ft) at 1,800–4,000 rpm	6.7 seconds	240 km/h (149 mph)	7.2–7.4 L/100 km (33–32 mpg_{‑US})
Mercedes-AMG GLA 35 4MATIC	2020–	Turbo I4; M 260 DE 20 AL	2.0 L (1,991 cc)	228 kW (310 PS; 306 bhp) at 5,500 rpm	400 N⋅m (295 lb⋅ft) at 1,800–4,000 rpm	5.1 seconds	250 km/h (155 mph)	7.2–7.4 L/100 km (33–32 mpg_{‑US})
Mercedes-AMG GLA 45 4MATIC+	2020–2024	Turbo I4; M 139	2.0 L (1,991 cc)	285 kW (387 PS; 382 bhp) at 5,500 rpm	480 N⋅m (354 lb⋅ft) at 1,800–4,000 rpm	4.4 seconds	250 km/h (155 mph)	7.2–7.4 L/100 km (33–32 mpg_{‑US})
Mercedes-AMG GLA 45 S 4MATIC+	2020–2024	Turbo I4; M 139	2.0 L (1,991 cc)	310 kW (421 PS; 416 bhp) at 5,500 rpm	500 N⋅m (369 lb⋅ft) at 1,800–4,000 rpm	4.3 seconds	250 km/h (155 mph)	7.2–7.4 L/100 km (33–32 mpg_{‑US})
Plug-In Hybrid Engines
GLA 250 e	03/2020–	Turbo inline-4 M282 DE14 LA	1.3 L (1,332 cc)	Engine: 116 kW (158 PS; 156 bhp); Electric: 75 kW (102 PS; 101 bhp)	Engine: 250 N⋅m (184 lb⋅ft); Electric: 300 N⋅m (221 lb⋅ft)	6.6 seconds	235 km/h (146 mph)	1.4–1.5 L/100 km (170–160 mpg_{‑US})
Diesel Engines
GLA 180 d	2020–	Turbo inline-4 OM 654q DE 20 SCR	2.0 L (1,951 cc)	85 kW (116 PS; 114 bhp) at 3,400–4,400 rpm	280 N⋅m (207 lb⋅ft) at 1,200–2,600 rpm	10.8-11.0 seconds	190 km/h (118 mph)	4.6–5.8 L/100 km (51–41 mpg_{‑US})
GLA 200 d	2020–	Turbo inline-4 OM 654q DE 20	2.0 L (1,951 cc)	110 kW (150 PS; 148 bhp) at 3,400 – 4,440 rpm	320 N⋅m (236 lb⋅ft) at 1,400 - 2,600 rpm	9.0 seconds	204 km/h (127 mph)	4.9–5.0 L/100 km (48–47 mpg_{‑US})
GLA 200 d 4MATIC	2020–	Turbo inline-4 OM 654q DE 20	2.0 L (1,951 cc)	110 kW (150 PS; 148 bhp) at 3,400 – 4,440 rpm	320 N⋅m (236 lb⋅ft) at 1,400 - 2,600 rpm	9.3 seconds	201 km/h (125 mph)	5.2–5.5 L/100 km (45–43 mpg_{‑US})
GLA 220 d 4MATIC	2020–	Turbo inline-4 OM 654q DE 20	2.0 L (1,951 cc)	140 kW (190 PS; 188 bhp) at 3,800 rpm	400 N⋅m (295 lb⋅ft) at 1,600 - 2,400 rpm	7.6 seconds	217 km/h (135 mph)	5.2–5.5 L/100 km (45–43 mpg_{‑US})

==== Transmissions ====
Only GLA 180 and 200 uses 7-speed 7G-DCT automatic transmission while the rest of engine range uses 8-speed 8G-DCT automatic transmission. The GLA 35 4MATIC AMG uses 8-speed AMG Speedshift automatic transmission. The GLA 250 e 8-speed automatic 8F-DCT. No manual transmission option is available anymore.

=== Safety ===
Euro NCAP test results* Mercedes-Benz B180 Progressive Line (LHD) (2019)
Test	Points	%
Overall:	5 /5 stars	
Adult occupant:	36.6	96%
Child occupant:	44.5	90%
Pedestrian:	37.7	78%
Safety assist:	9.8	75%

ANCAP test results* Mercedes-Benz GLA all variants excluding AMG (see ANCAP Technical Report) (2019, aligned with Euro NCAP)
Test	Points	%
Overall:	5 /5 stars	
Adult occupant:	36.6	96%
Child occupant:	45.2	92%
Pedestrian:	37.9	79%
Safety assist:	10	77%

== Third generation (H248/244; 2026) ==
Third generation
- GLA Electric

Overview
- Model code: H248; H244 (EV)
- Production: September 2026 – present
- Model years: 2027 (North America)
- Assembly: Germany: Rastatt
- Designer: Slavche Tanevski

Body and chassis
- Layout: Front-engine, front-wheel-drive (hybrid); Front-engine, all-wheel-drive (hybrid, 4matic); Rear-motor, rear-wheel-drive (EV); Dual-motor, all-wheel-drive (EV, 4matic)
- Platform: Mercedes-Benz Modular Architecture (MMA)
- Related: Mercedes-Benz GLB (X244/248); Mercedes-Benz CLA (C174/178)

Powertrain
- Engine: 1.5L M252 turbo I4 (hybrid)
- Electric motor: 27 PS (20 kW; 27 hp) permanent-magnet motor (hybrid); 1x or 2x Permanent magnet AC synchronous (EV)
- Power output: 116–157 kW (156–211 hp; 158–213 PS) (hybrid, FWD); 137–157 kW (184–211 hp; 186–213 PS) (hybrid, AWD); 165–200 kW (221–268 hp; 224–272 PS) (EV, RWD); 260 kW (349 hp; 354 PS) (EV, AWD)
- Transmission: 8-speed dual-clutch (hybrid); 2-speed automatic (EV)
- Hybrid drivetrain: High-tech Hybrid
- Battery: Lithium-ion: 1.3 kWh 48V (hybrid); 58.0 kWh LFP (EV); 85.0 kWh Li-NMC (EV)
- Plug-in charging: 320 kW (DC)

Dimensions
- Wheelbase: 2,790 mm (109.8 in)
- Length: 4,565 mm (179.7 in)
- Width: 1,873 mm (73.7 in)
- Height: 1,590 mm (62.6 in)

Chronology
- Predecessor: Mercedes-Benz EQA (GLA Electric)

The third generation GLA was revealed on 29 July 2026, unifies both internal combustion engine and battery electric (EQA) models under the GLA name, similar to the C174 CLA revealed a year prior. While battery electric versions will be available first, the hybrid version will follow in 2027.

Compared to its predecessor, the third generation GLA is 143 mm (5.6 in) longer and 20 mm (0.79 in) lower than its predecessor with a 2.4 in (61 mm) longer wheelbase.

The exterior and interior design of the third generation GLA has been completely redesigned. The battery electric version features Mercedes-Benz's "Iconic Grille", similar to that of the GLC electric, while the hybrid version uses a star pattern instead. The interior uses the MBOS Superscreen featured in various other models, consisting of a 14-inch central display, 14-inch passenger display and 10.25-inch driver display. It has a 410 L (14 cu ft) trunk that expands to 1,400 L (49 cu ft) when the second row is folded down; battery electric models add a 107 L (3.8 cu ft) frunk.

Three battery electric versions are available - the GLA 200 electric with 221 hp (165 kW), GLA 250+ electric with 268 hp (200 kW) and the GLA 350 4Matic electric with 349 hp (260 kW) and a 0-100 km/h acceleration time of 5.3 seconds. All versions use a nickel-manganese-cobalt (NMC) battery, featuring a usable capacity of either 58.0 kWh (GLA 200 electric) or 85.0 kWh. Mercedes-Benz claims the GLA electric will offer up to 657 km (408 mi) of range and can charge up to 320 kW.

Rear View

Interior

== Sales ==
Year	Europe	U.S.	Mexico	China
2013	225			
2014	44,710	6,884	534	
2015	63,425	25,593	1,110	42,662
2016	67,070	24,545	1,841	66,909
2017	72,869	24,104	1,940	70,802
2018	72,798	24,136	2,038	61,003
2019	70,608	22,136	1,685	39,273
2020	55,911	16,509	939	16,290
2021	75,124	14,322		33,135
2022				
2023				23,816
2024				8,901
2025				4,690
