= Mercedes-Benz EQA =

Battery electric subcompact luxury crossover SUV

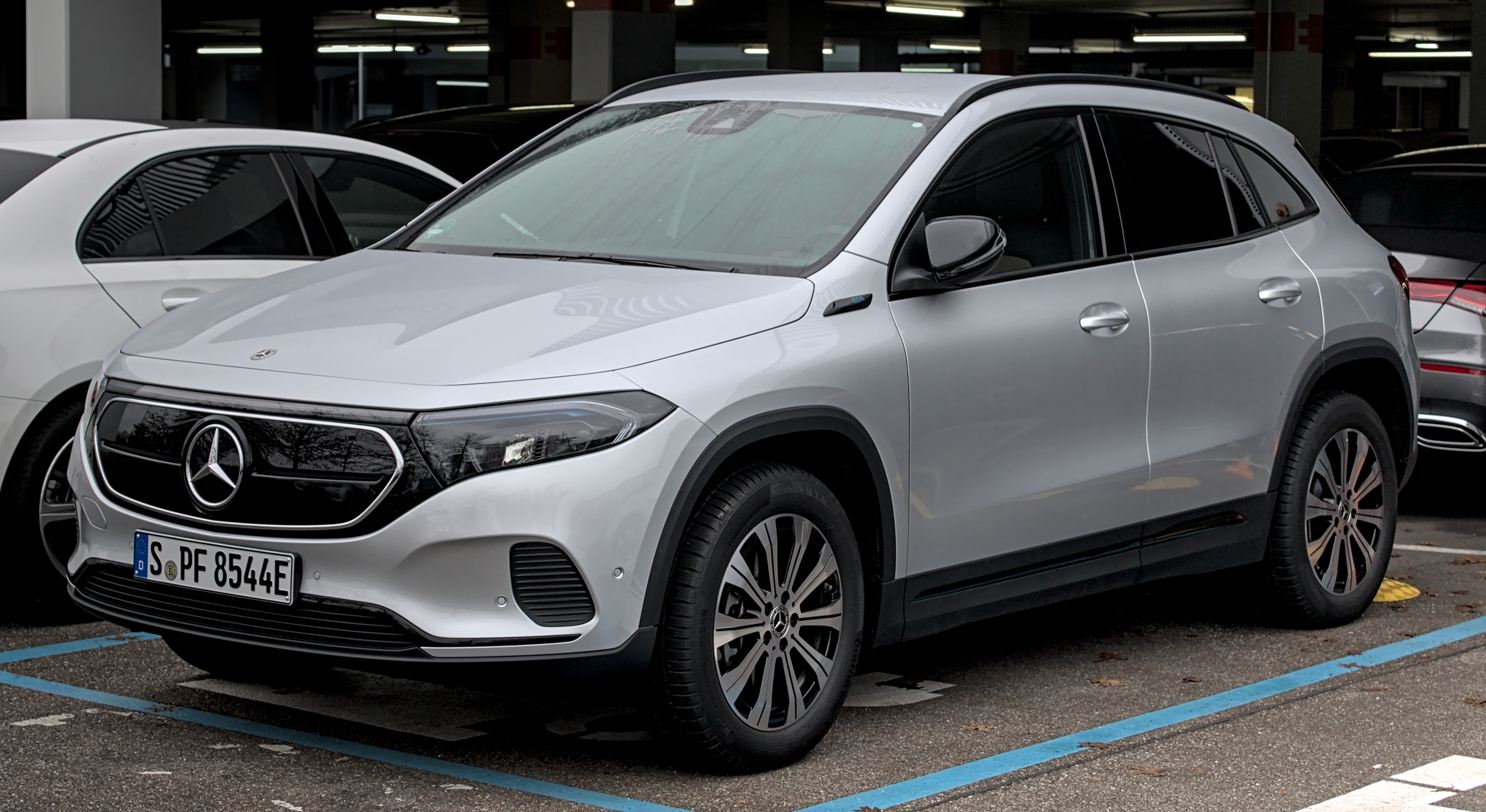

Overview
- Manufacturer: Daimler AG (2021–2022); Mercedes-Benz Group (2022–2026)
- Model code: H243
- Production: February 2021 – 2026
- Model years: 2022–2026
- Assembly: Germany: Rastatt; China: Beijing (Beijing Benz)
- Designer: Balázs Filczer

Body and chassis
- Class: Subcompact luxury crossover SUV (C)
- Body style: 5-door SUV
- Layout: Front-motor, front-wheel-drive; Dual-motor, all-wheel-drive (4MATIC)
- Platform: Mercedes-Benz MFA2
- Related: Mercedes-Benz GLA (H247); Mercedes-Benz A-Class (W/V/Z177); Mercedes-Benz CLA (C/X118); Mercedes-Benz B-Class (W247); Mercedes-Benz GLB (X247); Mercedes-Benz EQB

Powertrain
- Electric motor: Asynchronous motor (ASM); EQA 250+: Permanent magnet AC synchronous motor (PMSM)
- Transmission: Single-speed with fixed ratio
- Battery: 66.5 kWh lithium-ion 70.5 kWh lithium-ion (EQA 250+)
- Range: 427 km (265 mi) (WLTP); 486 km (302 mi) (NEDC); 490 km (304 mi) (WLTP) (EQA 250 since 2022); 540 km (336 mi) (WLTP) (EQA 250+)
- Plug-in charging: Type 2: 11 kW (AC); CCS: 100 kW (DC)

Dimensions
- Wheelbase: 2,729 mm (107.4 in)
- Length: 4,463 mm (175.7 in)
- Width: 1,834 mm (72.2 in)
- Height: 1,620 mm (63.8 in)
- Kerb weight: 1,965–2,105 kg (4,332–4,641 lb)

Chronology
- Successor: Mercedes-Benz GLA Electric

The Mercedes-Benz EQA is a battery electric subcompact luxury crossover SUV (C-segment) produced by German luxury vehicle brand Mercedes-Benz since February 2021. It is part of the EQ family, a range of vehicles expanded by 10 models in 2022. The vehicle uses the MFA2 platform, which designates C-segment and smaller-sized D-segment vehicles which use a base front-wheel drive layout.

As of 2023, the EQA is the smallest vehicle in the EQ Series, slotting beneath the D-segment EQB. The name "EQA" blends EQ, Mercedes' electric vehicle group, with the letter A, which signifies that the vehicle is the smallest of its class.

== Overview ==
=== Concept ===
The EQA was previewed by the EQA Concept which was revealed in September 2017. The Concept EQA is not a crossover but a small family hatchback that is 4,285 mm (168.7 in) long, 1,810 mm (71 in) wide, and 1,428 mm (56.2 in) tall. The EQA concept features dual electric motors for all-wheel drive that produces a combined system output of 268 hp (200 kW) and 368 lb⋅ft (499 N⋅m).

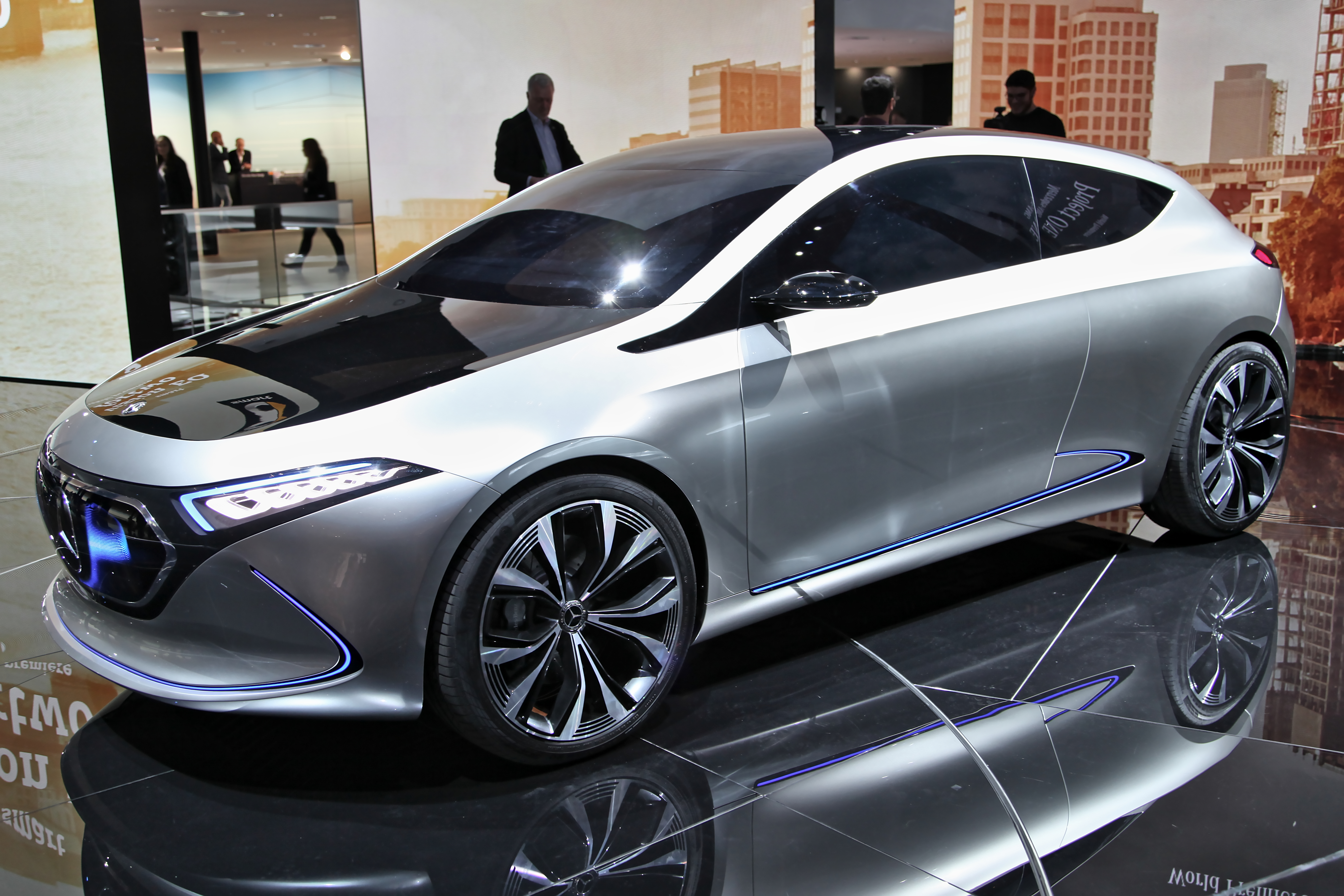
Mercedes-Benz EQA Concept

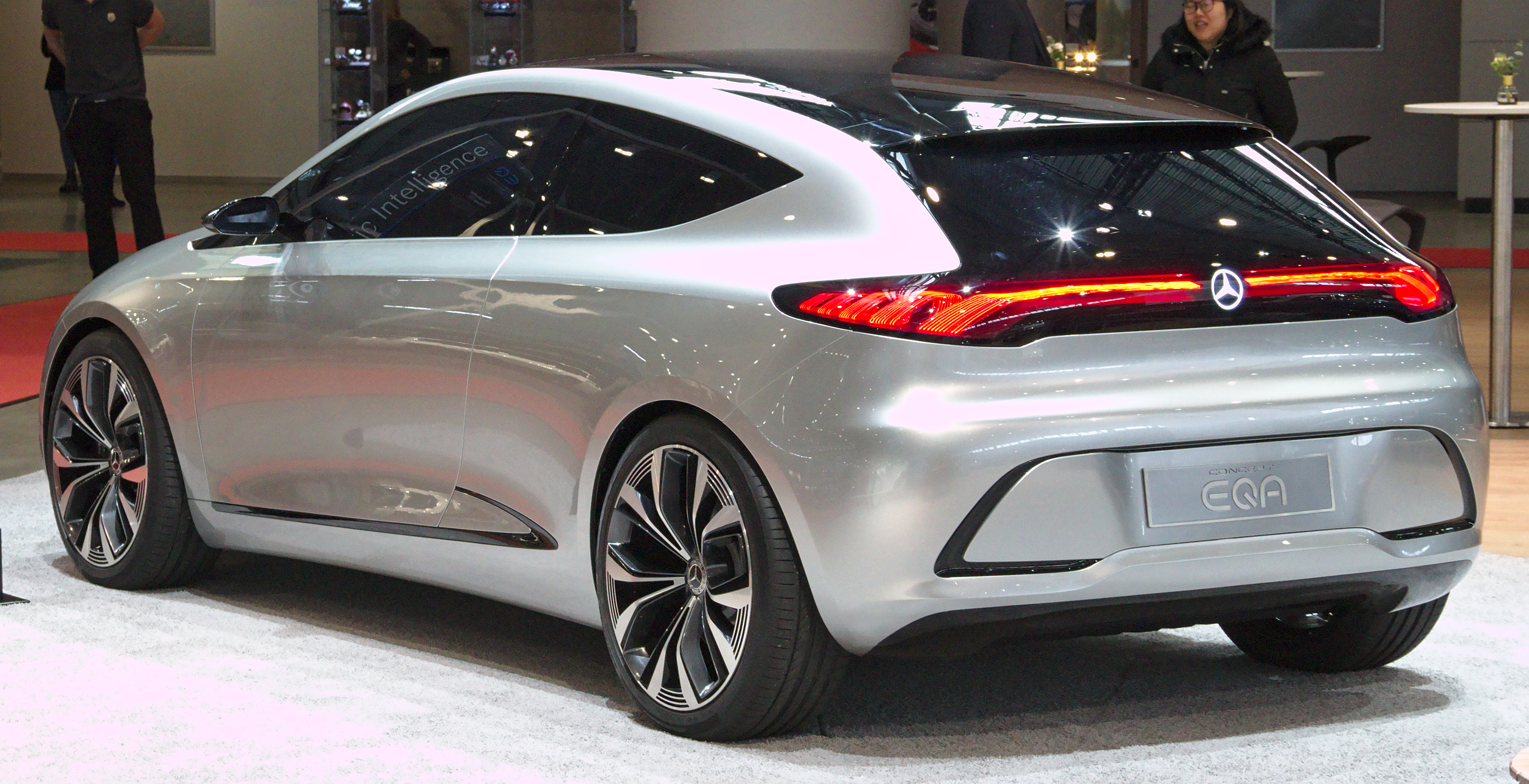
Mercedes-Benz EQA Concept

=== Development and launch ===
Internally designated H243, the EQA is based on the MFA2 (second-generation Modular Front-Drive Architecture) platform which it shares with the ICE-powered second-generation GLA that debuted in 2020. The vehicle was revealed with the larger EQB in January 2021, and later went on sale in April of that year. At 4,463 mm (175.7 in) long, it is just slightly longer than its ICE counterpart. The vehicle was designed by a team under the direction of Balázs Filczer who designed the GLS and the G-Class.

At launch, the only version available was the front-wheel drive EQA 250 (EQA 260 in China). It has a 190 hp (142 kW) electric motor powering the front wheels. Later, Mercedes had announced a more powerful version, using two motors for all-wheel drive and putting out over 260 hp (194 kW). A longer-range version was also announced.

The EQA 250+ was unveiled in March 2022 with a longer range (540 km WLTP), bigger battery (70.5 kwh), improved aerodynamics and a 140 kW permanent-magnet synchronous motor (PMSM) more efficient than the asynchronous motor of other versions. In May 2022, the EQA 250's range has been increased to 490 km WLTP, probably by using the same motor as the new EQA 250+.

Front-wheel drive comes standard on EQA 250 models, but all-wheel drive on the 300 and the 350 models using the 4matic system. All models use a single-speed transmission. The vehicle is 52 mm (2.0 in) longer and 9 mm (0.35 in) taller than the GLA, however its width and wheelbase remain the same. Weight ranges from 1,965 kg (4,332 lb) to 2,105 kg (4,641 lb) primarily because of battery size and weight. The variant tested by Euro NCAP was an all-wheel drive 2,040 kg (4,500 lb) variant.

Electric motors are supplied by ZF Friedrichshafen. Batteries are placed below the floor. The EQA features "one-pedal driving", which essentially collects kinetic energy and puts it into the battery, which boosts the vehicle's range. All EQA models feature Mercedes' comfort suspension system, which gives a high level of comfort while driving long distances. The Premium package features adaptive dampers which give a more dynamic ride. Safety systems include: Blind Spot Assist, Active Lane Keep Assist and Active Brake Assist.

The EQA adds a trim called the "Edition 1" trim, which adds 20-inch alloys, leather seats and AMG trimming compared to the normal 250. A limited number of them will be available.

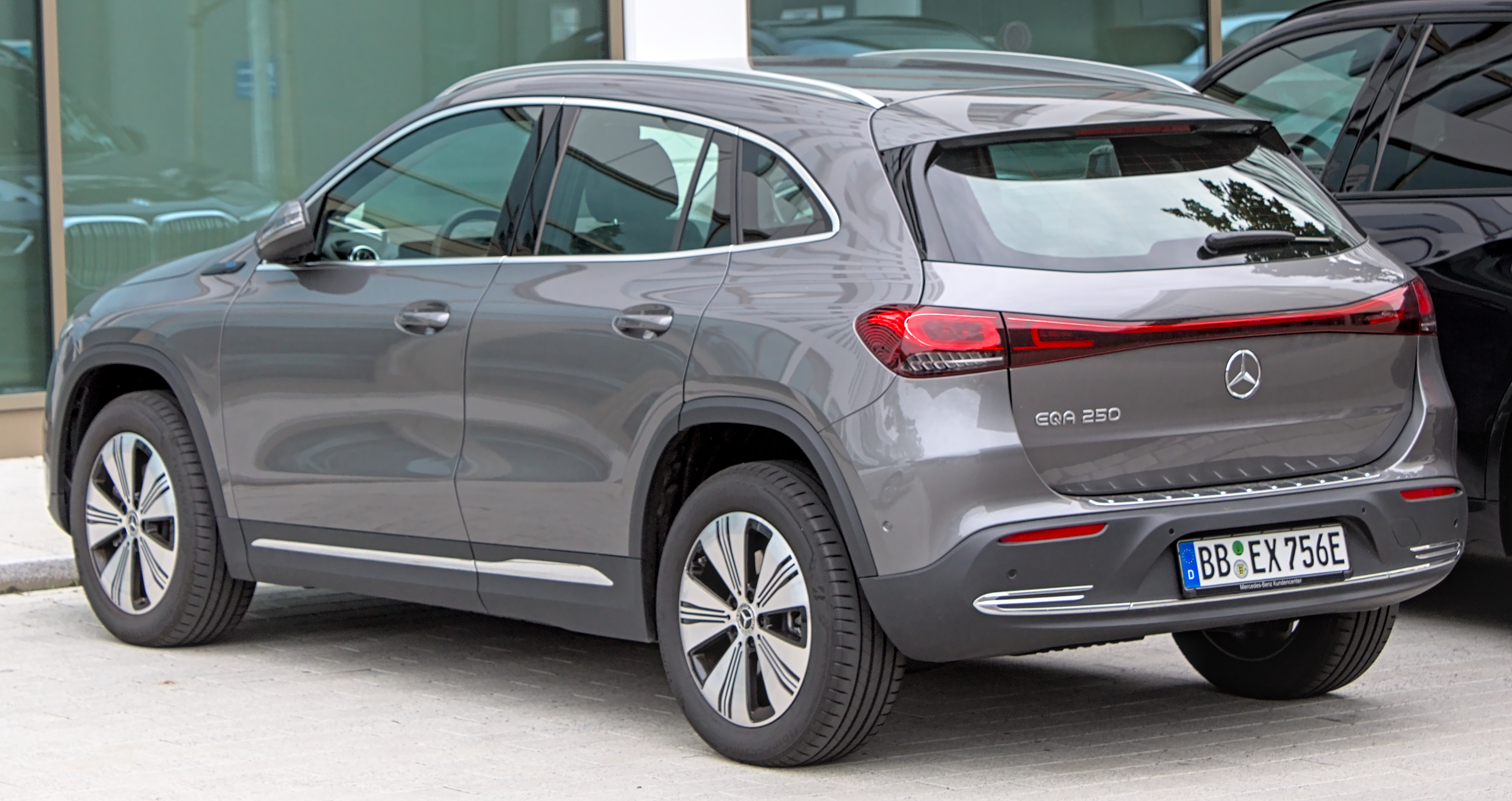
Rear view (pre-facelift)

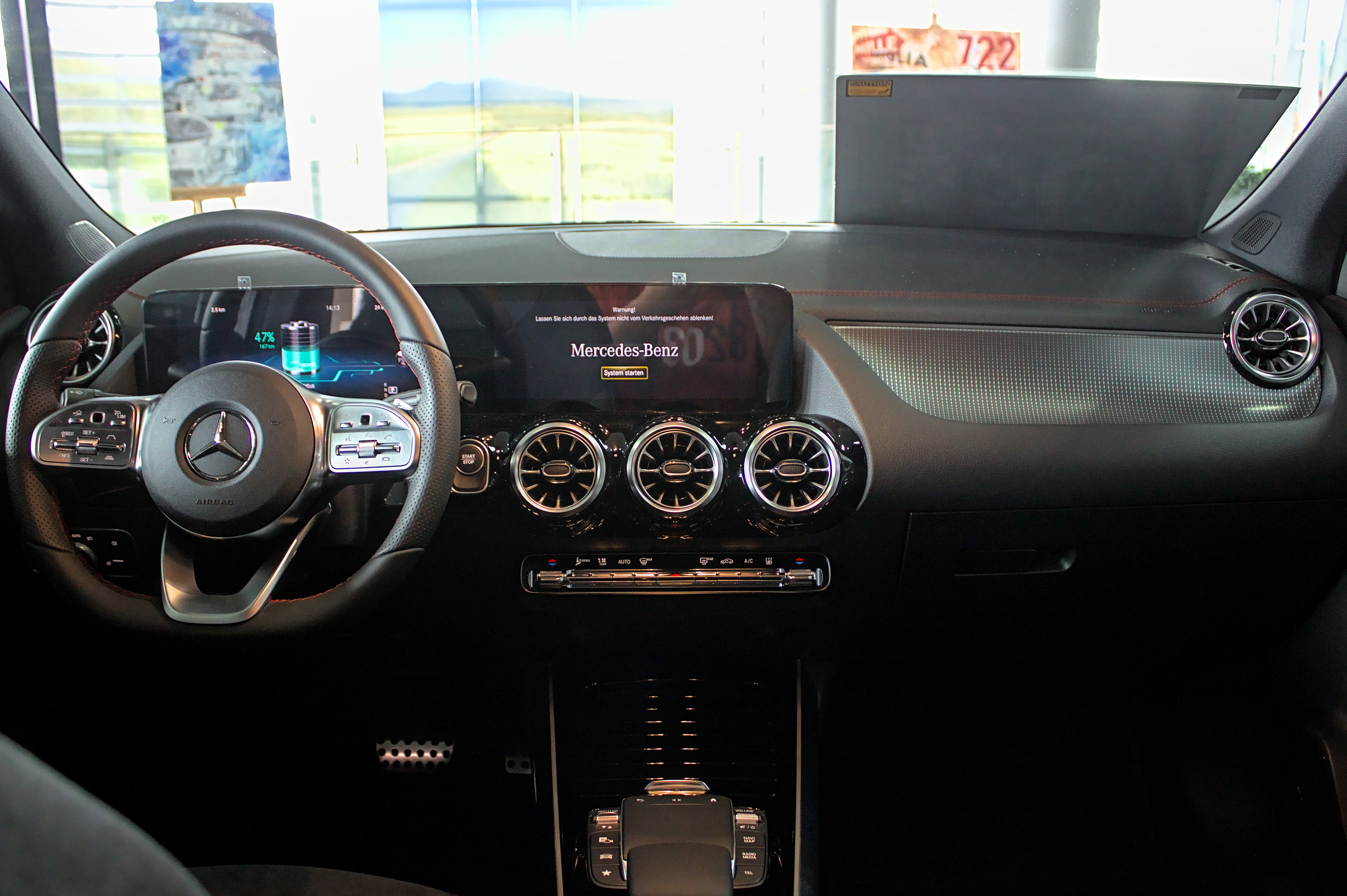
Interior

=== Design ===
The full-width strip lamps which are placed on both front and rear were inspired by the EQC, which was the first vehicle to be a part of the EQ Series. The vehicle features the brand's characteristic "Black Panel" radiator grille introduced on all EQ models. The AMG-Line model adds a twin-blade design to the grille. The front features standard full-LED headlights which are connected seamlessly by a fibre optic strip. The license plate is placed on the bumper, which lets the full-LED taillights to give a full effect.

Its drag coefficient of 0.28 improves aerodynamics which helps to expand range. Compared to the GLA, the EQA's interior is almost indistinguishable, if not for the rose gold trim inserts on the vents, key, and seats. It also features slight trim backlighting. Mercedes states the EQA offers the desired ride height, combined with versatility. The EQA retains the 40:20:40 split-folding rear seats from the GLA.

Its boot space stands at 340 litres (12 cu ft), approximately 100 L less than the GLA. Folding the rear seats makes boot space stand at 1,320 litres (47 cu ft), which is about 110 L less than its ICE-powered equivalent. The dual-screen setup includes a pair of 10.0-inch screens that run the Mercedes-Benz User Experience (MBUX) system.

=== Charging ===
Charging via a Type 2 connector (AC) supports a capacity of up to 11 kilowatts takes a time of 6 hours and 30 minutes (390 minutes). DC fast charging through a CCS port supports a capacity of up to 100 kilowatts and takes a time of 33 minutes for a 10-80% charge. Charging using a basic wallbox socket supports a capacity of up to 7.4 kilowatts takes about 10 hours using a large battery. Charging using a smaller battery will take 9 hours.

== Markets ==
=== China ===
The EQA started production in China in November 2021, assembled locally in the Beijing Benz factory. The EQA 300 4MATIC and EQB 350 4MATIC were the first models released, with the EQA 260 variant added in April 2022.

==== Hong Kong ====
In Hong Kong, the EQA launched in late January 2022. Available packages begin with the "Premium Lite", which comes with a 360° camera and 18-inch wheels. The "Premium Lite+" package adds the MBUX Innovation package, MBUX Interior Assist, and a head-up display. The "Dynamic Lite" package adds 19-inch, AMG twin-spoke alloy wheels, and the Dynamic Lite+ package also adds the MBUX integration and a head-up display. The "Elite Lite" package includes 20-inch AMG multi-spoke alloy wheels, and the "Elite Lite+" adds the MBUX integration to that.

=== Australia ===
The EQA was released in Australia in April 2021. Versions include the "Progressive" trim, which comes with 19-inch AMG twin-spoke alloy wheels, painted in high-gloss black. The AMG Line model adds AMG-type front and rear aprons with chrome trim, the "Black Panel" radiator grille, side trims in black, and upgraded 20-inch wheels of a different design.

=== Europe ===
The vehicle launched in its home market in February 2021. Prices start at €37,970. 18-inch wheels are available on the unmodified 250 model, but the AMG Line adds 20-inch wheels, Artico leather and Dinamica upholstery, door sill illumination, AMG floor mats and aluminium pedals. The Premium package features 19-inch AMG-type wheels, a panoramic glass roof, the KEYLESS-GO system, augmented reality navigation system, Wireless charging and a premium audio system. MBUX system and a digital instrument cluster are both available. The Advanced Package, Advanced Plus Package and Premium Package are available as extra packages.

== 2024 facelift ==
In August 2023, Mercedes had revealed the EQA and the EQB facelifts for the 2024 model year. The vehicle receives aesthetic changes which bring it more into the line of the larger EQE SUV and EQS SUV. The vehicle receives a new front grille, and an optional front bumper. At the rear, the taillights gain an intricate 3D light signature, and the lights are tinted for a shade of dark red.

The interior updates feature a new three-spoke steering wheel with capacitive controls, trim pieces on the dashboard and the doors to represent illuminated Mercedes logos, and a larger infotainment screen. The 2024 EQA also adds the Plug & Charge system, which allows the vehicle to charge without human authentication. New 18-, 19- and 20-inch alloy wheel designs are available. New colours, including "Spectral Blue Metallic" which was also introduced on the H247 LCI and "High-Tech Silver Metallic" will both be available. On the EQA, the 250+ model receives an extra 37 mi (60 km) of range.

The facelift became available for order in the first quarter of 2024, and deliveries began in the second quarter of that year.

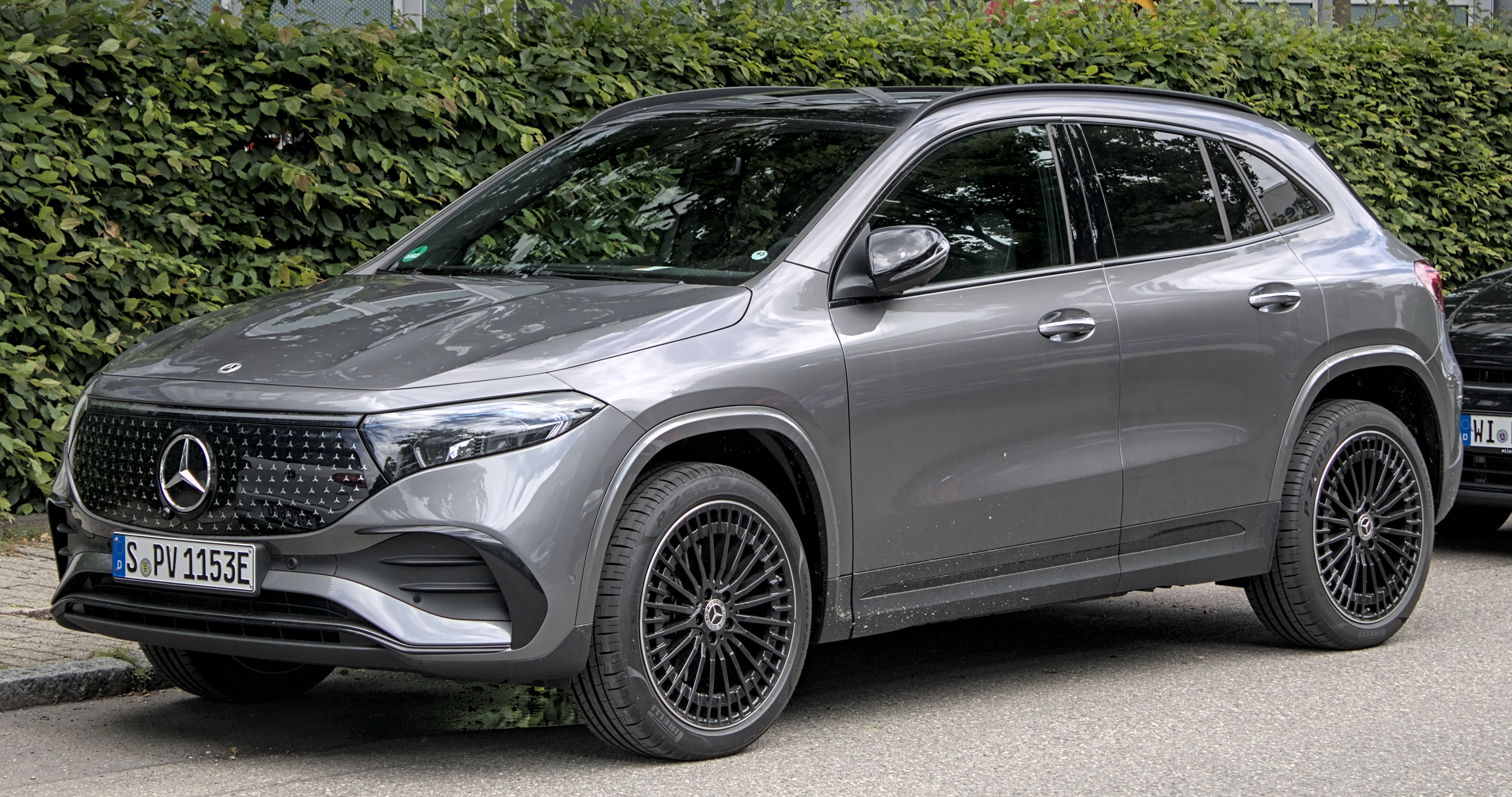
Mercedes-Benz EQA 350 (facelift)

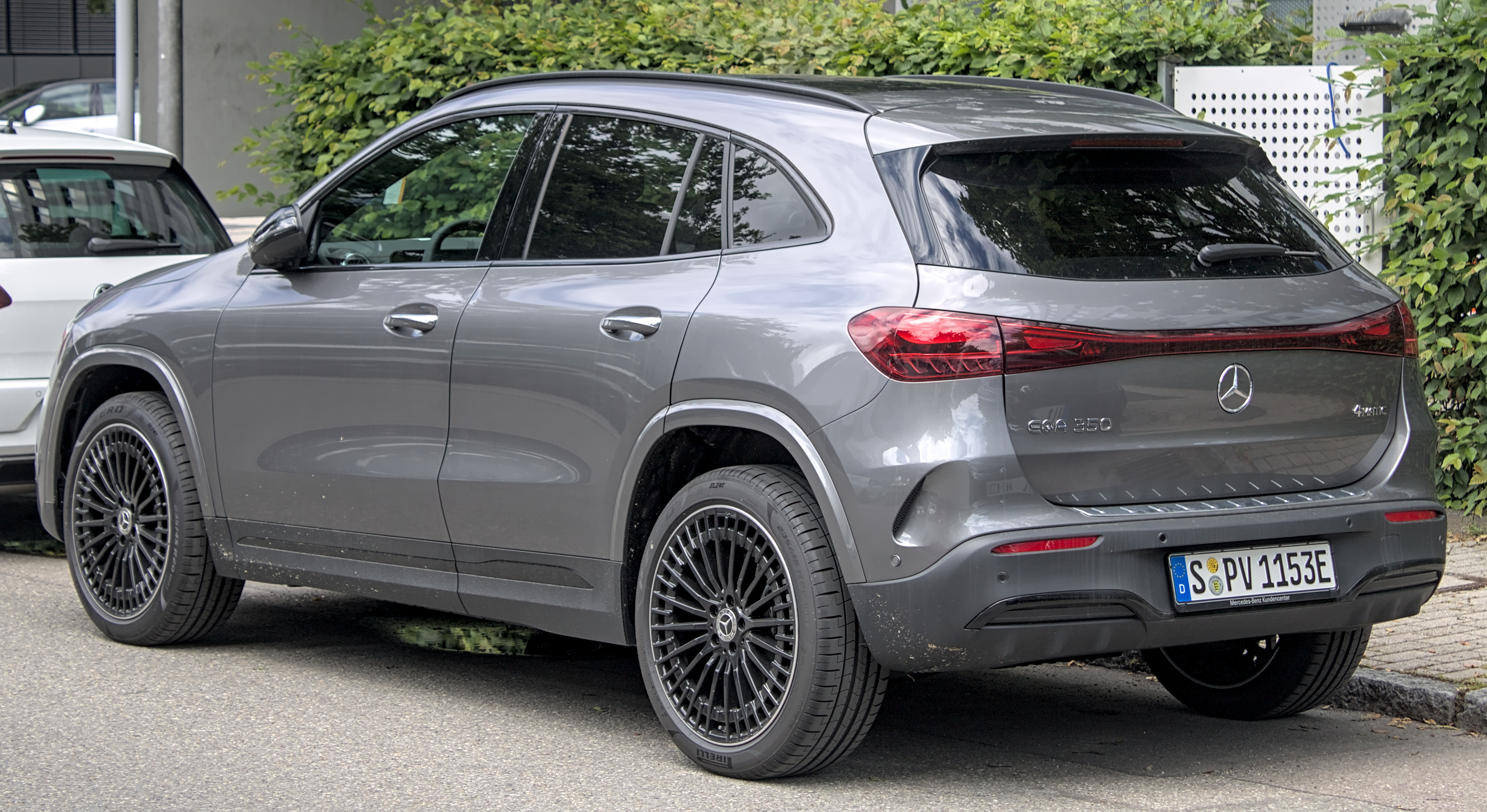
Mercedes-Benz EQA 350 (facelift)

== Models ==
Models start at the EQA 250 which uses a front-wheel drive powertrain and has a gross battery capacity of 69.7 kWh and a battery voltage of 420-volts. Power and torque is 190 hp (140 kW) and 375 N⋅m (277 lbf⋅ft) respectively. Its electric motor code is "EM0021". The EQA 250+ features a gross battery capacity of 73.9 kWh. Power and torque is 190 hp (140 kW) and 385 N⋅m (284 lbf⋅ft), and its motor code is "EM0026". The EQA 300 4MATIC uses an all-wheel drive powertrain and has a gross battery capacity of 69.7 kWh. Its power and torque is 228 hp (168 kW) and 390 N⋅m (290 lbf⋅ft) respectively. The range tops out at the EQA 350+ 4MATIC which has 292 hp (215 kW) and 520 N⋅m (380 lbf⋅ft) of power and torque and a battery capacity of 69.7 kWh.

All models except the EQA 250+ use an AC permanent-magnet synchronous electric motor. The EQA 250+ dual motor model use two asynchronous motors.

=== Powertrain ===
The specifications include:

Model	Years	Power	Torque	Drivetrain	0–100 km/h (0–62 mph)	Top speed	Range (WLTP)	Battery Capacity full/usable [kWh]
EQA 250	2021–2022	140 kW (190 hp)	375 N⋅m (277 lb⋅ft)	FWD	8.9 s	160 km/h (99 mph)	426 km (265 mi)	69.7/66.5
EQA 250	2022–	140 kW (190 hp)	385 N⋅m (284 lb⋅ft)	FWD	8.6 s	160 km/h (99 mph)	490 km (304 mi)	69.7/66.5
EQA 250+	2022–2023	140 kW (190 hp)	385 N⋅m (284 lb⋅ft)	FWD	8.6 s	160 km/h (99 mph)	500 km (311 mi)	73.9/70.5
EQA 250+	2023–	140 kW (190 hp)	385 N⋅m (284 lb⋅ft)	FWD	8.6 s	160 km/h (99 mph)	563 km (350 mi)	73.9/70.5
EQA 300; 4MATIC	2021–	168 kW (228 hp)	390 N⋅m (288 lb⋅ft)	AWD	7.7 s	160 km/h (99 mph)	400–426 km (249–265 mi)	69.7/66.5
EQA 350; 4MATIC+	2021–	215 kW (292 hp)	520 N⋅m (384 lb⋅ft)	AWD	6 s	160 km/h (99 mph)	409–432 km (254–268 mi)	69.7/66.5

== Safety ==
In a Euro NCAP testing conducted in 2019, the all-wheel drive EQA had received five stars. It received 97% for adult occupants, 90% for child occupants, 81% for pedestrians, and 75% for safety-assistance technologies.

Mercedes-Benz EQA (2019)
Euro NCAP Test Results
Star rating:			
Test	Points	Out of	%
Adult rating:	37.0	38	97%
Child occupant:	44.5	49	90%
Vulnerable Road Users:	39.9	48	81%
Safety assist:	9.8	13	75%

ANCAP test results* Mercedes-Benz EQA (2019, aligned with Euro NCAP)
Test	Points	%
Overall:	5 /5 stars	
Adult occupant:	37	97%
Child occupant:	45.5	92%
Pedestrian:	39.3	81%
Safety assist:	10	77%

== Sales ==
Year	China
2023	4,623
2024	2,648
2025	1,757
