= Mercedes-Benz EQB =

Battery electric mid-size luxury crossover SUV

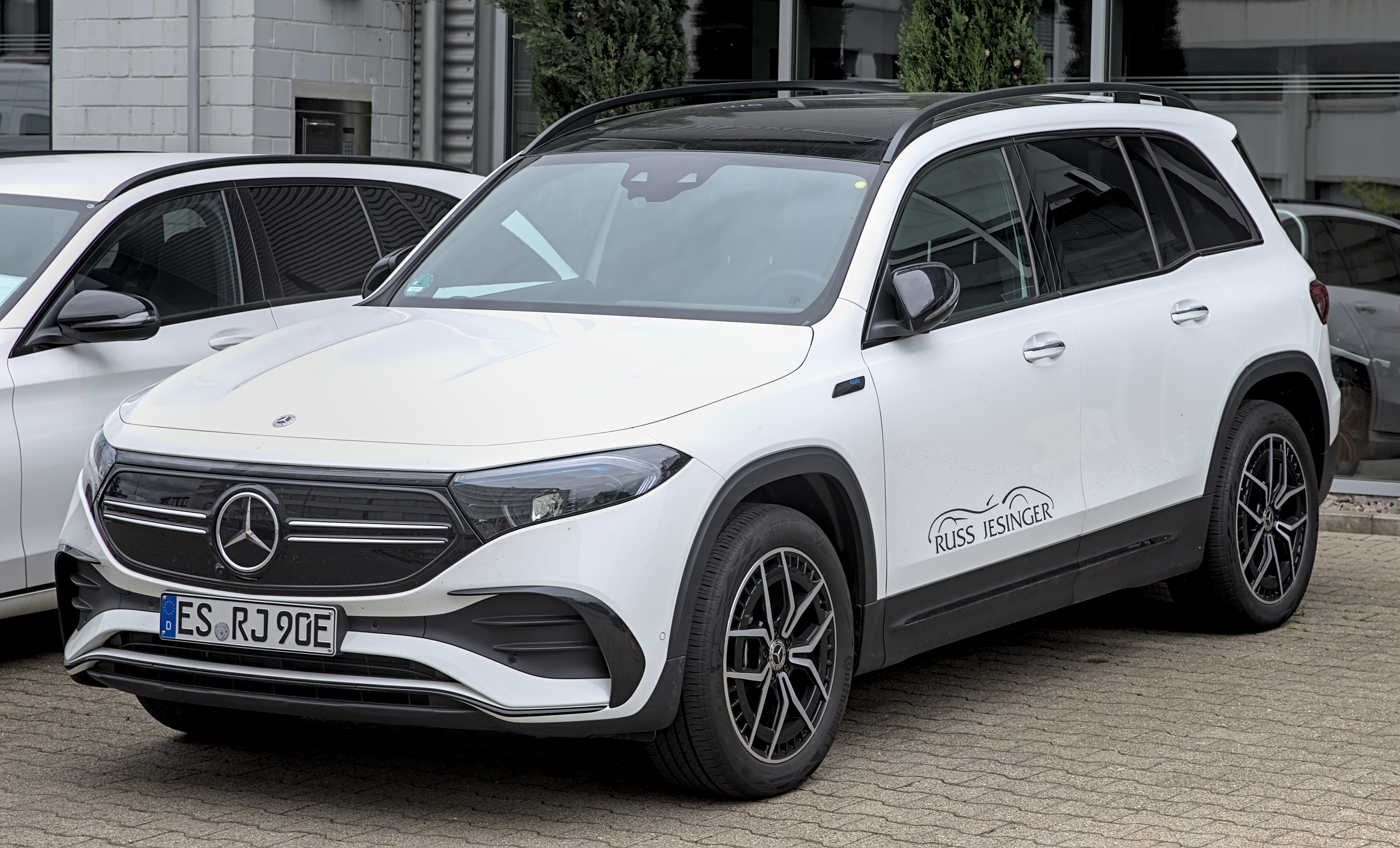
- 2022 Mercedes-Benz EQB 300

Overview
- Manufacturer: Daimler AG (2021–2022); Mercedes-Benz Group (2022–2026)
- Model code: X243
- Production: 2021–2026
- Model years: 2022–2026
- Assembly: Hungary: Kecskemét (Mercedes-Benz Kecskemét Plant); China: Beijing (Beijing Benz)
- Designer: Balázs Filczer

Body and chassis
- Class: Compact luxury / mid-size crossover SUV (D)
- Body style: 5-door SUV
- Layout: EQB 250: Front-motor, front-wheel drive; EQB 300/350 4MATIC: Twin-motors, four-wheel drive
- Platform: Mercedes-Benz MFA2
- Related: Mercedes-Benz GLB-Class

Powertrain
- Electric motor: asynchronous motor (front) permanent magnet motor (rear): 140 kW (188 hp) (Single); 168 kW (225 hp) (Dual); 215 kW (288 hp) (Dual)
- Battery: 66.5 kWh
- Electric range: 256 mi (412 km)

Dimensions
- Wheelbase: 2,829 mm (111 in)
- Length: 4,684 mm (184 in)
- Width: 1,834 mm (72 in)
- Height: 1,667 mm (66 in)

Chronology
- Successor: Mercedes-Benz GLB with EQ Technology

The Mercedes-Benz EQB (X243) is a seven-seat battery electric mid-size D-segment crossover SUV produced by the German automobile manufacturer Mercedes-Benz from 2021 to 2026.

== Overview ==
The EQB is part of the EQ family and is based on the Mercedes-Benz GLB. The EQB is available in both front-wheel drive and 4MATIC branded dual motor all wheel drive configurations. The Mercedes EQB is available in five and seven seat layouts.

The Mercedes-Benz EQBs for the Chinese market are manufactured at the Beijing Benz plant in China. Mercedes Benz-EQBs sold outside of China are manufactured at the Mercedes-Benz Kecskemet plant in Hungary, unlike the non-Chinese market fossil-fuel powered GLBs, which are manufactured at Daimler AG-Nissan joint venture COMPAS plant in Mexico. The global EQB was initially intended to be manufactured in the Smartville factory (Hambach, France), but this plan was cancelled following the sale of this plant to Ineos.

Sales of the Mercedes-Benz EQB began in late 2021 in China and Europe. Sales of the EQB began in 2022 in other markets outside of China and Europe.

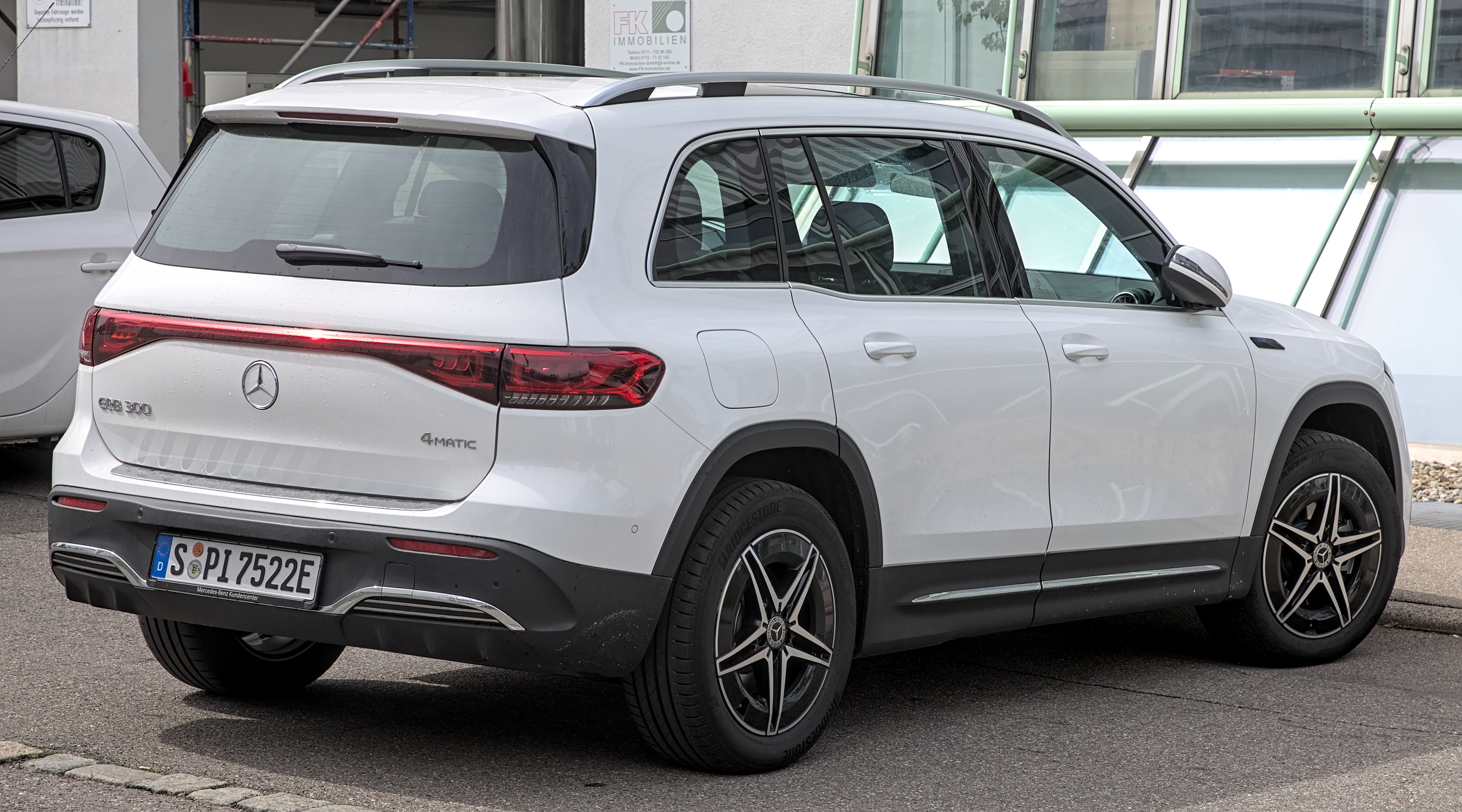
Rear view

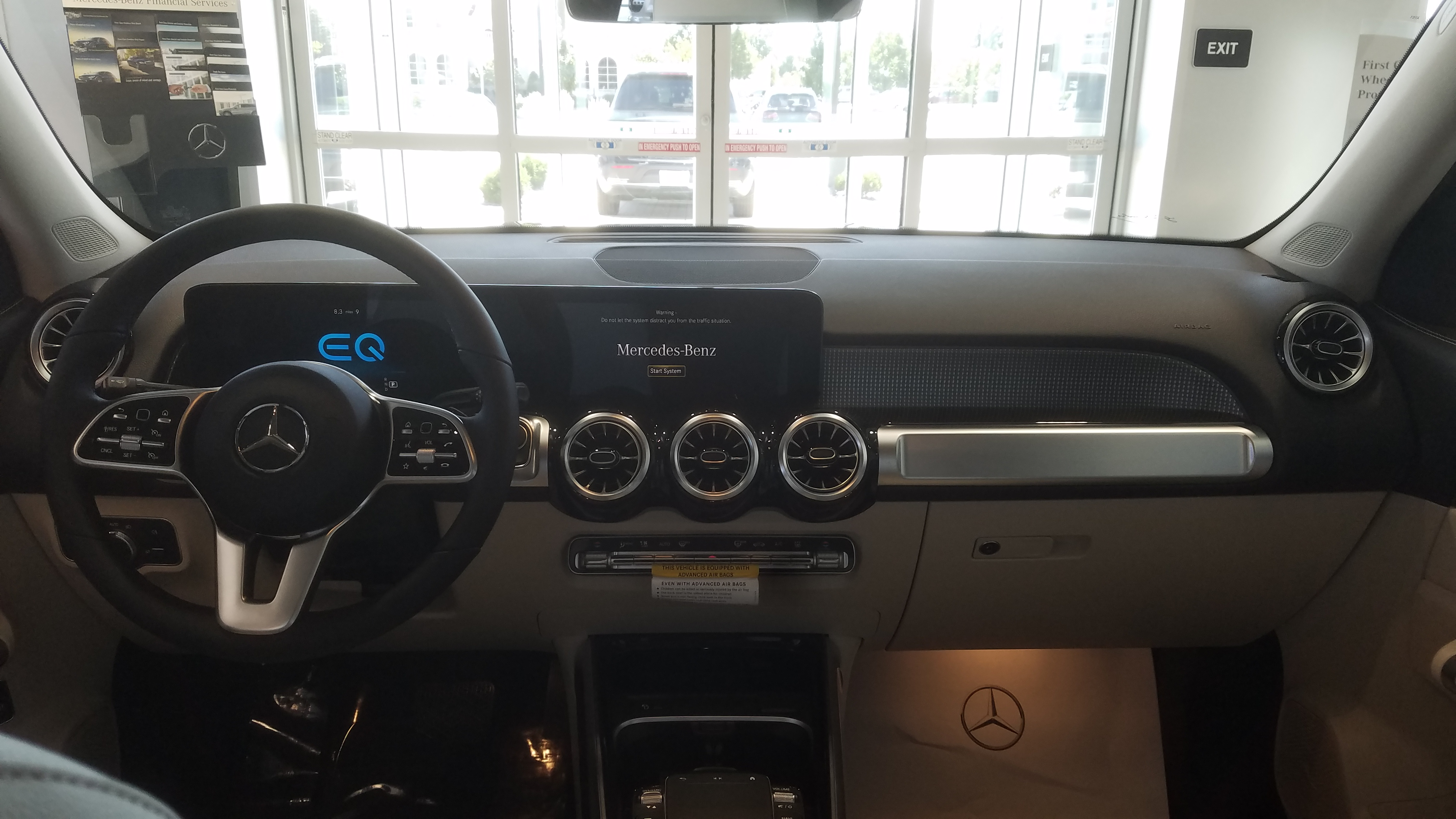
Interior

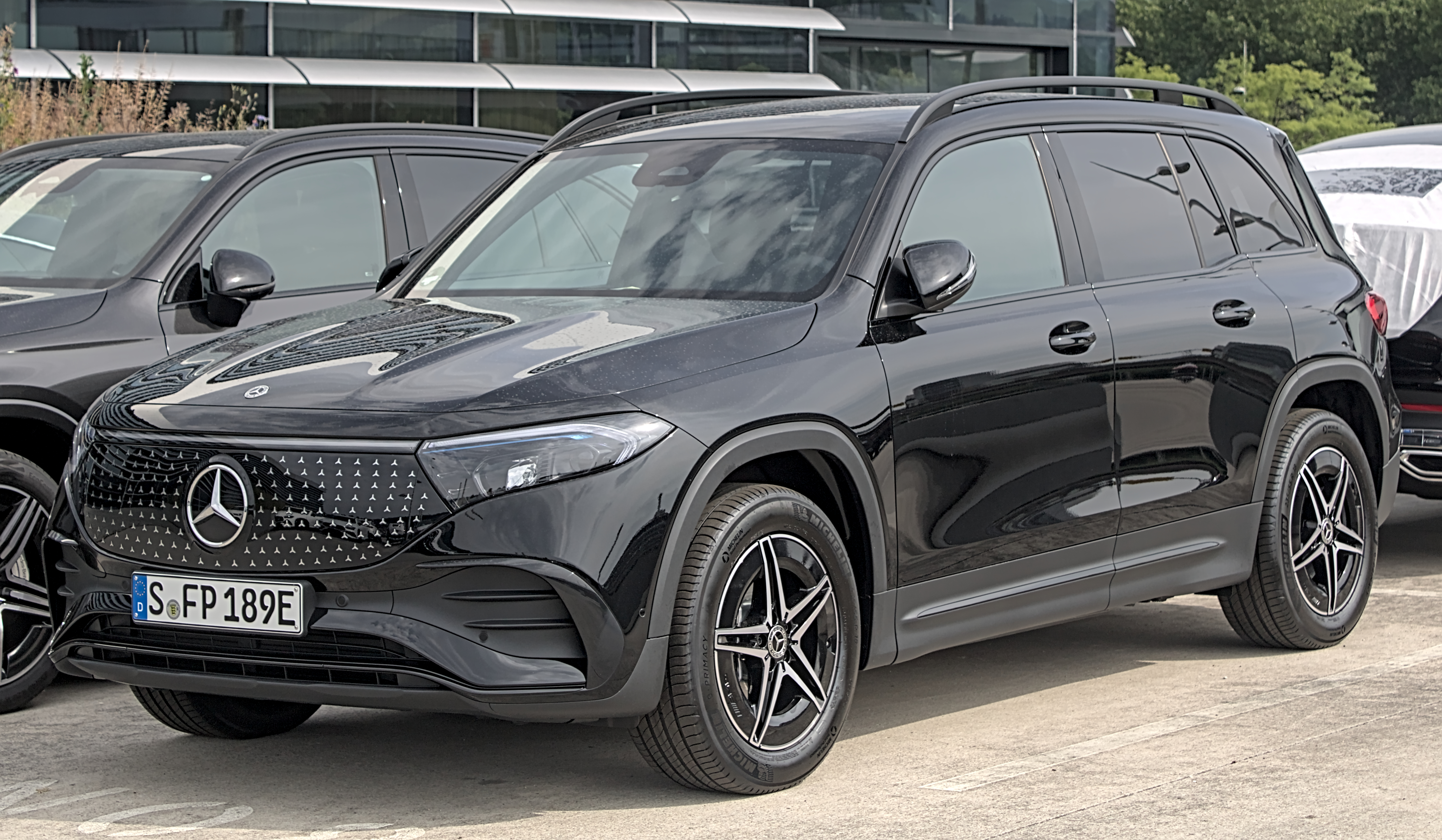
Mercedes-Benz EQB 250+ (facelift)

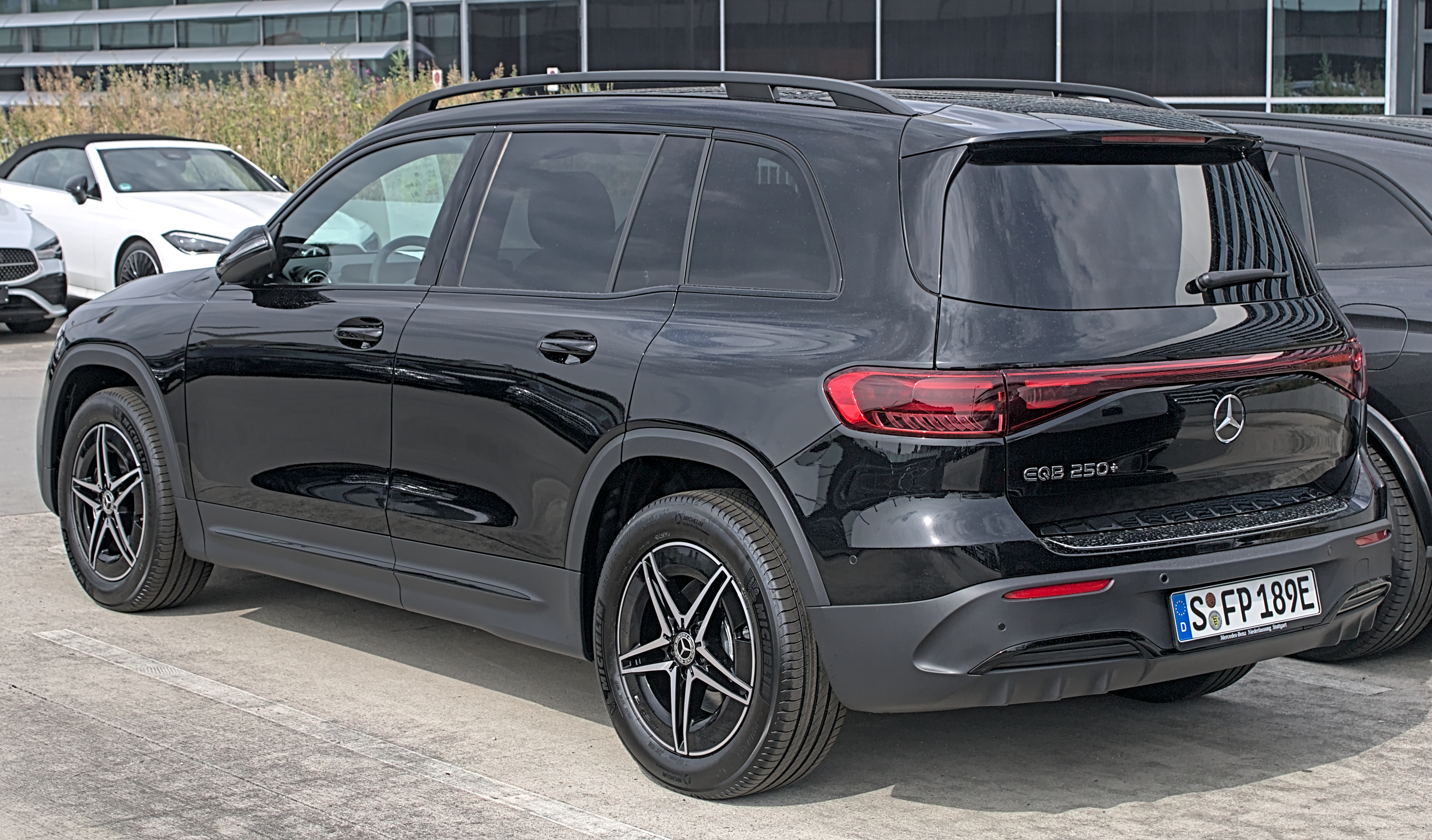
Rear view

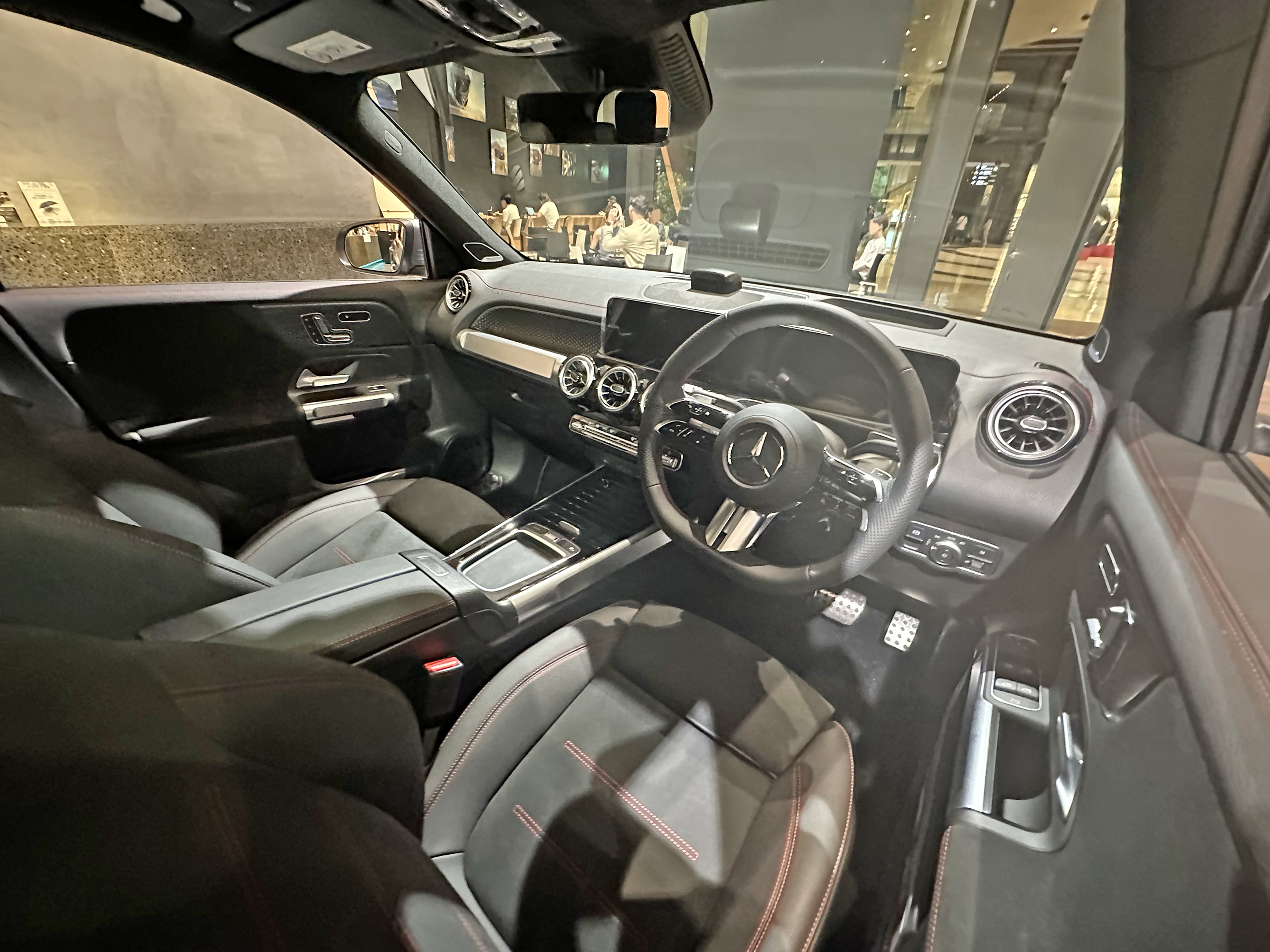
Interior (facelift)

== Models ==
The specifications include:

Model	Years	Power	Torque	0–100 km/h (0–62 mph)	Top speed	Range (WLTP)
EQB 250	2021–2026	140 kW (188 hp)	385 N⋅m (284 lb⋅ft)	9.2 s	160 km/h (99 mph)	452 km (281 mi)
EQB 300 4MATIC	2021–2026	168 kW (225 hp)	390 N⋅m (288 lb⋅ft)	7.7 s	160 km/h (99 mph)	412 km (256 mi)
EQB 350 4MATIC	2021–2026	215 kW (288 hp)	520 N⋅m (384 lb⋅ft)	6.0 s	160 km/h (99 mph)	412 km (256 mi)

== Safety ==
=== ANCAP ===
ANCAP test results Mercedes-Benz EQB 250 only (2019, aligned with Euro NCAP)
Test	Points	%
Overall:	5 /5 stars	
Adult occupant:	36.4	95%
Child occupant:	44.7	91%
Pedestrian:	37.5	78%
Safety assist:	9.9	76%

=== Euro NCAP ===
Euro NCAP test results Mercedes-EQ EQB (2019)
Test	Points	%
Overall:	5 /5 stars	
Adult occupant:	36.4	95%
Child occupant:	44.8	91%
Pedestrian:	37.5	78%
Safety assist:	9.7	74%

== Sales ==
Year	China
2023	6,697
2024	4,988
2025	3,716
