= Mercedes-Benz MMA platform =

Battery and hybrid automobile platform

Mercedes-Benz MMA

Overview
- Manufacturer: Mercedes-Benz Group
- Production: 2025–present
- Assembly: Hungary: Kecskemét (Mercedes-Benz Manufacturing Hungary); Germany: Rastatt; China: Beijing (Beijing Benz); Thailand: Samut Prakan (TAAP)

Body and chassis
- Vehicles: Mercedes-Benz CLA (C118); Mercedes-Benz GLB (X244); Mercedes-Benz GLA (H244)

Dimensions
- Wheelbase: 2,790–2,890 mm (110–114 in)

Chronology
- Predecessor: Mercedes-Benz MFA2 platform

Mercedes-Benz announced the Mercedes-Benz Modular Architecture (MMA) platform in 2024, as an electric-first platform for battery electric and hybrid vehicles. The first car released on the platform was the 2025 CLA, followed by the 2026 GLB and 2027 GLA.

== Gallery ==
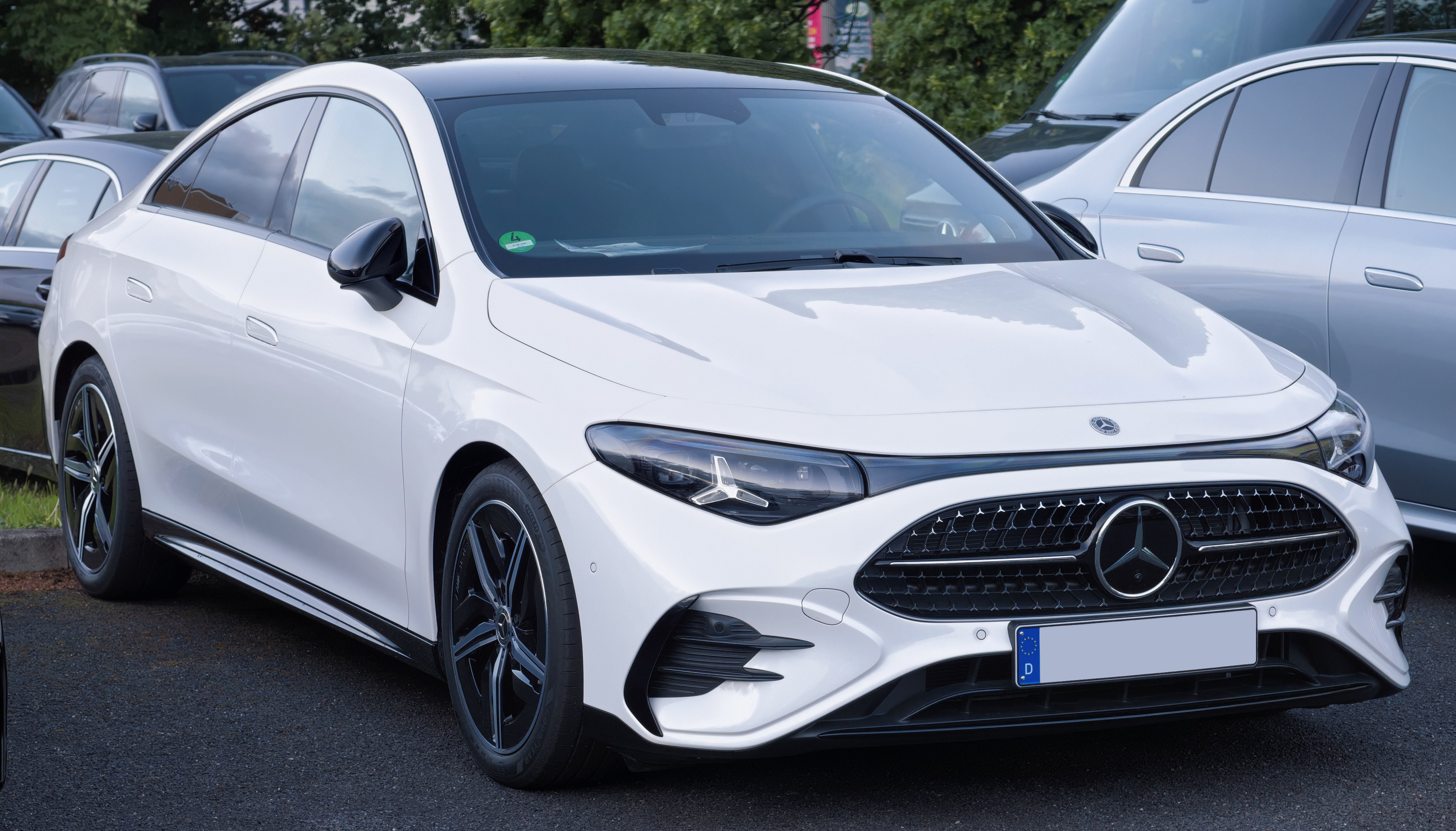
Mercedes-Benz CLA (C178)

Mercedes-Benz GLA (H244)

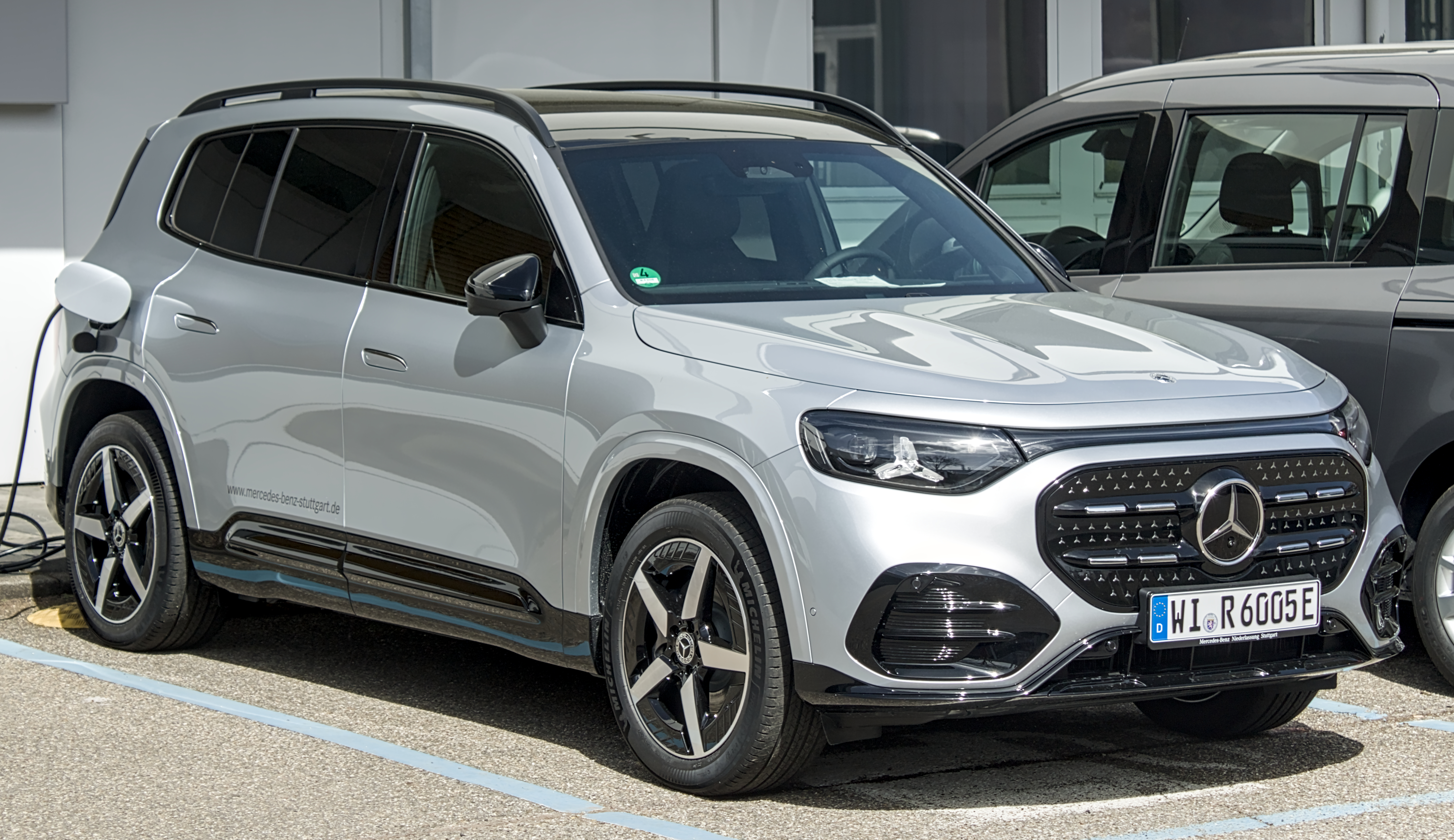
Mercedes-Benz GLB (X244)
