= Mercedes-Benz GLB =

Mid-size luxury crossover SUV

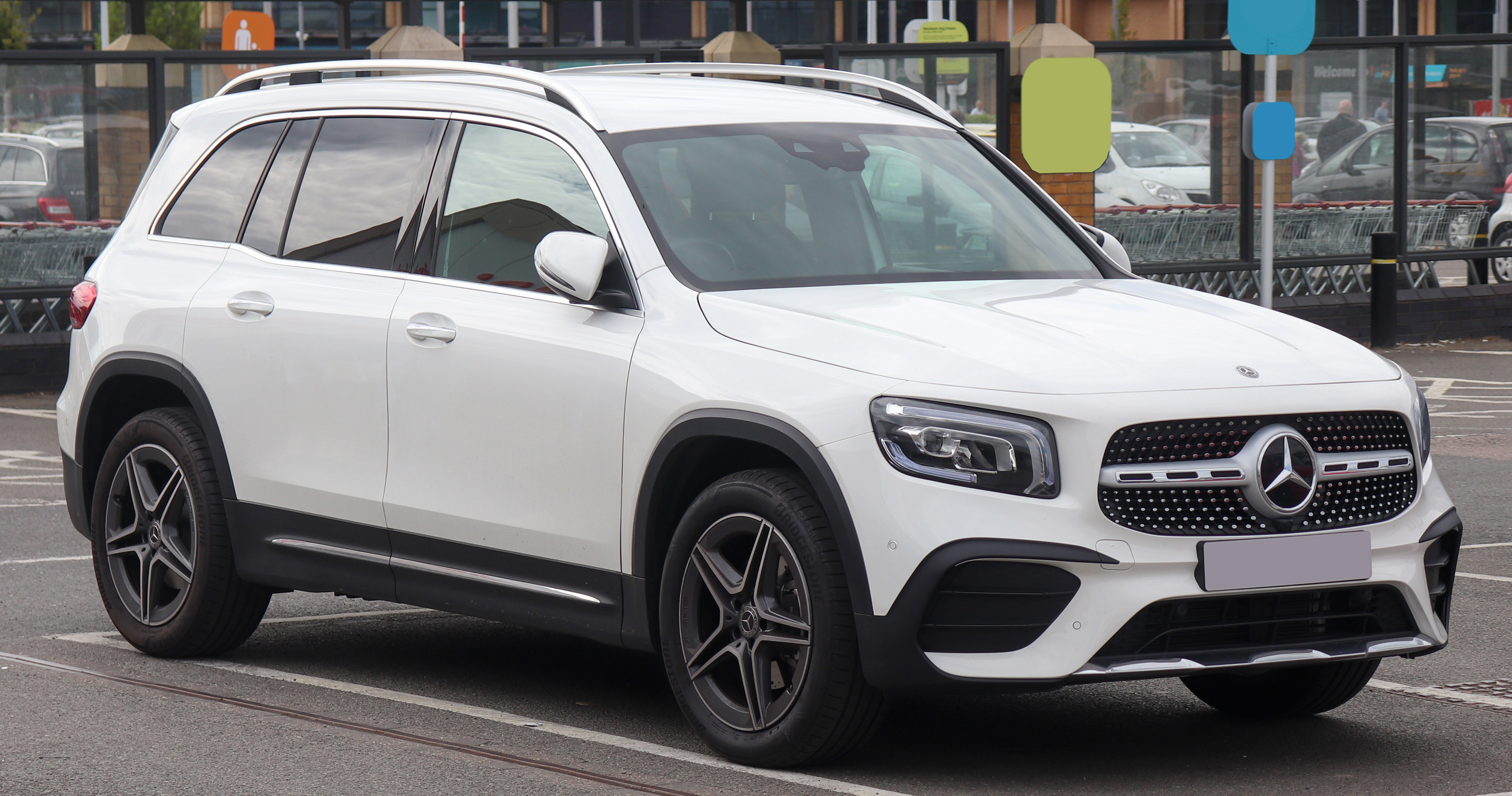
- Mercedes-Benz GLB 200

Overview
- Manufacturer: Daimler AG (2019–2022); Mercedes-Benz Group (2022–present)
- Production: 2019–present
- Model years: 2020–present

Body and chassis
- Class: D-segment crossover
- Body style: 5-door SUV

The Mercedes-Benz GLB is a three-row D-segment luxury crossover SUV produced by Mercedes-Benz. It was unveiled by the German manufacturer Daimler AG on 10 June 2019 in Park City, Utah. It was previously unveiled as a concept car to the public at the Shanghai Auto Show in April 2019.

== First generation (X247; 2019) ==
First generation
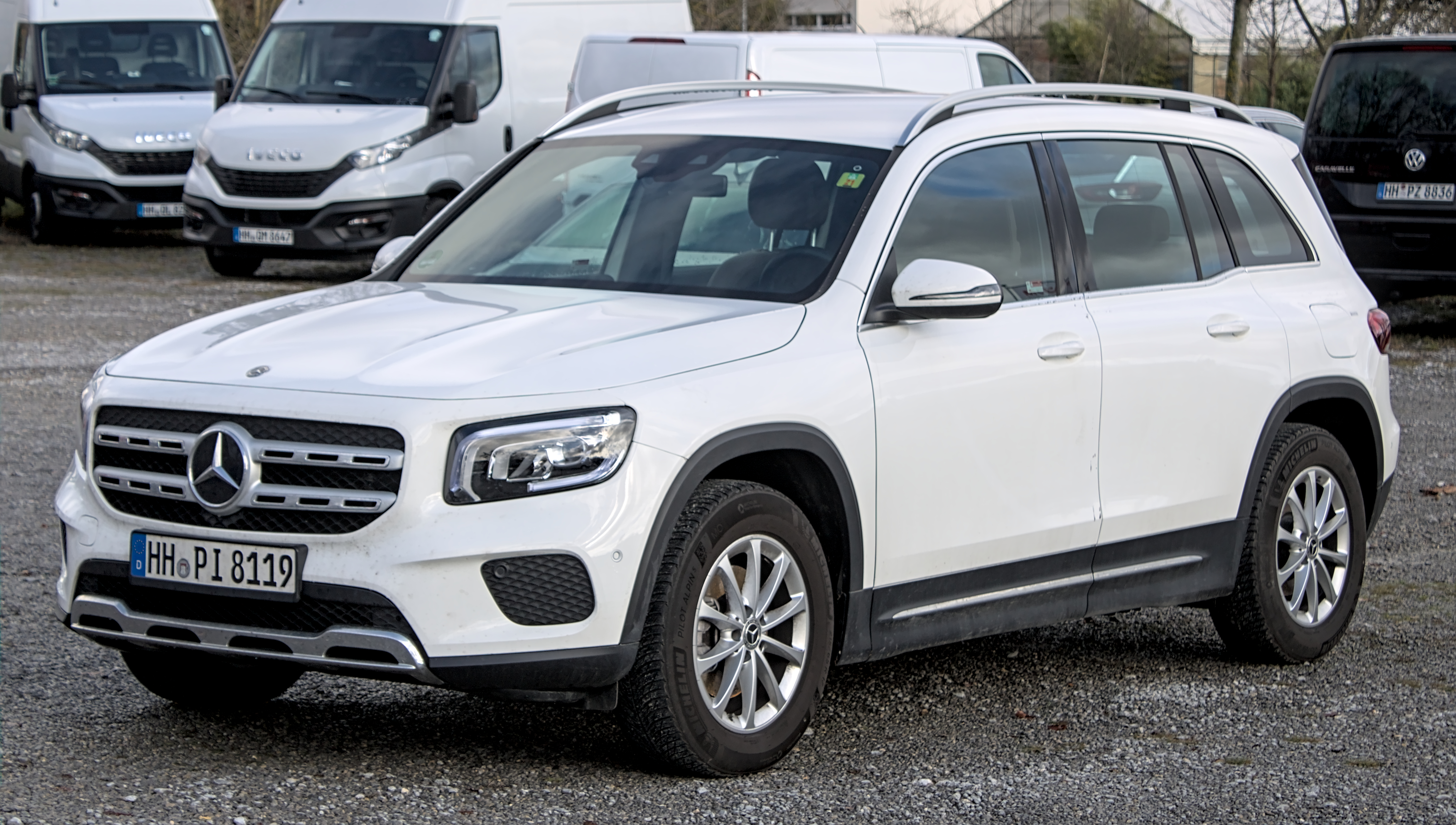
- Mercedes-Benz GLB 180

Overview
- Model code: X247
- Production: July 2019 – 2026
- Model years: 2020–2026
- Assembly: Mexico: Aguascalientes (Cooperation Manufacturing Plant Aguascalientes); Germany: Rastatt; China: Beijing (Beijing Benz)
- Designer: Balázs Filczer

Body and chassis
- Body style: 5-door SUV
- Layout: Front-engine, front-wheel-drive; Front-engine, all-wheel-drive (4Matic)
- Platform: MFA2
- Related: Mercedes-Benz EQB; Mercedes-Benz A-Class (W/V/Z177); Mercedes-Benz B-Class (W247); Mercedes-Benz CLA (C/X118); Mercedes-Benz GLA (H247)

Powertrain
- Engine: Petrol: 1.3 L M282 turbo I4; 2.0 L M260 turbo I4; Diesel: 2.0 L OM 654 turbo I4
- Electric motor: 2x asynchronous electric motors
- Transmission: 7-speed DCT; 8-speed DCT
- Hybrid drivetrain: Mild Hybrid (EQ Boost)

Dimensions
- Wheelbase: 2,829 mm (111.4 in)
- Length: 4,634 mm (182.4 in)
- Width: 1,834 mm (72.2 in)
- Height: 1,658 mm (65.3 in)
- Kerb weight: 1,300–1,445 kg (2,866–3,186 lb)

The GLB is positioned between the GLA and the larger GLC in size, however unlike those vehicles the GLB is equipped with optional third row seating due to better space distribution. The launch date for taking orders began in July 2019. The production commenced at the end of 2019 for the 2020 model year.

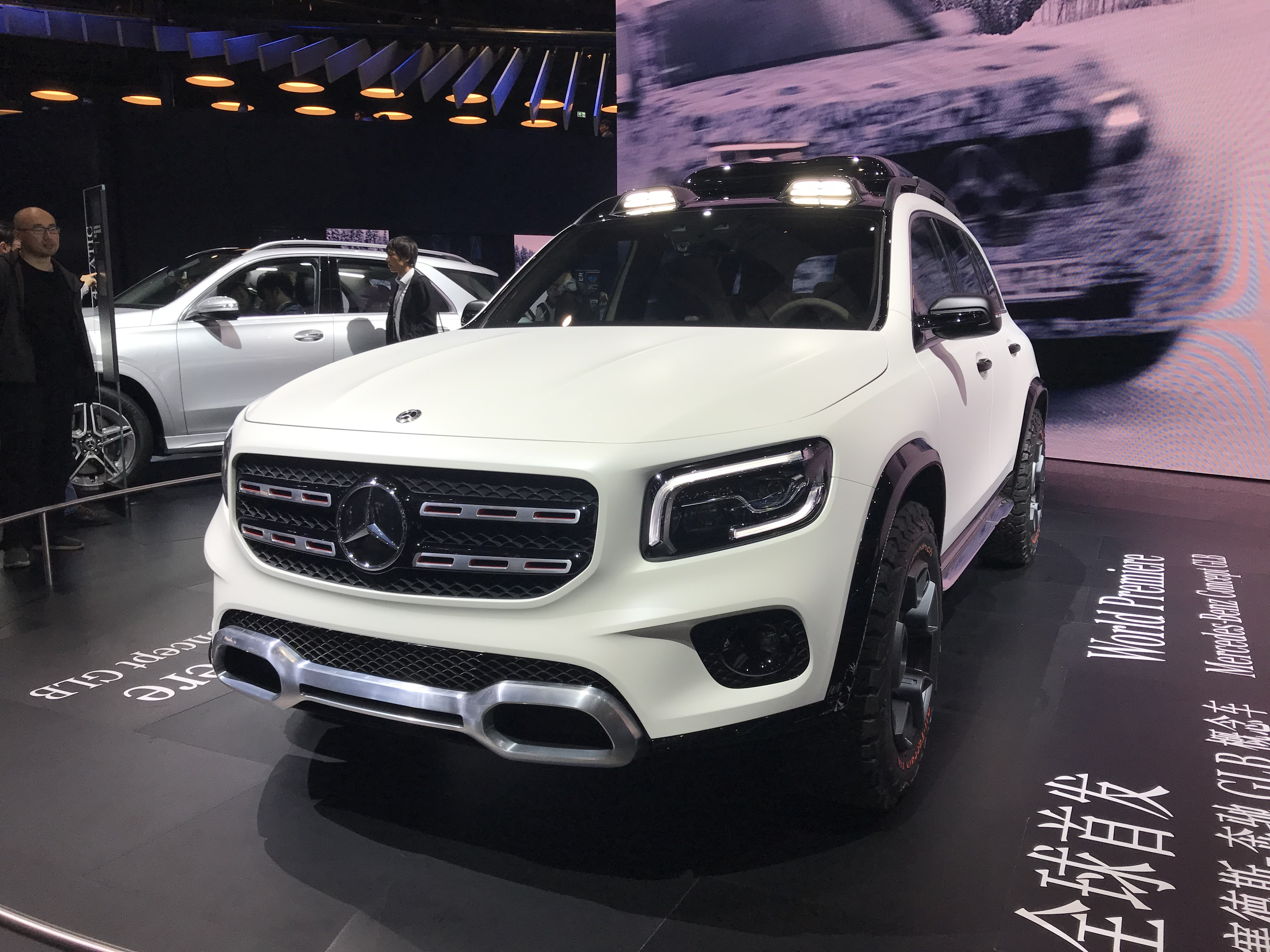
Mercedes-Benz GLB Concept

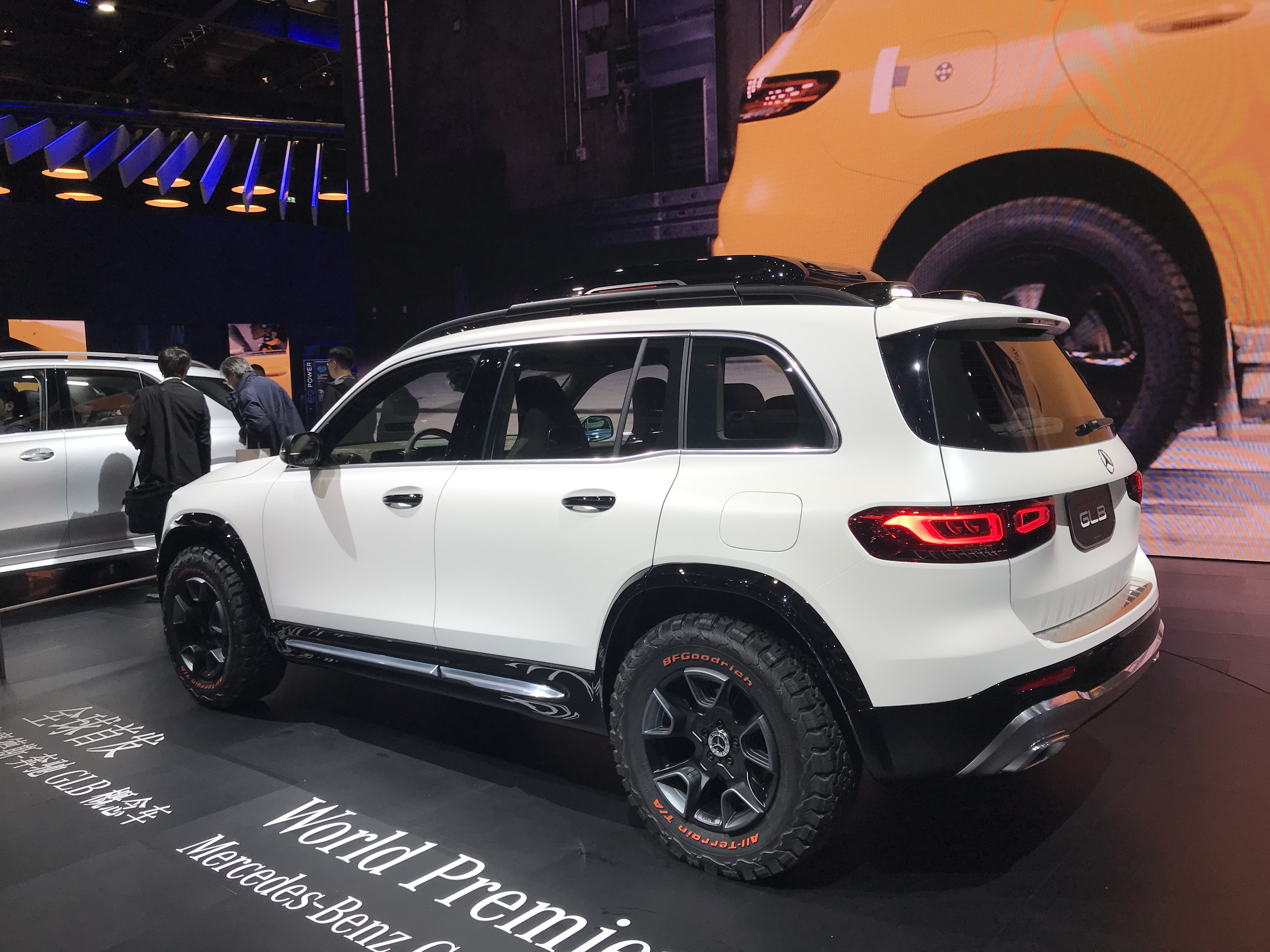
Mercedes-Benz GLB Concept

The GLB uses the same front-wheel-drive MFA2 platform as the W177 A-Class and the H247 GLA, but the wheelbase is 10 cm (3.9 in) longer to give it extra practicality. The result is that at 4.63 m (182.3 in), it is only 22 mm (0.9 in) shorter than a X253 GLC. Mechanically, it has standard all-wheel-drive and an eight-speed dual clutch automatic transmission, and shares its engine lineup with the A-Class.

The model adopts a square, angular style inspired by the larger X167 GLS and the former boxy shaped X204 GLK-Class. It features a MacPherson strut front and multi-link rear suspension with optional adaptive damping. Inside, the widescreen cockpit and the latest version of the MBUX interface is featured.

The Mercedes-AMG GLB 35 4MATIC was announced on 28 August 2019 in time for the 2019 IAA Frankfurt Auto Show. The GLB 35 4MATIC is the first of the 35-series models to have an eight-speed automatic gearbox; other 35-series models (A 35 4MATIC and CLA 35 4MATIC) continue with seven-speed automatic gearboxes. Fitted to GLB 35 4MATIC, the AMG-specific Panamericana Grille is used on the 35-series model for the first time.

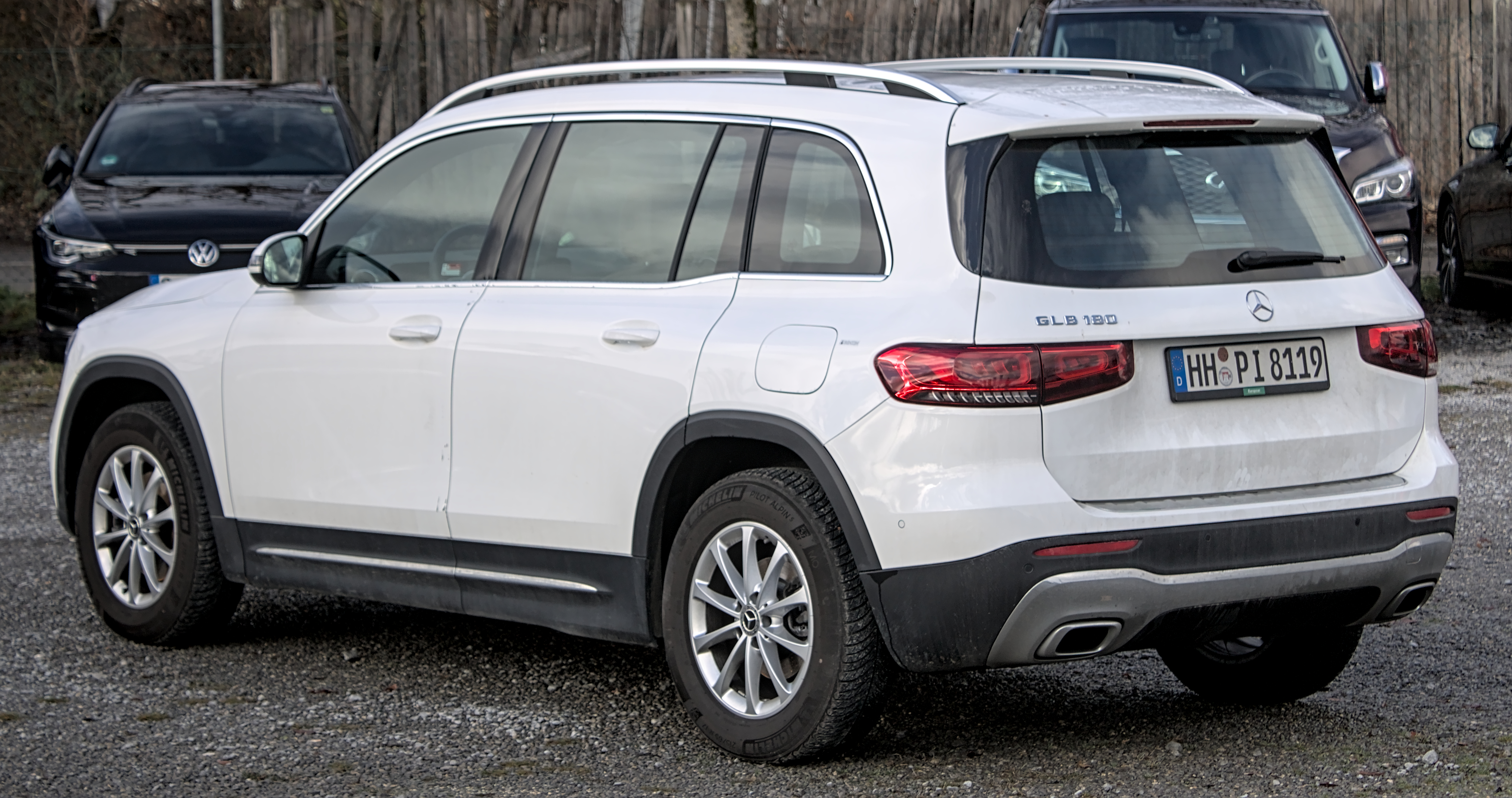
Mercedes-Benz GLB 180

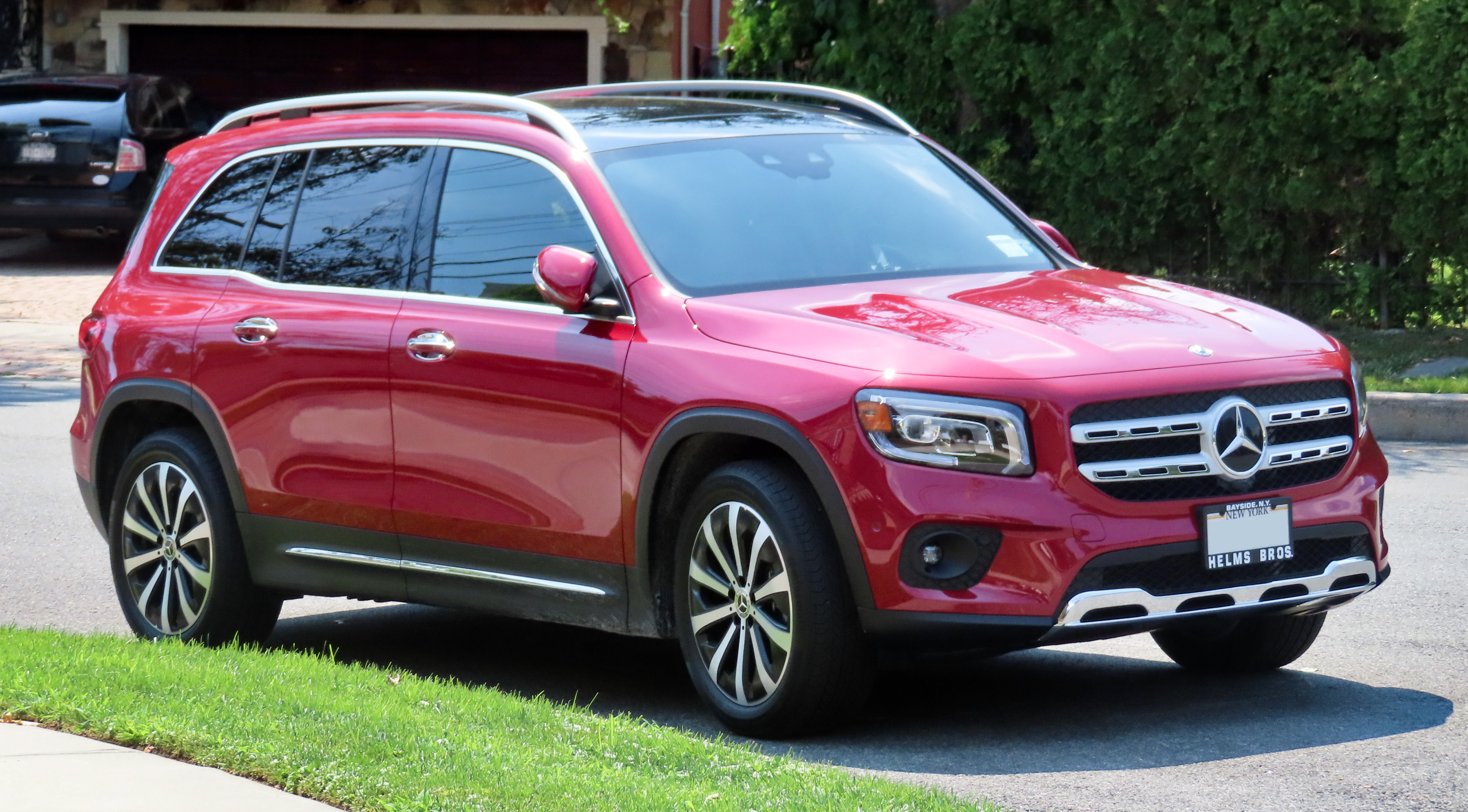
2020 Mercedes-Benz GLB 250 4MATIC (US)

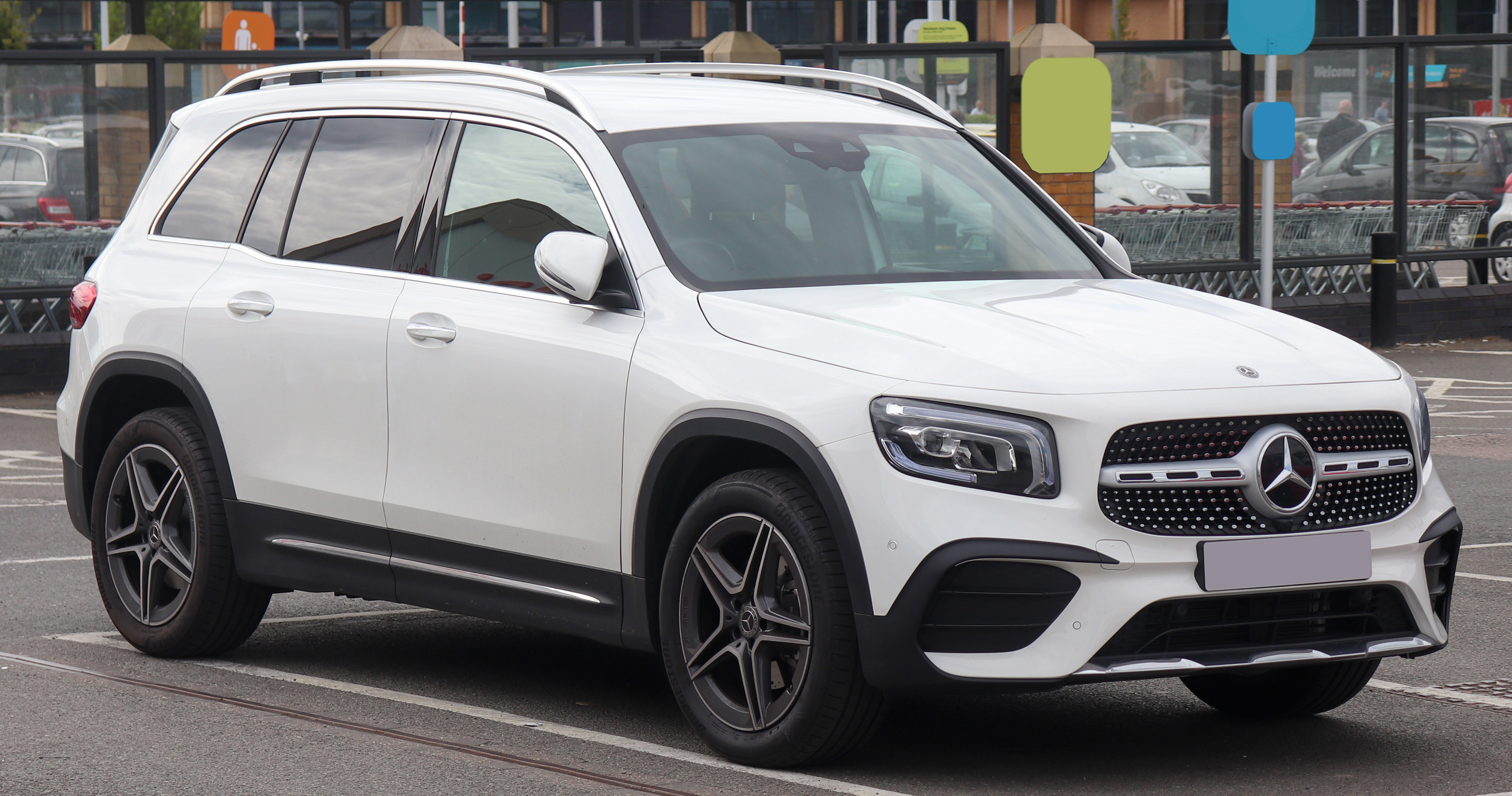
2020 Mercedes-Benz GLB 200d AMG Line

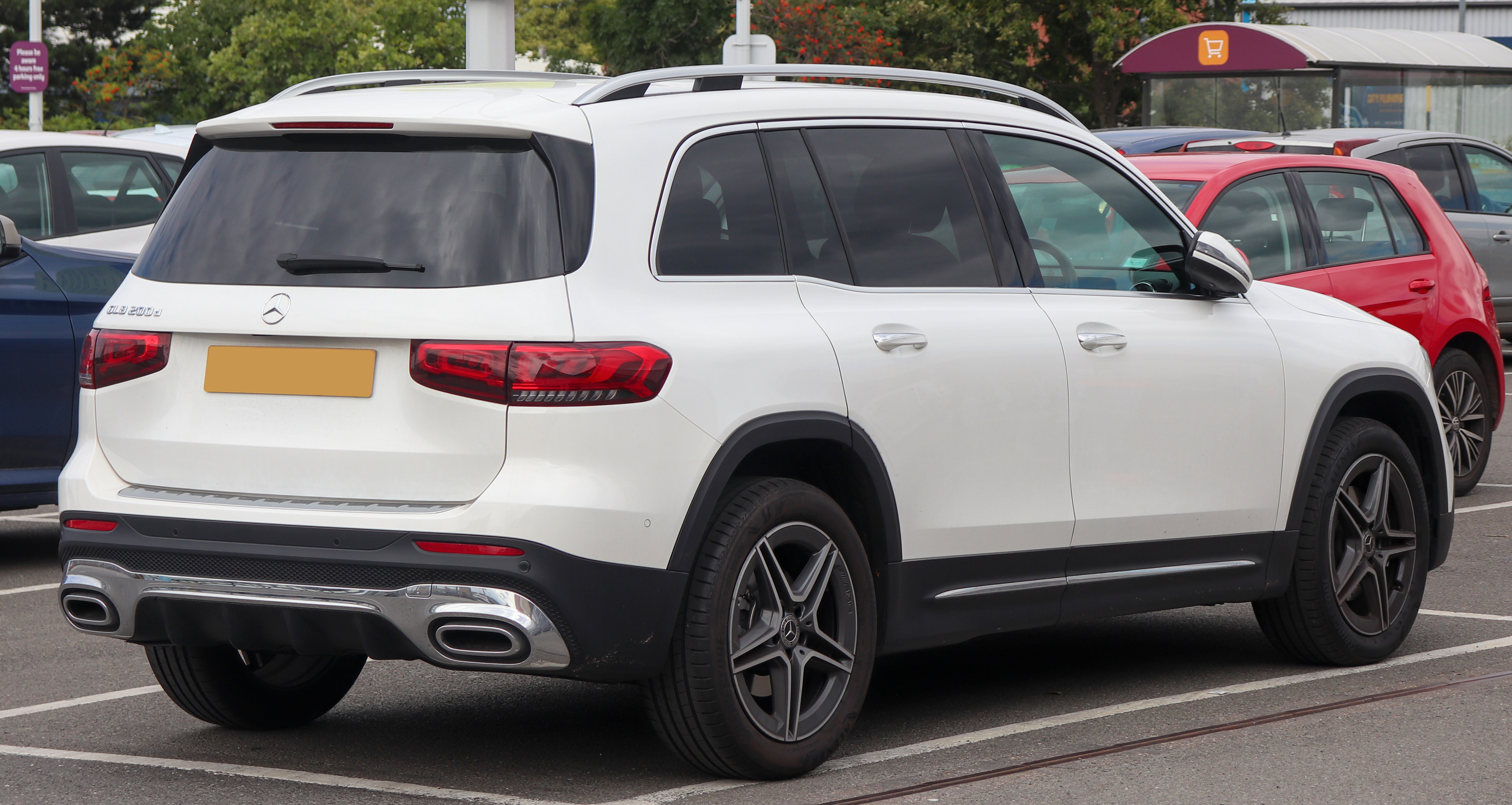
2020 Mercedes-Benz GLB 200d AMG Line

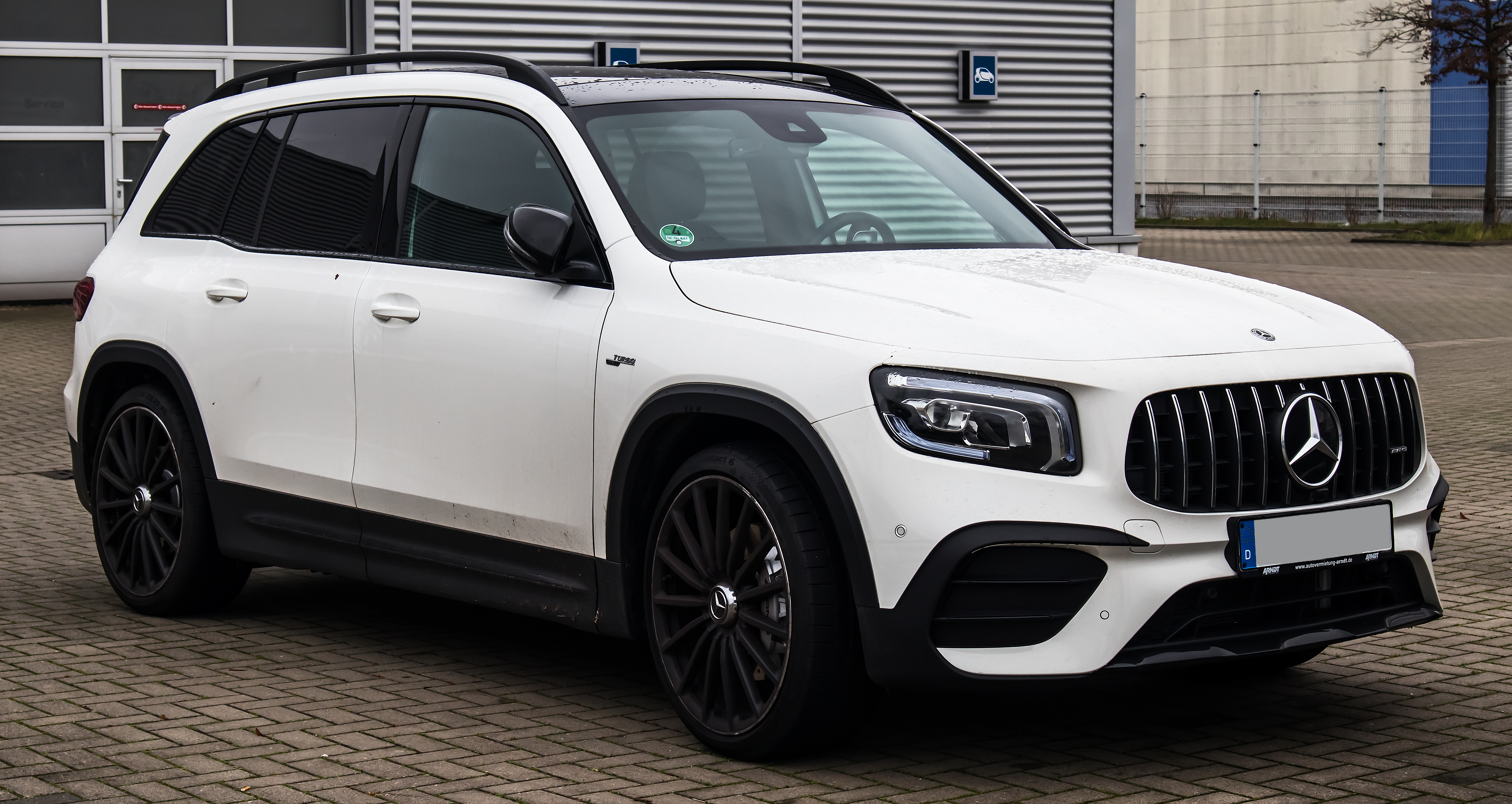
Mercedes-AMG GLB 35 4MATIC

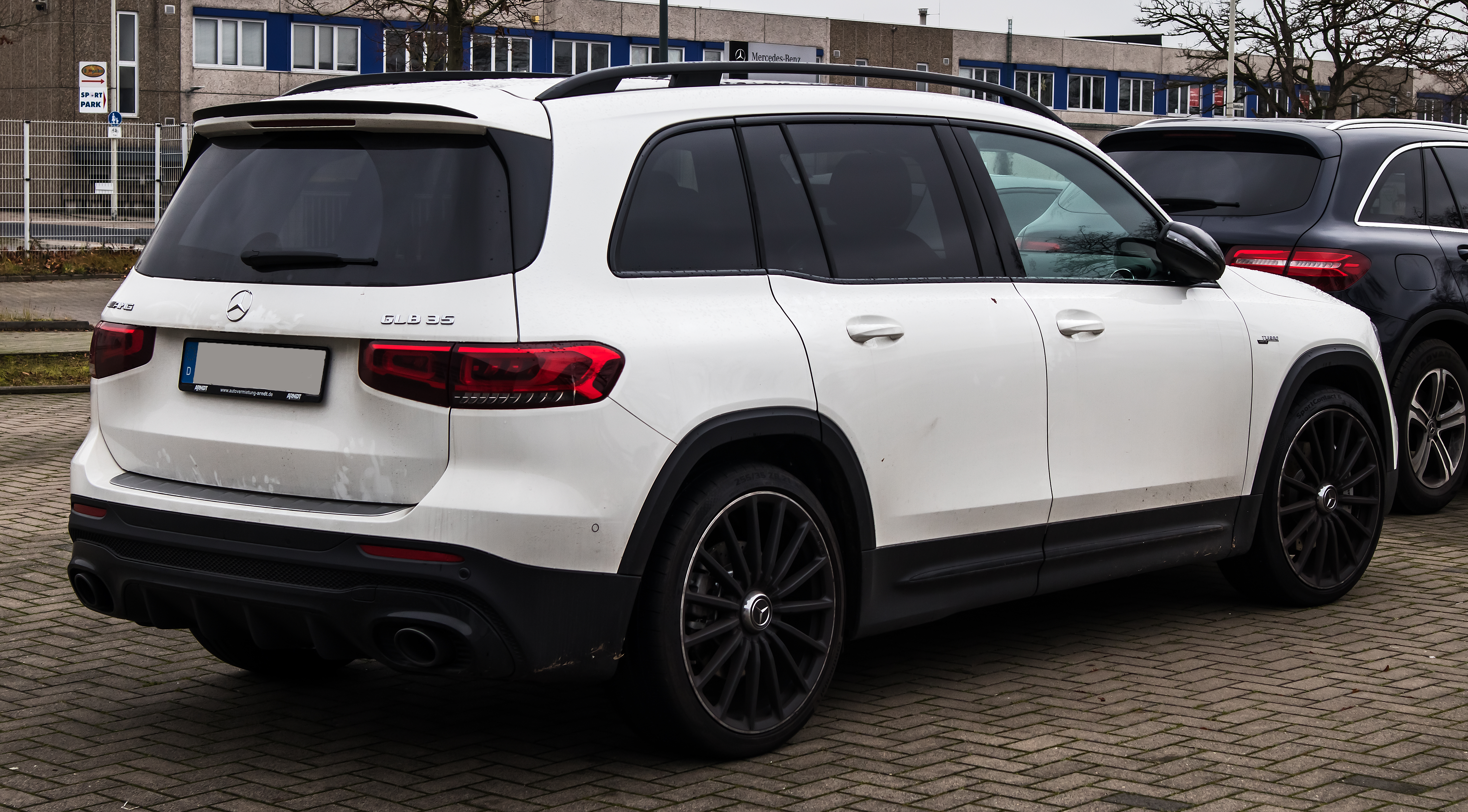
Mercedes-AMG GLB 35 4MATIC

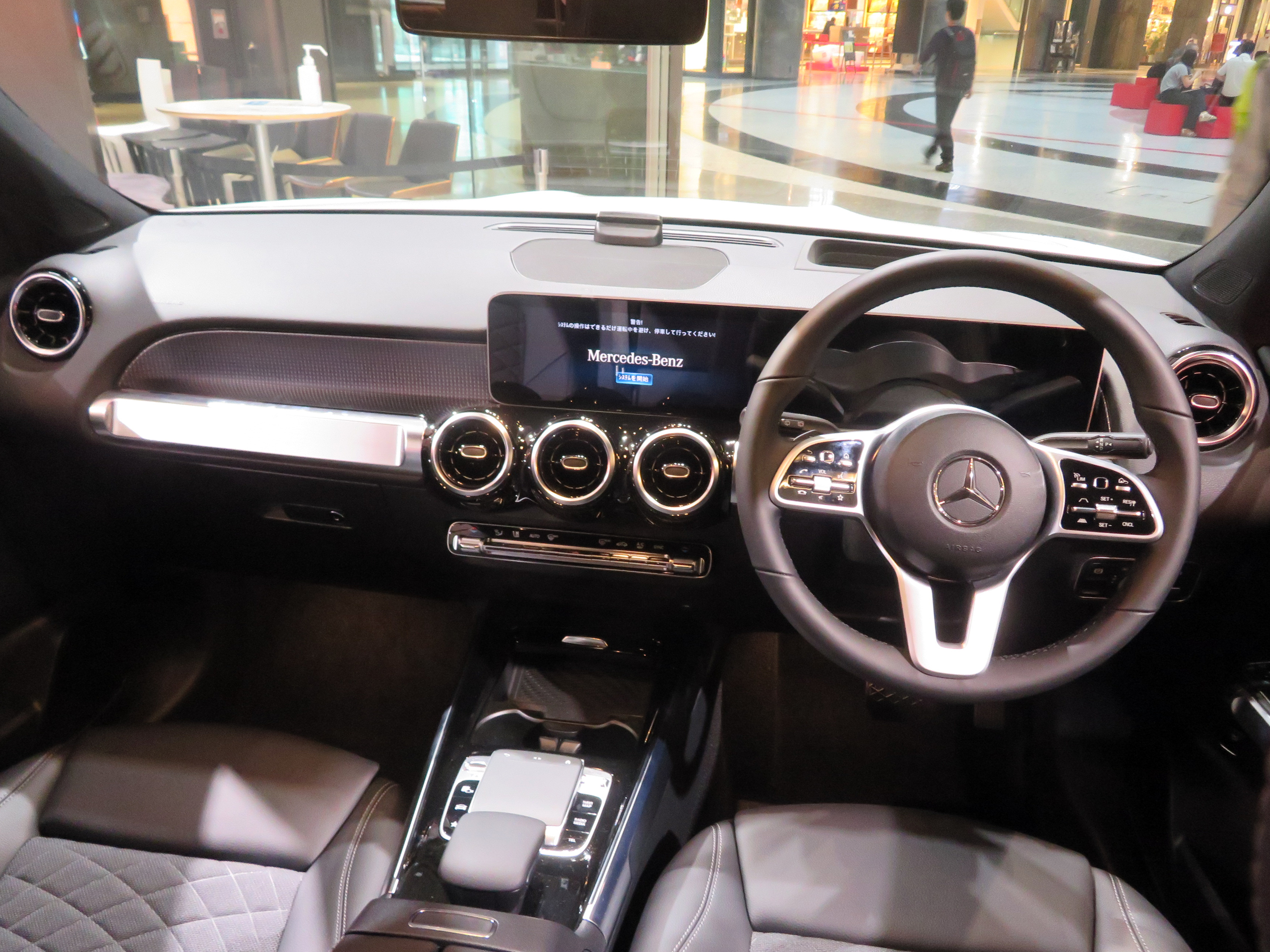
Interior

=== 2023 facelift ===
In 2023 for the 2024 model year, Mercedes implemented a facelift for the GLB, which included primarily new headlights and taillights. It received an updated variant of the MBUX infotainment system and supports Wireless Apple CarPlay and Android Auto. A new colour, known as "Spectral Blue Metallic", as well as eighteen and twenty-inch wheels, are available. The car also has a new 48 volt mild hybrid system named the EQ Boost engine.

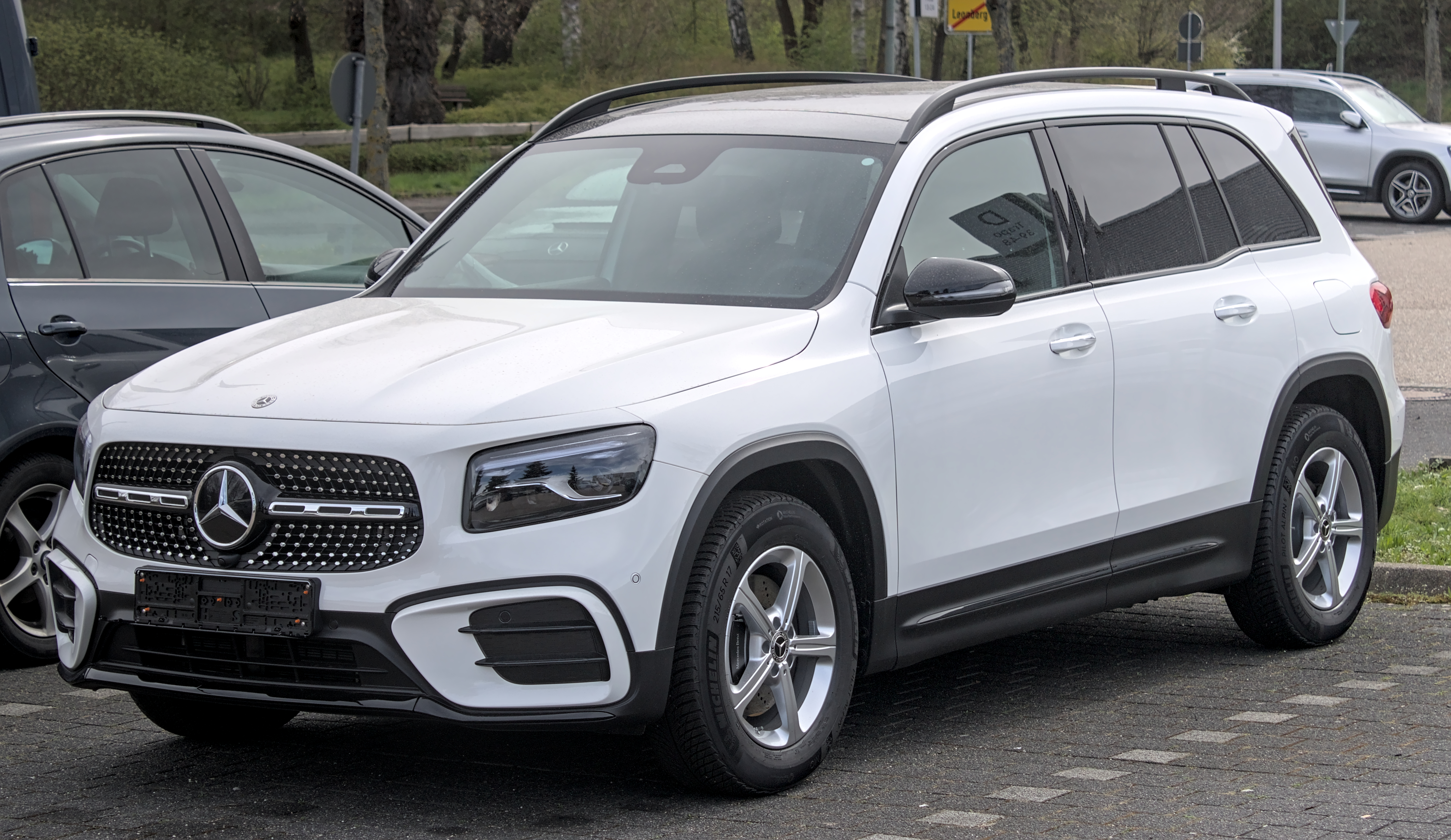
2023 facelift

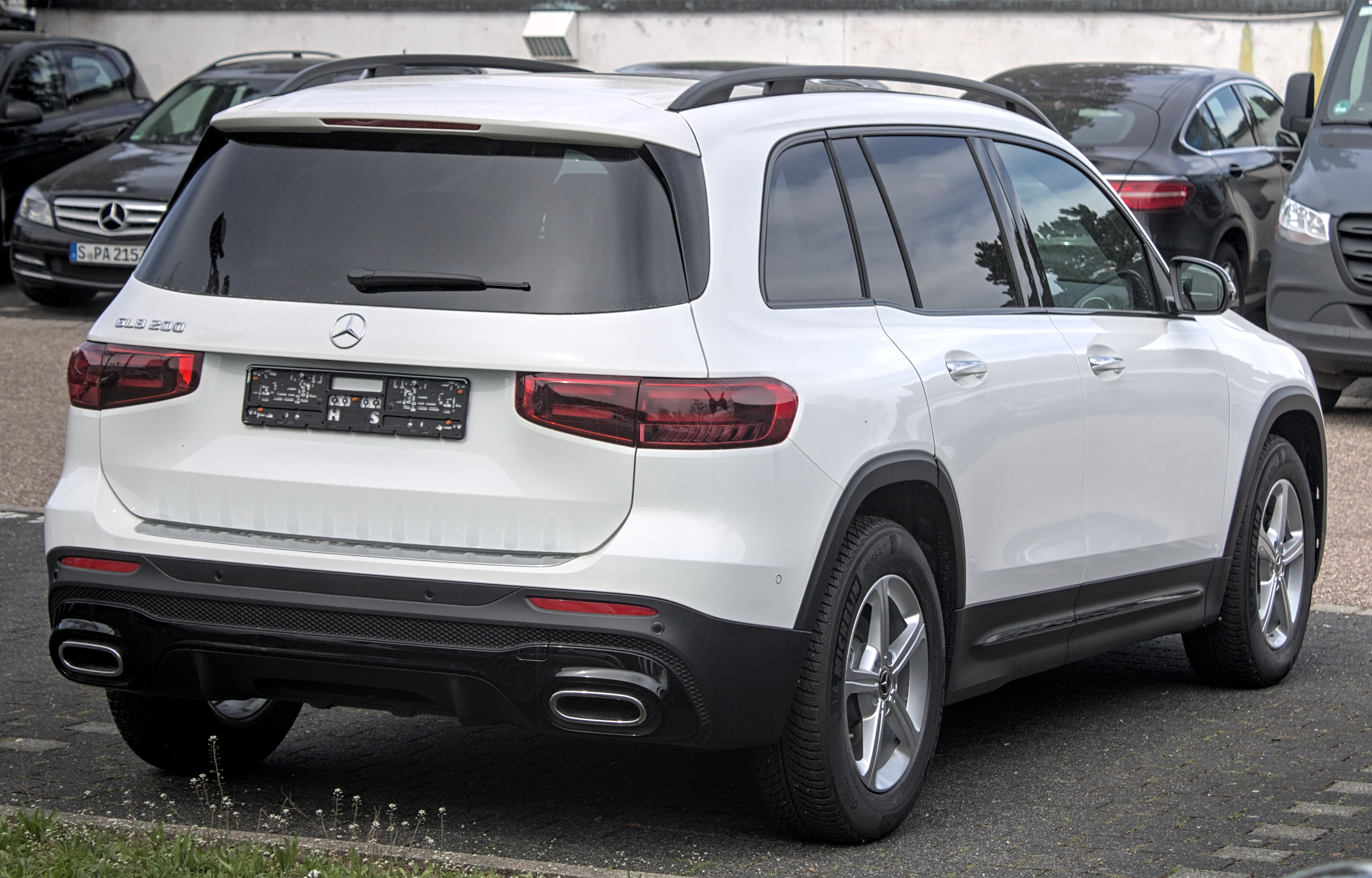
2023 facelift

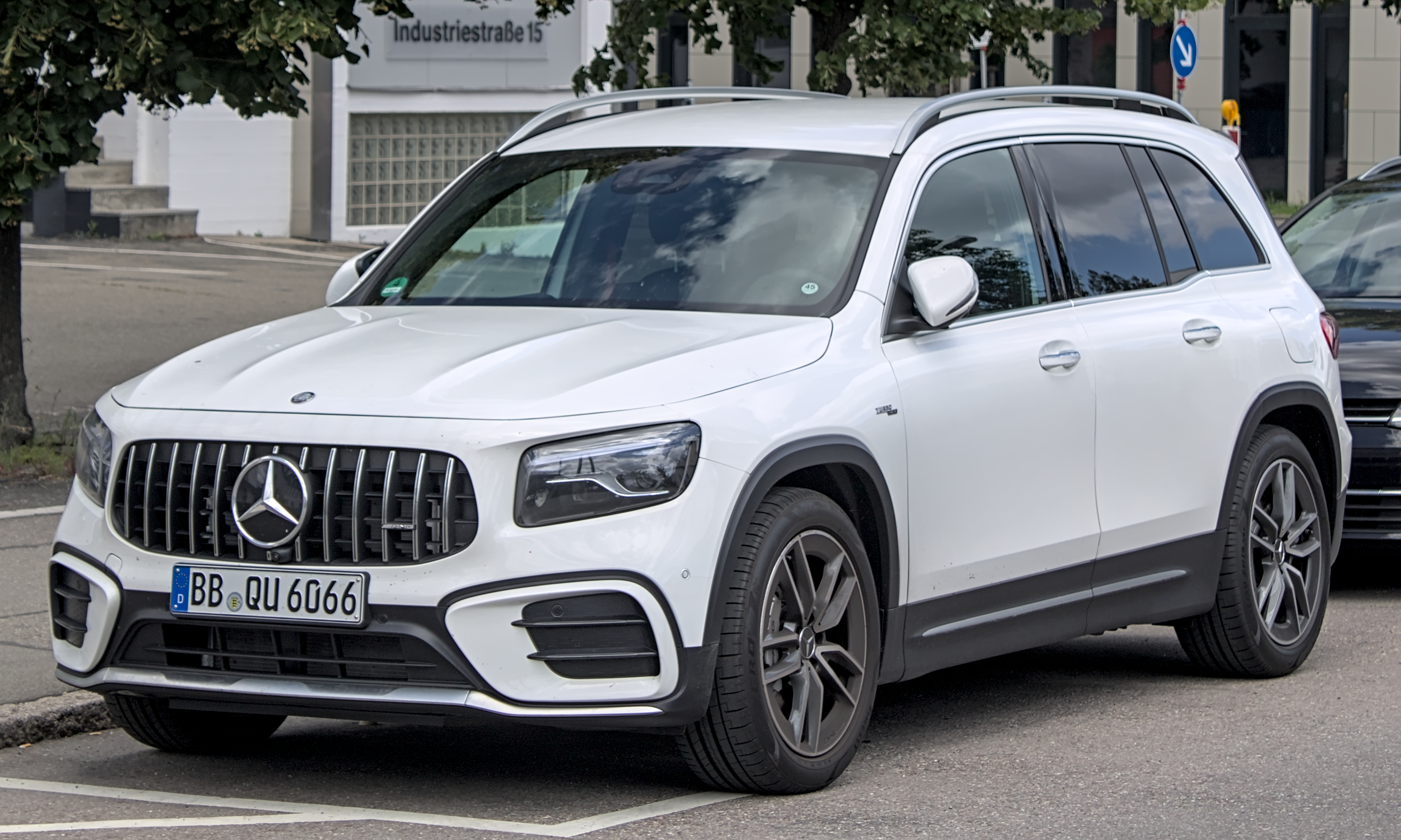
Mercedes-AMG GLB 35 4MATIC (facelift)

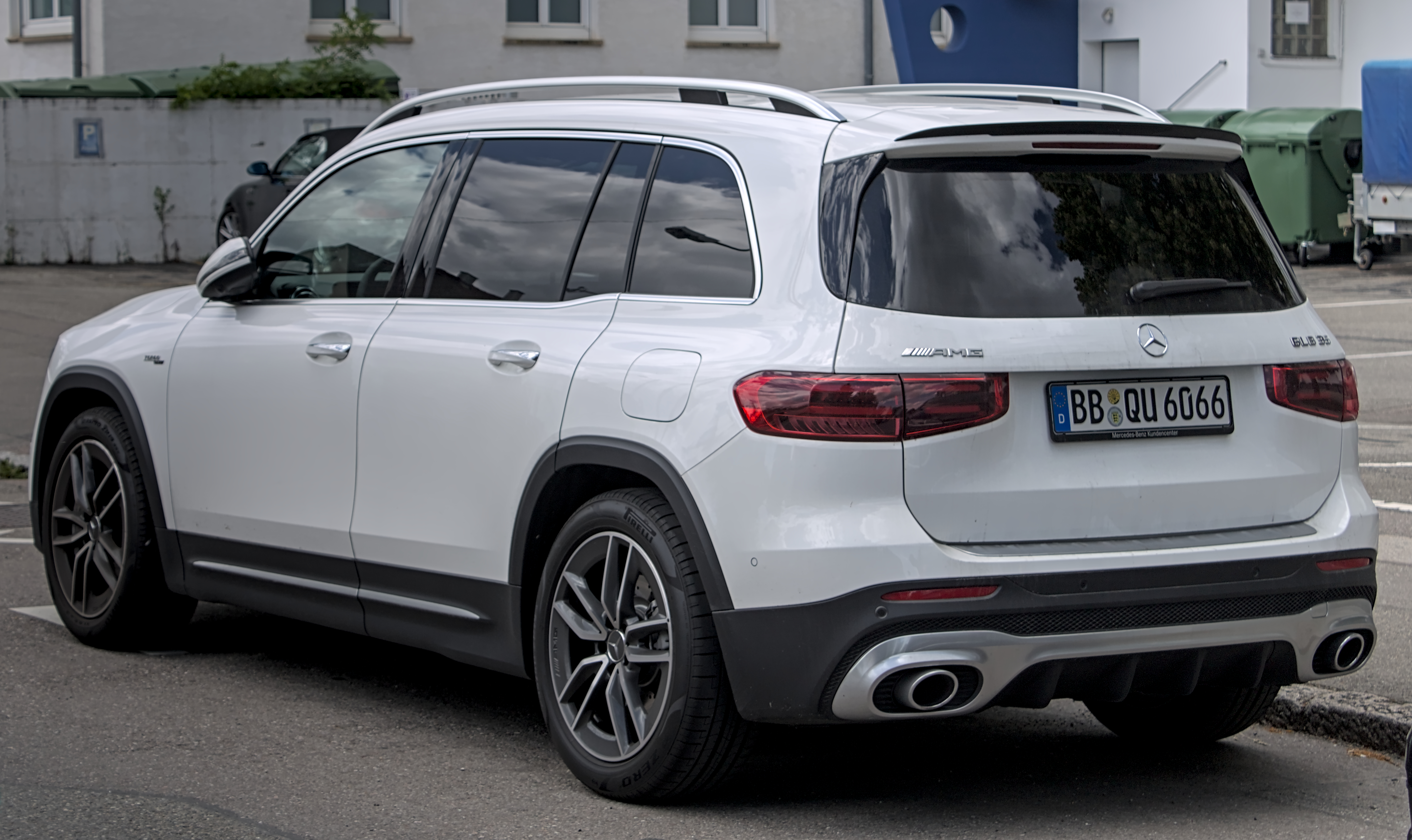
Mercedes-AMG GLB 35 4MATIC (facelift)

=== Technical details ===
It is available with 4-cylinder petrol and diesel engines only, while a plug-in hybrid and a fully electric version, called the EQB, was unveiled in April 2021.

=== Engines ===
At launch, the GLB came with two petrol and two diesel engines. All of them are fitted with automatic transmissions only, while 4MATIC all-wheel-drive system is either available or standard with the 2.0-litre engines, only. Available as of 2020, the 2.0-litre petrol engine in the GLB 35 is tuned to produce 225 kW (306 PS; 302 bhp) and 400 N⋅m (295 lbf⋅ft) of torque.

Diesel engines and the smaller petrol engine were eschewed for the US market, leaving only the 2.0-litre 4-cylinder turbo of the GLB 250 for the debut.

Model	Years	Configuration	Displacement	Power	Torque	0–100 km/h (0–62 mph)	Top Speed	Fuel Consumption/Efficiency (EU-Norm combined)
Petrol Engines
GLB 180	2019–	Inline 4 turbo (M282 DE14 LA)	1,332 cc (81.3 cu in)	100 kW (136 PS; 134 bhp) at 5,500 rpm	200 N⋅m (148 lbf⋅ft) at 1,620-4,000 rpm	9.4 seconds	200 km/h (124 mph)	5.0 L/100 km (47 mpg_{‑US})
GLB 200	2019–	Inline 4 turbo (M282 DE14 LA)	1,332 cc (81.3 cu in)	120 kW (163 PS; 161 bhp) at 5,500 rpm	250 N⋅m (184 lbf⋅ft) at 1,620-4,000 rpm	9.1 seconds	207 km/h (129 mph)	6.0–6.2 L/100 km (39–38 mpg_{‑US})
GLB 250 4MATIC	2019–	Inline 4 turbo (M260 DE20 LA)	1,991 cc (121.5 cu in)	165 kW (224 PS; 221 bhp) at 5,800 rpm	350 N⋅m (258 lbf⋅ft) at 1,800-4,000 rpm	6.9 seconds	236 km/h (147 mph)	7.2–7.4 L/100 km (33–32 mpg_{‑US})
AMG GLB 35 4MATIC	2019–	Inline 4 turbo (M260 DE20 LA)	1,991 cc (121.5 cu in)	225 kW (306 PS; 302 bhp) at 5,800-6,100 rpm	400 N⋅m (295 lbf⋅ft) at 3,000–4,000 rpm	5.2 seconds	250 km/h (155 mph)	7.2–7.4 L/100 km (33–32 mpg_{‑US})
Diesel engines
GLB 180 d	2019–	Inline 4 turbo (OM 654 DE 20)	1,951 cc (119.1 cu in)	85 kW (116 PS; 114 bhp) at 3,400 – 4,440 rpm	280 N⋅m (207 lbf⋅ft) at 1,300 - 2,600 rpm	11.3 seconds	204 km/h (127 mph)	4.9–5.0 L/100 km (48–47 mpg_{‑US})
GLB 200 d	2019–	Inline 4 turbo (OM 654 DE 20)	1,951 cc (119.1 cu in)	110 kW (150 PS; 148 bhp) at 3,400 – 4,440 rpm	320 N⋅m (236 lbf⋅ft) at 1,400 - 2,600 rpm	9.0 seconds	204 km/h (127 mph)	4.9–5.0 L/100 km (48–47 mpg_{‑US})
GLB 200 d 4MATIC	2019–	Inline 4 turbo (OM 654 DE 20)	1,951 cc (119.1 cu in)	110 kW (150 PS; 148 bhp) at 3,400 – 4,440 rpm	320 N⋅m (236 lbf⋅ft) at 1,400 - 2,600 rpm	9.3 seconds	201 km/h (125 mph)	5.2–5.5 L/100 km (45–43 mpg_{‑US})
GLB 220 d 4MATIC	2019–	Inline 4 turbo (OM 654 DE 20)	1,951 cc (119.1 cu in)	140 kW (190 PS; 188 bhp) at 3,800 rpm	400 N⋅m (295 lbf⋅ft) at 1,600 - 2,400 rpm	7.6 seconds	217 km/h (135 mph)	5.2–5.5 L/100 km (45–43 mpg_{‑US})

==== Transmissions ====
Model	Years	Types
GLB 180	2019–	7-speed automatic 7G-DCT
GLB 200	2019–	7-speed automatic 7G-DCT
GLB 200 4MATIC	2021–	8-speed automatic 8G-DCT
GLB 250 4MATIC	2019–	8-speed automatic 8G-DCT
AMG GLB 35 4MATIC	2020–	8-speed automatic AMG SPEEDSHIFT DCT 8G
GLB 180 d	2019–	8-speed automatic 8G-DCT
GLB 200 d	2019–	8-speed automatic 8G-DCT
GLB 200 d 4MATIC	2019–	8-speed automatic 8G-DCT
GLB 220 d	2021–	8-speed automatic 8G-DCT
GLB 220 d 4MATIC	2019–	8-speed automatic 8G-DCT

=== Safety ===
==== ANCAP ====
ANCAP test results* Mercedes-Benz GLB 200 & GLB 250 variants (2019, aligned with Euro NCAP)
Test	Points	%
Overall:	5 /5 stars	
Adult occupant:	35.1	92%
Child occupant:	43.3	88%
Pedestrian:	37.5	78%
Safety assist:	9.9	76%

==== Euro NCAP ====
Euro NCAP test results* Mercedes-Benz GLB 200 AMG Line (LHD) (2019)
Test	Points	%
Overall:	5 /5 stars	
Adult occupant:	35.2	92%
Child occupant:	43.4	88%
Pedestrian:	37.5	78%
Safety assist:	9.7	74%

== Second generation (X248/244; 2026) ==
Second generation
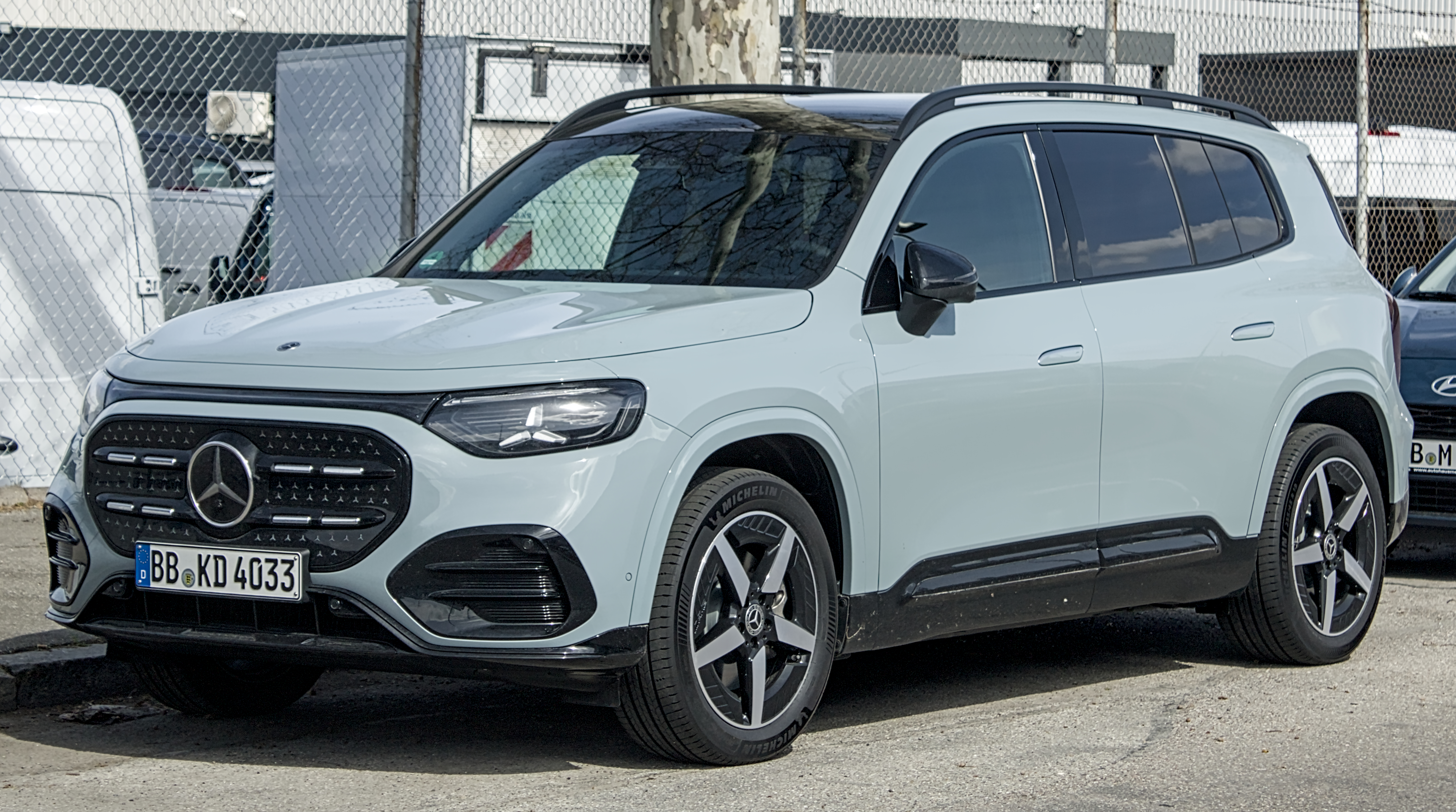
- Mercedes-Benz GLB 250+

Overview
- Model code: X248; X244 (EV)
- Production: January 2026 – present
- Assembly: Hungary: Kecskemét (Mercedes-Benz Manufacturing Hungary)
- Designer: Michael Han

Body and chassis
- Layout: Front-engine, front-wheel-drive (hybrid); Front-engine, all-wheel-drive (hybrid, 4matic); Rear-motor, rear-wheel-drive (EV); Dual-motor, all-wheel-drive (EV, 4matic)
- Platform: Mercedes-Benz Modular Architecture (MMA)
- Related: Mercedes-Benz GLA Electric; Mercedes-Benz CLA (C174/178)

Powertrain
- Engine: 1.5L M252 turbo I4 (hybrid)
- Electric motor: 27 PS (20 kW; 27 hp) permanent-magnet motor (hybrid); 1x or 2x Permanent magnet AC synchronous (EV)
- Power output: 116–157 kW (156–211 hp; 158–213 PS) (hybrid, FWD); 137–157 kW (184–211 hp; 186–213 PS) (hybrid, AWD); 200 kW (268 hp; 272 PS) (EV, RWD); 260 kW (349 hp; 354 PS) (EV, AWD)
- Transmission: 8-speed dual-clutch (hybrid); 2-speed automatic (EV)
- Hybrid drivetrain: High-tech Hybrid
- Battery: Lithium-ion: 1.3 kWh 48V (hybrid); 58.0 kWh LFP (EV); 85.0 kWh Li-NMC (EV)
- Plug-in charging: 320 kW (DC)

Dimensions
- Wheelbase: 2,890 mm (113.8 in)
- Length: 4,730 mm (186.2 in)
- Width: 1,860 mm (73.2 in)
- Height: 1,690 mm (66.5 in)
- Kerb weight: 2,125–2,205 kg (4,685–4,861 lb)

Chronology
- Predecessor: Mercedes-Benz EQB (GLB with EQ Technology)

The second-generation GLB was unveiled on 7 December 2025 with both mild hybrid and battery-electric versions. Unlike the previous generation which put the battery-electric version under the EQB nomenclature, it is now known as the GLB with EQ technology.

The battery-electric version will be launched first with two powertrain options - the GLB 250+ with EQ technology and the GLB 350 4Matic with EQ technology. The mild hybrid and an entry-level battery-electric version are set to arrive in 2026.

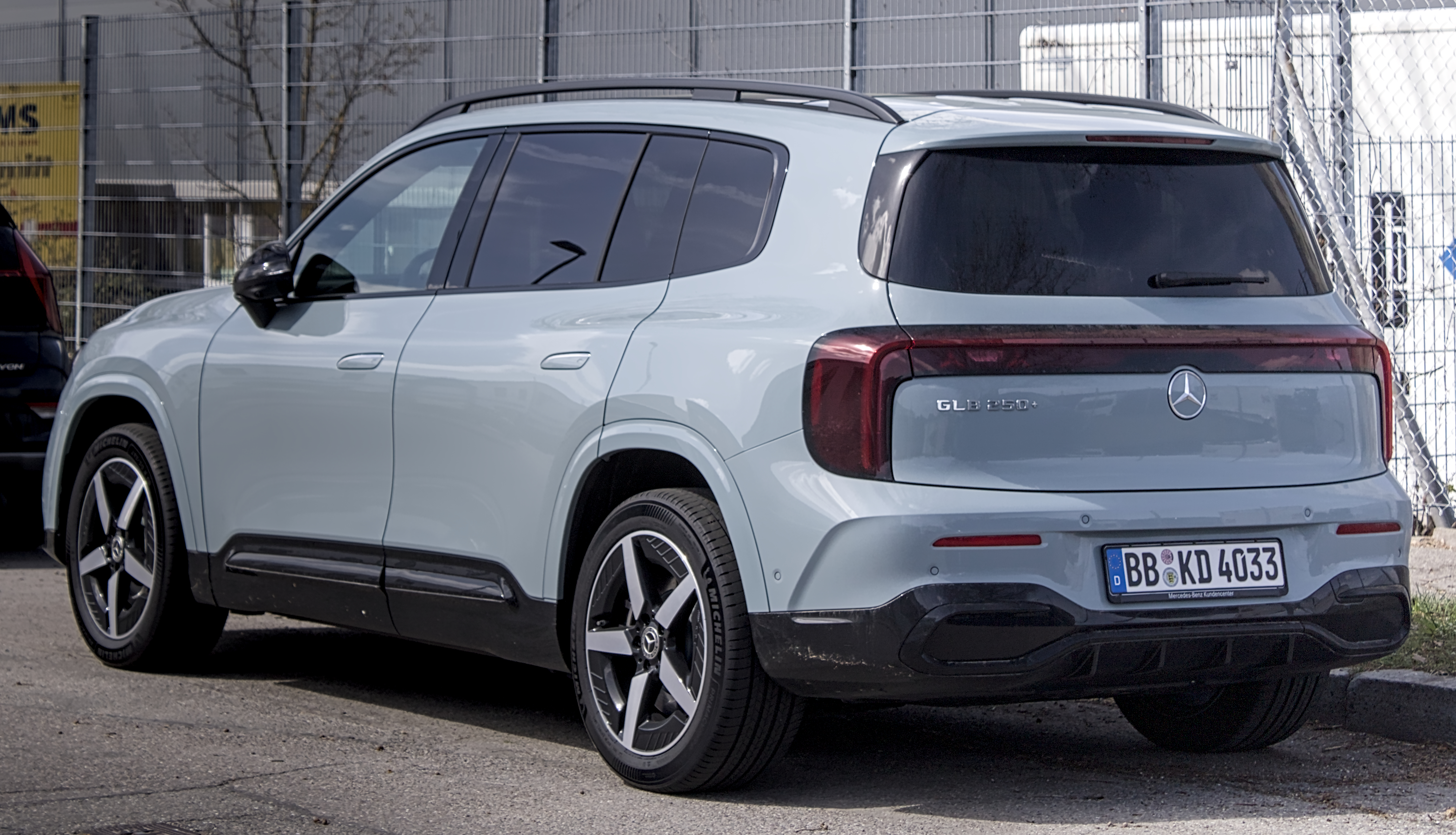
2026 Mercedes-Benz GLB 250+ (rear view)

Interior

== Sales ==
Year	Europe	U.S.	China
2019	149	1,173	3,985
2020	27,223	18,709	59,500
2021	34,628	26,667	53,809
2022		23,274	
2023		16,521	71,978
2024		14,859	50,138
2025			36,284
