= Mercedes-Benz MFA platform =

Automobile platform

Mercedes-Benz MFA

Overview
- Manufacturer: Daimler AG
- Production: 2011–2019
- Assembly: Germany: Rastatt; Hungary: Kecskemét

Body and chassis
- Class: Subcompact executive (B), compact luxury crossover (C)
- Layout: Front-engine, front-wheel-drive, front-engine, all-wheel-drive
- Vehicles: Mercedes-Benz A-Class (W176); Mercedes-Benz B-Class (W246); Mercedes-Benz GLA (X156); Mercedes-Benz CLA (C117); Infiniti Q30/QX30

Dimensions
- Wheelbase: 2,728–2,830 mm (107.4–111.4 in)

Chronology
- Successor: Mercedes-Benz MFA2 platform

The Mercedes-Benz MFA platform (Modular Front-Drive Architecture) is a car platform that was produced by German automotive company Daimler AG. Intended for subcompact front-engine, front- and four-wheel drive applications, the first generation was produced from 2012 to 2019. An evolution of the platform, MFA2, has been in production since 2018. The first iteration of the platform was also shared by Japanese automaker Infiniti from 2016 to 2019.

== Background ==
At the 2011 Geneva International Motor Show, Mercedes-Benz announced its intention to streamline the brand's car platforms, reducing the current nine platforms in production to just three, with the goal to create a more modular approach towards manufacturing. Thomas Weber, then-Mercedes-Benz Group board member in charge of car development, stated that economies of scale was another factor in streamlining the platforms, saying that once implemented he expected the platforms to save the company "billions of dollars".

Alongside the announcement of the strategy was also the revelation by then-CEO of Daimler Dieter Zetsche that the same front-wheel-drive platform would also likely serve as the chassis upon which a compact Infiniti hatchback sat. Confirmation by then-Renault-Nissan CEO Carlos Ghosn was given with the revelation of the Infiniti Etherea concept at the 2011 Frankfurt Auto Show. The production iteration of the Etherea was shown at the 2013 Frankfurt Auto Show to be the Infiniti Q30. Dieter, speaking with Autocar in 2014, stated that much of the development of the Q30 was done by Mercedes, despite Zetsche's insistence in 2011 that both cars would have unique identities.

== First generation (2011–2019) ==
The first generation of the MFA platform was introduced with the presentation of the second generation of the Mercedes-Benz B-Class, the W246, at the 2011 Frankfurt Auto Show. Plans for other models such as the A-Class to sit on the MFA platform were also announced at Frankfurt. The engine options ranged from a 1.5 L (91.5 cu in) turbocharged petrol inline-four to a larger, 2.1 L (128.1 cu in) turbocharged diesel engine. As part of the strategic partnership signed in 2010 with Renault–Nissan, a Renault 1.5 L (91.5 cu in) turbocharged diesel engine was also offered. As part of an expected increase in demand, Mercedes also invested significantly into its Rastatt and Kecskemét manufacturing plants in order to cope.

Deliveries for European models began in November 2011 and North American deliveries began in 2013. However, the U.S. only received the electrified version of the B-Class, whilst Canada received internal combustion engine-powered models.

== Second generation (2018–present) ==
Mercedes-Benz MFA2

Overview
- Manufacturer: Mercedes-Benz Group AG
- Production: 2018–present

Body and chassis
- Class: Subcompact executive, compact luxury crossover
- Layout: Front-engine, front-wheel-drive, front-engine, all-wheel-drive, dual-motor, four-wheel-drive layout
- Vehicles: Mercedes-Benz A-Class (W177); Mercedes-Benz B-Class (W247); Mercedes-Benz GLA (H247); Mercedes-Benz EQA (H243); Mercedes-Benz EQB (X243); Mercedes-Benz GLB (X247); Mercedes-Benz CLA (C118)

Chronology
- Successor: Mercedes-Benz MMA platform

The second generation of the MFA platform premiered in the fourth and current generation of the Mercedes-Benz A-Class, the W177, a concept version of which was shown at the 2017 Shanghai Auto Show. Several models were harmonised to have the same wheelbase, with the A-, GLA-, and CLA-Class now sharing a wheelbase of 2,729 mm (107.4 in).

The platform was expected to remain in production until at least 2025. Mercedes-Benz replaced the MFA2 platform with the Mercedes-Benz Modular Architecture (MMA) platform, starting with the 2025 CLA, alongside the halting of A- and B-Class production. Other cars which used the MFA2 such as the GLA, and GLB are expected to receive the MMA platform in their new generations.
