= Cooperation Manufacturing Plant Aguascalientes =

Mexican automobile plant

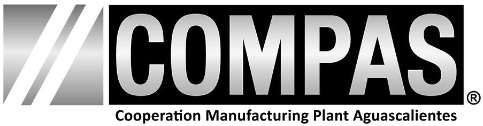
- Type: Joint venture
- Industry: Automotive
- Founded: March 31, 2014; 12 years ago
- Defunct: May 31, 2026; 3 months ago
- Headquarters: Aguascalientes, Mexico
- Products: Automobiles
- Production output: 90,408 (2019)
- Owner: Mercedes-Benz Group (50%); Nissan (50%)
- Number of employees: 3,600

Cooperation Manufacturing Plant Aguascalientes (COMPAS) was a joint venture manufacturing plant between Mercedes-Benz Group and Nissan based in Aguascalientes, Mexico. The factory was announced in July 2015 as a strategic alliance between the two companies. Both companies invested a total of $1 billion for construction and operation of the manufacturing plant. The production site is located near the Nissan Aguascalientes A2 plant.

At the time of its establishment, the plant was targeted to have an initial annual production capacity of more than 230,000 vehicles and was to create about 3,600 direct jobs by 2020. Production of Infiniti vehicles began in 2017, while the first Mercedes-Benz model, the A-Class, rolled off the line in September 2018.

The A-Class production at the plant ceased in 2020 to focus on the Mercedes-Benz GLB, caused by the market demand shifting from sedans towards SUVs.

== Production ==
=== Former models ===
- Infiniti QX50 (November 2017 – 2025)
- Infiniti QX55 (2021–2025)
- Mercedes-Benz A-Class (September 2018 – 2020)
- Mercedes-Benz GLB (July 2019 – 2026)
