= 4Matic =

All-wheel-drivetrain developed by Mercedes-Benz

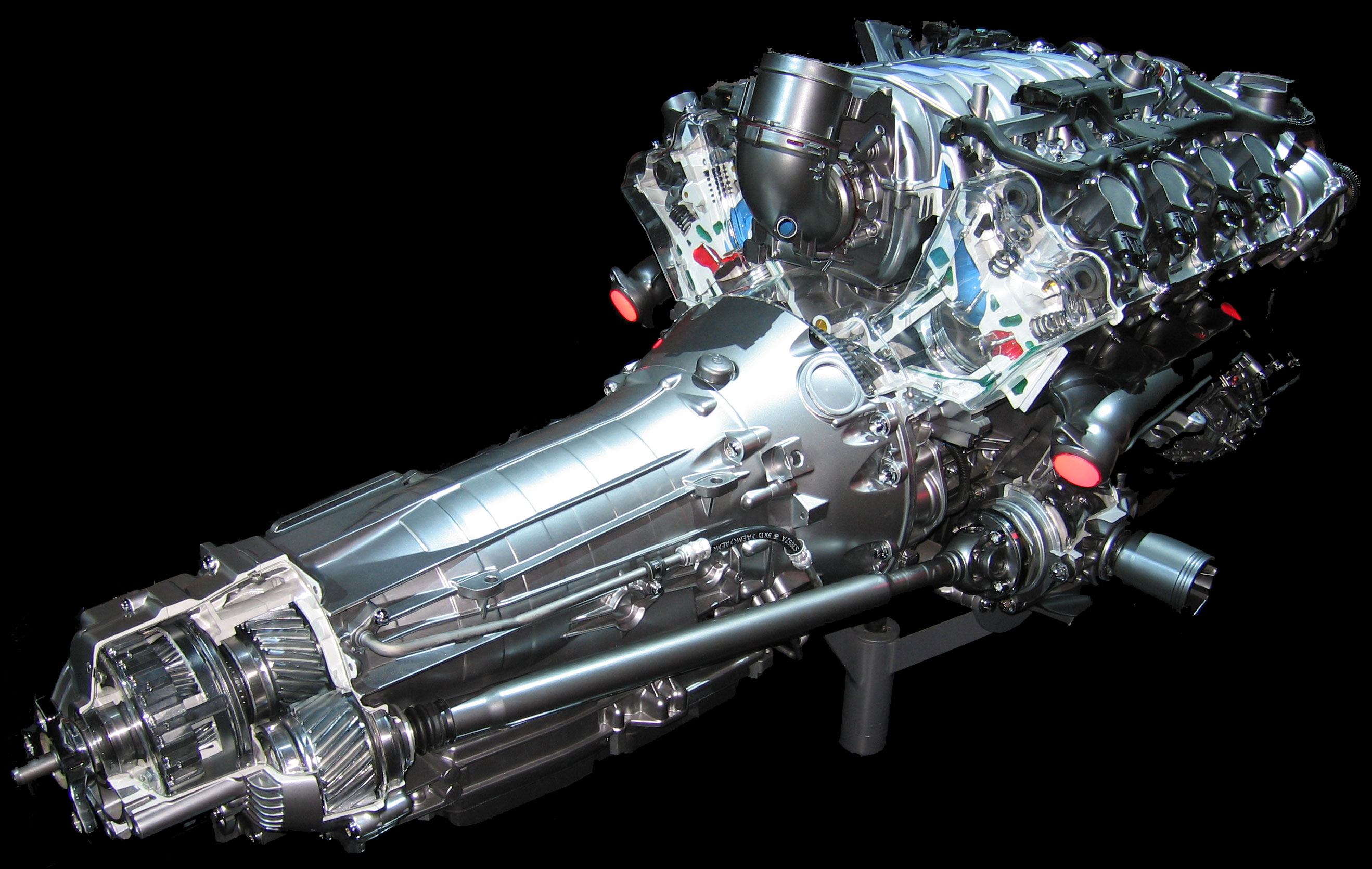
4Matic gearbox and a V8 engine

4Matic (stylized in all caps as 4MATIC) is the marketing name of an all-wheel drive system developed by Mercedes-Benz since 1987.

== Description ==
The four-wheel-drive system was developed in conjunction with Steyr-Daimler-Puch (currently Magna Steyr), who manufactured the Mercedes-Benz G-Class in Austria.

Nearly all Mercedes-Benz vehicles that feature this system are paired with an automatic transmission as the default transmission. The first design of 4Matic system was introduced in 1987 on the W124 series (E Class) saloons (sedan) and estate (station wagon) cars. It was available with the 2.6 L and 3.0 L 6-cylinder petrol (gasoline) and diesel engines.

=== First generation ===
The first generation 4Matic system was originally a complex electronically controlled system with automatically engaging four-wheel drive (4WD), the system employing locking central and rear differentials to provide additional traction in slippery conditions. The centre differential, also known as the transfer case, contains two clutches. Each hydraulically enabled clutch is controlled separately to allow for three modes of operation: 2WD (mode 0) where 100% of available torque is available to the rear axle while the front axle is disconnected, and two 4WD modes which allow for 35/65 front/rear axle torque split (mode 1) or 50/50 front/rear axle torque split (mode 2). The rear differential lock, previously known as ASD on Mercedes-Benz models, can also be locked (mode 3) if rear wheel slip is still present when the transfer case 50/50 4WD mode 2 is engaged. Due to safety and stability concerns there is no front differential lock. The 4Matic system uses inputs from the three channel ABS system and a steering wheel angle sensor to decide when to intervene. 4WD is disengaged automatically if the ABS service brakes are applied. Engine throttle control is not inherent in the W124 system. Two W124 variants of the 4Matic system were produced: the first system (1986–1991) used a mechanical pressure test lever to disable the system hydraulically while the second system variant (1992/1993) used an electrical test switch to break power to the system. The later system variant when in test mode allows for continued operation of the rear shock self-levelling system (SLS) when installed. Initially plagued with reliability factors, the multi-plate clutch central differentials were subject to failure; it was discontinued in 1993.

=== Second generation ===
The second generation of 4Matic was reintroduced on the W210 series in 1998/1999. Initially available only with left hand drive, the cars were again manufactured at the Magna-Steyr plant in Austria. The second generation of 4Matic utilized a full-time 4-wheel drive system with three open differentials front, centre and rear. Traction control is achieved using ETS (Electronic Traction System). This employs the ABS system with additional valves to monitor and then partially brake any wheel which loses traction. This much simpler system is also featured in the Mercedes-Benz M-Class SUV and C280 sedan.

=== Third generation ===
Since 2008, some versions of 4Matic have provided true AWD where the system is permanently active. Sophisticated engine management and ABS systems control the amount of torque transferred to each wheel, allowing the system to be effective at any speed.

=== Fourth generation ===
In 2016, Mercedes introduced a new 4WD system called 4Matic+. This system can send 100 percent of the available engine torque to either the front or rear axles. In the fifth-generation E-Class, an additional setting was introduced in the E63 S AMG model that disconnects the front axle from the powertrain, effectively turning it into a rear wheel drive automobile. This has become known as "Drift Mode", riding the wave of attention drawn by the eponymous setting first deployed in the third-generation Ford Focus RS.

== Availability ==
The second and third generation 4Matic systems are currently available on the A-Class, B-Class, C-Class, E-Class, G-Class, S-Class sedan, S-Class coupé (formerly CL), GLA, GLB, GLC (formerly GLK), GLE (formerly ML), GLS (formerly GL), GT CLA, CLS, Vito and Viano (North American name; Metris), and Sprinter 4x4 although certain right-hand-drive models are not available due to the position of the steering column. These later systems include engine and automatic stability controls.

== See also ==
- 4motion - Volkswagen-branded four-wheel-drive system
- BMW xDrive - BMW's AWD system
- Locking differential - provides additional information on differentials
- quattro (four-wheel-drive system) - the four-wheel-drive system from Audi
- S-AWC - a torque-vectoring four-wheel-drive system from Mitsubishi Motors
- Symmetrical All Wheel Drive - the four wheel drive system from Subaru
