= Mercedes-Benz M282 engine =

Mercedes-Benz M282
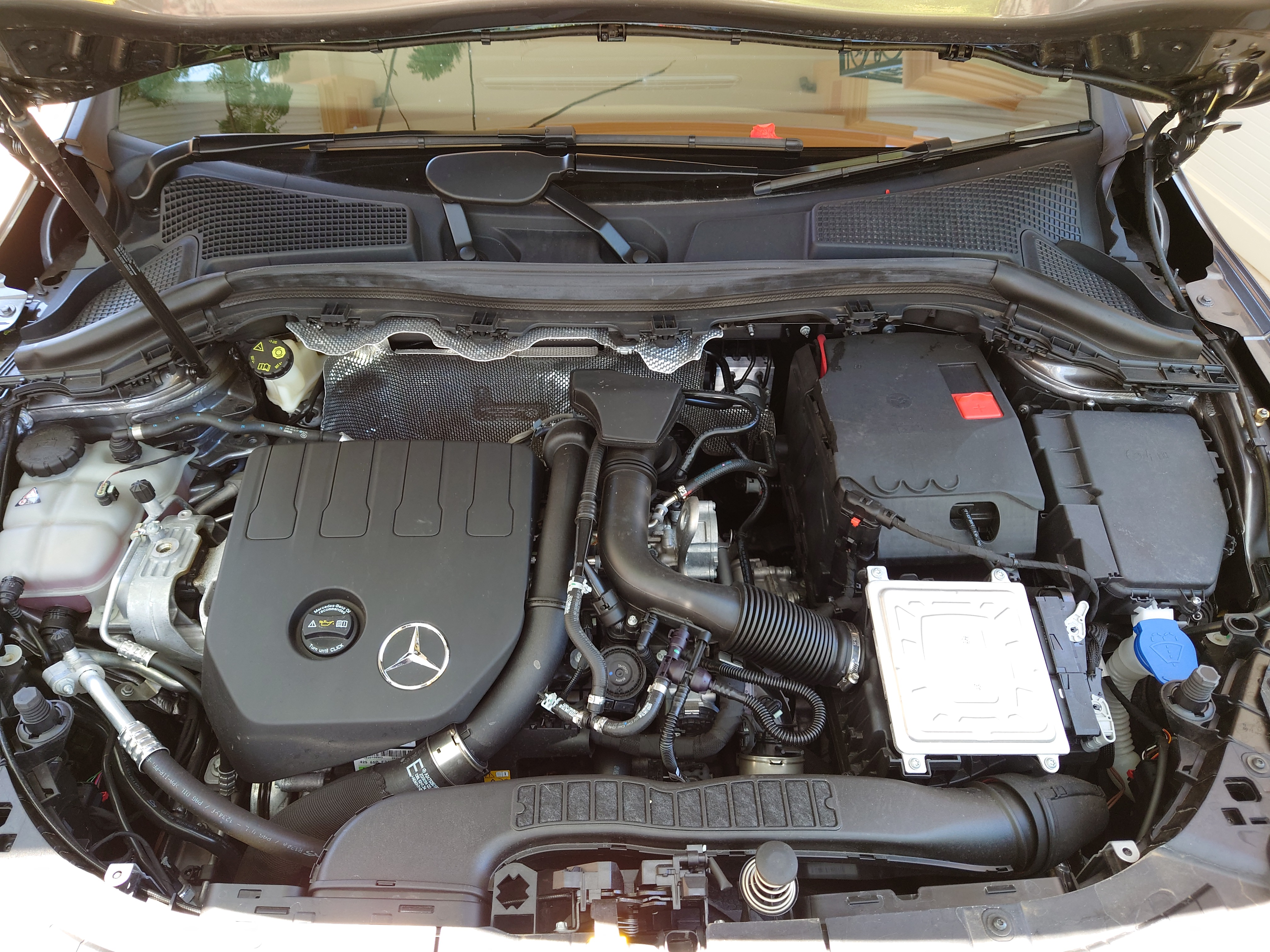

Overview
- Manufacturer: Mercedes-Benz & Renault–Nissan–Mitsubishi Alliance
- Also called: HR13DDT & H5ht
- Production: 2018–present

Layout
- Configuration: Inline 4
- Displacement: 1.3 L (1,332 cc)
- Cylinder bore: 72.2 mm (2.84 in)
- Piston stroke: 81.4 mm (3.20 in)
- Valvetrain: DOHC 4 valves x cyl. with CVTCS
- Compression ratio: 10.6:1

Combustion
- Turbocharger: Yes
- Fuel system: Direct injection
- Fuel type: Petrol
- Cooling system: Water cooled

Output
- Power output: 80–120 kW (109–163 PS; 107–161 hp)
- Torque output: 180–250 N⋅m (133–184 lb⋅ft)

Chronology
- Predecessor: M270/M274

The Mercedes-Benz M282 is a 1.3 L (1,332 cc) inline-four 16-valve turbocharged petrol engine produced from 2018. It was jointly developed by the Renault–Nissan–Mitsubishi Alliance and the Mercedes-Benz Group, and is the successor to the 1.6L variant of the M270 engine. The M282 has been sold as the H5Ht by Renault, and as the HR13DDT by Nissan.

== Design ==
The M282 was developed with Renault as part of Daimler's collaboration with the Renault–Nissan–Mitsubishi Alliance. The M282 shares the same design with the Renault H5Ht engine, with a DOHC and direct injection. The M282 is also the first Mercedes inline-four engine to feature cylinder deactivation (on the second and third cylinders), as well as an engine particulate filter. It is produced by MDC Power GmbH at the Kölleda plant in Thuringia, Germany.

== Models ==
Engine	Displacement	Power	Torque	Years
M282 DE14	1.3 L; 81.3 cu in (1,332 cc)	80 kW (109 PS; 107 hp)	180 N⋅m (133 lb⋅ft) at 1,375 rpm	2018–
M282 DE14	1.3 L; 81.3 cu in (1,332 cc)	100 kW (136 PS; 134 hp)	200 N⋅m (148 lb⋅ft) at 1,460 rpm	2018–
M282 DE14 LA	1.3 L; 81.3 cu in (1,332 cc)	120 kW (163 PS; 161 hp) at 5,500 rpm	250 N⋅m (184 lb⋅ft) at 1,620–4,000 rpm	2018–

=== M282 DE14 (80 kW version) ===
- 2018–present W177 A160
- 2019–present W247 B160

=== M282 DE14 (100 kW version) ===
- 2018–present W177 A180
- 2019–present W177 A220e
- 2019–present W247 B180
- 2019–present C118 CLA 180

=== M282 DE14 LA (120kw) ===
- 2018–present W177 A200
- 2019–present W177 A250e
- 2019–present W247 B200
- 2019–present W247 B250e
- 2019–present C118 CLA 200
- 2019–present X247 GLB 200
- 2020–present H247 GLA 200 (Include FFV Engine in Thailand)
- 2020–present C118 CLA 250e
