= Mercedes-Benz OM608 engine =

Mercedes-Benz OM608
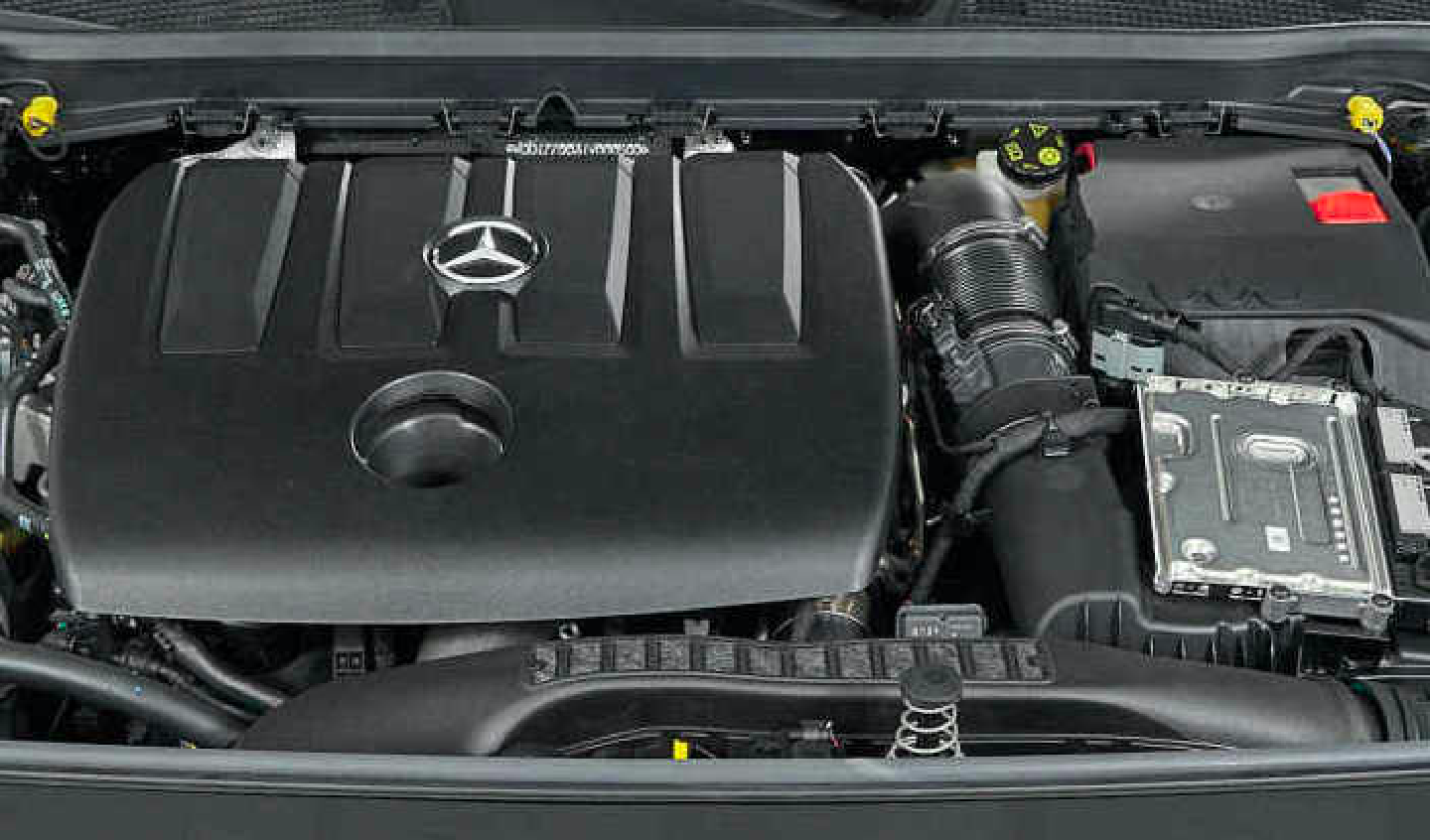

Overview
- Manufacturer: Renault
- Production: 2018–present

Layout
- Configuration: Inline four engine
- Displacement: 1.5 L (1,461 cc)
- Cylinder bore: 76 mm (2.99 in)
- Piston stroke: 80.5 mm (3.17 in)
- Cylinder block material: Cast iron
- Cylinder head material: Aluminium alloy
- Valvetrain: SOHC 2 valves x cyl.
- Compression ratio: 15.1:1

Combustion
- Turbocharger: Single-turbo
- Fuel system: Common rail direct injection
- Fuel type: Diesel

Output
- Power output: 85 kW (116 PS; 114 hp)
- Specific power: 58.2 kW (79.1 PS; 78.0 hp) per litre
- Torque output: 260 N⋅m (192 lb⋅ft)

Chronology
- Predecessor: Mercedes-Benz OM607 engine

The OM608 is a turbocharged inline-four diesel engine produced by Renault, for use in Mercedes-Benz vehicles.

== Design ==
Due to Daimler AG's collaboration with the Renault–Nissan–Mitsubishi Alliance, the OM608 is heavily based on the Renault K9K engine. It features common rail direct injection with 2 valves per cylinder, and a cast iron engine block and crankcase with an aluminium alloy cylinder head. Differences include the engine control unit (ECU), a stop start engine system, a dual-mass flywheel, and the ancillaries.

== Models ==
Engine	Power	Torque	Years
OM608 DE15 SCR	85 kW (116 PS; 114 hp) @ 4,000 rpm	260 N⋅m (192 lb⋅ft) @ 1,750–2,500 rpm	2018–

=== OM608 DE15 SCR ===
- 2018–present W177 A180d
