= Mercedes-Benz A-Class (W177) =

German small car (from 2018)

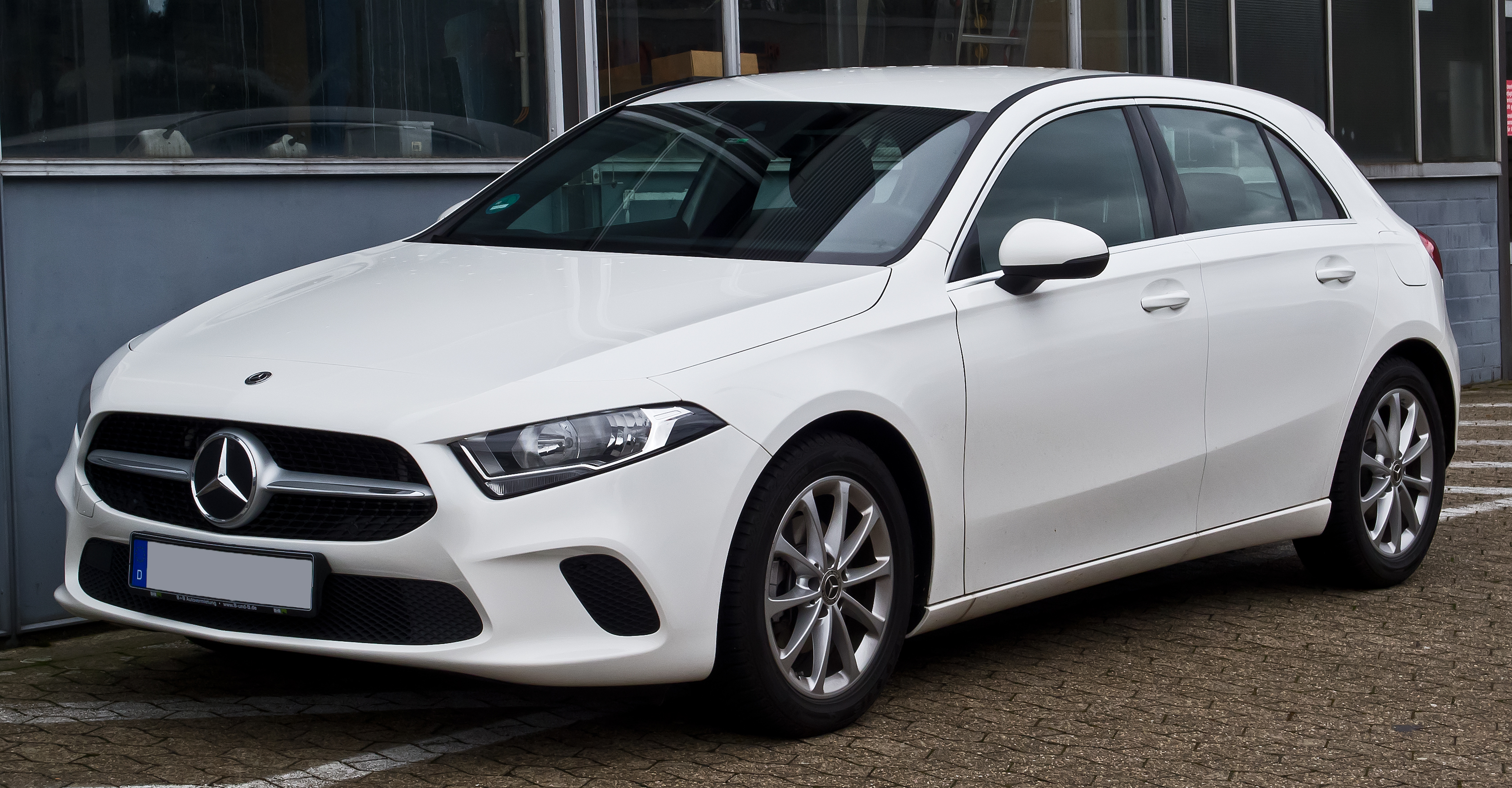
- Mercedes-Benz A 180 Progressive

Overview
- Manufacturer: Mercedes-Benz
- Model code: W177 (hatchback); V177 (saloon); Z177 (long-wheelbase saloon)
- Production: April 2018 – present
- Model years: 2018–present 2019–2022 (North America)
- Assembly: Germany: Rastatt (2018–2026); China: Beijing (Beijing Benz; LWB sedan); Finland: Uusikaupunki (Valmet Automotive); Hungary: Kecskemét (Mercedes-Benz Manufacturing Hungary); Mexico: Aguascalientes (Cooperation Manufacturing Plant Aguascalientes, 2018–2020); Thailand: Samut Prakan (TAAP); Malaysia: Pekan (HICOM); Indonesia: Bogor (MBI)
- Designer: Mark Fetherston

Body and chassis
- Class: Subcompact executive car (C)
- Body style: 5-door hatchback; 4-door sedan
- Layout: Front-engine, front-wheel-drive; Front-engine, all-wheel-drive (4Matic)
- Platform: MFA2
- Related: Mercedes-Benz GLA (H247); Mercedes-Benz GLB (X247); Mercedes-Benz CLA (C118); Mercedes-Benz B-Class (W247)

Powertrain
- Engine: Petrol: 1.3 L M282 CGI I4 turbo; 2.0 L M260 I4 turbo; 2.0 L M139 AMG I4 turbo; Petrol plug-in hybrid: 1.3 L M282 I4 turbo; Diesel: 1.5 L OM608 BlueTEC I4 turbo; 2.0 L OM654 BlueTEC I4 turbo
- Transmission: 6-speed manual (2018–2023); 7-speed automatic; 8-speed automatic; 7-speed DCT; 8-speed DCT
- Hybrid drivetrain: Mild hybrid (2023–present, petrol models); Plug-in hybrid (A 250 e)
- Battery: 15.6 kWh lithium-ion (Plug-in hybrid)

Dimensions
- Wheelbase: 2,729 mm (107.4 in); 2,789 mm (109.8 in) (LWB sedan)
- Length: 4,419 mm (174.0 in) (hatchback); 4,549 mm (179.1 in) (sedan); 4,622 mm (182.0 in) (LWB sedan)
- Width: 1,796 mm (70.7 in)
- Height: 1,440 mm (56.7 in) (hatchback); 1,454 mm (57.2 in) (sedan)
- Kerb weight: 1,300–1,445 kg (2,866–3,186 lb); 1,680 kg (3,704 lb) (Plug-in Hybrid)

Chronology
- Predecessor: Mercedes-Benz A-Class (W176)

The Mercedes-Benz A-Class (W177) is the fourth and current generation of the A-Class range of subcompact executive hatchbacks and sedans. It was launched in 2018 as the successor to the W176 A-Class, with sales commencing in March 2018. The available body styles include:

- 5-door hatchback (W177 model code)
- 4-door sedan (V177 model code)
- 4-door long wheelbase sedan (Z177, only sold in China)

== Development and launch ==
The W177 A-Class hatchback officially debuted at the 2018 Geneva Motor Show. It is based on the front-wheel drive MFA2 (Modular Front Architecture) platform and features front MacPherson struts, and rear torsion beam suspension, though some models are equipped with multi-link rear suspension.

In mid-2020, the production of the North American-market A-Class sedan returned to Rastatt, Germany from the COMPAS plant in Aguascalientes, Mexico to increase the production capacity of the GLB.

The vehicle received a facelift for the 2023 model year.

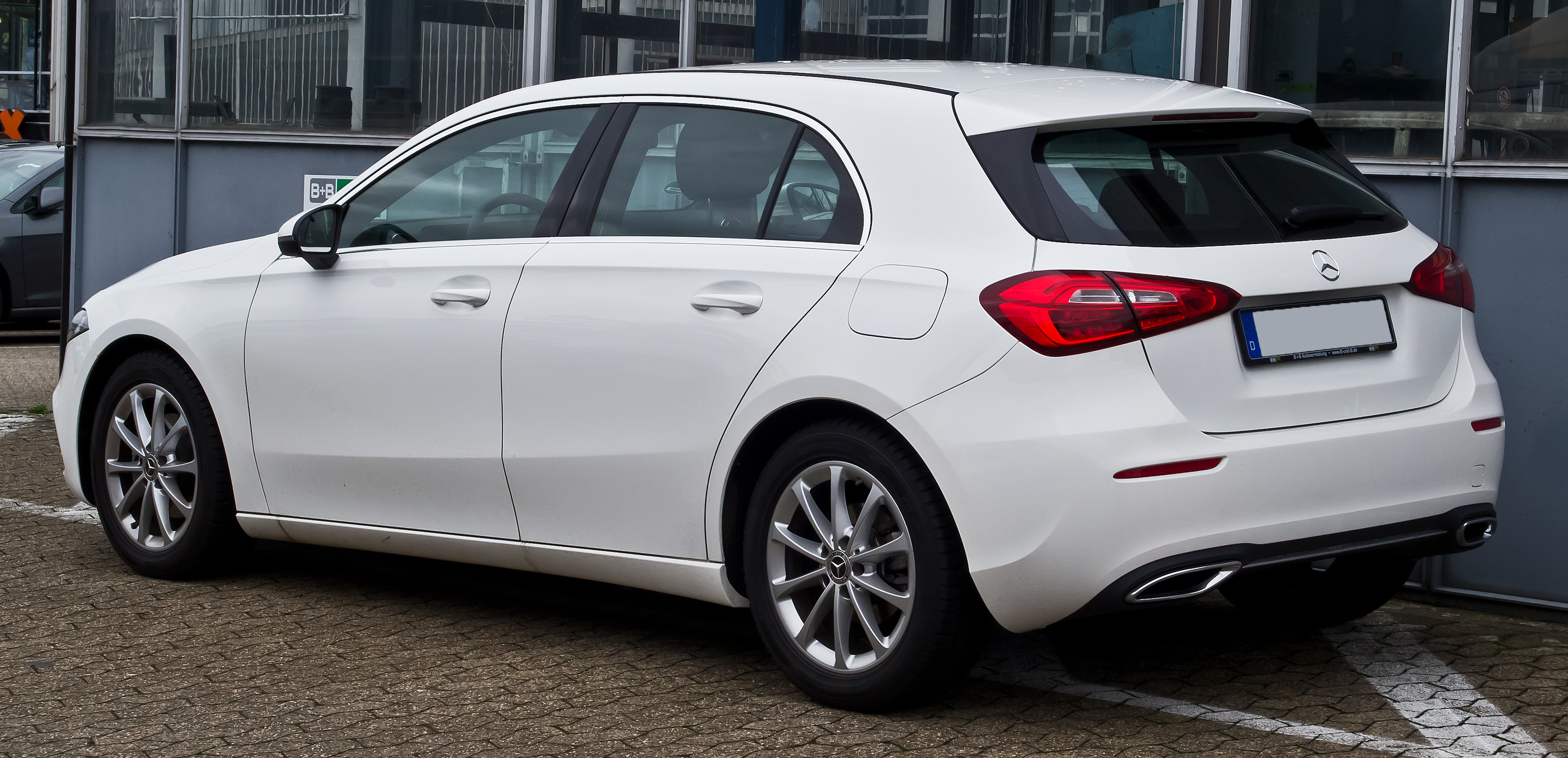
2019 Mercedes-Benz A 180

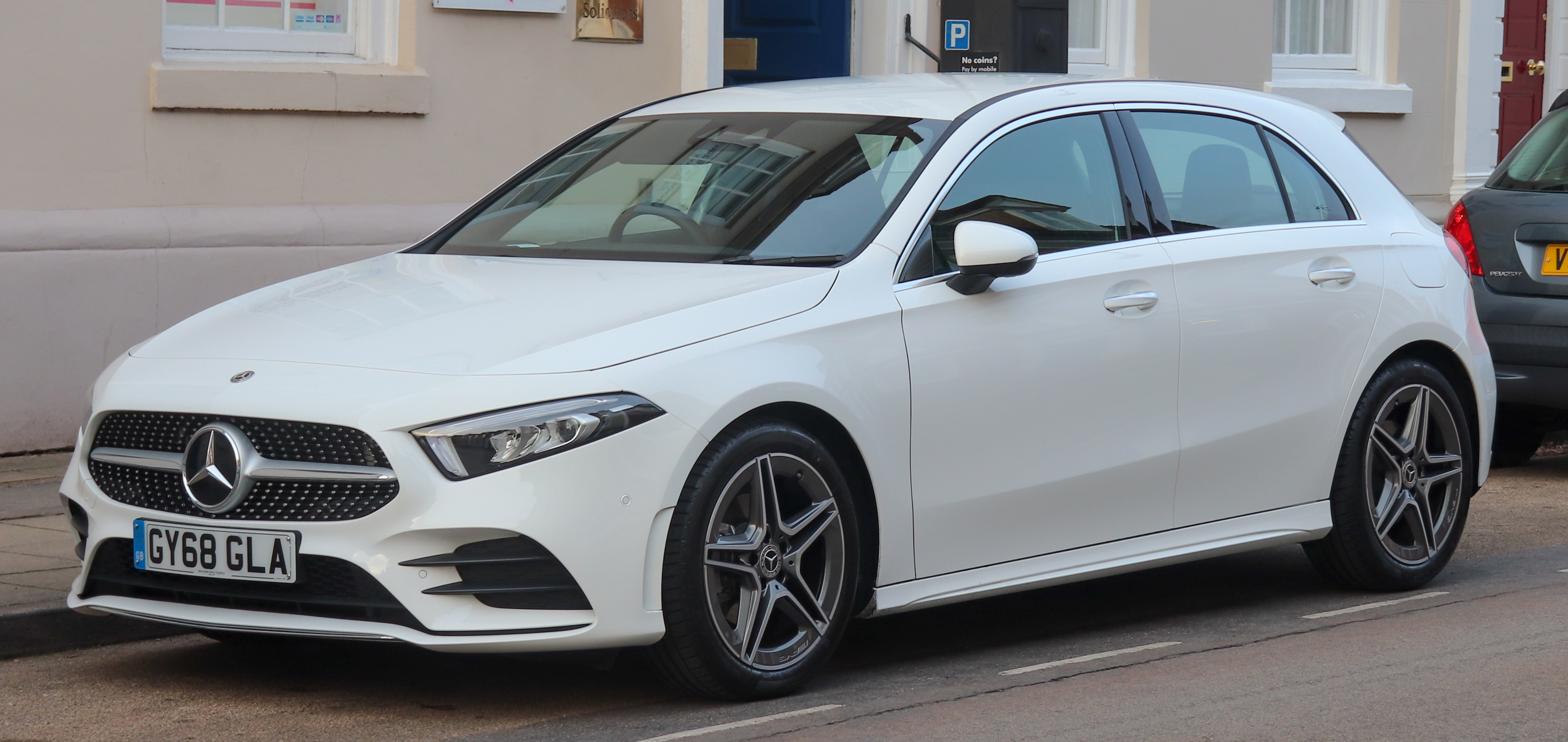
2018 Mercedes-Benz A200 AMG Line

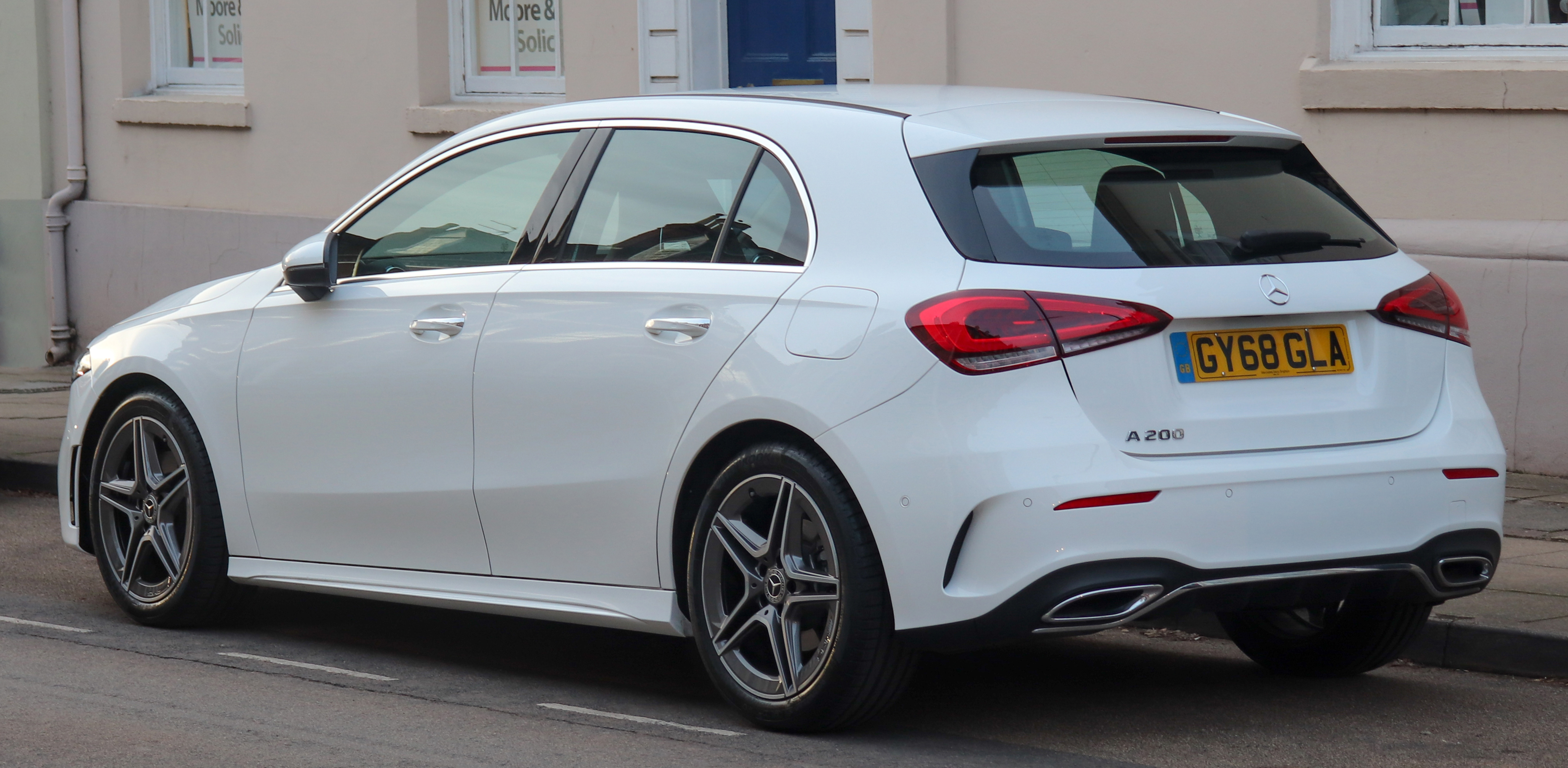
2018 Mercedes-Benz A200 AMG Line

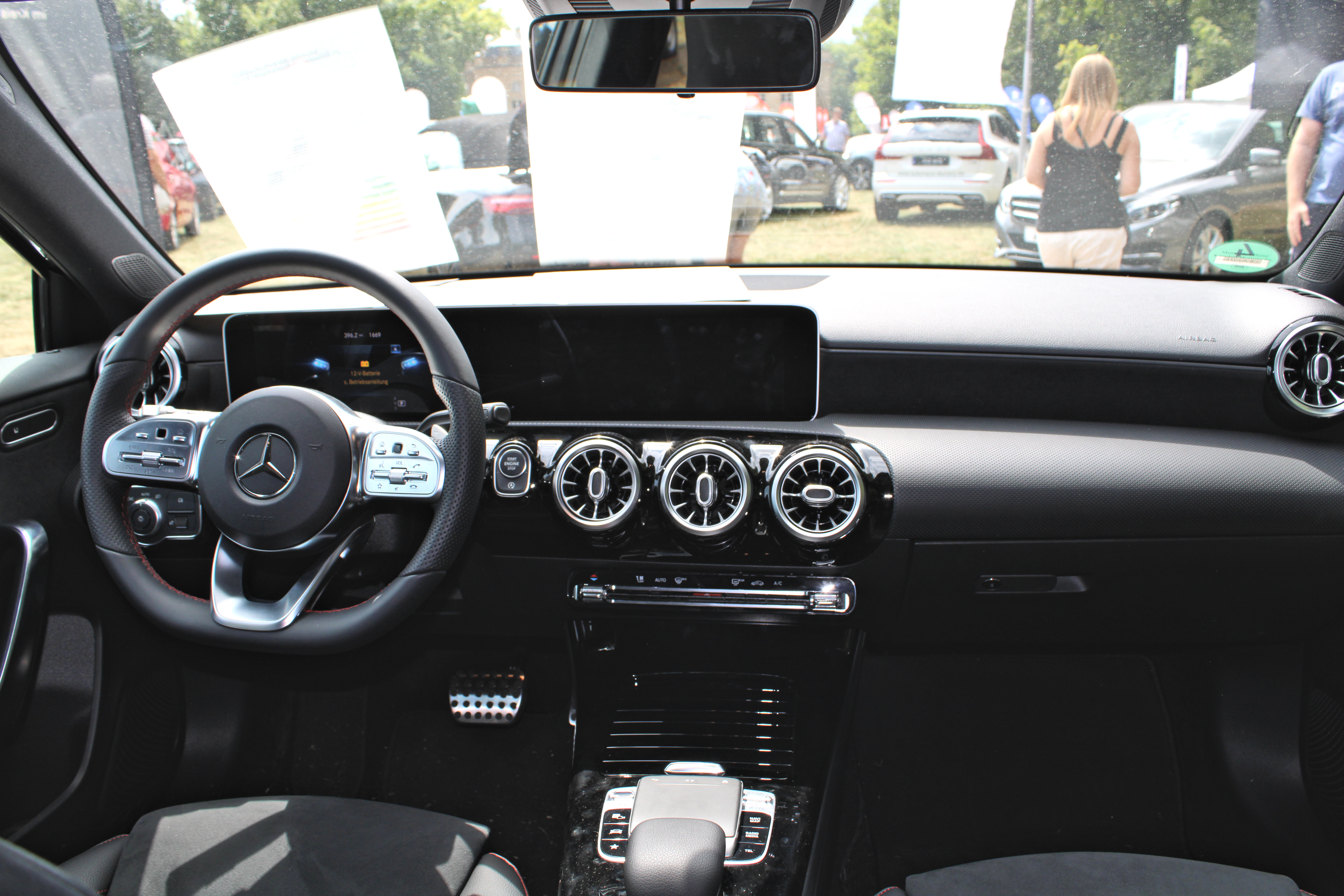
Interior

== Sedan (V177, Z177) ==
A 4-door sedan model was released in late 2018. The A-Class sedan is sold alongside the A-Class hatchback in Europe, while it marks the first time the A-Class is offered in North America but as a sedan only in the US and as both a hatchback and sedan in Canada, while in Mexico it's the first time the sedan is sold, as the hatchback has been marketed for the first and third generation before.

It is based on the Mercedes-Benz Concept A Sedan revealed at the 2017 Shanghai Motor Show and came in response to demand for a more practical alternative to the Mercedes-Benz CLA. A long-wheelbase sedan model (Z177) was also unveiled at the 2018 Auto China Show, featuring a 60 mm (2 in) longer wheelbase and is sold exclusively in China.

At its debut Daimler claimed it had the lowest aerodynamic drag of all production vehicles in the world, with a drag area below 0.49 m^{2}, depending on exact equipment, including aerodynamic wheel and tire combination, grille shutters, etc.

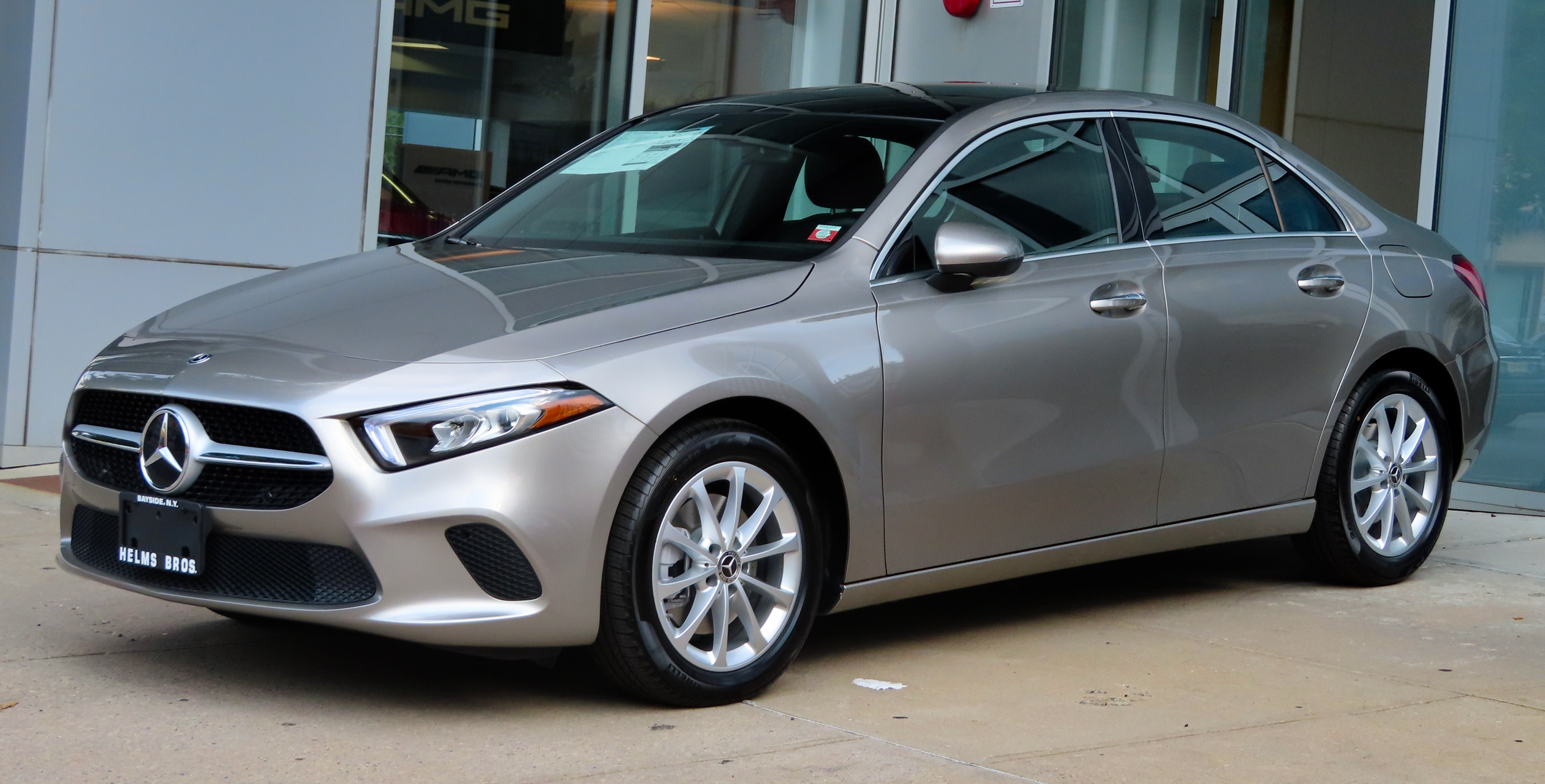
2019 Mercedes-Benz A220 4MATIC sedan

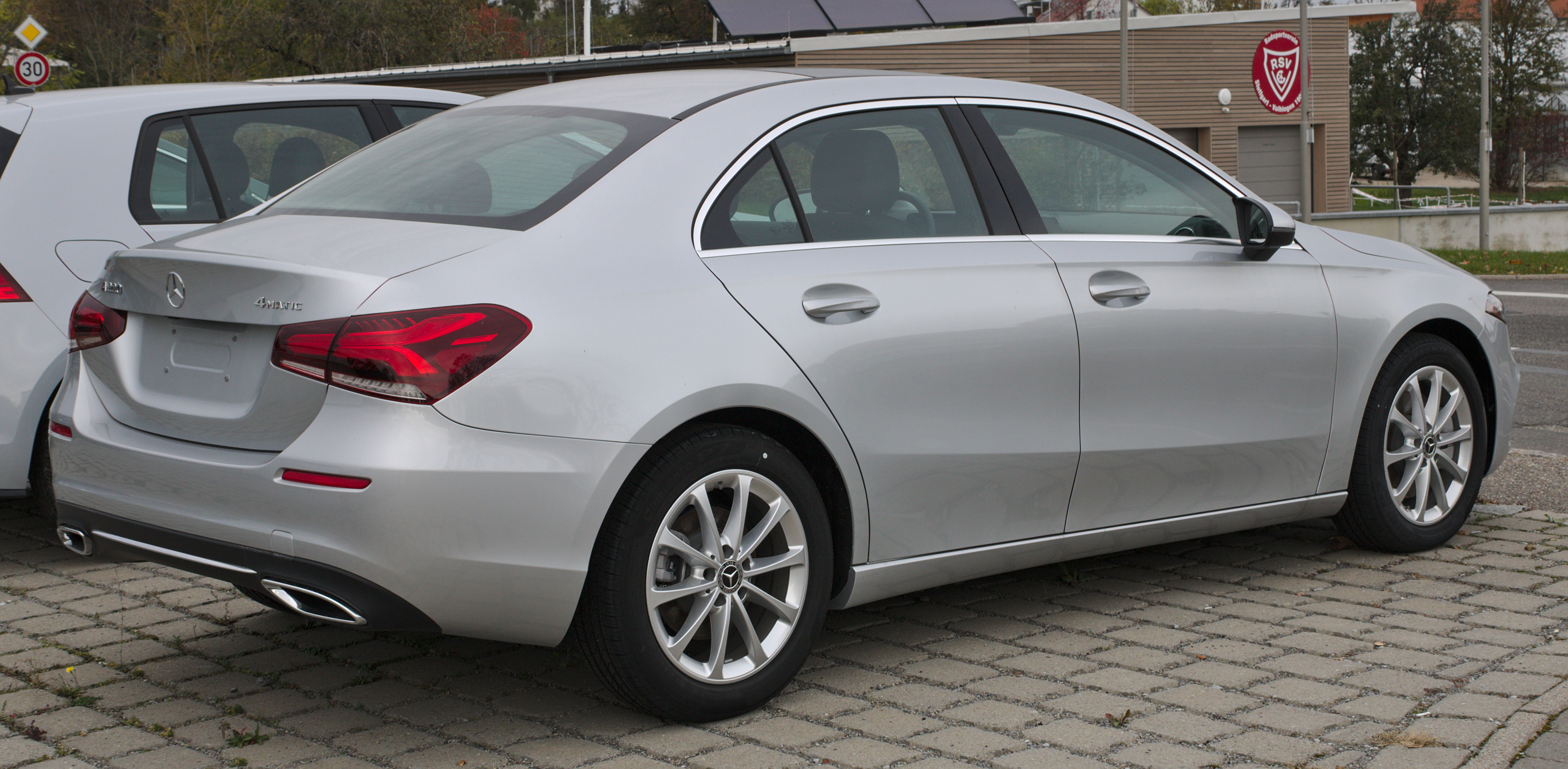
2019 Mercedes-Benz A220 4MATIC sedan

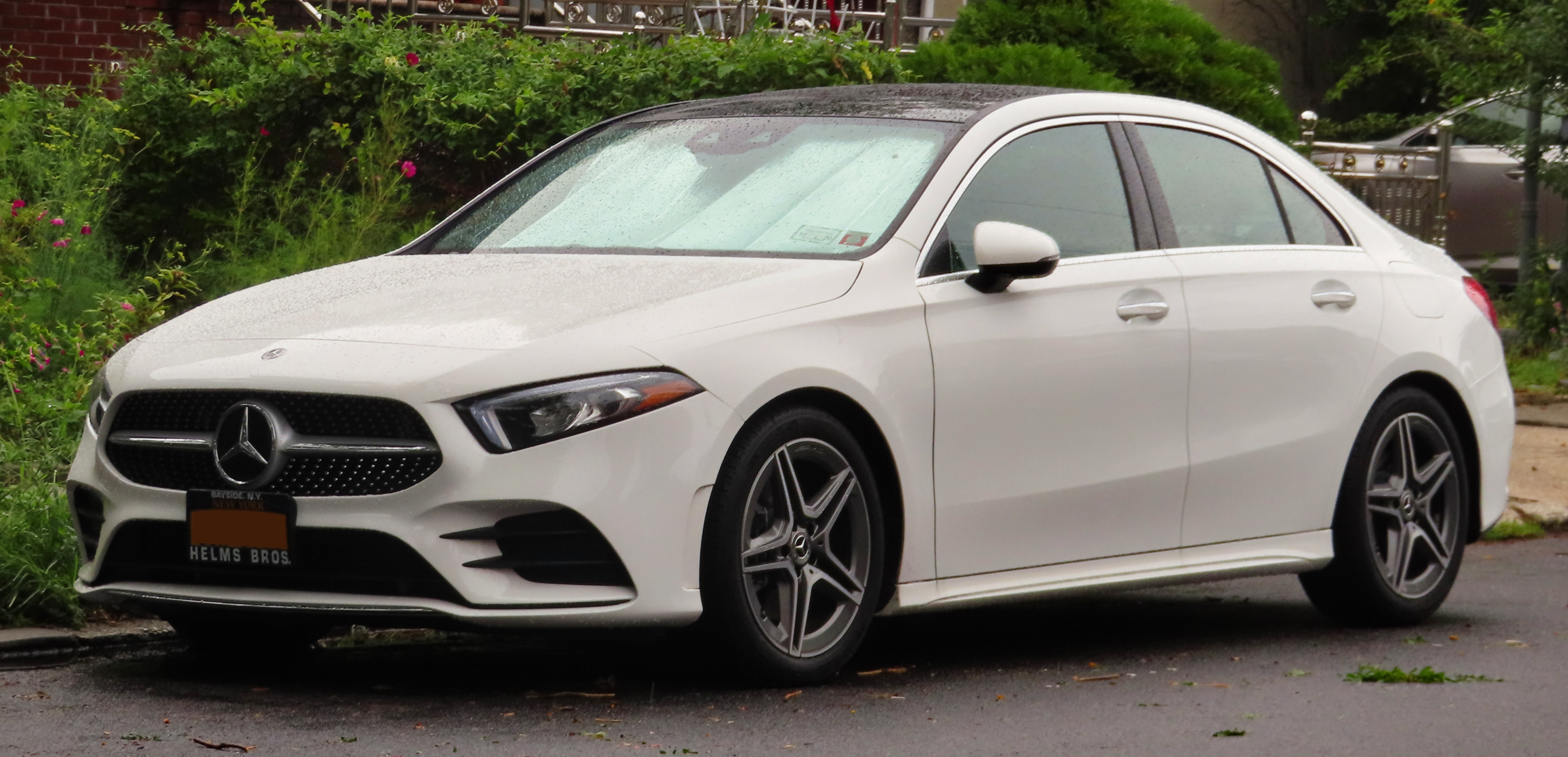
2019 Mercedes-Benz A220 AMG Line 4MATIC sedan

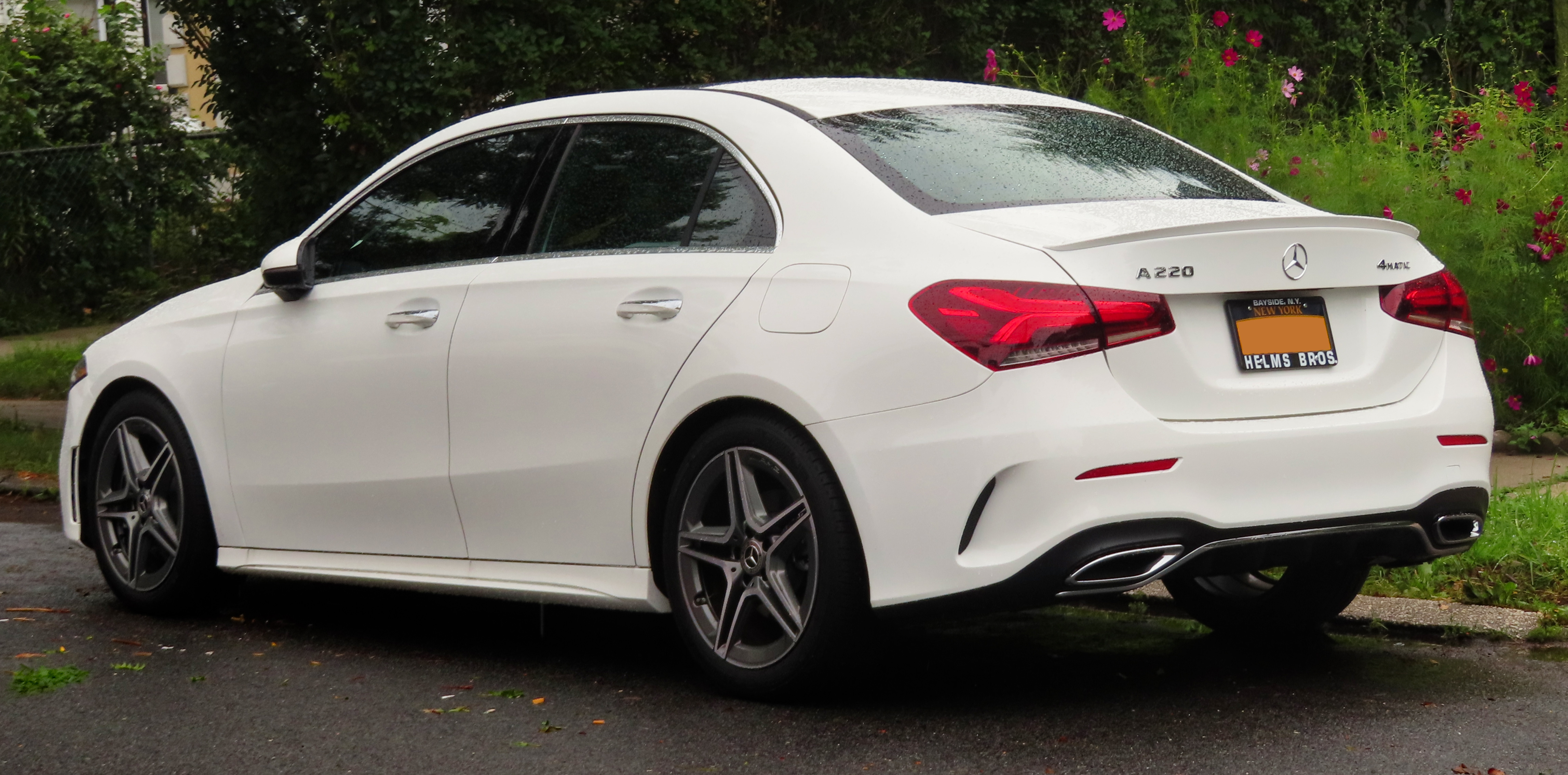
2019 Mercedes-Benz A220 AMG Line 4MATIC sedan

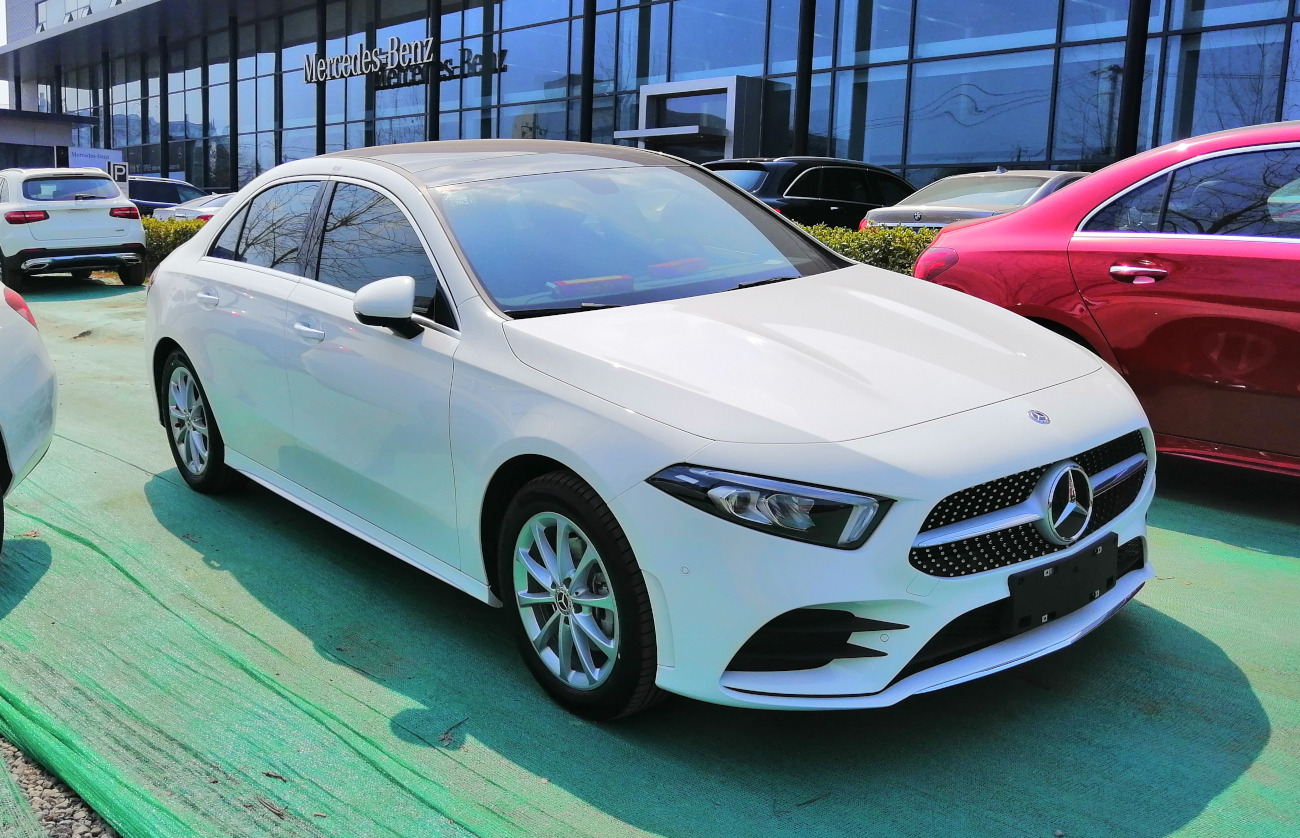
2019 Mercedes-Benz A200L (LWB sedan)

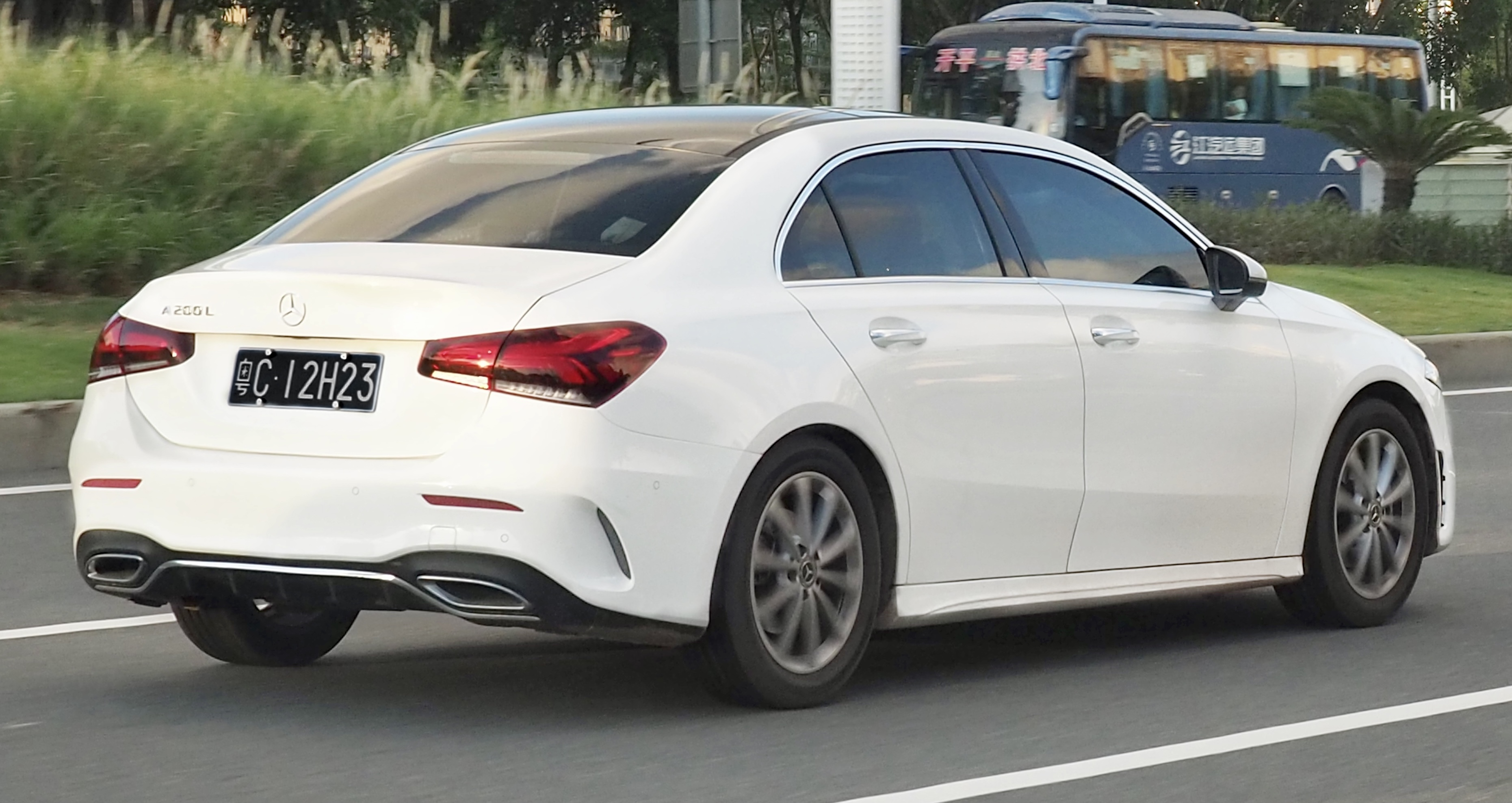
2019 Mercedes-Benz A200L (LWB sedan)

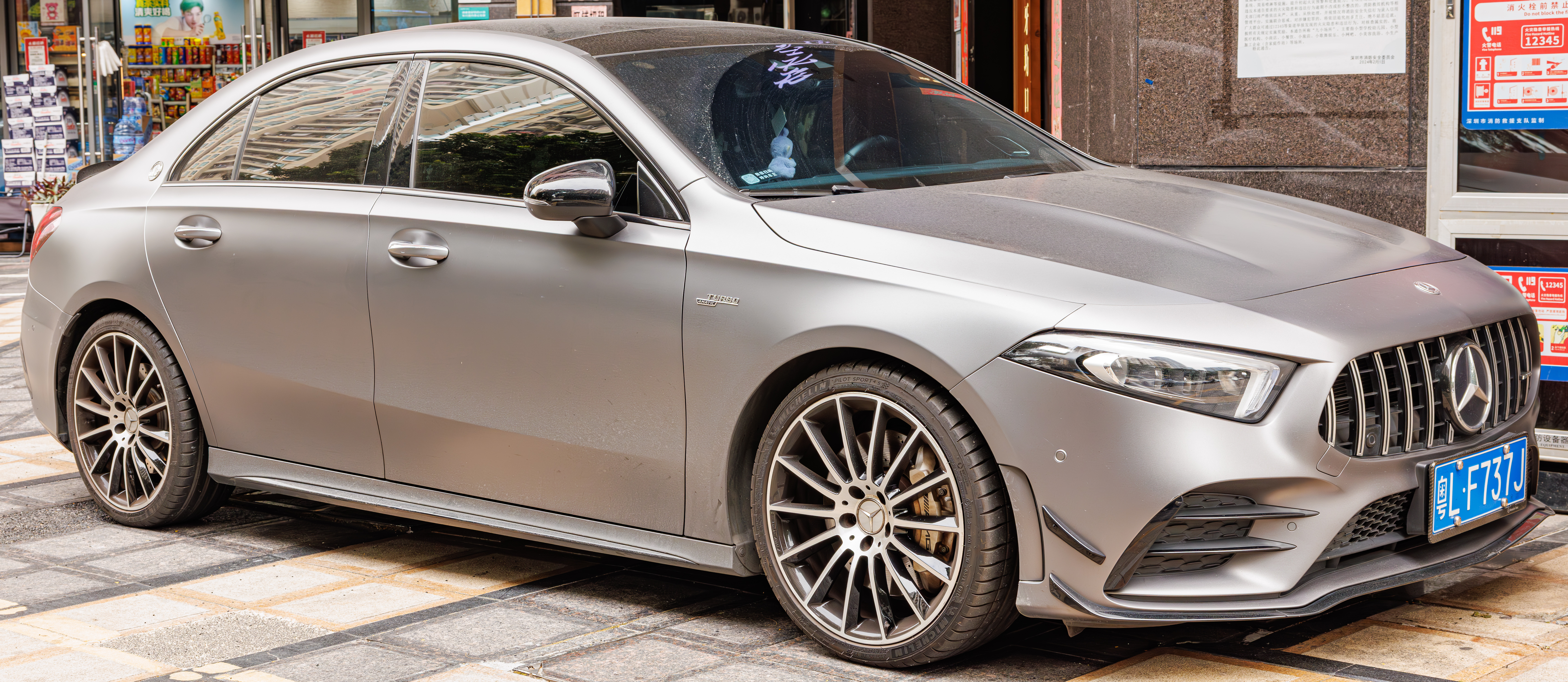
Mercedes-AMG A 35 L 4MATIC

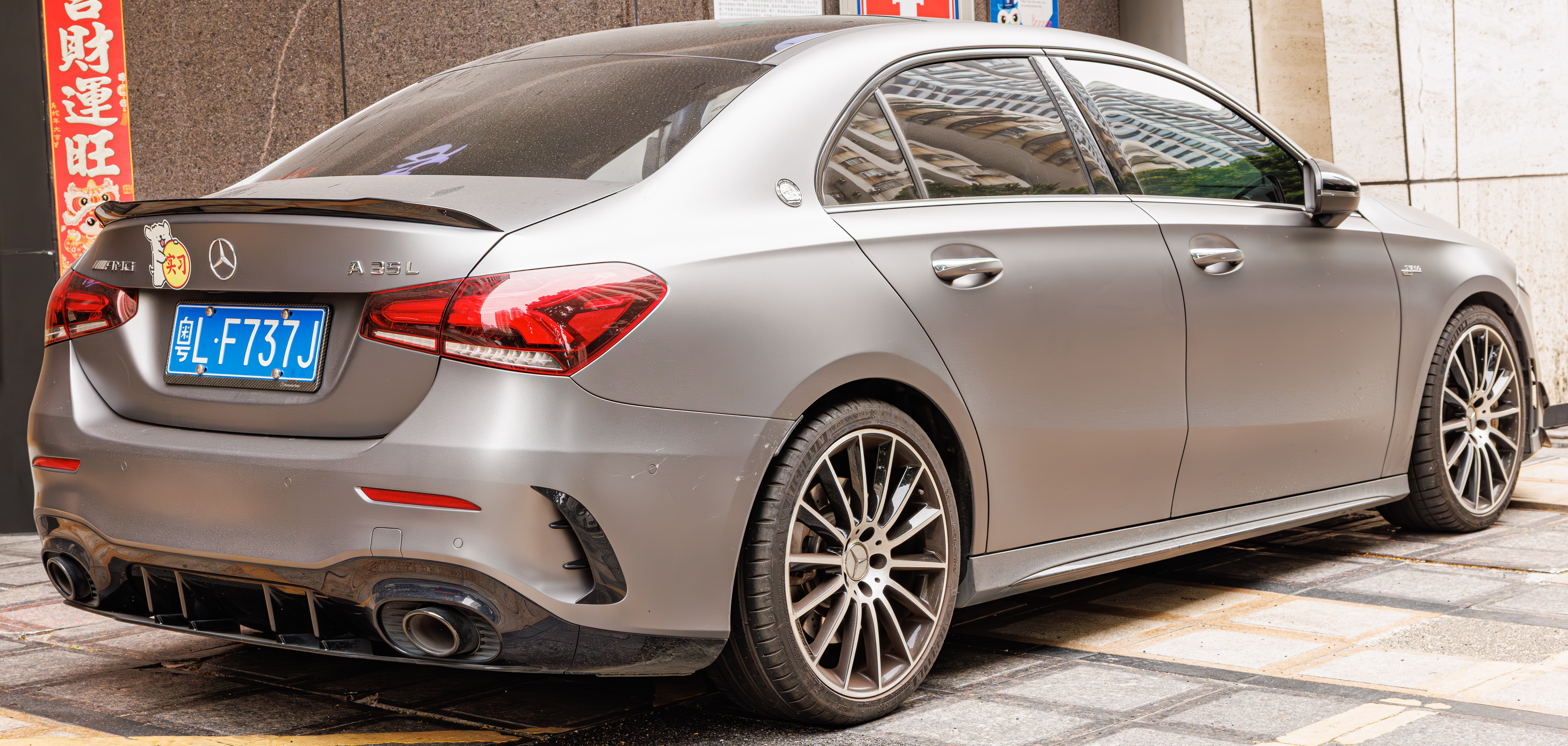
Mercedes-AMG A 35 L 4MATIC

== Equipment ==
The W177 A-Class comes as standard with 16-inch alloy wheels, cruise control, keyless ignition, and LED daytime running lights.

All models feature the new Mercedes-Benz User Experience (MBUX) infotainment system with a redesigned touch interface and voice-controlled smart assistant that is activated by saying "Hey Mercedes". MBUX also contains what3words functionality as standard. It is also able to offer quick shortcuts to menus based on the past habits of the user. The system is also optionally available with an augmented reality navigation system that records and displays directional arrows on the road in the navigation system.

Standard models feature two 7-inch displays for the instrument cluster and MBUX screen, and can be upgraded to a 10.25-inch display with touchpad controls, real-time traffic information, and traffic sign recognition. Other available options include Apple CarPlay and Android Auto, ambient lighting, a head-up display, and the use of a smartphone to lock or unlock the car via NFC.

== Mercedes-AMG A 35 4MATIC+, A 45 4MATIC+, and A 45 S 4MATIC+ ==
The A 35 4MATIC+ model was unveiled at the 2018 Paris Motor Show. It uses an all-wheel drive layout and has a 7-speed dual clutch AMG SpeedShift DCT transmission.

On 2 January 2019, the automobile insurance company, HUK24, accidentally revealed the information about new A 45 4MATIC+ and A 45 S 4MATIC+ AMG in its website. The engine is heavily revised M133 and renamed M139 with higher compression ratio (9.0:1 versus 8.6:1 for M133 engine) and a twin-scroll turbocharger situated behind the engine for better air flow management. There are two power levels: A 45 4MATIC+ with 310 kW (421 PS; 416 hp) and 480 N⋅m (354 lb⋅ft) and A 45 S 4MATIC+ with 310 kW (421 PS; 416 hp) and 500 N⋅m (369 lb⋅ft). At 416 hp (422 PS), the M139 engine fitted to A 45 S is the second most powerful series production four-cylinder engine with specific output of 155 kW (211 PS) per litre (or 77.5 kW per cylinder).

The Mercedes-Benz A35 arrived in North America as the 2020 model, though it was only available as a sedan variant in the US, while Canada and Mexico received both the hatchback and sedan models of the A35. In addition, Mexico also got the A45 4MATIC+ and A45 S 4MATIC+ hatchbacks.

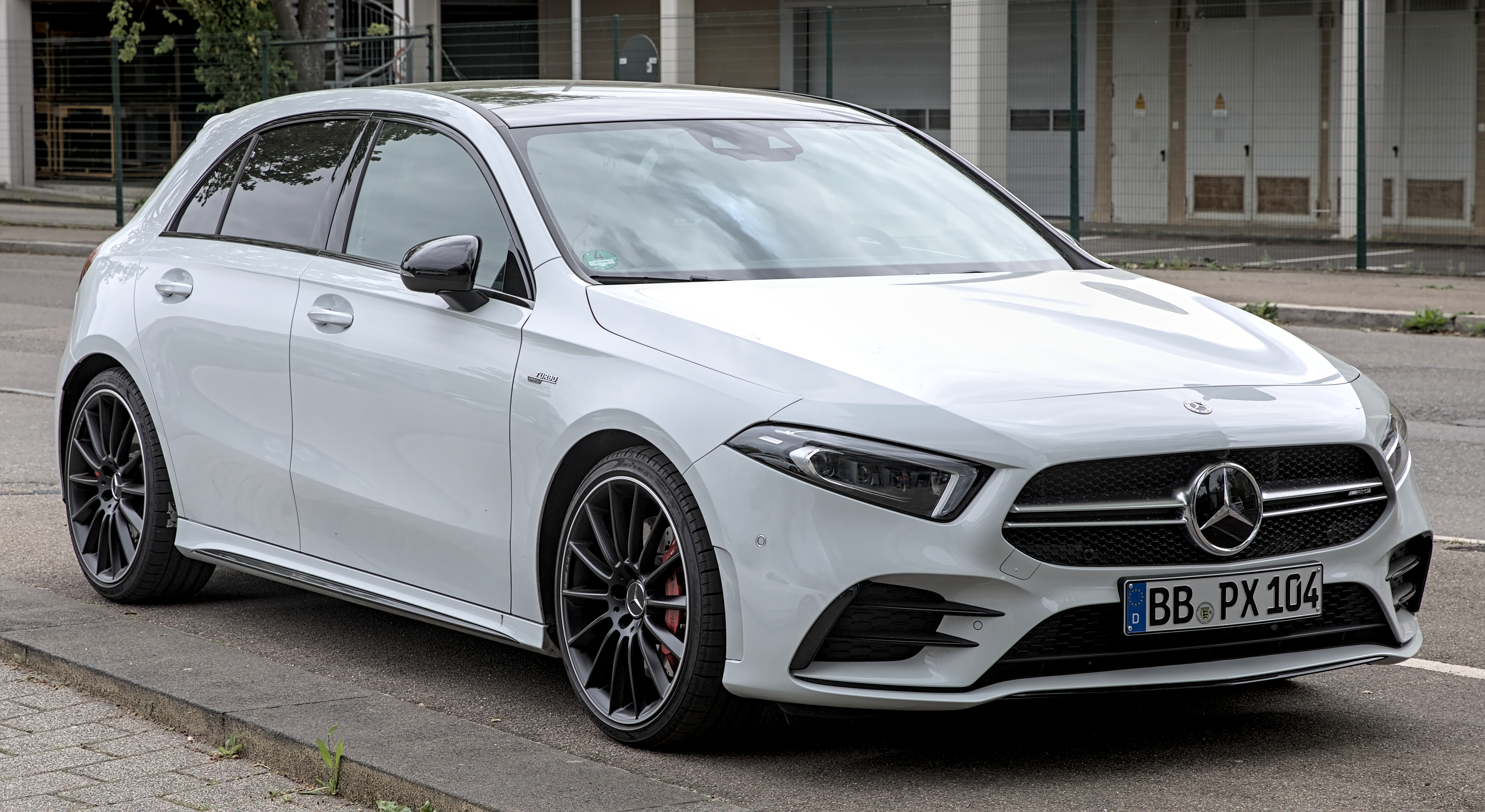
2020 Mercedes-AMG A 35 4MATIC

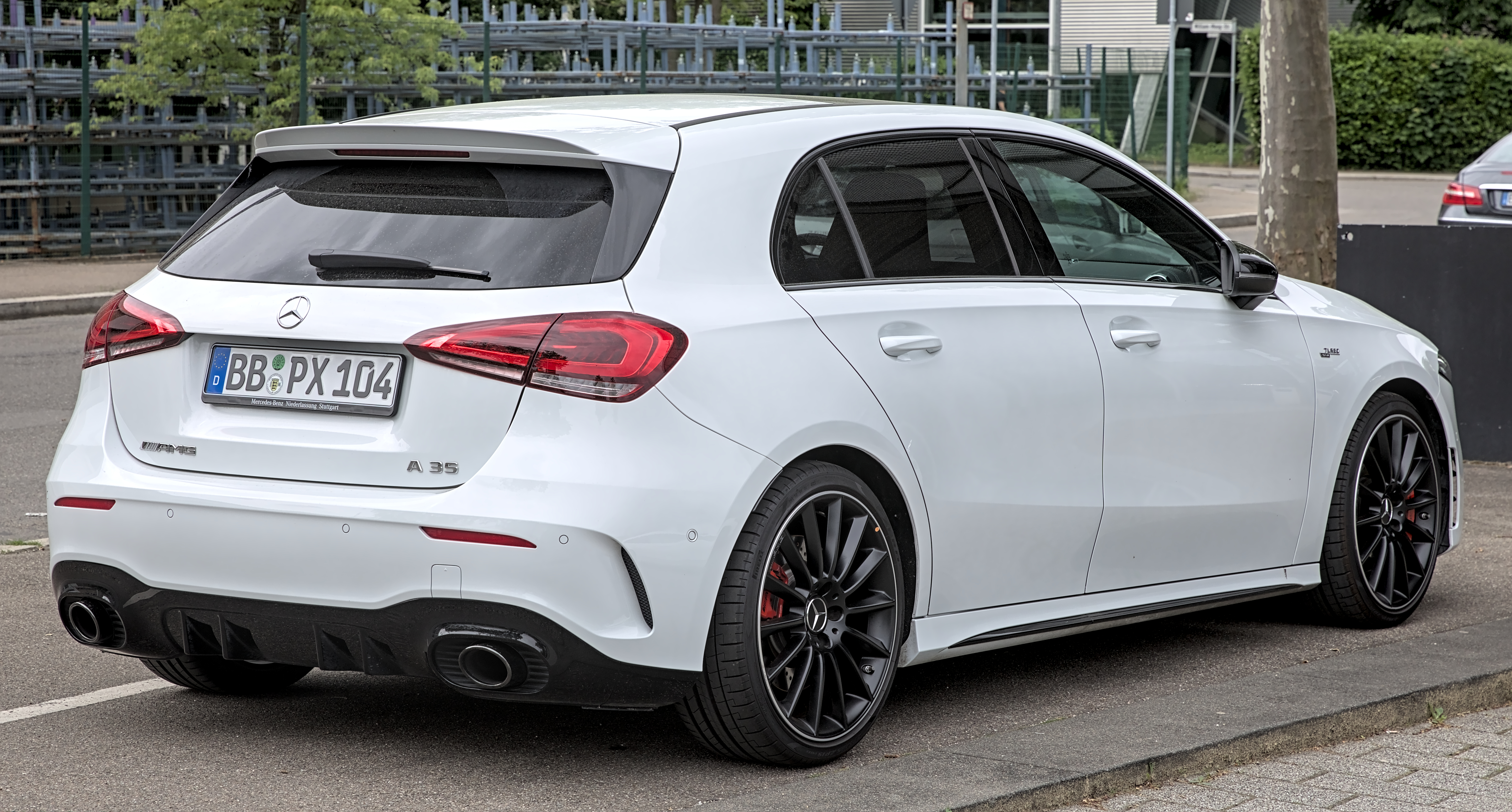
2020 Mercedes-AMG A 35 4MATIC

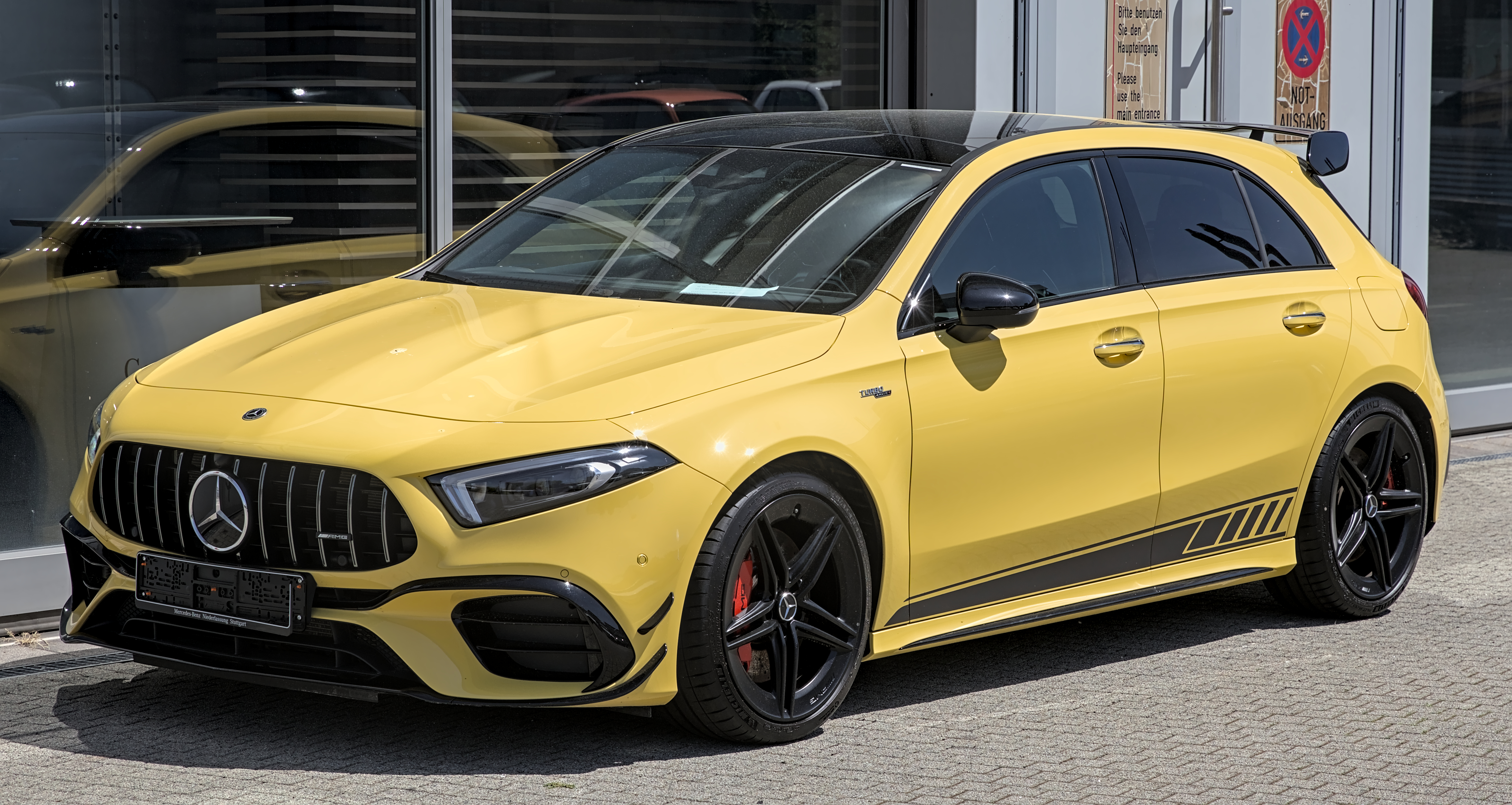
Mercedes-AMG A 45 S 4MATIC+

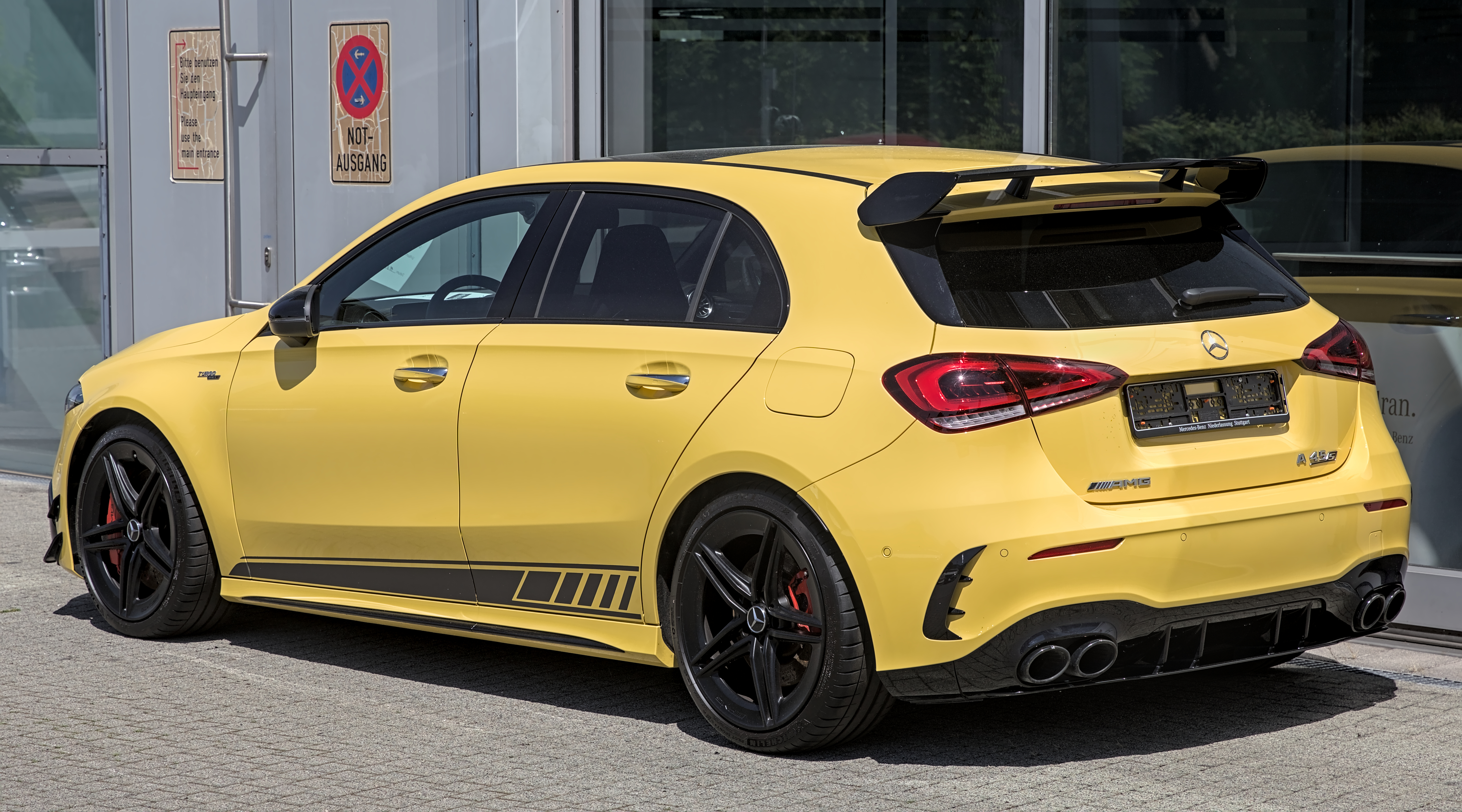
Mercedes-AMG A 45 S 4MATIC+

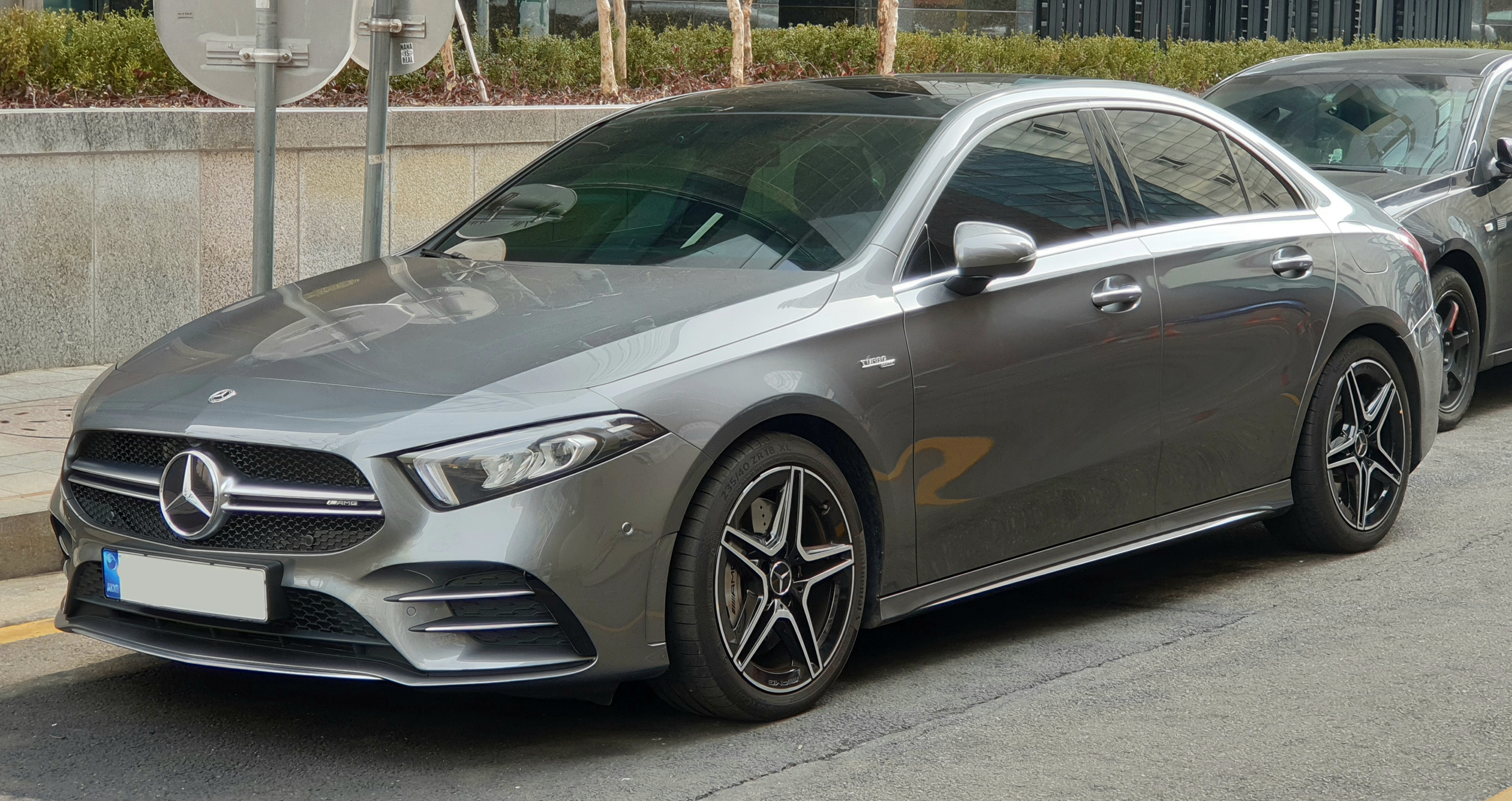
2020 Mercedes-AMG A 35 4MATIC sedan

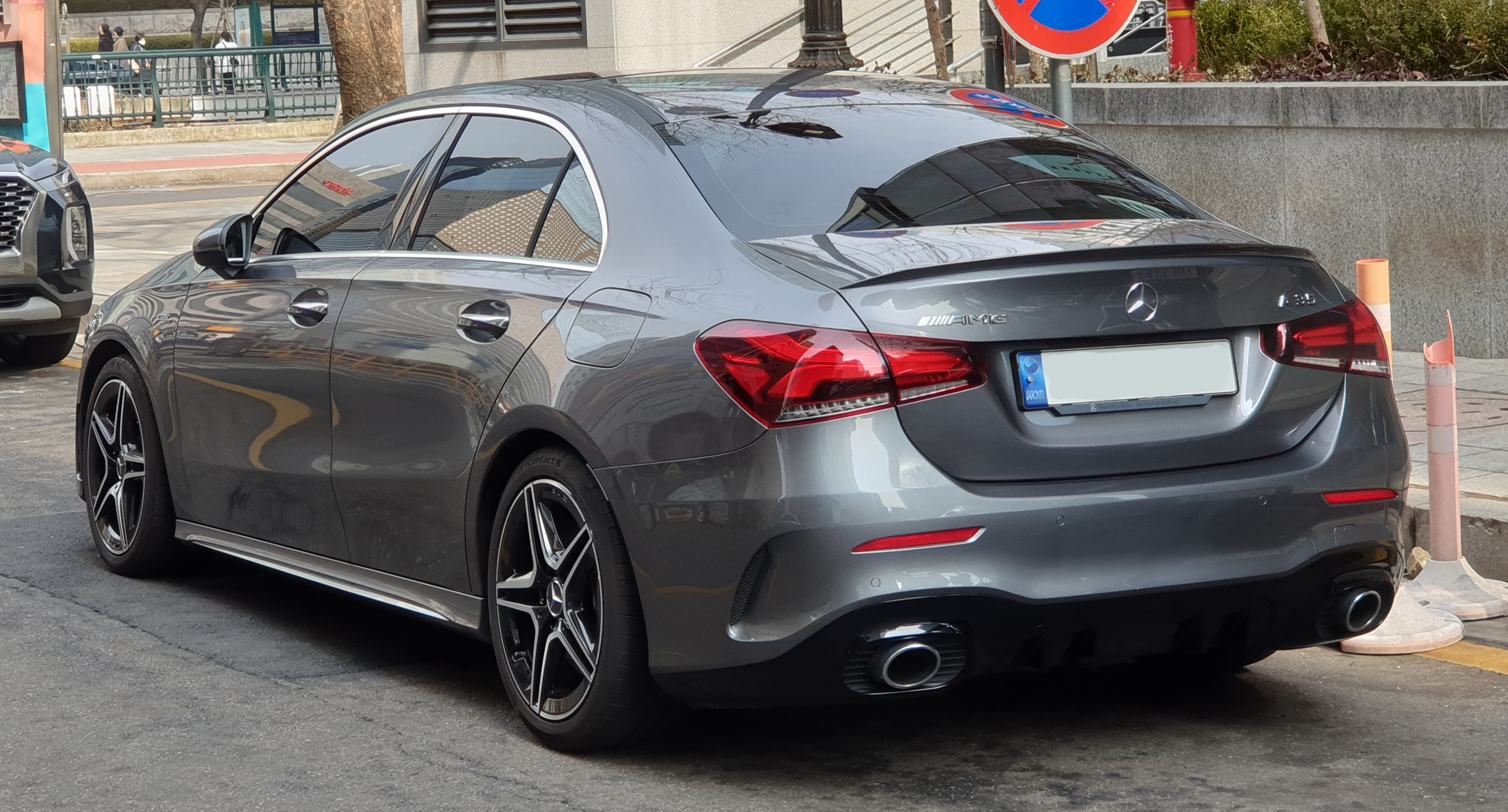
2020 Mercedes-AMG A 35 4MATIC sedan

== 2023 facelift ==
The A-Class received a facelift, unveiled in late 2022 for the 2023 model year. Notable enhancements include updated headlights and taillights. While the engines remain unchanged, petrol models now incorporate a 48-volt mild hybrid system. Furthermore, the 2023 A-Class features a redesigned interior and an upgraded infotainment screen, housing the latest iteration of the Mercedes-Benz MBUX system. Finally, the manual transmission was retired, along with the other two remaining manual models (the B-Class and CLA).

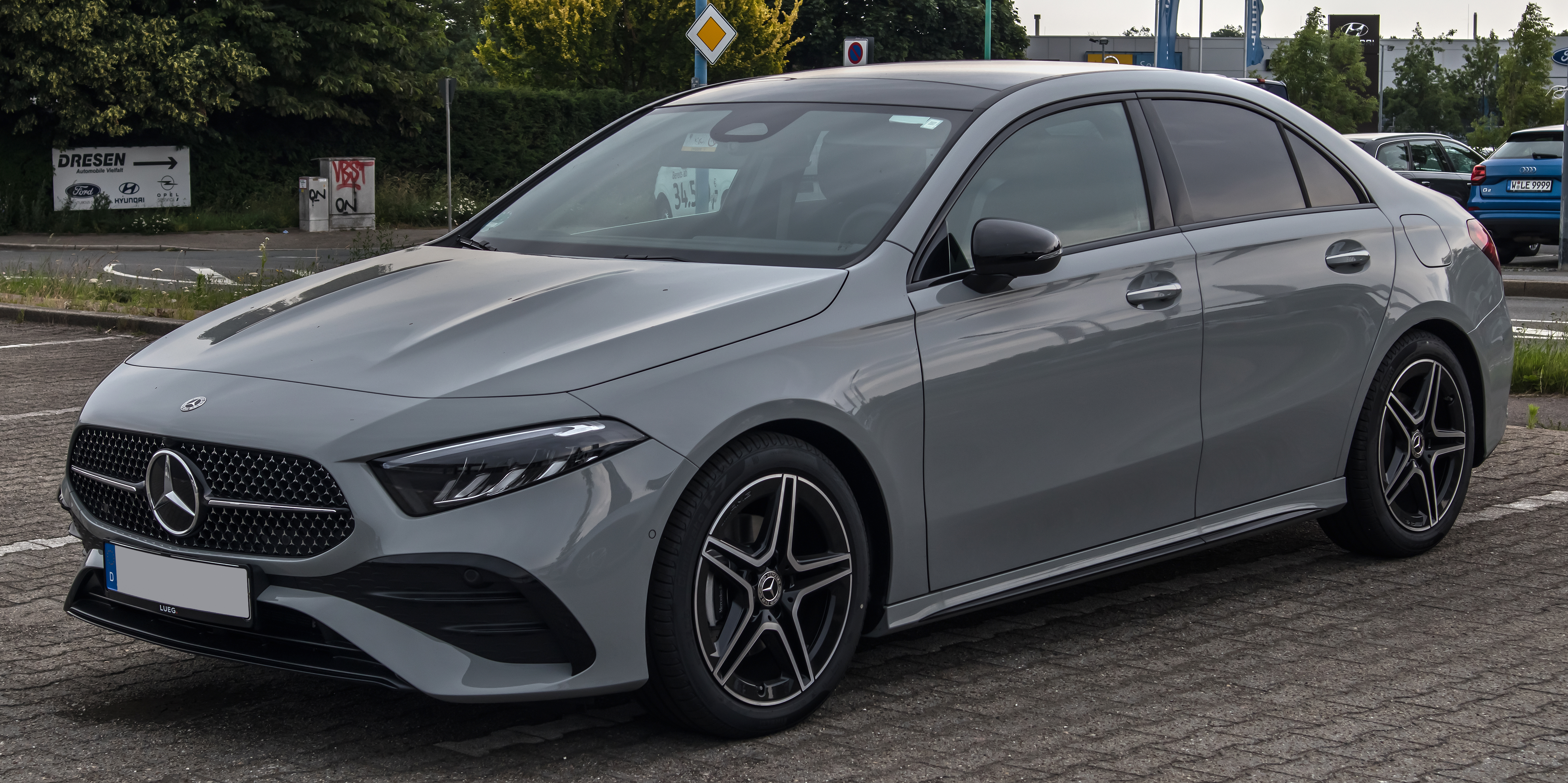
2024 Mercedes Benz A200 AMG Line sedan (facelift)

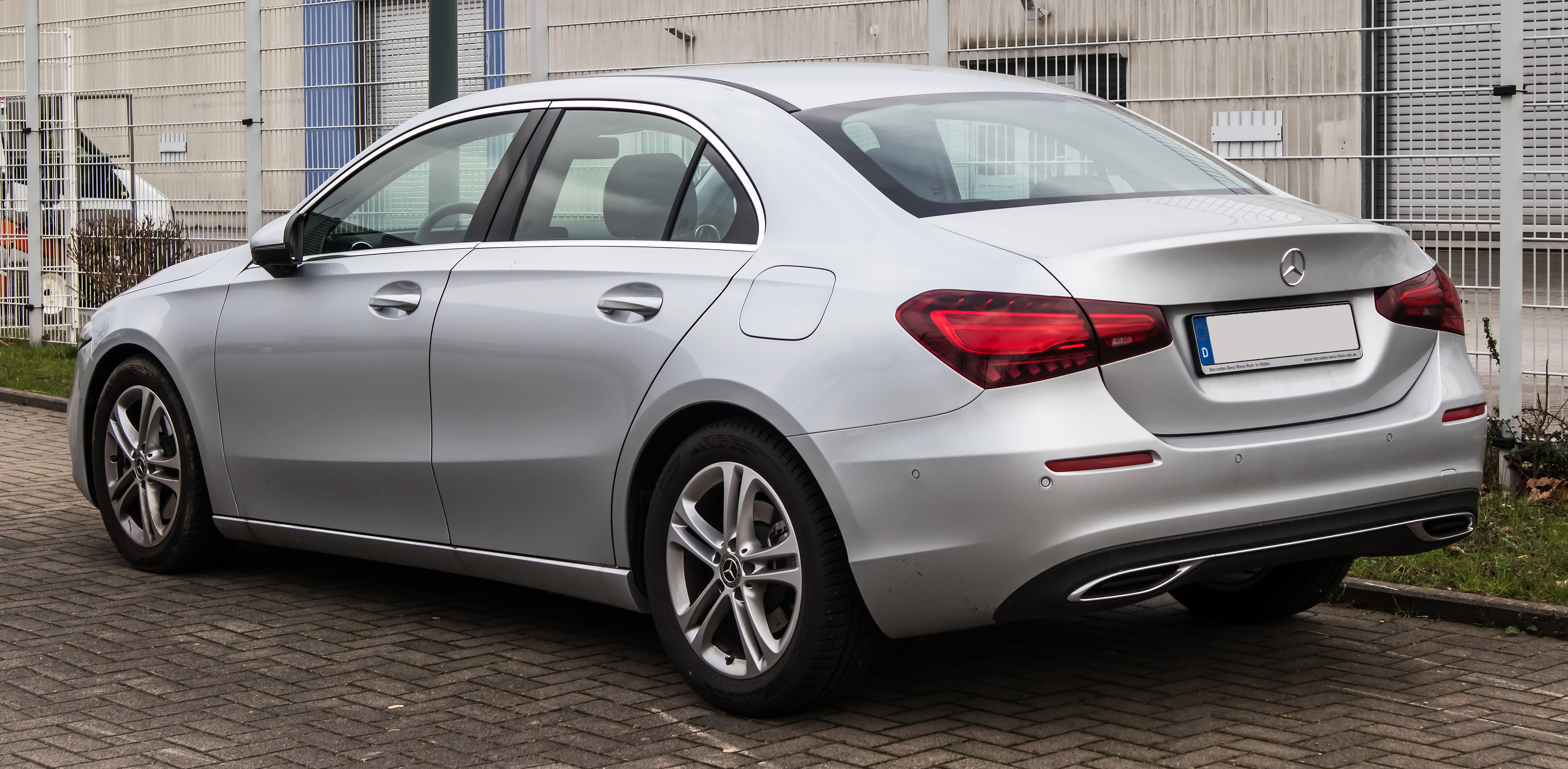
2024 Mercedes Benz A200 Progressive sedan (facelift)

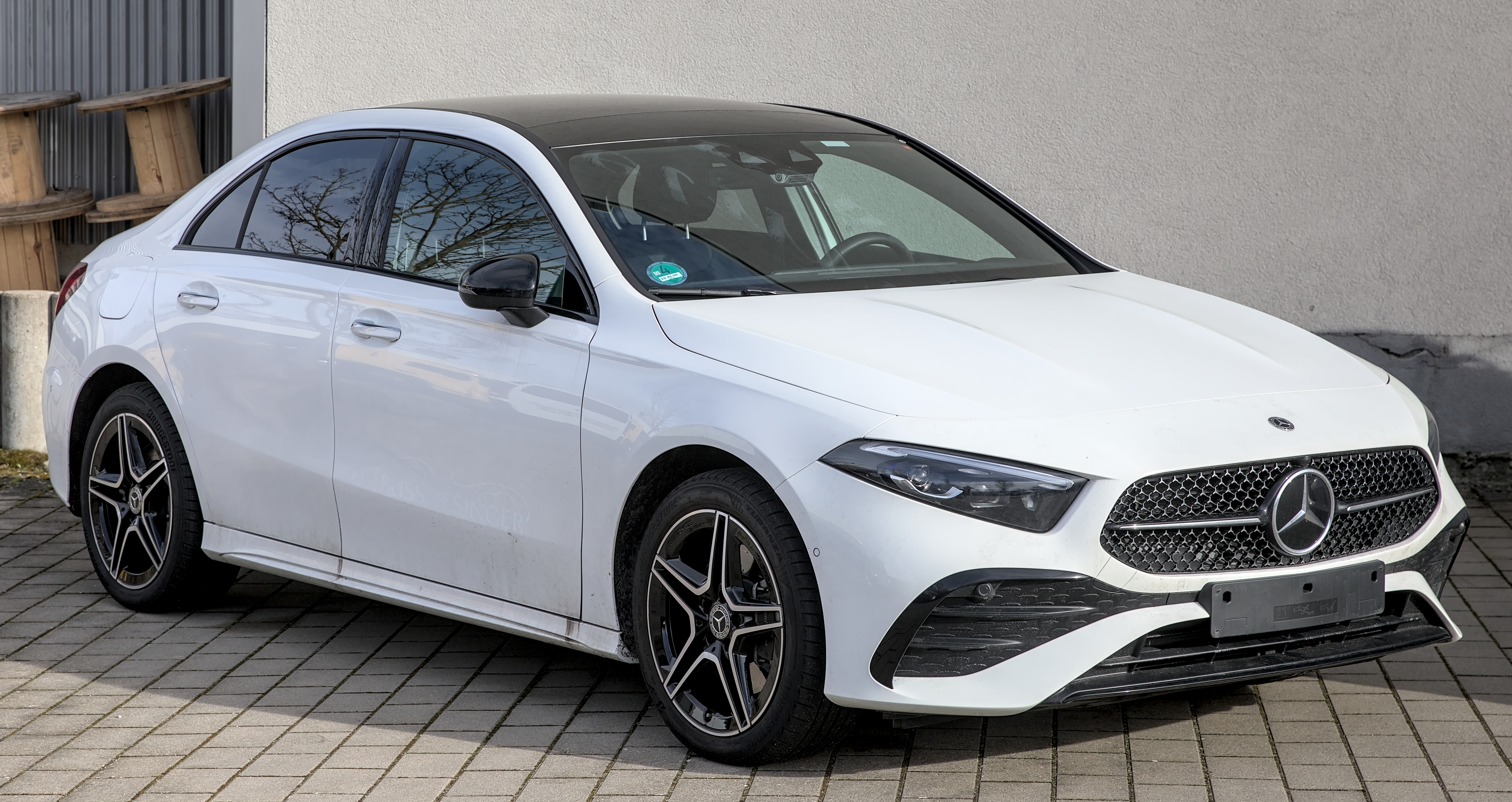
2022 Mercedes Benz A250e AMG Line sedan (facelift)

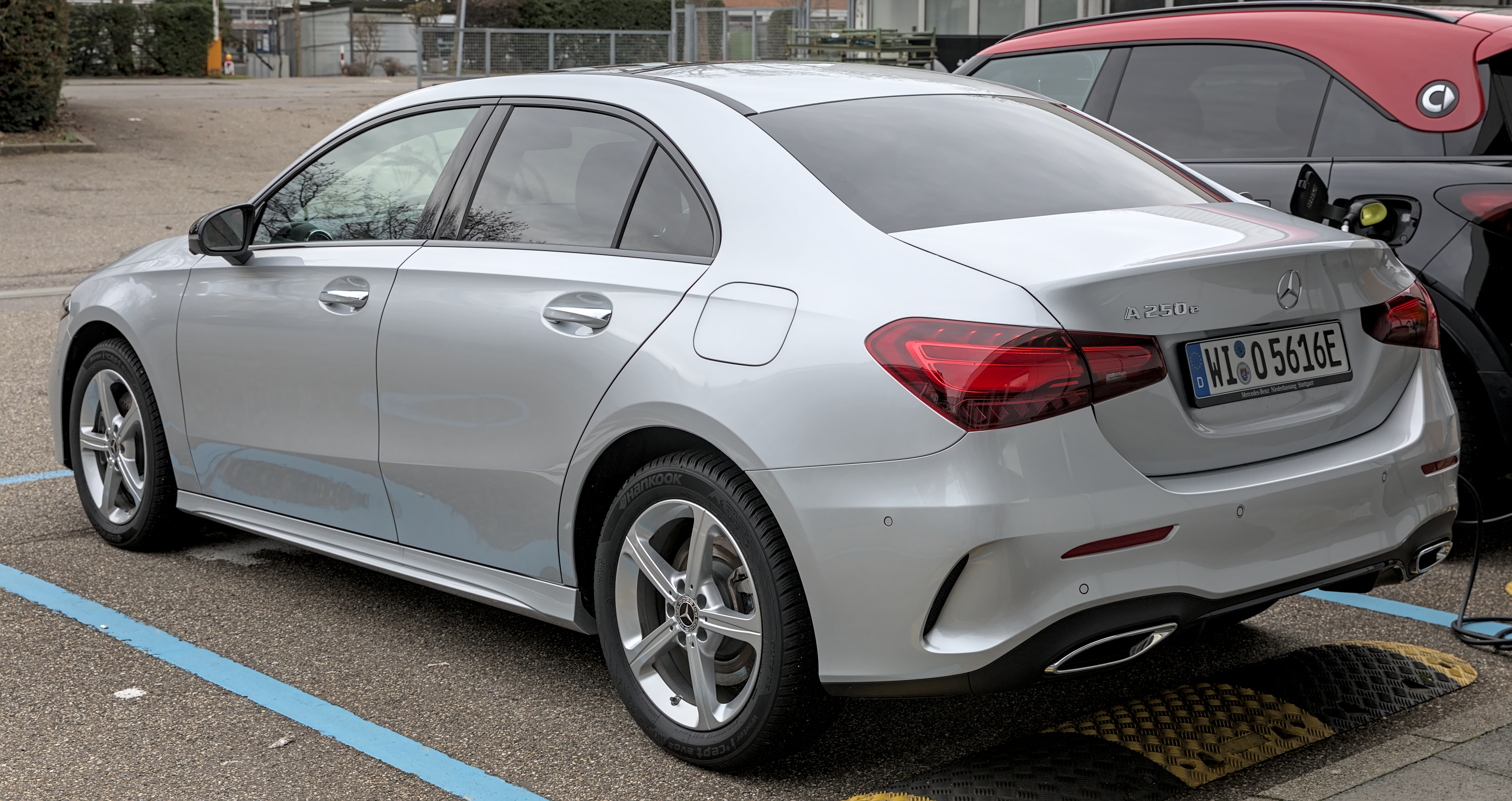
2023 Mercedes Benz A250e AMG Line sedan (facelift)

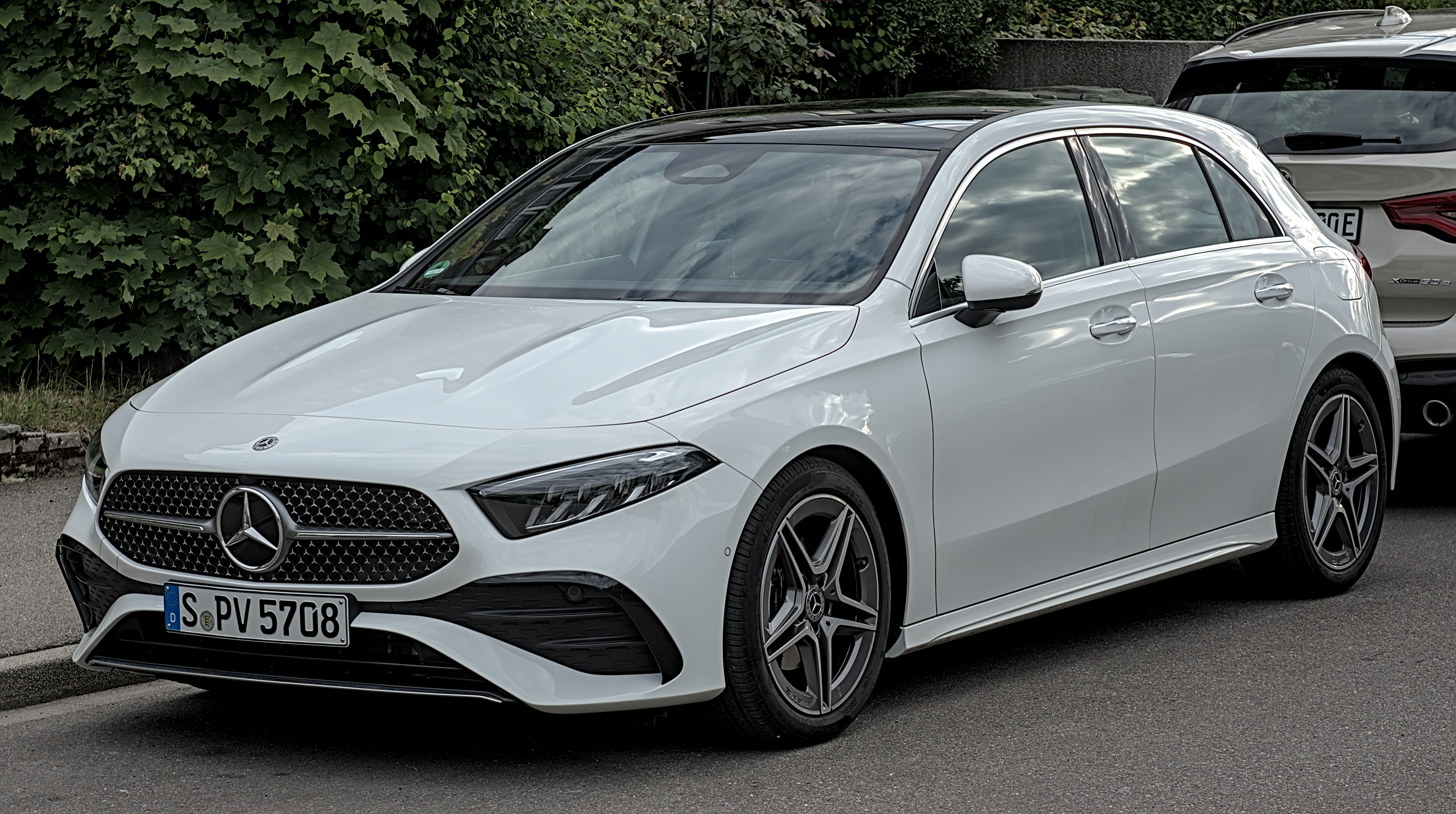
2022 Mercedes Benz A220 4Matic AMG Line hatchback (facelift)

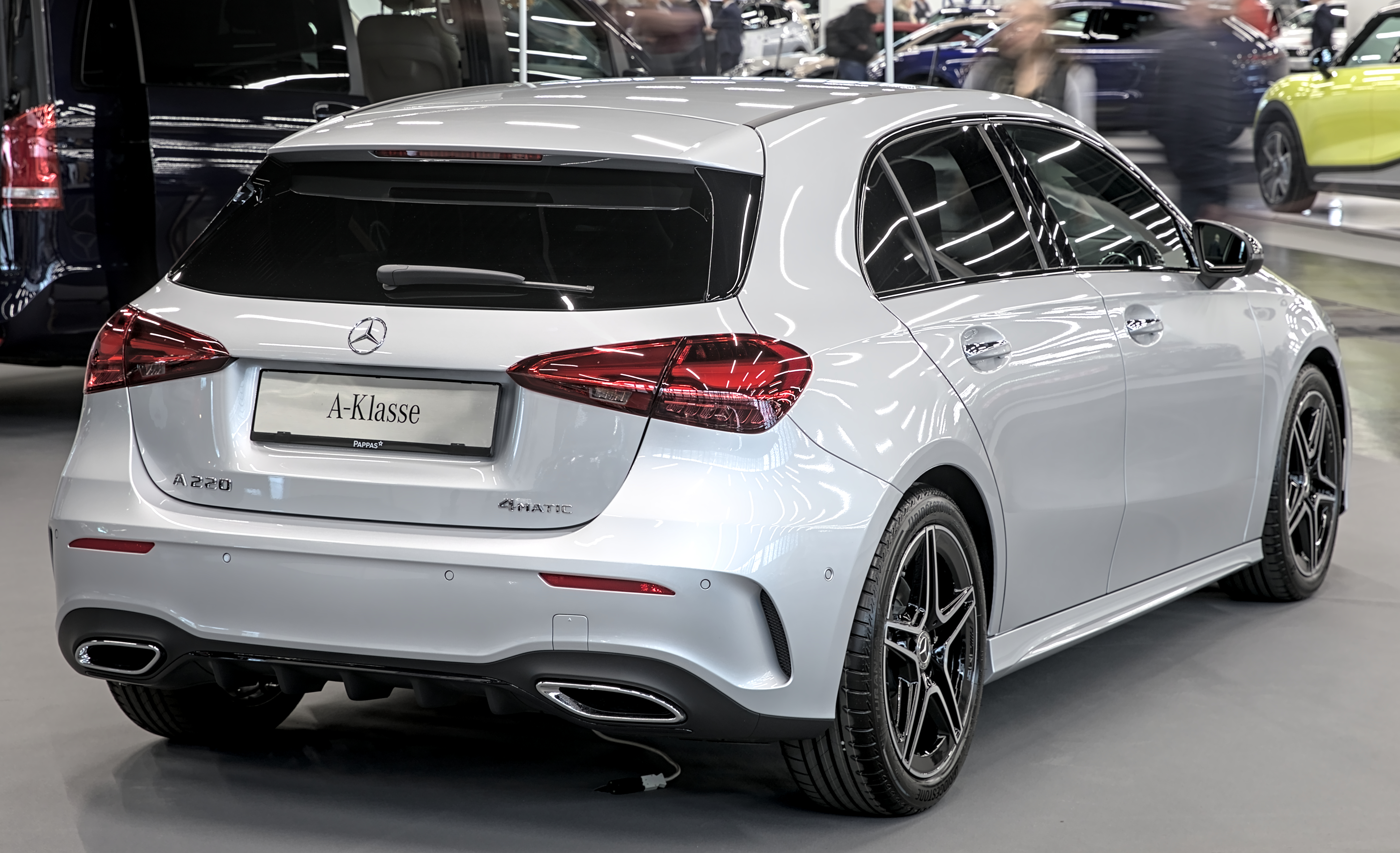
2022 Mercedes Benz A220 4Matic AMG Line hatchback (facelift)

== Technical details ==
=== Engines ===
| Model | Years | Configuration | Displacement | Power | Torque | 0–100 km/h (0–62 mph) | Top Speed | Fuel Consumption/Efficiency (EU-Norm combined) | Notes |
| Petrol engines | | | | | | | | | |
|---|---|---|---|---|---|---|---|---|---|
| A 160 | 07/2018– | I4 turbo (M282 DE14 LA) | 1,332 cc | 80 kW (109 PS; 107 hp) at 5,000 rpm | 180 N⋅m (133 lbf⋅ft) at 1,375 rpm | 10.9 seconds | 200 km/h (124 mph) | 5.0 L/100 km (47 mpg_{‑US}) | Jointly developed by Renault-Nissan-Mitsubishi Alliance and Mercedes-Benz |
| A 180 | 07/2018– | I4 turbo (M282 DE14 LA) | 1,332 cc | 100 kW (136 PS; 134 hp) at 5,000 rpm | 200 N⋅m (148 lbf⋅ft) at 1,460 rpm | 9.2 seconds | 210 km/h (130 mph) | 5.0 L/100 km (47 mpg_{‑US}) | Jointly developed by Renault-Nissan-Mitsubishi Alliance and Mercedes-Benz |
| A 200 | 05/2018– | I4 turbo (M282 DE14 LA) | 1,332 cc | 120 kW (163 PS; 161 hp) at 5,500 rpm | 250 N⋅m (184 lbf⋅ft) at 1,620 rpm | 8.0 seconds | 230 km/h (143 mph) | 5.0 L/100 km (47 mpg_{‑US}) | Jointly developed by Renault-Nissan-Mitsubishi Alliance and Mercedes-Benz |
| A 220 | 07/2018– | I4 turbo (M260 DE20 LA) | 1,991 cc | 140 kW (190 PS; 188 hp) at 5,500 rpm | 300 N⋅m (221 lbf⋅ft) at 1,800–4,000 rpm | 6.9 seconds | 240 km/h (149 mph) | 6.2–6.4 L/100 km (38–37 mpg_{‑US}) | |
| A 220 4MATIC | 07/2018– | I4 turbo (M260 DE20 LA) | 1,991 cc | 140 kW (190 PS; 188 hp) at 5,500 rpm | 300 N⋅m (221 lbf⋅ft) at 1,800–4,000 rpm | 6.9 seconds | 235 km/h (146 mph) | 6.5–6–6 L/100 km (36–39–39 mpg_{‑US}) | |
| A 250 | 05/2018– | I4 turbo (M260 DE20 LA) | 1,991 cc | 165 kW (224 PS; 221 hp) at 5,500 rpm | 350 N⋅m (258 lbf⋅ft) at 1,800–4,000 rpm | 6.2 seconds | 250 km/h (155 mph) | 6.2–6.5 L/100 km (38–36 mpg_{‑US}) | |
| A 250 4MATIC | 07/2018– | I4 turbo (M260 DE20 LA) | 1,991 cc | 165 kW (224 PS; 221 hp) at 5,500 rpm | 350 N⋅m (258 lbf⋅ft) at 1,800–4,000 rpm | 6.2 seconds | 250 km/h (155 mph) | 6.5–6.6 L/100 km (36–36 mpg_{‑US}) | |
| A 35 AMG 4MATIC | 12/2018– | I4 turbo (M260 DE20 LA) | 1,991 cc | 225 kW (306 PS; 302 hp) at 5,800-6,100 rpm | 400 N⋅m (295 lbf⋅ft) at 3,000–4,000 rpm | 4.7 seconds | 250 km/h (155 mph) | 7.3–7.4 L/100 km (32–32 mpg_{‑US}) | |
| A 45 AMG 4MATIC+ | 2020– | I4 twin-scroll turbo (M139) | 1,991 cc | 285 kW (387 PS; 382 hp) at 5,800–6,100 rpm | 480 N⋅m (354 lbf⋅ft) at 3,000–4,000 rpm | 4.0 seconds | 250 km/h (155 mph) | TBA | |
| A 45 S AMG 4MATIC+ | 2020– | I4 twin-scroll turbo (M139) | 1,991 cc | 310 kW (421 PS; 416 hp) at 5,800–6,100 rpm | 500 N⋅m (369 lbf⋅ft) at 3,000–4,000 rpm | 3.9 seconds | 270 km/h (168 mph) | 8.3–8.4 L/100 km (28–28 mpg_{‑US}) | |
| Diesel engines | | | | | | | | | |
| A 180 d | 05/2018–12/2020 | I4 turbo (OM 608 DE 15 SCR) | 1,461 cc | 85 kW (116 PS; 114 hp) at 4,000 rpm | 260 N⋅m (192 lbf⋅ft) at 1,750-2,750 rpm | 10.6 seconds | 202 km/h (126 mph) | 4.1–4.3 L/100 km (57–55 mpg_{‑US}) | Produced by Renault |
| A 200 d | 11/2018– | I4 turbo (OM 654 DE 20 SCR) | 1,950 cc | 110 kW (150 PS; 148 hp) at 4,500 rpm | 320 N⋅m (236 lbf⋅ft) at 1,400-3,200 rpm | 8.1 seconds | 220 km/h (137 mph) | 4.0–4.3 L/100 km (59–55 mpg_{‑US}) | |
| A 220 d | 11/2018– | I4 turbo (OM 654 DE 20 SCR) | 1,950 cc | 140 kW (190 PS; 188 hp) at 4,500 rpm | 400 N⋅m (295 lbf⋅ft) at 1,600-2,600 rpm | 7.0 seconds | 235 km/h (146 mph) | 4.3–4.5 L/100 km (55–52 mpg_{‑US}) | |
| Plug-in hybrid engines | | | | | | | | | |
| A 250 e | 08/2019– | I4 turbo (M282 DE14 LA) | 1,332 cc | 116 kW (158 PS; 156 bhp) (Engine); 75 kW (102 PS; 101 bhp) (Electric); 160 kW (218 PS; 215 bhp) (Combined) | 250 N⋅m (184 lbf⋅ft) (Engine); 300 N⋅m (221 lbf⋅ft) (Electric); 450 N⋅m (332 lbf⋅ft) (Combined) | 6.6 seconds | 235 km/h (146 mph) | 1.4–1.5 L/100 km (170–160 mpg_{‑US}) | Jointly developed by Renault-Nissan-Mitsubishi Alliance and Mercedes-Benz |

=== Transmissions ===
| Model | Years | Types |
Petrol engines
| A 160 | 07/2018–present | 6-speed manual |
| A 180 | 07/2018–present | 6-speed manual, 7-speed automatic 7G-DCT |
| A 200 | 05/2018–present | 6-speed manual, 7-speed automatic 7G-DCT |
| A 220 | 07/2018–present | 7-speed automatic 7G-DCT |
| A 220 4MATIC | 07/2018–present | 7-speed automatic 7G-DCT |
| A 250 | 05/2018–present | 7-speed automatic 7G-DCT |
| A 250 4MATIC | 07/2018–present | 7-speed automatic 7G-DCT |
| A 35 AMG | 12/2018–present | 7-speed automatic AMG SPEEDSHIFT DCT 7G |
| A 45 AMG | 2020–present | 8-speed automatic AMG SPEEDSHIFT DCT 8G |
| A 45 S AMG | 2020–present | 8-speed automatic AMG SPEEDSHIFT DCT 8G |
Diesel engines
| A 160 d | 05/2019–present | 6-speed manual |
| A 180 d | 05/2018–12/2020 | 6-speed manual, 7-speed automatic 7G-DCT |
| A 180 d | 12/2020–present | 6-speed manual, 8-speed automatic 8G-DCT |
| A 200 d | 11/2018–present | 8-speed automatic 8G-DCT |
| A 220 d | 11/2018–present | 8-speed automatic 8G-DCT |
Plug-in hybrid engines
| A 250 e | 05/2018–present | 8-speed automatic 8F-DCT |

== Safety ==
The 2018 A-Class scored five stars overall in its Euro NCAP test.

Euro NCAP test results Mercedes-Benz A180d, LHD (2018)
| Test | Points | % |
|---|---|---|
| Overall: | 5 /5 stars | |
| Adult occupant: | 36.5 | 96% |
| Child occupant: | 45.0 | 91% |
| Pedestrian: | 44.2 | 92% |
| Safety assist: | 9.8 | 75% |

ANCAP test results Mercedes-Benz A-Class all petrol variants (2018, aligned with Euro NCAP)
| Test | Points | % |
|---|---|---|
| Overall: | 5 /5 stars | |
| Adult occupant: | 36.5 | 96% |
| Child occupant: | 44.9 | 91% |
| Pedestrian: | 44.2 | 92% |
| Safety assist: | 9.6 | 73% |

== Awards ==
- 2018 AA Driven New Zealand 'Car of the Year'
- 2019 What Car? 'Safety Award'
- 2019 AutoTrader South African 'Car of the Year'
- 2019 CarBuyer 'Best Small Luxury Car'
