= Mercedes-Benz E-Class (W213) =

Fifth generation of Mercedes-Benz E-Class (2016–2023)

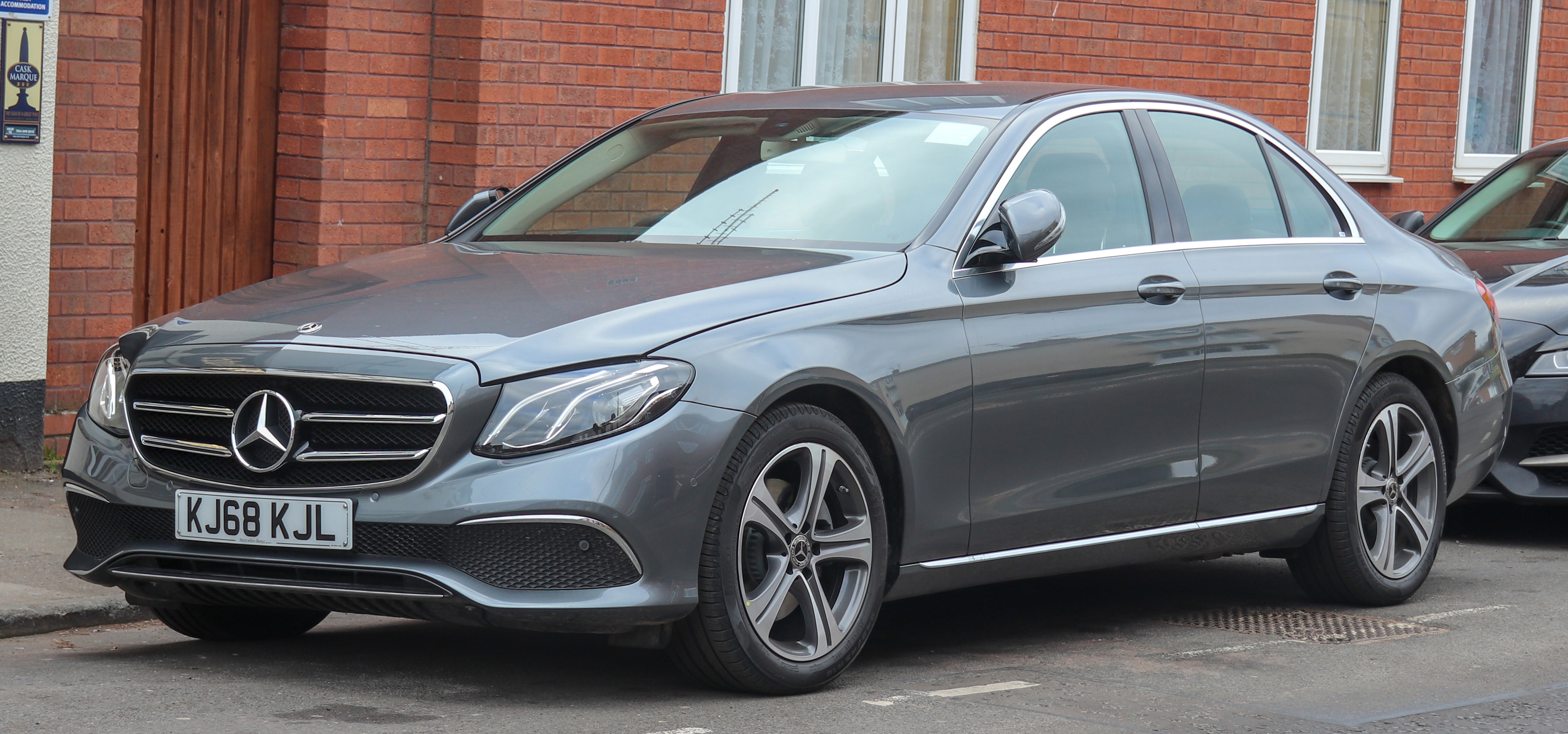

Overview
- Manufacturer: Daimler AG (2016–2022); Mercedes-Benz Group (2022–2023)
- Production: February 2016 – 2023
- Model years: 2017–2023
- Assembly: Germany: Sindelfingen (saloon, estate); Germany: Bremen (coupé, cabriolet); China: Beijing (Beijing Benz); India: Chakan, Pune (Mercedes-Benz India); Indonesia: Bogor Regency (Mercedes-Benz Indonesia); Malaysia: Pekan (DRB-HICOM); Thailand: Samut Prakan (TAAP); Vietnam: Ho Chi Minh City (MBV); Russia: Solnechnogorsk (Mercedes-Benz Manufacturing Rus)
- Designer: Drummond Jacoy; Robert Lešnik

Body and chassis
- Class: Executive car (E); Grand tourer (S) (C238)/(A238)
- Body style: 4-door saloon 5-door estate 2-door coupé (C238); 2-door cabriolet (A238)
- Layout: Front-engine, rear-wheel-drive or all-wheel-drive (4Matic)
- Platform: MRA
- Related: Mercedes-Benz C-Class (W205); Mercedes-Benz CLS-Class (C257); Mercedes-AMG GT 4-Door Coupé

Powertrain
- Engine: Petrol: 1.5 L M264 turbo I4; 1.6 L M274 turbo I4; 2.0 L M264 turbo I4; 2.0 L M274 turbo I4; 3.0 L M256 turbo I6; 3.0 L M276 twin-turbo V6; 4.0 L M177 AMG twin-turbo V8; Petrol plug-in hybrid: 2.0 L M139 mild hybrid turbo I4; 2.0 L M270 plug-in hybrid turbo I4; 3.0 L M256 mild hybrid turbo I6; Diesel: 1.6–2.0 L OM654 turbo I4; 2.0 L OM654 plug-in hybrid turbo I4; 2.9 L OM656 turbo I6; 3.0 L OM642 turbo V6
- Electric motor: 27 hp (20.1 kW) 120-volt compact electric motor (BlueTEC HYBRID); 16 kW (21.5 hp) BorgWarner 48V eBooster Electric Starter-Generator Motor (EQ Boost); 65 kW (87.2 hp) Schaeffler PSM P2 Hybrid Module High Voltage (E350 e); 122 PS (120.3 hp; 89.7 kW) Schaeffler PSM P2 Hybrid Module High Voltage (E300 e/E300 de)
- Transmission: 6-speed manual (E200 only until April 2018); 9-speed 9G-Tronic automatic
- Hybrid drivetrain: Parallel hybrid (E300 Bluetec Hybrid); Mild-Hybrid (EQ Boost); Plug-in hybrid (E350 e/E300 e/E300 de)
- Battery: 0.8 kWh Lithium-ion (Bluetec Hybrid); 6.2 kWh lithium-ion (E350e); 13.5 kWh lithium-ion (E300e/E300de)

Dimensions
- Wheelbase: 2,939 mm (115.7 in) (2017: Sedan SWB); 3,079 mm (121.2 in) (2017: Sedan LWB); 2,873 mm (113.1 in) (coupé (C238) / cabriolet (A238); 2,939 mm (115.7 in) (2017: Wagon)
- Length: 4,923 mm (193.8 in) (2017: Sedan SWB); 5,065 mm (199.4 in) (2017: Sedan LWB); 4,844 mm (190.7 in) (coupé (C238) / cabriolet (A238); 4,932 mm (194.2 in) - 5,005 mm (197.0 in) (2017: Wagon)
- Width: 1,852 mm (72.9 in) (2017: Sedan SWB); 1,860 mm (73.2 in) (2017: Sedan LWB); 1,860 mm (73.2 in) (coupé (C238) / cabriolet (A238)
- Height: 1,468 mm (57.8 in) (2017: Sedan SWB); 1,467 mm (57.8 in) (2017: Sedan LWB); 1,430 mm (56.3 in) (coupé (C238) / cabriolet (A238)
- Curb weight: 1,605–2,048 kg (3,538–4,515 lb) (2017: Sedan SWB); 1,770–1,800 kg (3,900–3,970 lb) (2017: Sedan LWB)

Chronology
- Predecessor: Mercedes-Benz E-Class (W212) (Sedan & Estate); Mercedes-Benz E-Class (C207/A207) (Coupé & Cabriolet)
- Successor: Mercedes-Benz E-Class (W214) (Sedan & Estate); Mercedes-Benz CLE-Class (Coupé & Cabriolet)

The W213 Mercedes-Benz E-Class is the fifth generation of the Mercedes-Benz E-Class, sold from 2016 as a 2017 model. It succeeded the W212/S212 E-Class models. The coupe/convertible models share the same platform as the sedan/wagon, in contrast to the previous generation. The high-performance Mercedes-AMG E 63 and E 63 S versions of the W213 have been available as well from 2016 (as a 2017 model), and these are the only versions with V8 engines.

Since the mid-1990s, the Mercedes-Benz E-Class has been equipped with quad headlights and a differentiated design compared to the C-Class and S-Class. With the 2017 model, Mercedes decided to take a more streamlined direction, first seen with the 2014 E-Class mid-generational refresh and then going in an entirely new direction with the all-new 2017 model.

Launched in spring 2016 following a world debut at the 2016 North American International Auto Show in January, the 2017 E-Class was the most technologically advanced car Mercedes had ever produced at the time. This generation of the Mercedes E-Class has won many plaudits from automotive publications, including the 2021 Motor Trend Car of the Year, the first time Mercedes-Benz has ever won this award.

== Development and launch ==
The whole development process stretched over 48 months. In that time, Mercedes-Benz produced 1,200 prototypes and drove a combined 12 million kilometres in some of the world's toughest conditions, from sub-zero temperatures in the snow through to the world's hottest deserts. In testing the car, Mercedes-Benz also had its prototypes conduct over 10,000 autonomous braking procedures and 5,000 automated lane changes as part of the Distronic suite of semi-autonomous driving features. Moreover, it took 1,200 engineers to make the fifth-generation E-Class.

The W213 E-Class was unveiled at the 2016 North American International Auto Show. The 2017 E-Class has a design similar to that of the larger W222 S-Class and the smaller W205 C-Class. While its predecessor had a tighter surface and harder edges, the 2017 model is curvier and more flowing. An official design sketch was released in late December 2015, which confirmed that the new E-Class mirrors the styling of the C-Class and S-Class. Official photos of the 2017 E-Class were leaked on the internet on 4 January 2016 ahead of its unveiling.

The W213 was first released in the saloon configuration, which went on sale in the summer of 2016. The Estate, offering a similar 695-litre luggage capacity to its predecessor, went to sale towards the end of 2016. A two-door Coupe arrived in 2017, before the Convertible completes the line-up towards the end of 2017. The W213 E-Class was deemed one of Car and Driver's "10 Best vehicles" in 2019.

== Design ==
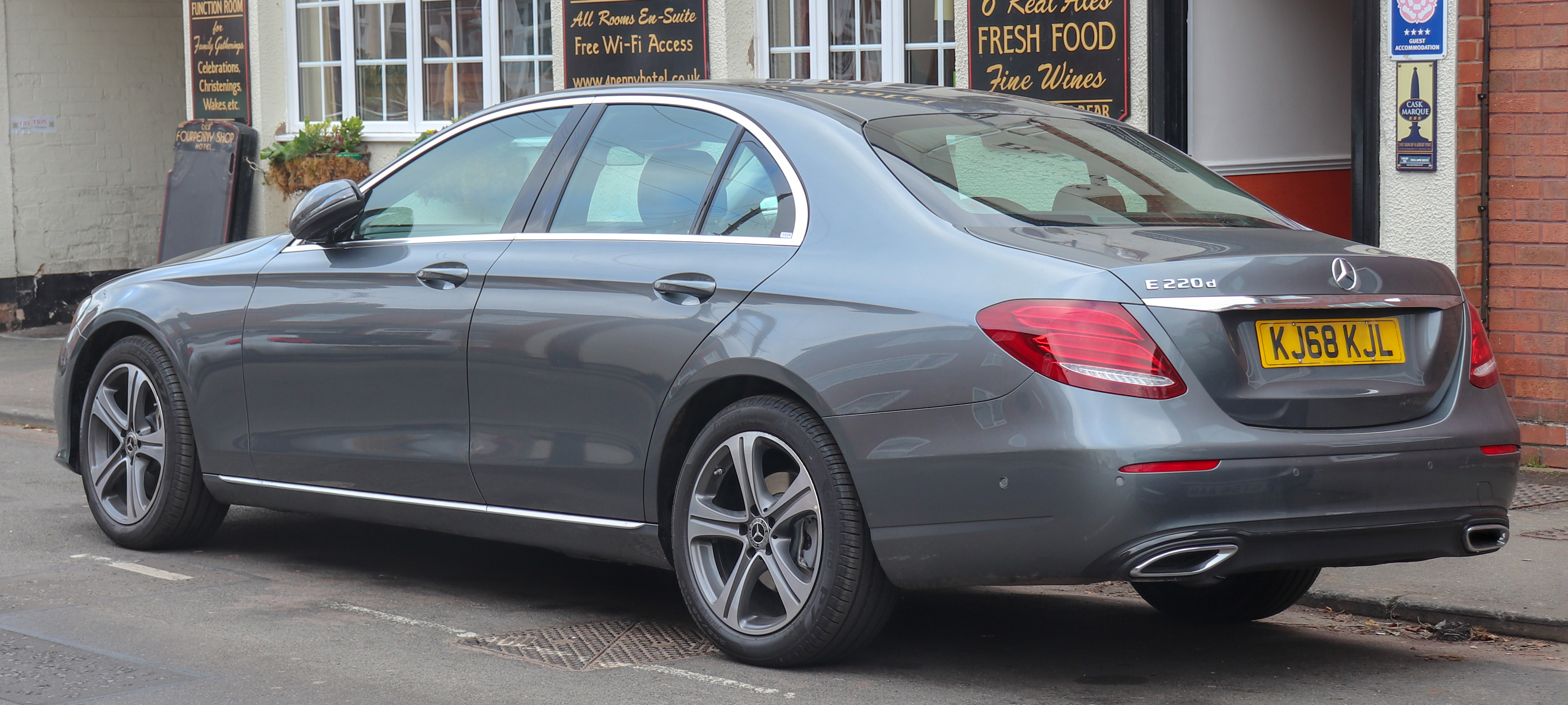
Sedan (W213)

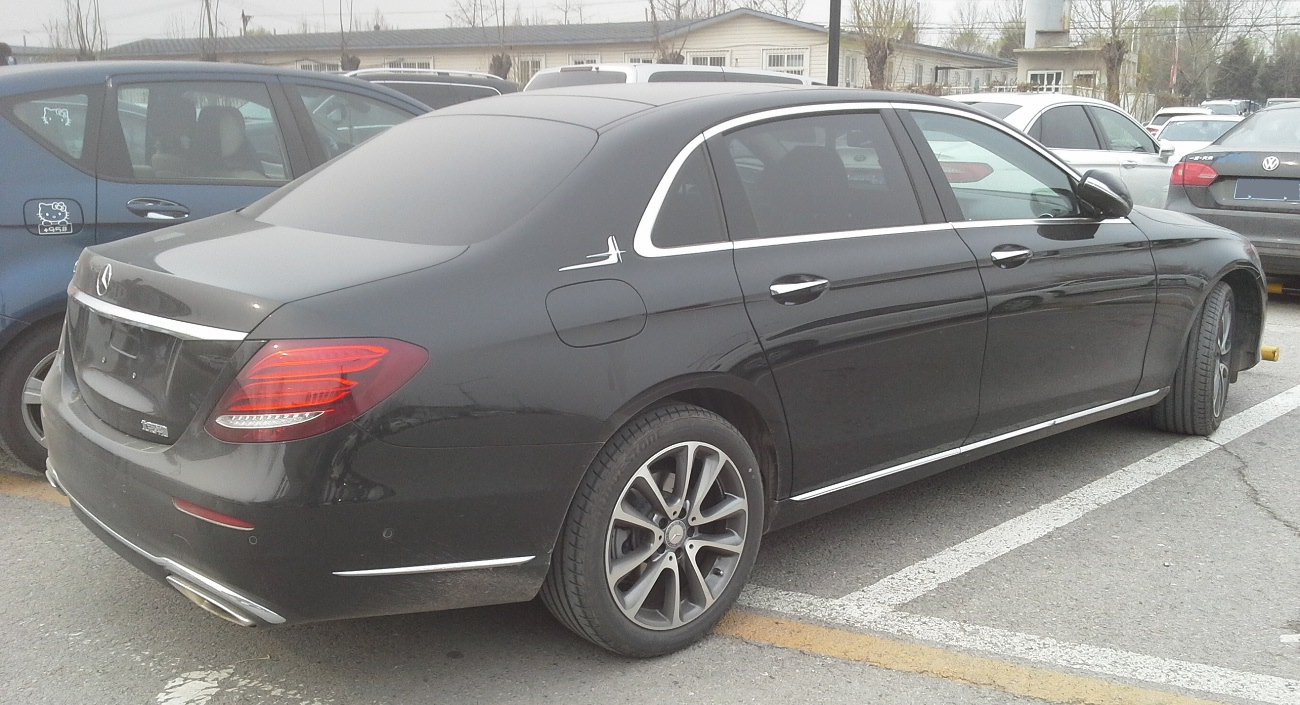
Sedan (long wheelbase) (V213)

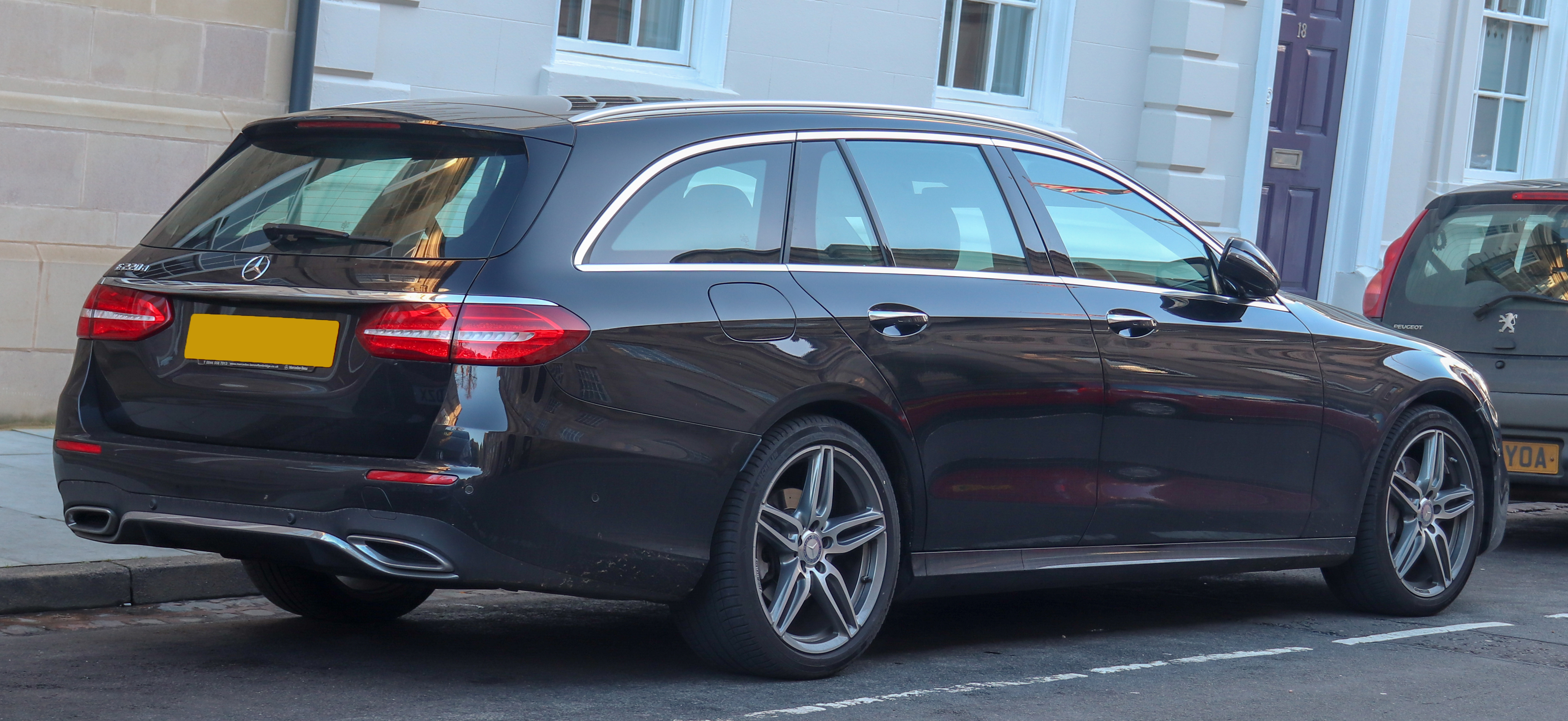
Station wagon (S213)

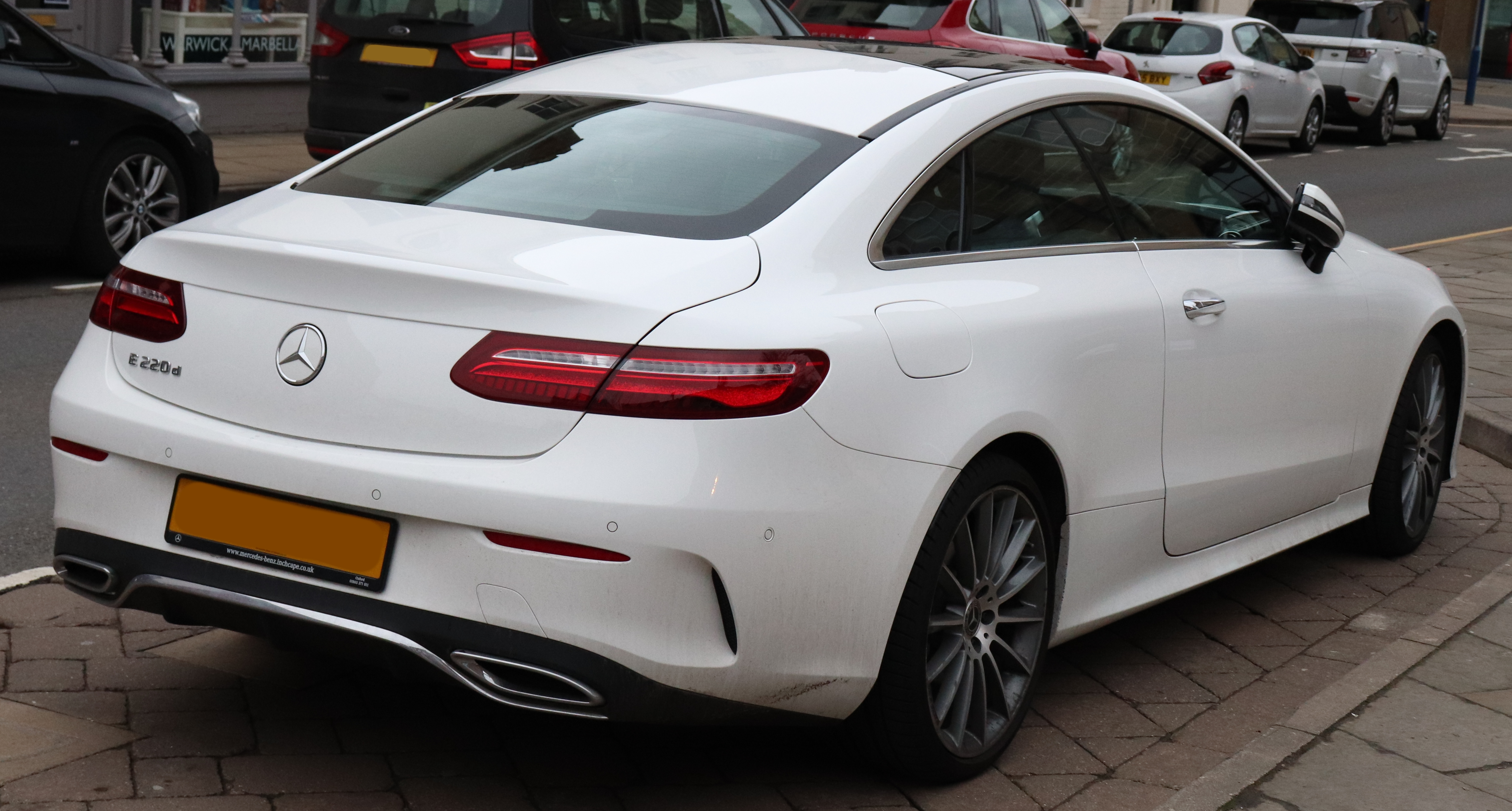
Coupe (C238)

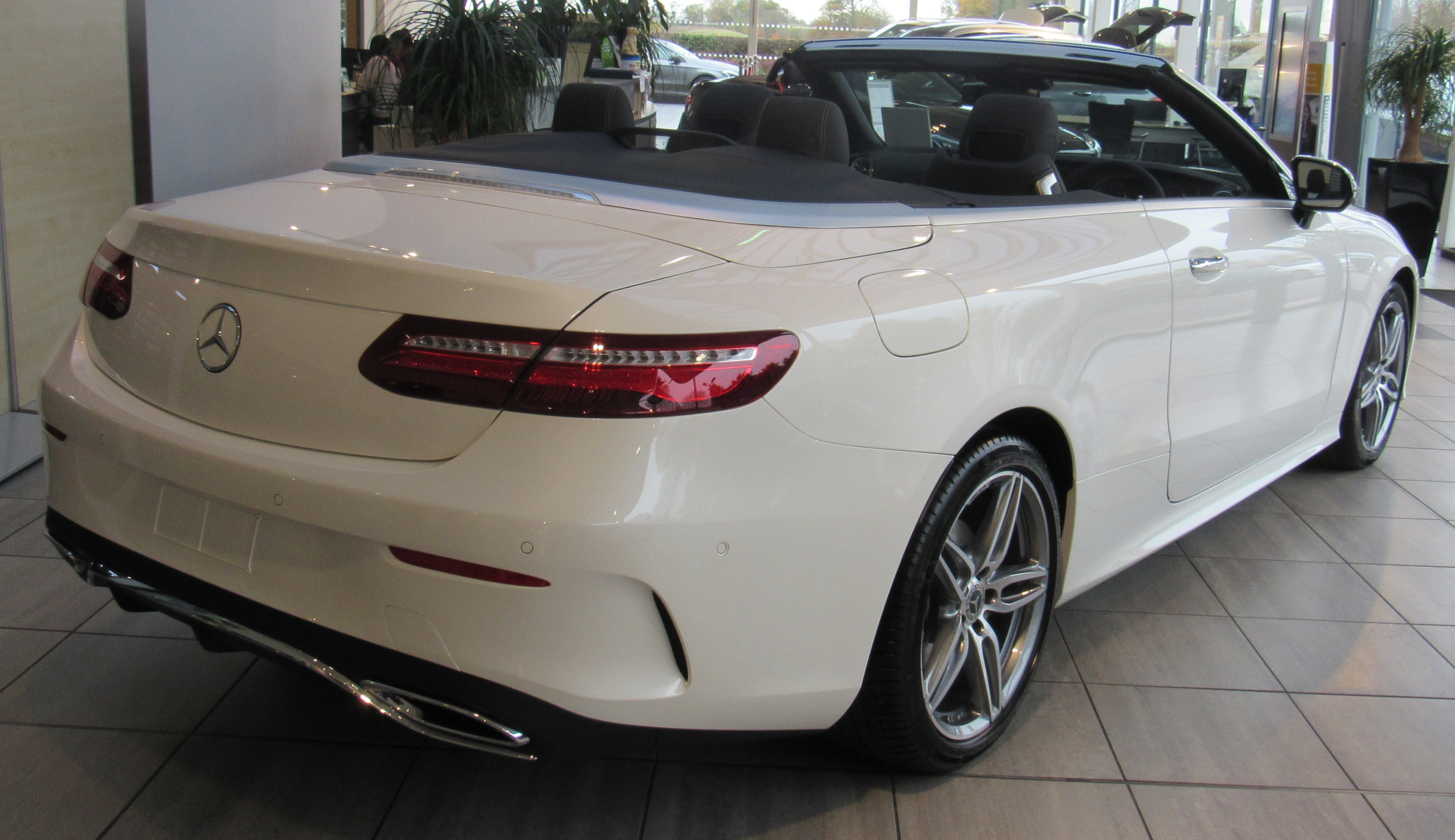
Cabriolet (A238)

Stylistically, the 2017 E-Class followed the latest C-Class, the GLA, and the S-Class coupé. Its front end features Mercedes’ familiar bullet-shaped headlights and an upright grille, while its rear end gets a pair of LED taillights, with similarities to the 2014 E-Class models, that extend into the quarter panels. As on other recent models, the 2017 E-Class features two distinct front-end treatments: a traditional chrome grille and a more sporting blade grille. The aerodynamic efficiency have been refined as the drag coefficient improved from 0.25 in the previous model to a class-leading 0.23.

=== W212 facelift comparison ===
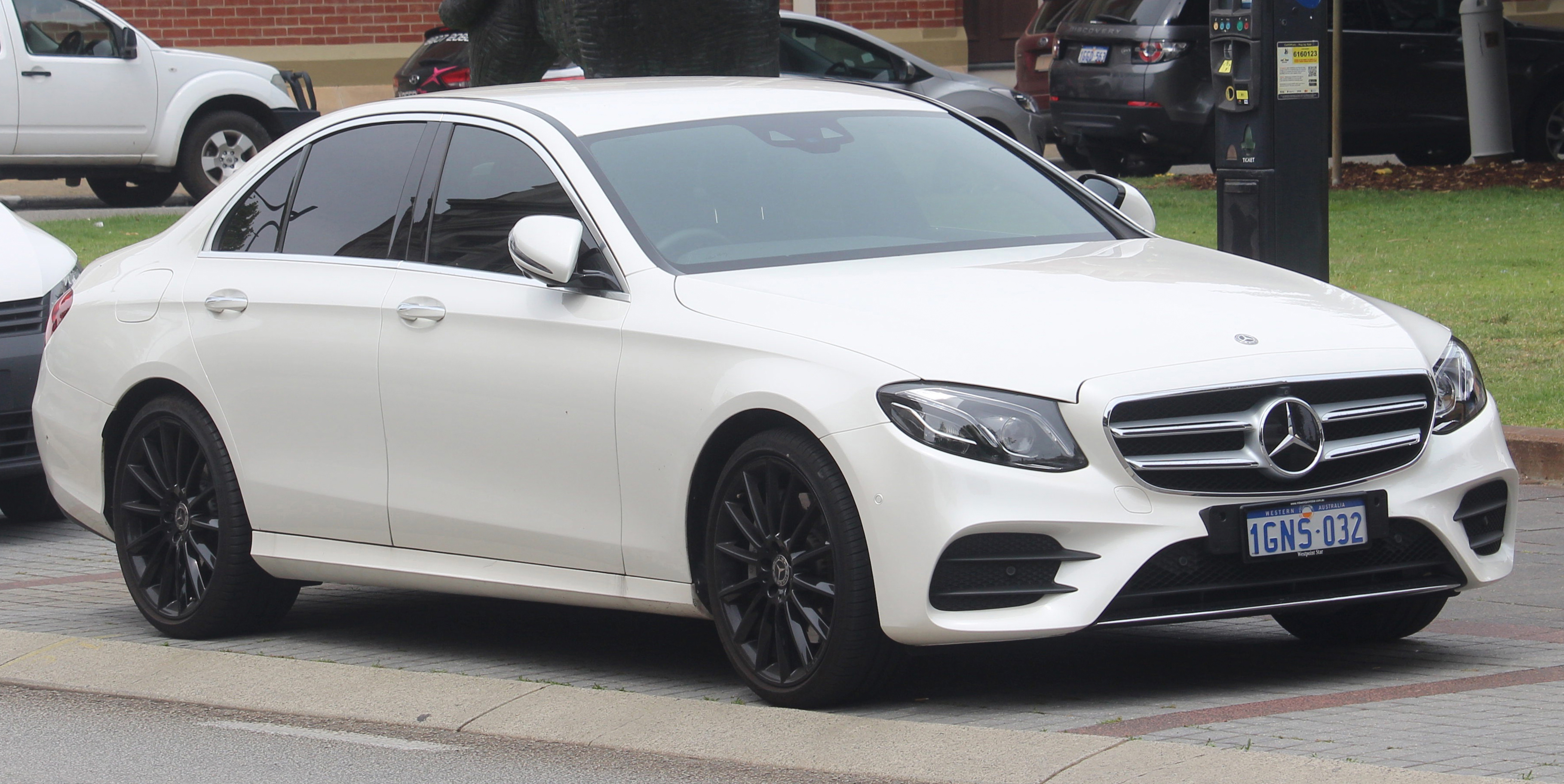
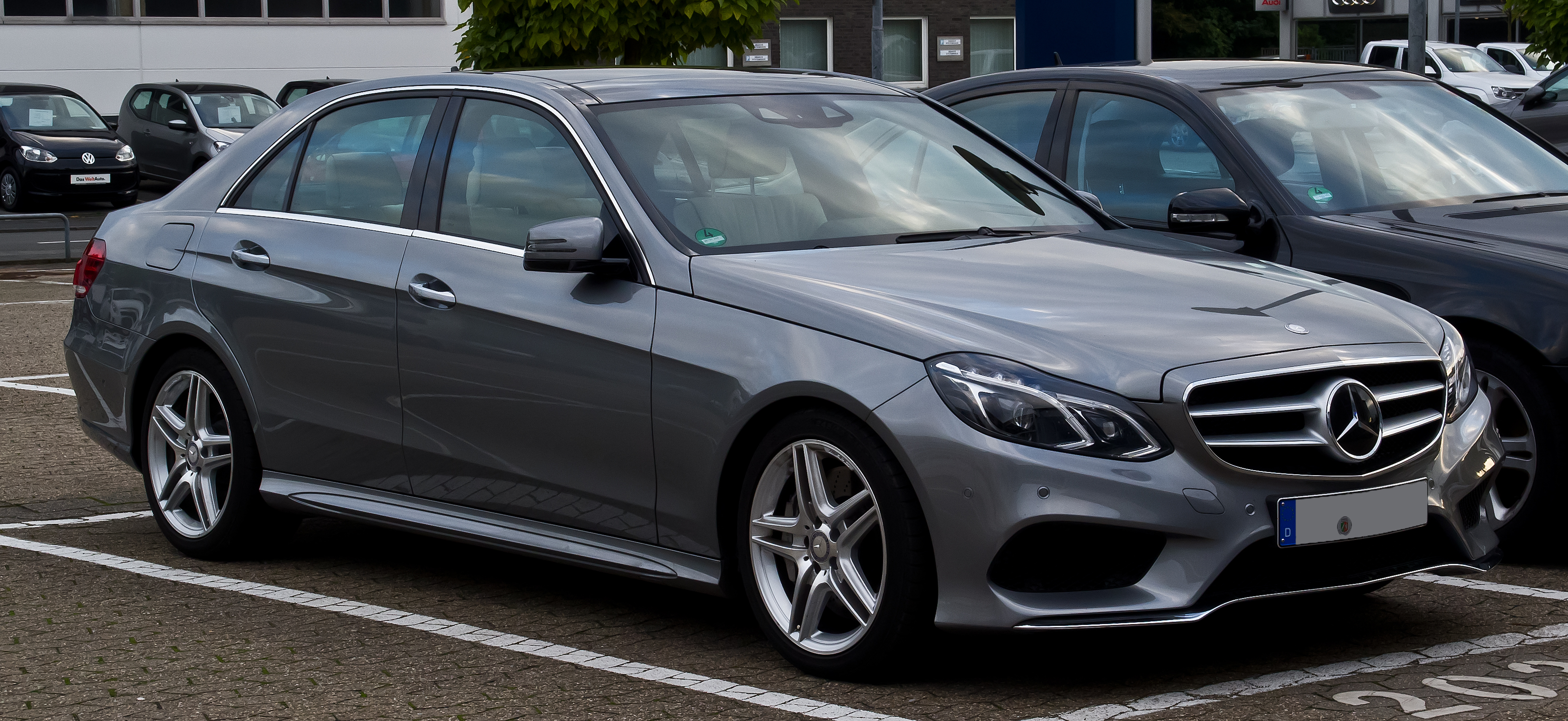
Comparison between the W213 E-Class (left) and W212 E-Class facelift (right)

The W213 adopts Mercedes’ modular MRA platform, as used by the contemporary C-Class and S-Class models. The W213 E-Class grew 43 mm in length to 4,923 mm (194 in). Wheelbase was also extended 65 mm to 2,939 mm (116 in), resulting in shorter overhangs. It is 2 mm narrower and 6 mm lower than its predecessor. The increased use of high-strength steel and aluminium is claimed to make the car up to 100 kg lighter than the W212 E-Class.

The W213 E-Class is based on the F800 Style design language, previously used on the larger W222 S-Class (2013) and the smaller W205 C-Class (2014). However, the facelifted W212 (2013) also incorporates several design cues from the F800 Style, thus the two vehicles share several design traits.

The W213 E-Class' front bumper is reminiscent of the facelifted W212's optional sport kit (dubbed the AMG Sports Package), as it is governed by two air intakes united by a mesh grille. Compared to the standard front bumper of the W212, which is similar to the one used on the W205 C-Class, the W213 E-Class' proposal is more aggressive, composed and simple. The classic iconic grille, has simpler, flowing lines, with a more imposing presence on W213, while the sport variant (with the big logo in the middle) isn't so different from the W212. The S-Class inspired, sweptback (first time in Mercedes executive-class history) and rather compact headlights are the styling feature of the W213 model.

On both cars the doors sit pretty high, squeezing the windows, but the W212 masks this "trait" with a subtle slope towards the headlights. In fact, on the profile of the facelifted W212, it still retains the edgy lines that came out in 2009. At the back, the W213 adopted a fresh design for the lights similar to the S-Class. However, the tailpipes finishers are similar to the ones found on the W212, with the rear bumper keeping its overall shape.

=== Interior ===
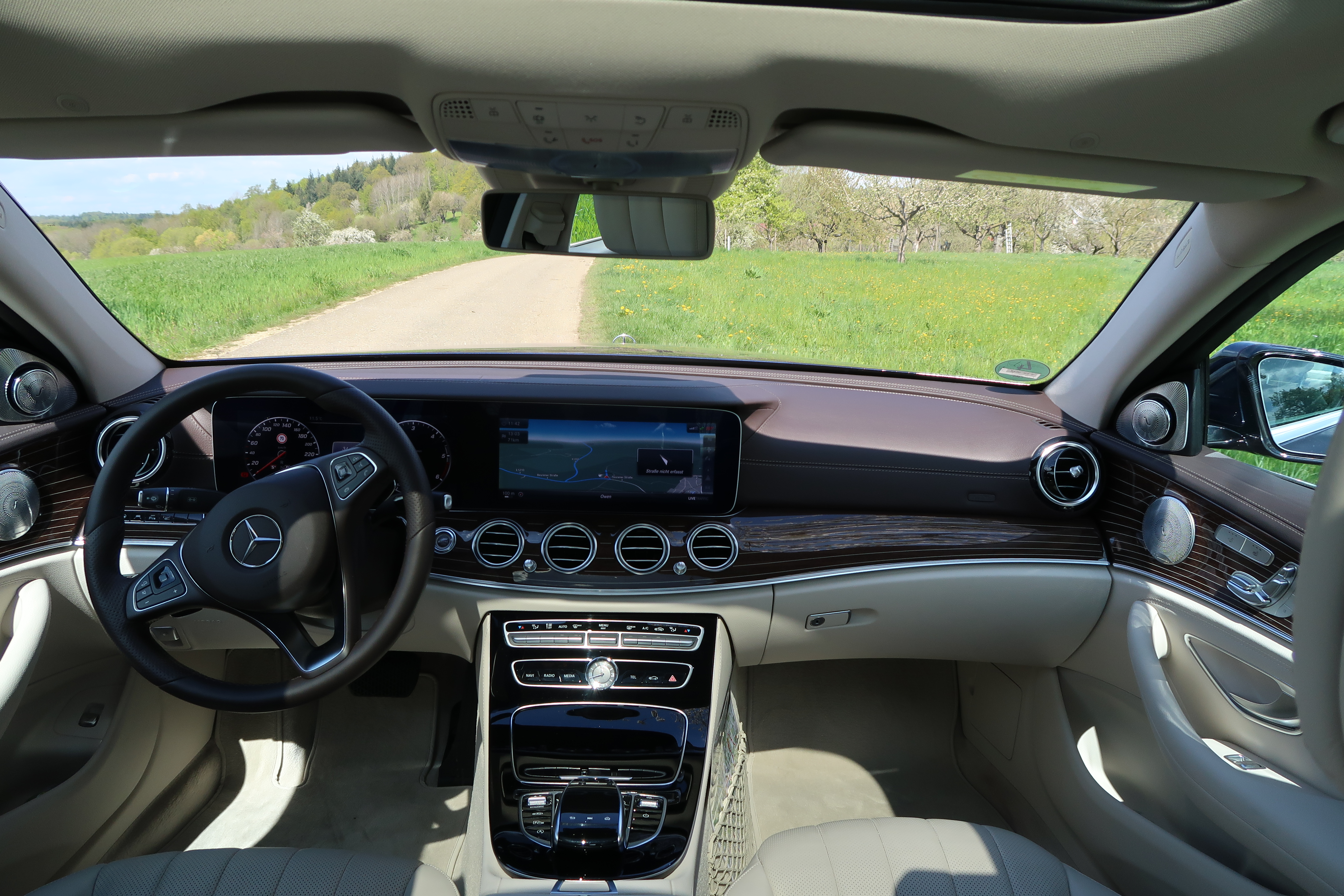
The interior with two 12.3-inch full HD screens housed within a single unit.

The interior of the 2017 E-Class was unveiled by Mercedes-Benz in December 2015, which was previewed on the Concept IAA (Intelligent Aerodynamic Automobile) that Mercedes showed in September 2015 at the Frankfurt Auto show. The interior mounts two 12.3-inch full HD screens housed within a single unit. Most E-Class models receive the widescreen set-up as standard. However, base Avantgarde versions features traditional analogue dials with a seven-inch multi-information display, along with an 8.4-inch central infotainment screen. Mercedes-Benz claimed a first for the automotive industry, adding a pair of touch-sensitive control buttons on the steering wheel, which respond to finger swipes to control the car's infotainment system. The more traditional Mercedes-Benz COMAND controller is also retained on the centre console.

== Equipment ==
=== Autonomous driving ===
A number of sensors, cameras and radars has allowed semi-automated driving. There may be fewer sensors than before (12 and four respectively over the W212 model), but they all feature increased functionality which reduces cost and complexity.

The next level of Drive Pilot (code-named Intelligent Drive) featured on the 2017 E-Class enables the car to negotiate bends on the motorway, while maintaining a safe distance from slower moving vehicles in front at up to speeds of 130 mph (210 km/h). The system is not a hands-free operation and an audible alert will prompt the driver into regaining control if the car detects their attention has wandered.

The Steering Pilot function uses visible road markings to navigate bends at speeds of up to 81 mph (130 km/h). The car is able to scan the surrounding area, as well as the car in front, if road markings are unclear to maintain lane discipline. The system is also able to automatically increase or decrease the E-Class's speed by reading speed limit signs if the driver fails to take any action.

=== Safety innovations ===
Active Brake Assist and Evasive Steering Assist work in tandem to warn of and prevent potential collisions in the 2017 E-Class. The first system now features increased functionality, able to provide visible warning of potential danger as well as being able to automatically apply the brakes in an emergency. The system is now also able to detect and analyze moving traffic at junctions ahead. Evasive Steering Assist can detect when a driver is making an evasive action and apply additional steering force to ensure the pedestrian or vehicle is avoided. Car-to-X Communication is another safety system which enables vehicles on the same road to warn each other of upcoming potential hazards or accidents.

If an unavoidable side collision is detected, PRE-SAFE Impulse Side rapidly inflates the side bolster to move the occupant away from the point of impact, while at the same time PRE-SAFE Sound pumps noise waves through the speakers to reduce hearing damage following a collision.

=== Adaptive LED matrix lighting ===
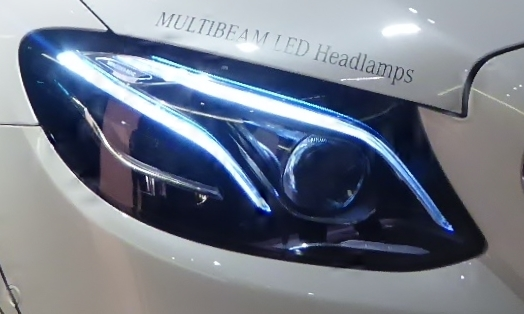
Adaptive LED matrix lighting

Introduced on the CLS for 2014, Mercedes’ Multibeam LED headlamps are enhanced for the 2017 E-class. The individual LED count increases from 24 to 84, each individually controllable—switching between high- and low-beams, and the curve-following adaptive-lighting functions are now achieved entirely via electronics. The light pattern is also altered in city driving or via information from the navigation system.

As with the mid-cycle refresh of W212, the 2017 E-Class features two larger units instead of the four-eyes headlights, though LED light bars within the headlamps still gives the night-time effect of four individual units.

=== Drift mode ===
Introduced in the Mercedes-AMG E 63 S 4MATIC+, drift mode allows the car to completely cut the front axle from its all-wheel-drive 4MATIC system and transfer all of the power to the rear axle of the car. This allows the driver to engage in easier drifts.

== Variants ==
=== Coupé and Cabriolet ===
The Coupé (C238) was first unveiled by Mercedes at the 2017 North American International Auto Show, while the Cabriolet (A238) was unveiled at the 2017 Geneva International Motor Show, both to be released for the 2018 model year. Both models replaced the previous C207/A207 E-Class models. Like the E-Class coupé it replaced, the C238 coupé features a pillarless design with no B pillar between the front and rear side windows, though there is a small pillar between the main rear windows and the fixed quarter glass windows behind them.

The Coupé and Cabriolet were both initially offered in 2018 only as an E 400 model with the M276 3.0L Biturbo V6 engine producing 333 PS (328 hp; 245 kW) and 480 N⋅m (354 lb⋅ft) of torque.

Select markets also offered the E 200 model with an M274 engine 2.0L turbo I4 engine producing 184 PS (181 hp; 135 kW), and the E 300 model with an M274 2.0L turbo I4 engine producing 245 PS (242 hp; 180 kW).

For 2019 onwards, the E 400 model was replaced by the E 450 model, featuring the same M276 3.0-litre Biturbo V6 engine, but now producing 362 PS (357 hp; 266 kW) and 500 N⋅m (369 lb⋅ft).

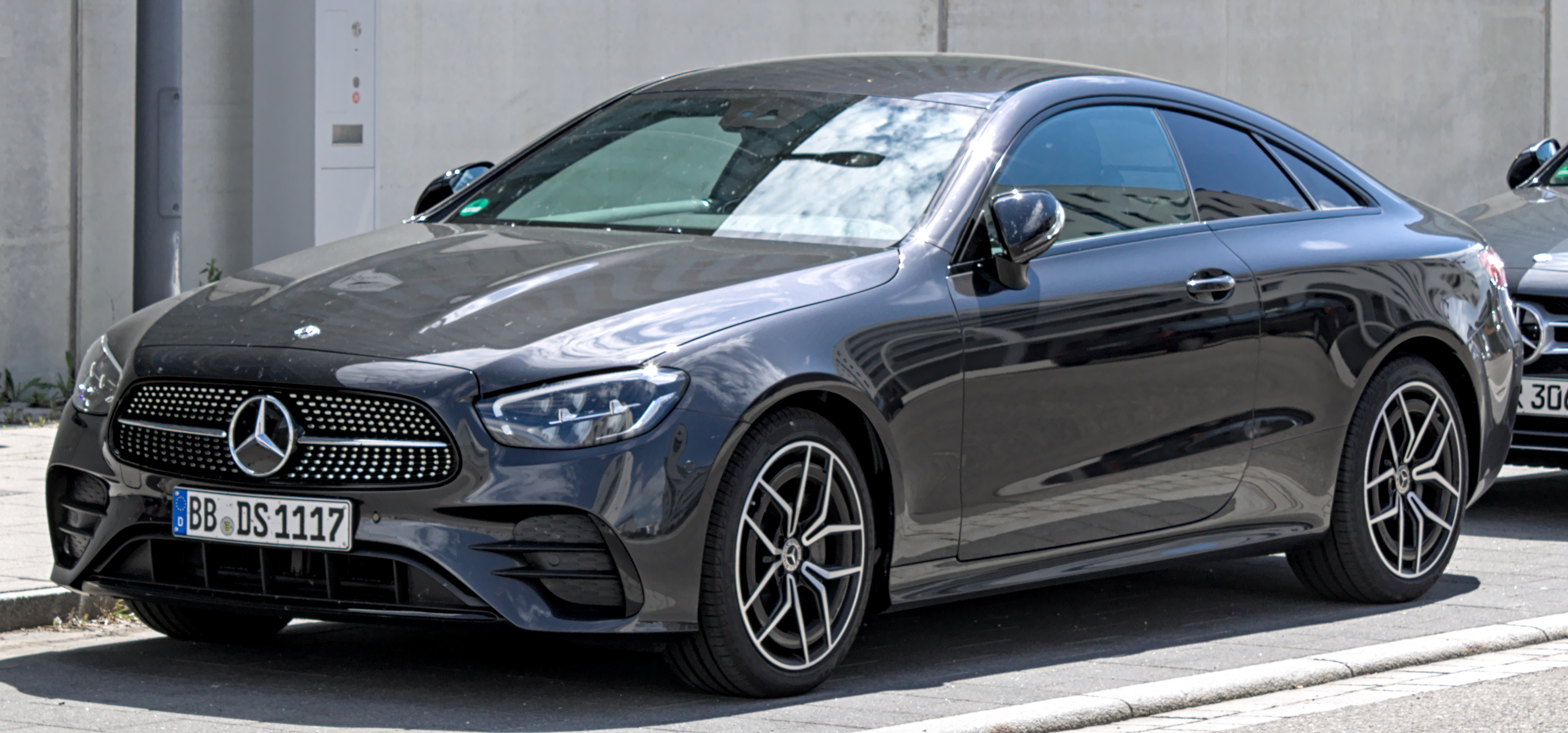
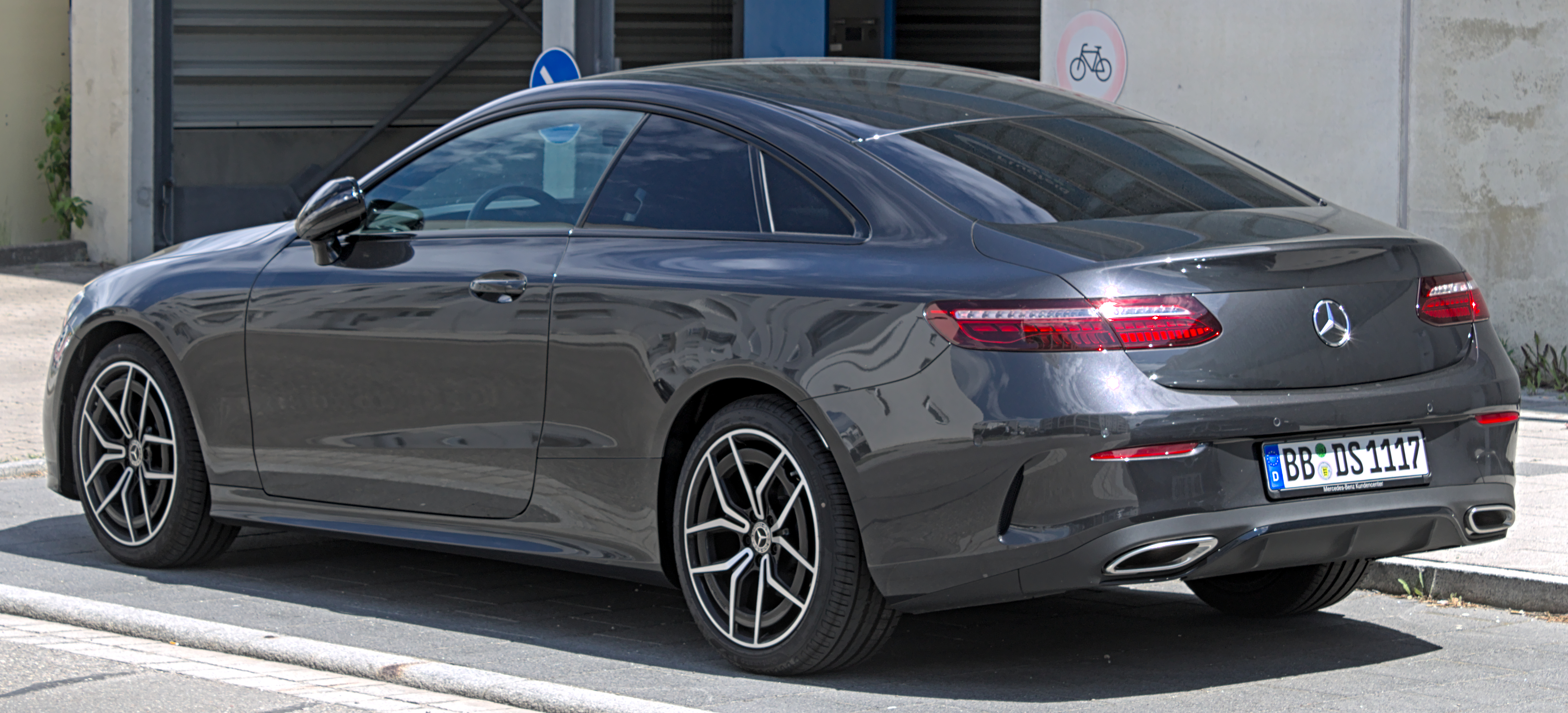
Coupe (facelift)

For the 2021 facelift, the E 450's M276 Biturbo V6 was dropped for the new M256 3.0L inline-6 turbo with EQ Boost. Power outputs are unchanged at 362 PS (357 hp; 266 kW) and 500 N⋅m (369 lb⋅ft). The E 200 and E 300 were similarly updated in 2021, from the M274 turbo inline-four to the M264 2.0L turbo I4 engine with EQ Boost, producing 197 PS (145 kW; 194 hp) and 320 N⋅m (236 lbf⋅ft) in the E 200, and 258 PS (190 kW; 254 hp) and 370 N⋅m (273 lbf⋅ft) in the E 300.

The only AMG variant of the C238/A238 E-Class Coupé and Cabriolet is the E 53 AMG 4MATIC+ produced from 2019 onwards, powered by the M256 3.0L inline 6 turbo with EQ Boost engine, producing 435 PS (429 hp; 320 kW) and 520 N⋅m (384 lb⋅ft).

=== Estate and All-Terrain ===
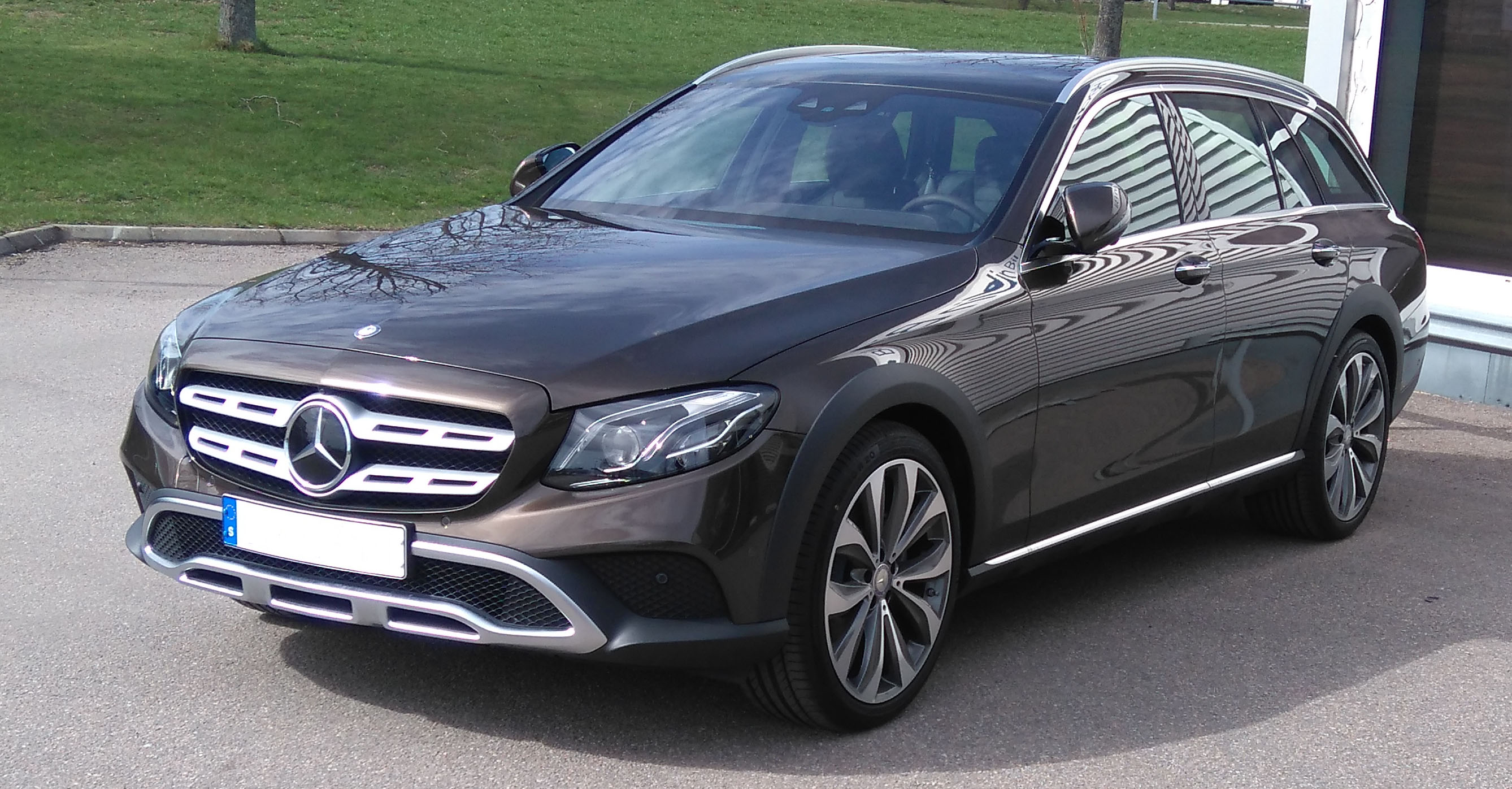
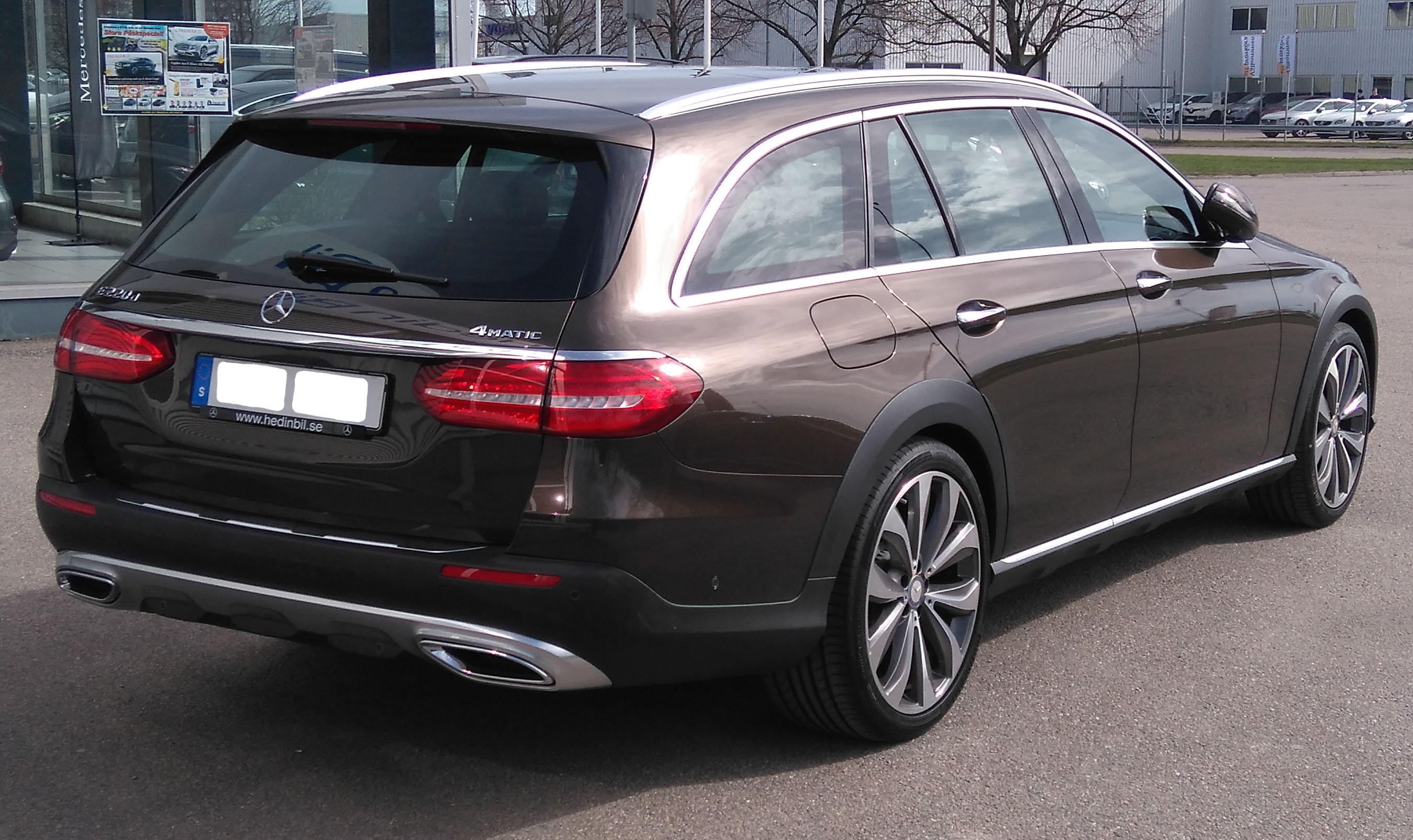
Estate All-Terrain

In a departure from previous generations, the Estate is offered in two distinct variants: a traditional on-road model and an All-Terrain version to directly rival the Audi A6 Allroad and Volvo V90 Cross Country.

Unveiled at the 2016 Paris Motor Show, the Estate All-Terrain features a 29 mm higher ride height due to the Air Body Control air suspension (15 mm) and 20 in wheels fitted as standard (14 mm). There is also external plastic cladding to protect the body from scratches and scrapes, as well as the 4Matic permanent four-wheel-drive system with 31/69 front-rear torque split.

=== E 300 (2016–2023) ===
An E 300, with a 2.0-litre turbo petrol engine, joined the range. This engine was previously available in the facelift W212 E-class in some markets. This engine produces 184 PS (181 hp; 135 kW) in the E 200, 211 PS (208 hp; 155 kW) in the E 250 and 245 PS (242 hp; 180 kW) in the E 300. Like the W212 facelift, the W213 E 300 produces 245 PS (242 hp; 180 kW) and 370 N⋅m (273 lb⋅ft) and accelerates from 0–100 km/h (0–62 mph) in 6.2 seconds.

=== E 350 (2019–2023) ===
The E 350, with an updated 2.0-litre turbo petrol engine, joined the E-Class range for the 2020 model year. This engine is also used in the facelift W205 C-Class and X253/C253 GLC-Class, as well as the W167 GLE-Class. In the E 350, it produces 299 PS (295 hp; 220 kW) at 5,800 - 6,100 rpm and 400 N⋅m (295 lb⋅ft) at 3,000 - 4,000 rpm. Selected markets such as Malaysia and Australia have the EQ Boost feature available on this engine, which produces an additional 14 PS (14 hp; 10 kW). It has a 0–100 km/h (0–62 mph) acceleration time of 5.9 seconds.

=== E 400 (2016–2019) ===
An E 400 with a 3.0-litre twin-turbo M276 V6 petrol engine. It is carried over from the W212 facelift E class and it produces 333 PS (328 hp; 245 kW) and 480 N⋅m (354 lb⋅ft) of torque. It accelerates from 0–100 km/h (62 mph) in 4.9 seconds, a full second faster than the E 350.

The E400 was released with different packages, Standard, Avantgarde, Exclusive, AMG-Line & Night / Black Sport.

The Avantgarde, AMG-Line & Night featured an updated grille with the Mercedes Star.

The Exclusive incorporated a woodgrain dash inside.

Depending on the market, not all models were available. The Japanese market only sold the Exclusive in the E400.

=== E 400 Wagon (2016–2019) ===
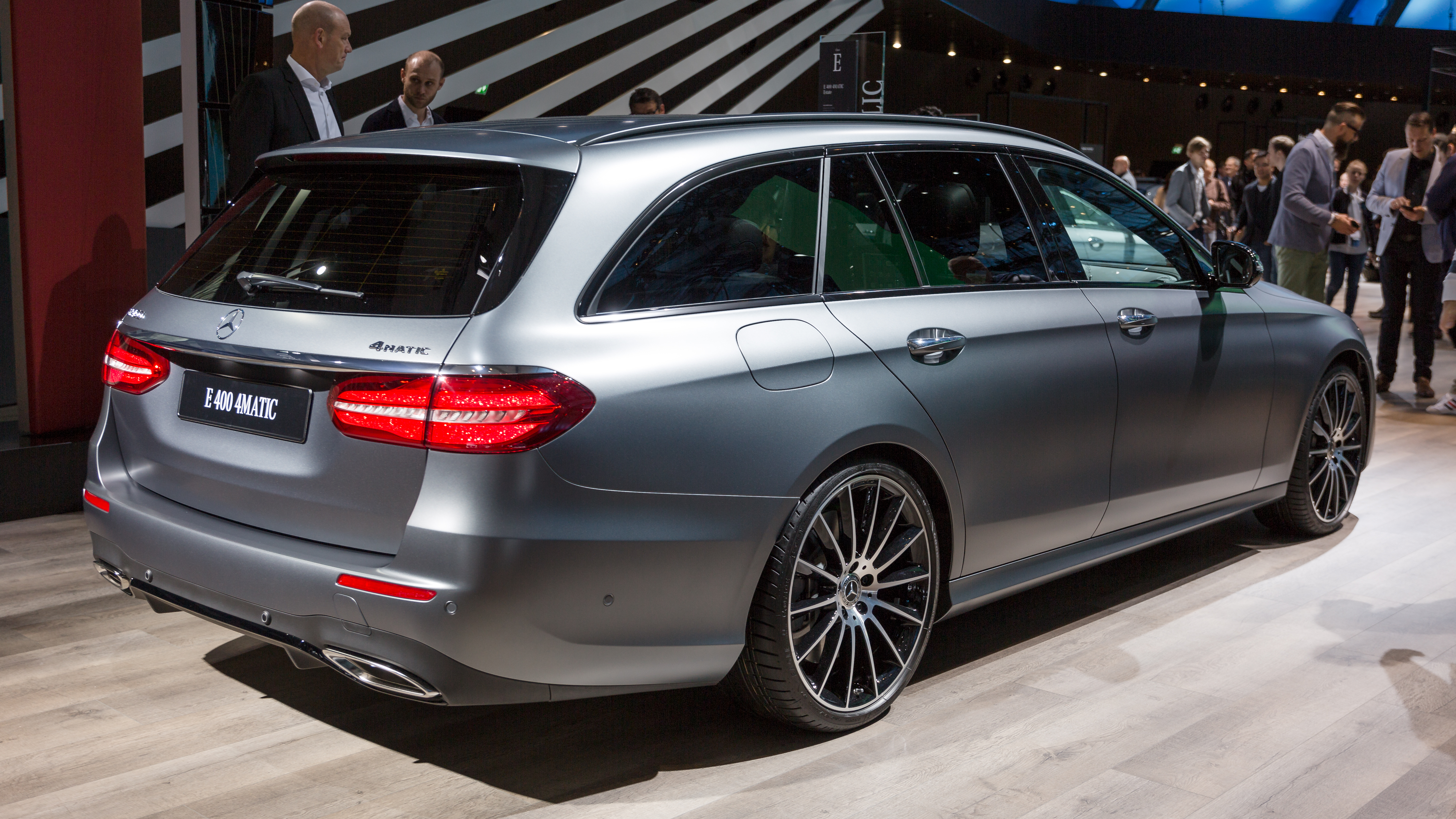
E 400 Wagon

The E 400 wagon features the same 3.0-litre M276 biturbo V6 petrol engine as the sedan version. This car shares many similarities with the sedan but shows differences in its styling and engine. Unlike the E 400 sedan's single turbo engine, the E 400 wagon is equipped with a twin turbo V6 producing 333 PS (245 kW; 328 hp) and 354 lb⋅ft (480 N⋅m) of torque. The main difference seen in this particular model is the fact that it has an increased cargo area. The E 400 wagon has a maximum space of 64.3 cubic feet of load space compared to with 57.4 in the sedan version. The E 400 wagon can also be equipped through options with third row seating allowing more passengers to ride in the car. It can accelerate from 0–60 mph (0–97 km/h) in 5.1 seconds and do the quarter mile in 13.7 seconds at 102 mph (164 km/h) due to its 4Matic all wheel drive system.

=== E 450 (2019–2023) ===
For the 2019 model year, the E 400 was renamed to E 450. It features the same M276 3.0L Biturbo V6 engine with slightly higher outputs, producing 362 PS (266 kW; 357 hp) and 500 N⋅m (369 lb⋅ft). For the 2020 facelift, the M276 Biturbo V6 was dropped for the new M256 3.0L Inline 6 turbo with EQ Boost. Power outputs are unchanged at 362 PS (266 kW; 357 hp) and 500 N⋅m (369 lb⋅ft).

=== E 350e Plug-in Hybrid (2016–2023) ===
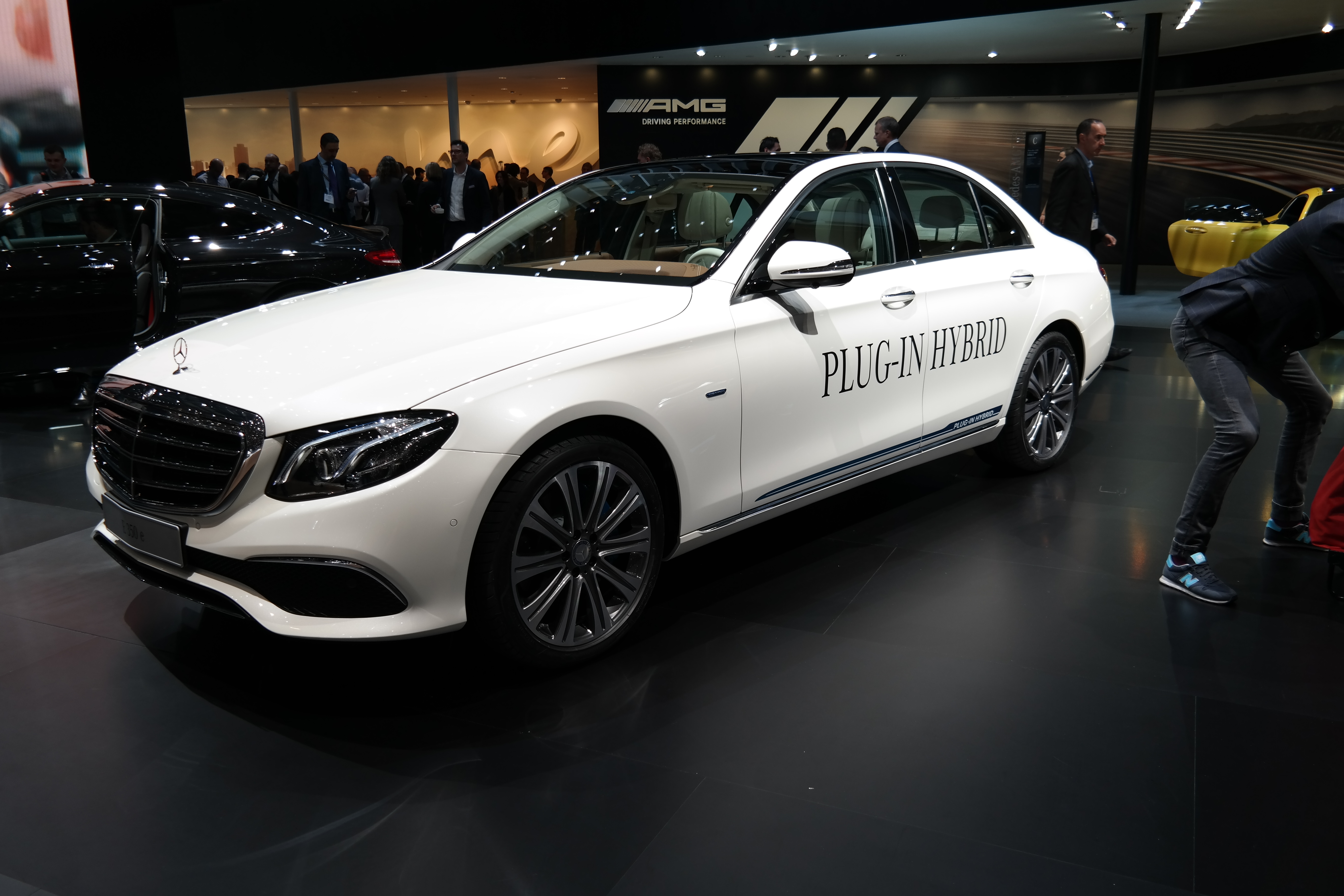
E 350e Plug-in Hybrid

The E 350e is a plug-in hybrid, equipped with a 208 hp (211 PS; 155 kW) turbocharged inline-four coupled with an 87 hp (65 kW; 88 PS) electric motor. The E 350e's transmission is a nine-speed automatic gearbox. Mercedes claims that the car has a 21 mi (34 km) electric only range. The hybrid plug to charge the car is connected on the rear bumper through a small door similar to how the gas door is set up. The E 350e can accelerate from 0–60 mph (0–97 km/h) in 6.2 seconds. Mercedes claims the E 350e weighs about 4,250 lb (1,930 kg), compared to the E 300's weight of 3,650 lb (1,660 kg). The way to distinguish an E 350e from a non-hybrid E 300 is the badging. An E 350e badge is placed on the rear trunk as well as a blue "Plug-in Hybrid" on the side of the car. Mercedes offers an option to paint the brake calipers the same blue as the "Plug-in Hybrid" as well.

=== Long wheelbase (V213; China and India) ===
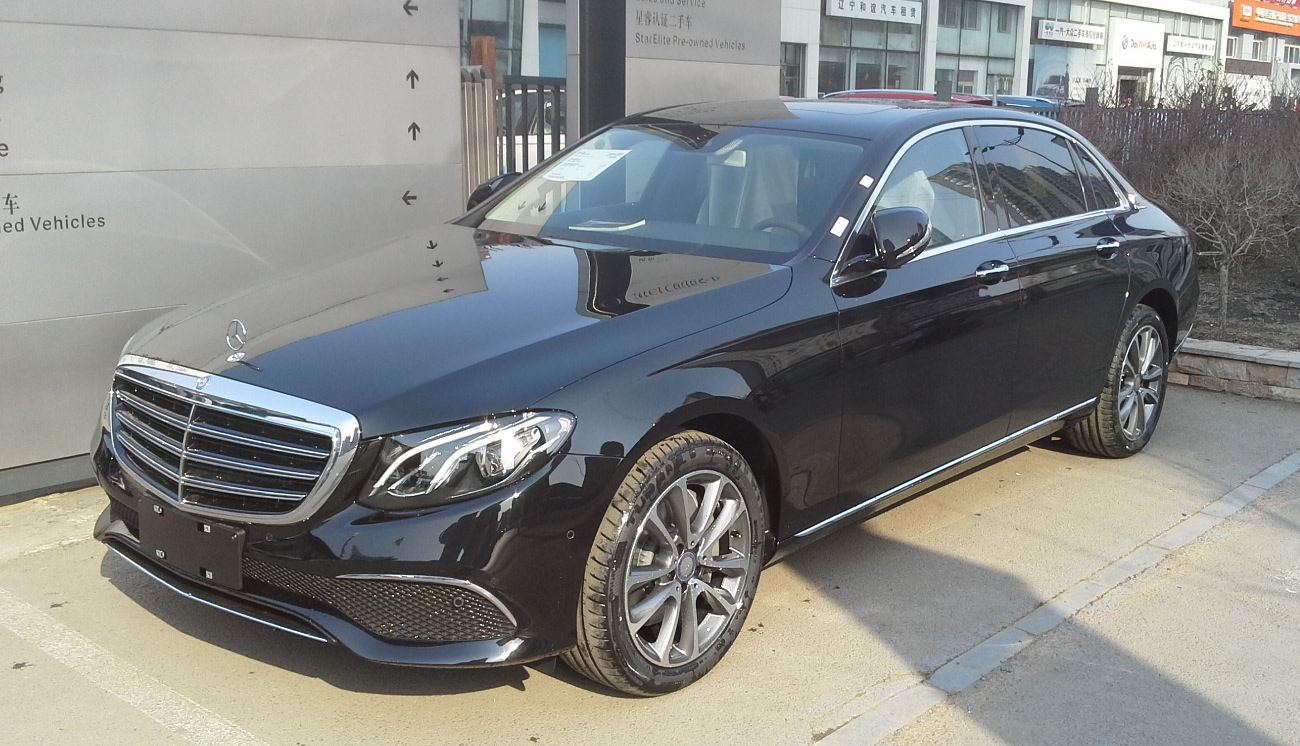
The Chinese market E-Class LWB

The V213 is the latest generation long wheelbase E-Class saloon. This Long-Wheelbase version so far is only available in the Chinese and Indian markets. The E-Class V213 was launched at the 2016 Beijing Auto Show and went on sale in China in August the same year. The V213 E-Class is often referred to as the ‘smaller S-Class’, mainly due to the many similarities they have including the shape of the c-pillar and so on.

The car is 5,065 mm long, which makes it the longest E-Class ever made. The V213 E-Class is sold in three basic models, E200L, E300L and E320L, all of which can be selected between Exclusive line and AMG Line designs. The new 4-cylinder turbocharged M274 or M276 petrol engines are available, which are quick enough to accelerate the E200L from 0-62 mph (100 km/h) in 8.6 seconds, the E300L in 6.9 seconds and the E320L 4MATIC in a claimed 5.7 seconds. The new 9G-Tronic transmission, which focuses more on efficiency and smoother gear changes, is standard across the whole range.

On 29 September 2020, Mercedes also unveiled the facelifted version of V213 LWB E-Class at the Auto China 2020. Like before, this is only sold in China and India.

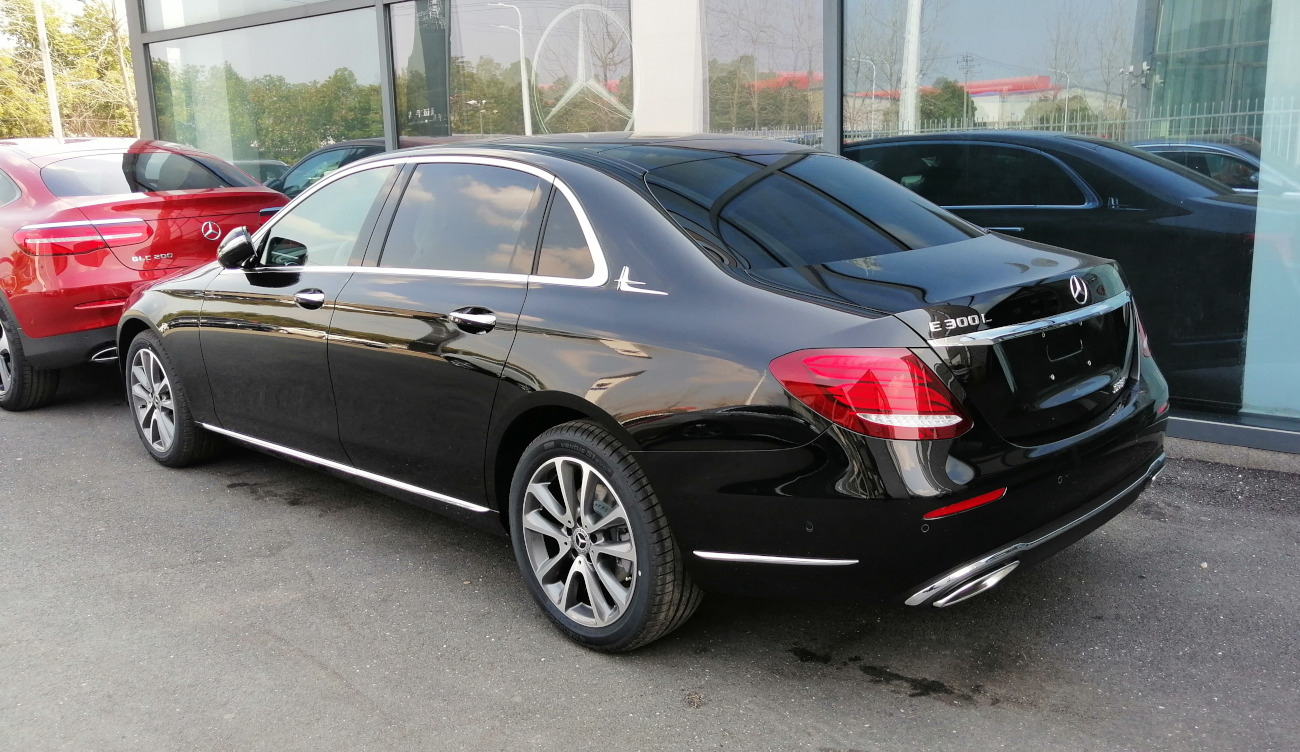
Rear view

Since its launch, there have been some disappointment as well as admiration in China. The longer wheelbase and luxury equipment have made the new E-Class popularly recognized as the less expensive alternative to the S-Class. Another reason being that the design has taken inspiration from the Maybach S-Class. While some buyers are dissatisfied with the fact that some of the equipment like the multibeam headlights and several driving assistances, which are brand new features on this model, do not come as standard and are listed as "optional extras" (to pay for), others comment that the spacious cabin, new interior (all V213 E-Class have 12.3 inch displays) and luxurious features such as onboard Wi-Fi and Wireless Charging, and automatic emergency brakes as standard, which are items not available on the worldwide W213 E-Class contribute to the Long-Wheelbase's market success. The price difference between W213 and V213 E-Class in China is not significantly large, around only 10,000 RMB ($1,560), which makes the V213 E-Class even more attractive to buy.

== Drivetrain (2016–2020) ==
Engine options for the 2017 E-Class saw a major update, thanks to the switch to inline-6 engines from the previous V6 engines, along with a new generation of four-cylinder diesel engines (OM654) and existing four-cylinder petrol engines (M274). All engines, save for the AMG V8, come standard with Mercedes’ 9G-TRONIC nine-speed automatic gearbox; the AMG V8 uses a nine-speed AMG SPEEDSHIFT gearbox.

Until April 2018, the E 200 was available with a six-speed manual transmission in Europe, but it was discontinued and 9G-Tronic became standard. Alongside standard rear-wheel drive, select engines are offered with optional four-wheel drive. In 2017, Mercedes-Benz launched the E 180 model utilizing the M274 DE16 LA engine in select markets, such as Egypt, Tunisia, Turkey, the Philippines and Singapore.

=== Engines (2016–2020) ===
Petrol engines
Models	Production years	Engines	Power	Torque
E 180*	2017–2020	1,595 cc (97.3 cu in) turbocharged 16V I4 (M274 DE16 LA) 1,497 cc (91.4 cu in) turbocharged 16V I4 (M264 E15 DEH LA)	156 PS (115 kW; 154 hp) at 5,300 rpm 158 PS (116 kW; 156 hp) at 5,800- 6,100 rpm	250 N⋅m (184 lbf⋅ft) at 1,200-4,000 rpm 250 N⋅m (184 lbf⋅ft) at 1,500-4,000 rpm
E 200	2016–2019	1,991 cc (121.5 cu in) turbocharged 16V I4 (M274 DE20 LA)	184 PS (135 kW; 181 hp) at 5,500 rpm	300 N⋅m (221 lbf⋅ft) at 1,200-4,000 rpm
E 200 4MATIC	2016–2019	1,991 cc (121.5 cu in) turbocharged 16V I4 (M274 DE20 LA)	184 PS (135 kW; 181 hp) at 5,500 rpm	300 N⋅m (221 lbf⋅ft) at 1,200-4,000 rpm
E 200	2019–2020	1,991 cc (121.5 cu in) turbocharged 16V I4 (M264 E20 DEH LA) + 48V Electric Motor (MHEV)	197 PS (145 kW; 194 hp) + 14 PS (10 kW; 14 hp) at 5,500-6,100 rpm	320 N⋅m (236 lbf⋅ft) at 1,650-4,000 rpm
E 200 4MATIC	2019–2020	1,991 cc (121.5 cu in) turbocharged 16V I4 (M264 E20 DEH LA) + 48V Electric Motor (MHEV)	197 PS (145 kW; 194 hp) + 14 PS (10 kW; 14 hp) at 5,500-6,100 rpm	320 N⋅m (236 lbf⋅ft) at 1,650-4,000 rpm
E 250	2016–2018	1,991 cc (121.5 cu in) turbocharged 16V I4 (M274 DE20 LA)	211 PS (155 kW; 208 hp) at 5,500 rpm	350 N⋅m (258 lbf⋅ft) at 1,200-4,000 rpm
E 300	2016–2019	1,991 cc (121.5 cu in) turbocharged 16V I4 (M274 DE20 LA)	245 PS (180 kW; 242 hp) at 5,500 rpm	370 N⋅m (273 lbf⋅ft) at 1,300-4,000 rpm
E 300	2019–2020	1,991 cc (121.5 cu in) turbocharged 16V I4 (M264 E20 DEH LA) + 48V Electric Motor (MHEV)	258 PS (190 kW; 254 hp) + 14 PS (10 kW; 14 hp) at 5,500-6,100 rpm	370 N⋅m (273 lbf⋅ft) at 1,800-4,000 rpm
E 350	2018–2020	1,991 cc (121.5 cu in) turbocharged 16V I4 (M264 E20 DEH LA) + 48V Electric Motor (MHEV)	299 PS (220 kW; 295 hp) + 14 PS (10 kW; 14 hp) at 5,800-6,100 rpm	400 N⋅m (295 lbf⋅ft) at 3,000-4,000 rpm
E 400 4MATIC	2016–2018	2,996 cc (182.8 cu in) twin-turbo 24V V6 (M276 DE30 LA) 3,498 cc (213.5 cu in) twin-turbo 24V V6 (M276 DE35 LA)	333 PS (245 kW; 328 hp) at 5,250-6,000 rpm	480 N⋅m (354 lbf⋅ft) at 1,200-4,000 rpm
E 450 4MATIC	2018–2020	2,996 cc (182.8 cu in) twin-turbo 24V V6 (M276 DE30 LA)	367 PS (270 kW; 362 hp) at 5,500-6,000 rpm	500 N⋅m (369 lbf⋅ft) at 1,800-4,500 rpm
AMG E 43 4MATIC	2016–2018	2,996 cc (182.8 cu in) twin-turbo 24V V6 (M276 DE30 LA)	401 PS (295 kW; 396 hp) at 6,100 rpm	520 N⋅m (384 lbf⋅ft) at 2,500-5,000 rpm
AMG E 53 4MATIC+	2018–2020	2,999 cc (183.0 cu in) turbocharged 24V I6 (M256 E30 DEH LA G) + 48V Electric Motor (MHEV)	435 PS (320 kW; 429 hp) + 22 PS (16 kW; 22 hp) at 6,100 rpm	520 N⋅m (384 lbf⋅ft) at 1,800-5,800 rpm
AMG E 63 4MATIC+	2017–2020	3,982 cc (243.0 cu in) twin-turbo 32V V8 (M177 DE40 LA)	571 PS (420 kW; 563 hp) at 5,750-6,500 rpm	750 N⋅m (553 lbf⋅ft) at 2,500-5,000 rpm
AMG E 63 S 4MATIC+	2017–2020	3,982 cc (243.0 cu in) twin-turbo 32V V8 (M177 DE40 LA)	612 PS (450 kW; 604 hp) at 5,750-6,500 rpm	850 N⋅m (627 lbf⋅ft) at 2,500-4,500 rpm

Diesel engines
Models	Production years	Engines	Power	Torque
E 200d	2016–2019	1,950 cc (119 cu in) turbocharged 16V I4 (OM654 DE20 SCR)	150 PS (110 kW; 148 hp) at 3,200-4,800 rpm	360 N⋅m (266 lbf⋅ft) at 1,400-2,800 rpm
E 200d	2019–2020	1,597 cc (97.5 cu in) turbocharged 16V I4 (OM654 DE16 G SCR)	160 PS (118 kW; 158 hp) at 3,800 rpm	360 N⋅m (266 lbf⋅ft) at 1,600-2,600 rpm
E 220d	2016–2020	1,950 cc (119 cu in) turbocharged 16V I4 (OM654 DE20 SCR)	194 PS (143 kW; 191 hp) at 3,800 rpm	400 N⋅m (295 lbf⋅ft) at 1,600-2,800 rpm
E 220d 4MATIC	2016–2020	1,950 cc (119 cu in) turbocharged 16V I4 (OM654 DE20 SCR)	194 PS (143 kW; 191 hp) at 3,800 rpm	400 N⋅m (295 lbf⋅ft) at 1,600-2,800 rpm
E 300d	2018–2020	1,950 cc (119 cu in) turbocharged 16V I4 (OM654 DE20 SCR)	245 PS (180 kW; 242 hp) at 4,200 rpm	500 N⋅m (369 lbf⋅ft) at 1,600-2,400 rpm
E 350d	2016–2018	2,987 cc (182.3 cu in) turbocharged 24V V6 (OM642 LS DE30 LA)	258 PS (190 kW; 254 hp) at 3,400 rpm	620 N⋅m (457 lbf⋅ft) at 1,600-2,400 rpm
E 350d 4MATIC	2016–2018	2,987 cc (182.3 cu in) turbocharged 24V V6 (OM642 LS DE30 LA)	258 PS (190 kW; 254 hp) at 3,400 rpm	620 N⋅m (457 lbf⋅ft) at 1,600-2,400 rpm
E 350d	2018–2020	2,925 cc (178.5 cu in) turbocharged 24V I6 (OM656 DE29T LA)	286 PS (210 kW; 282 hp) at 3,600-4,600 rpm	600 N⋅m (443 lbf⋅ft) at 1,200-3,200 rpm
E 400d 4MATIC	2018–2020	2,925 cc (178.5 cu in) twin-turbo 24V I6 (OM656 DE29TT LA)	340 PS (250 kW; 335 hp) at 3,600-4,400 rpm	700 N⋅m (516 lbf⋅ft) at 1,200-3,200 rpm

Hybrid engines
Models	Production years	Engines	Power	Torque
E 350e	2016–2018	1,991 cc (121.5 cu in) turbocharged 16V I4 (M274 DE20 LA) + Electric Motor (PHEV)	211 PS (155 kW; 208 hp) + 88 PS (65 kW; 87 hp) at 5,500 rpm	350 N⋅m (258 lbf⋅ft) + 340 N⋅m (251 lbf⋅ft) at 1,200-4,000 rpm
E 300e	2018–2020	1,991 cc (121.5 cu in) turbocharged 16V I4 (M274 DE20 LA) + Electric Motor (PHEV)	211 PS (155 kW; 208 hp) + 122 PS (90 kW; 120 hp) at 5,500 rpm	350 N⋅m (258 lbf⋅ft) + 440 N⋅m (325 lbf⋅ft) at 1,200-4,000 rpm
E 300de	2018–2020	1,950 cc (119 cu in) turbocharged 16V I4 (OM654 DE20 SCR) + Electric Motor (PHEV)	194 PS (143 kW; 191 hp) + 122 PS (90 kW; 120 hp) at 3,800 rpm	400 N⋅m (295 lbf⋅ft) + 440 N⋅m (325 lbf⋅ft) at 1,600-2,800 rpm

* - Only available in selected markets, including but not limited to - Turkey, Egypt, Philippines, Singapore and Vietnam.

=== Transmissions (2016–2020) ===
Petrol engines
Models	Production years	Standard	Optional
E 180	2017–2020	9G-TRONIC	-
E 200	2016–2020	6-speed manual (2016–2018) 9G-TRONIC (2018–2020)	9G-TRONIC (2016–2018)
E 200 4MATIC	2016–2020	9G-TRONIC	-
E 250	2016–2020	9G-TRONIC	-
E 300	2016–2020	9G-TRONIC	-
E 350	2018–2020	9G-TRONIC	-
E 400 4MATIC	2016–2018	9G-TRONIC	-
E 450 4MATIC	2018–2020	9G-TRONIC	-
AMG E 43 4MATIC	2016–2018	9G-TRONIC	-
AMG E 53 4MATIC+	2018–2020	AMG SPEEDSHIFT TCT 9-speed	-
AMG E 63 4MATIC+	2017–2020	AMG SPEEDSHIFT MCT 9-speed	-
AMG E 63 S 4MATIC+	2017–2020	AMG SPEEDSHIFT MCT 9-speed	-

Diesel engines
Models	Production years	Standard	Optional
E 200d	2016–2020	9G-TRONIC	-
E 220d	2016–2020	9G-TRONIC	-
E 220d 4MATIC	2016–2020	9G-TRONIC	-
E 300d	2018–2020	9G-TRONIC	-
E 350d	2016–2020	9G-TRONIC	-
E 350d 4MATIC	2016–2020	9G-TRONIC	-
E 400d 4MATIC	2018–2020	9G-TRONIC	-

Hybrid engines
Models	Production years	Standard	Optional
E 350e	2016–2018	9G-TRONIC	-
E 300e	2018–2020	9G-TRONIC	-
E 300de	2018–2020	9G-TRONIC	-

== Mercedes-AMG models ==
=== AMG E 43 (2016–2018) ===
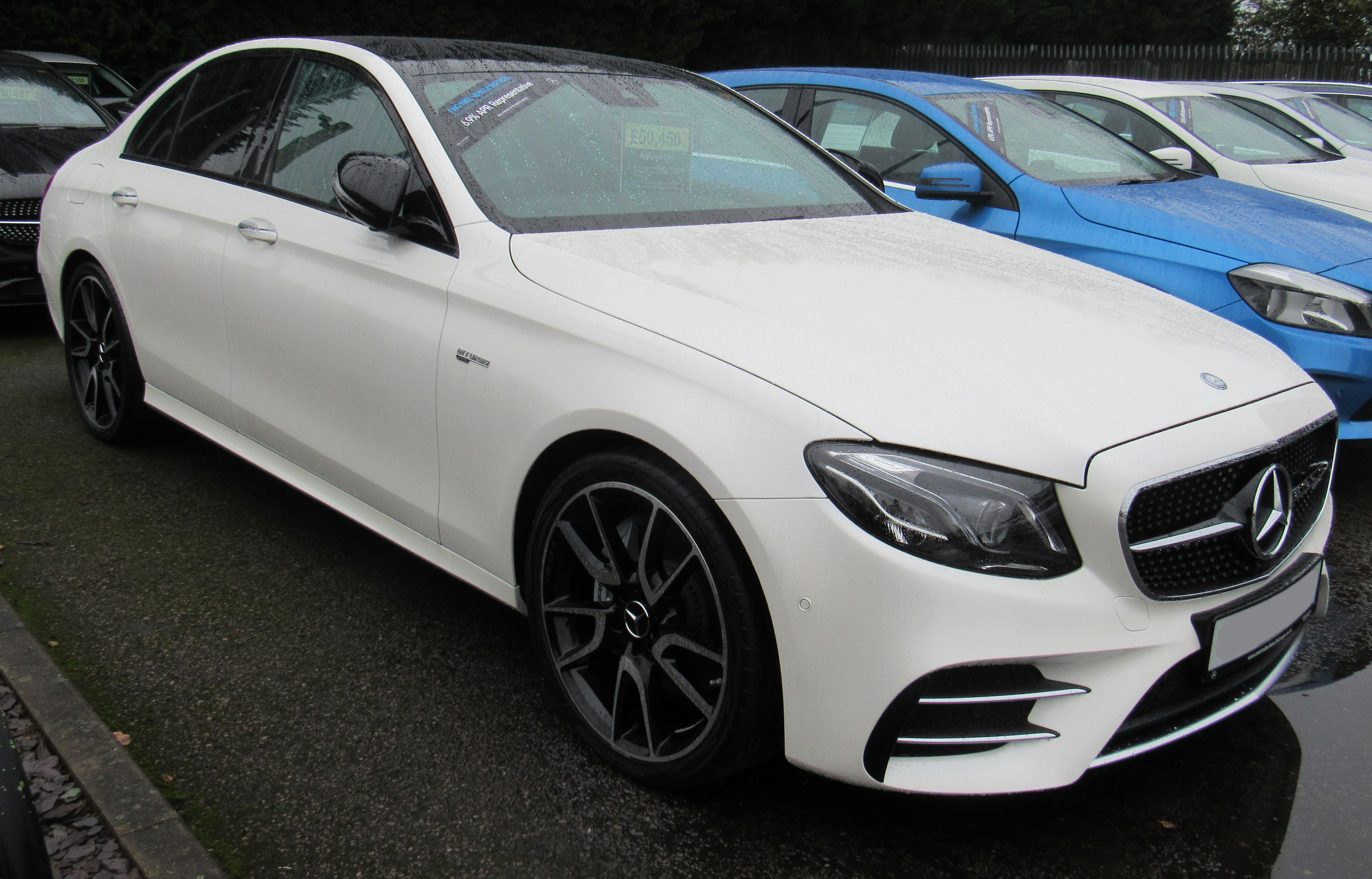
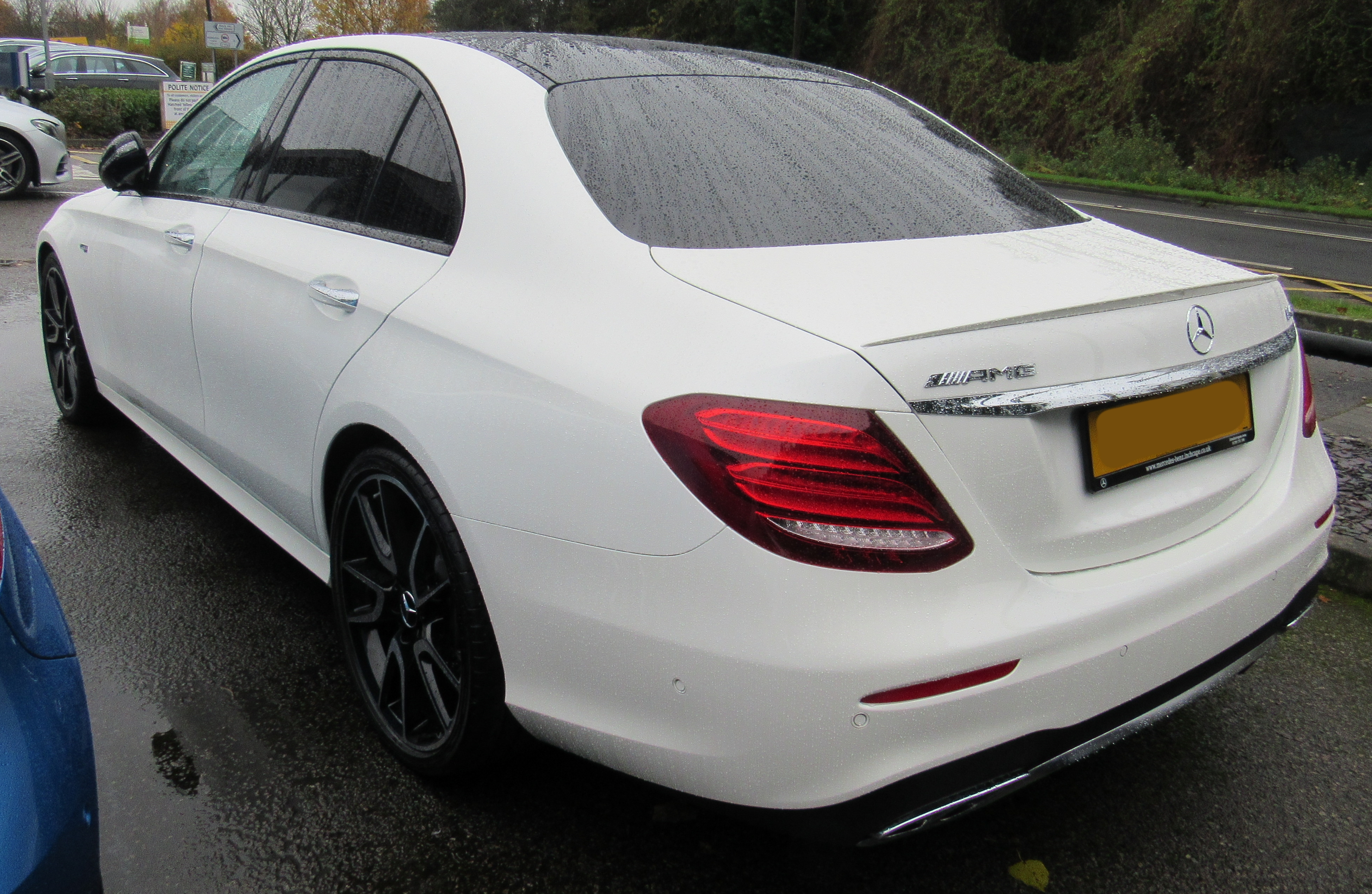
Mercedes-Benz AMG E 43 Premium+

The all-wheel-drive only Mercedes-AMG E 43 joined the range in September 2016, powered by a 401 PS (295 kW; 396 bhp) 3.0-litre Biturbo V6, producing 521 N⋅m (384 lb⋅ft) of torque, mated to a nine-speed automatic transmission. Acceleration from 0 to 100 km/h (62 mph) takes 4.6 seconds. Top speed is electronically limited to 250 km/h (160 mph). The AMG E 43 was the first of the new AMG 43 series with a higher output of 401 PS vs 367 PS of the existing AMG 43 series. The E 43 was dropped for the 2018 model year, replaced by the E 53. Since the discontinuation of the E 43 in 2018, an E 400 (later renamed to E 450) was launched to fill the gap between the 4-cylinder E300 and the 6 cylinder, high-performance AMG E 53.

=== AMG E 53 4MATIC+ (2018–2023) ===
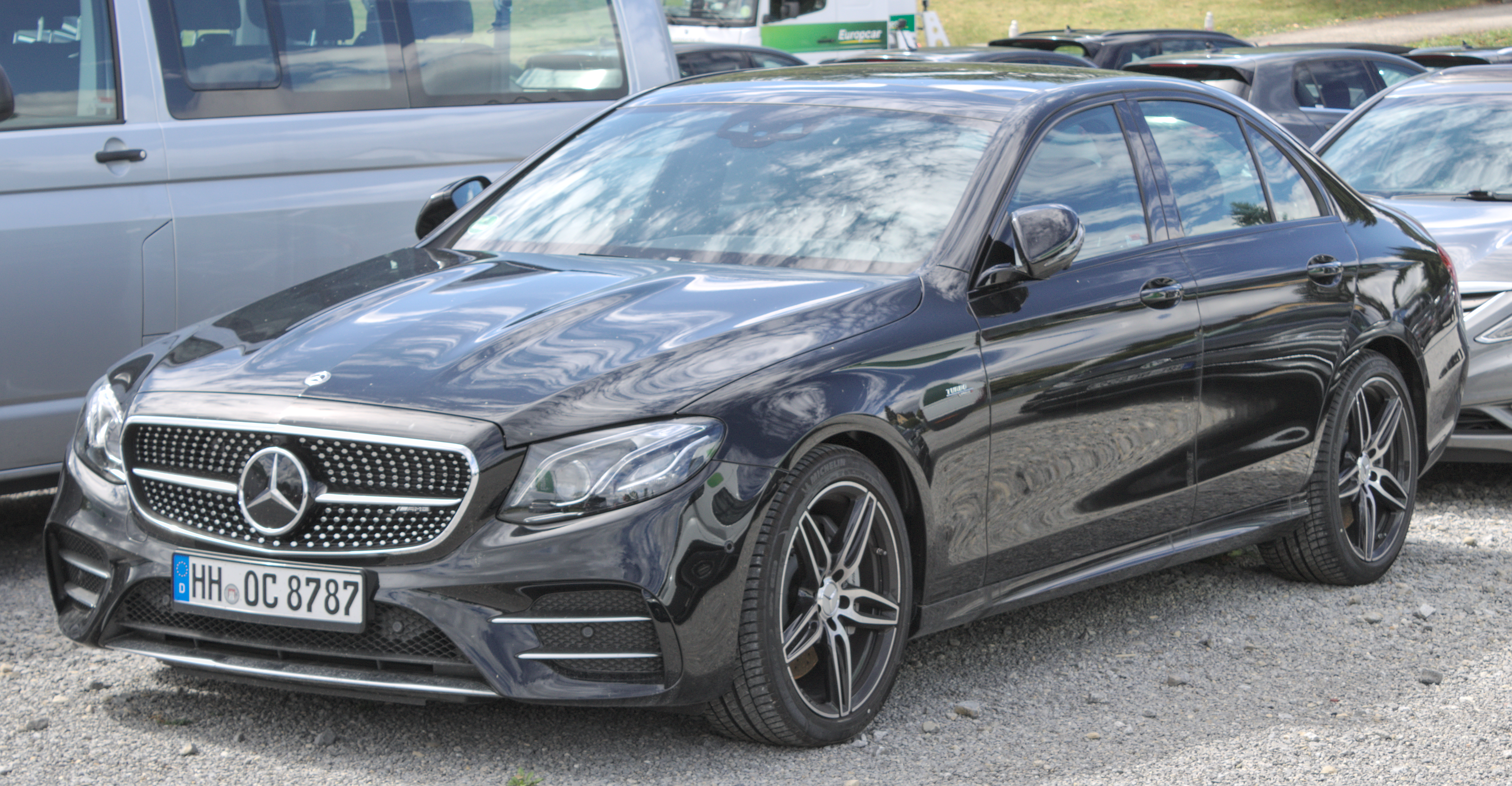
E 53 4MATIC+

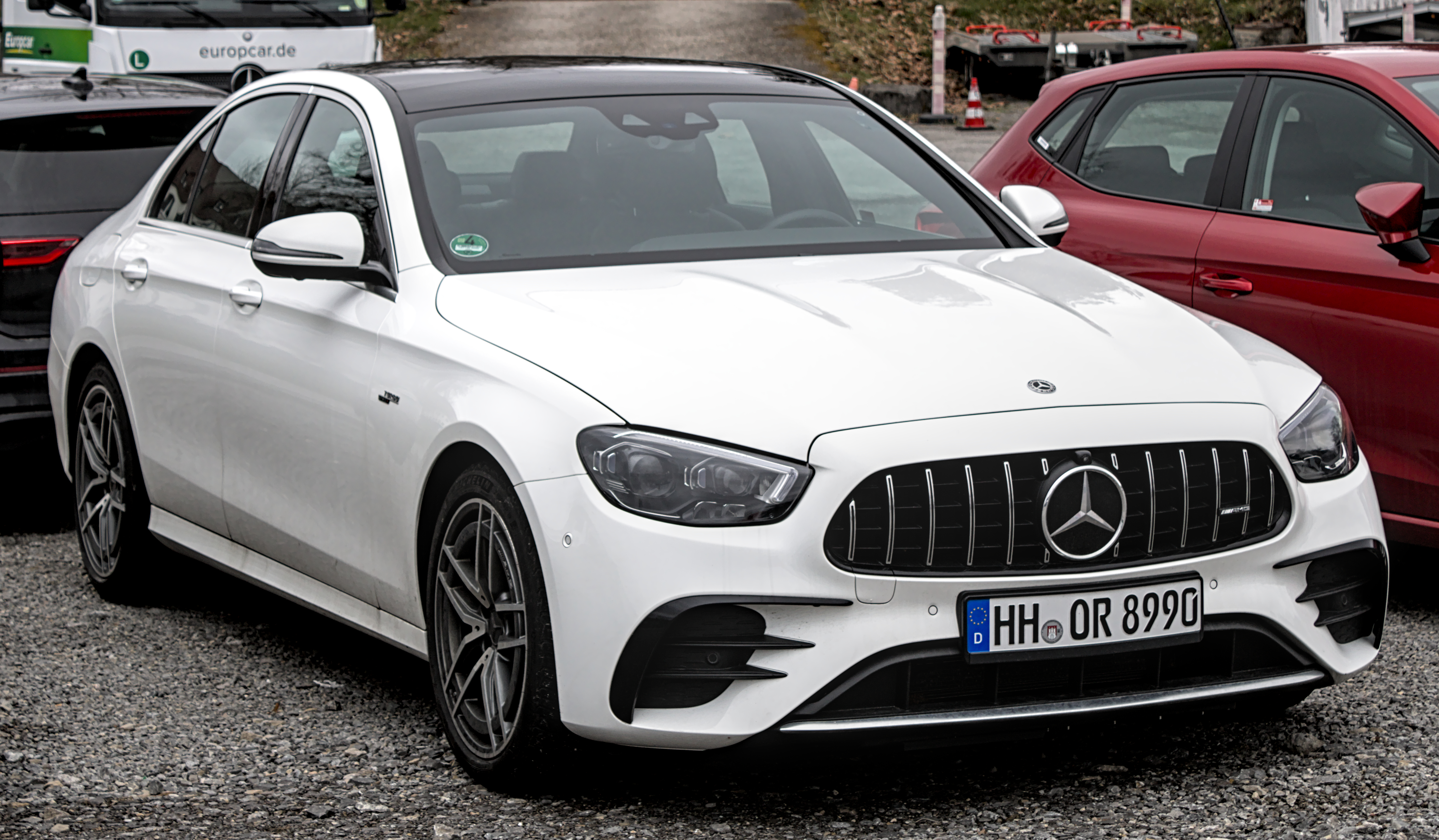
E 53 4MATIC+ Facelift

A mid-level AMG version, E 53 4MATIC+, is fitted with a 3-litre 6-cylinder inline M256 E30 DEH LA G engine, producing 320 kW (435 PS; 429 hp) and 520 N⋅m (384 lb⋅ft). Due to the higher volume of mid-level AMG version, this type of engine is tuned by AMG and built on the assembly lines by people and robots at the manufacturing plants rather than "one man, one engine" approach.

The Mercedes-AMG Coupé and Cabriolet versions were introduced once again in 2019 after skipping the previous generation (C207). AMG E 53 4MATIC+ remains the sole AMG version for both coupé and cabriolet.

=== AMG E 53 4MATIC+ (2026) ===
In July 2026, Mercedes-Benz India launched the AMG E 53 HYBRID 4MATIC+ in Performance and Racing editions, priced from ₹1.45 crore (ex-showroom). Its 3.0-litre inline-six plug-in hybrid produces 585 hp (up to 612 hp with RACE START) and accelerates from 0–100 km/h in 3.8 to 4.0 seconds, offering over 100 km of electric-only range.

=== AMG E 63 4MATIC+ and AMG E 63 S 4MATIC+ (2016–2023) ===
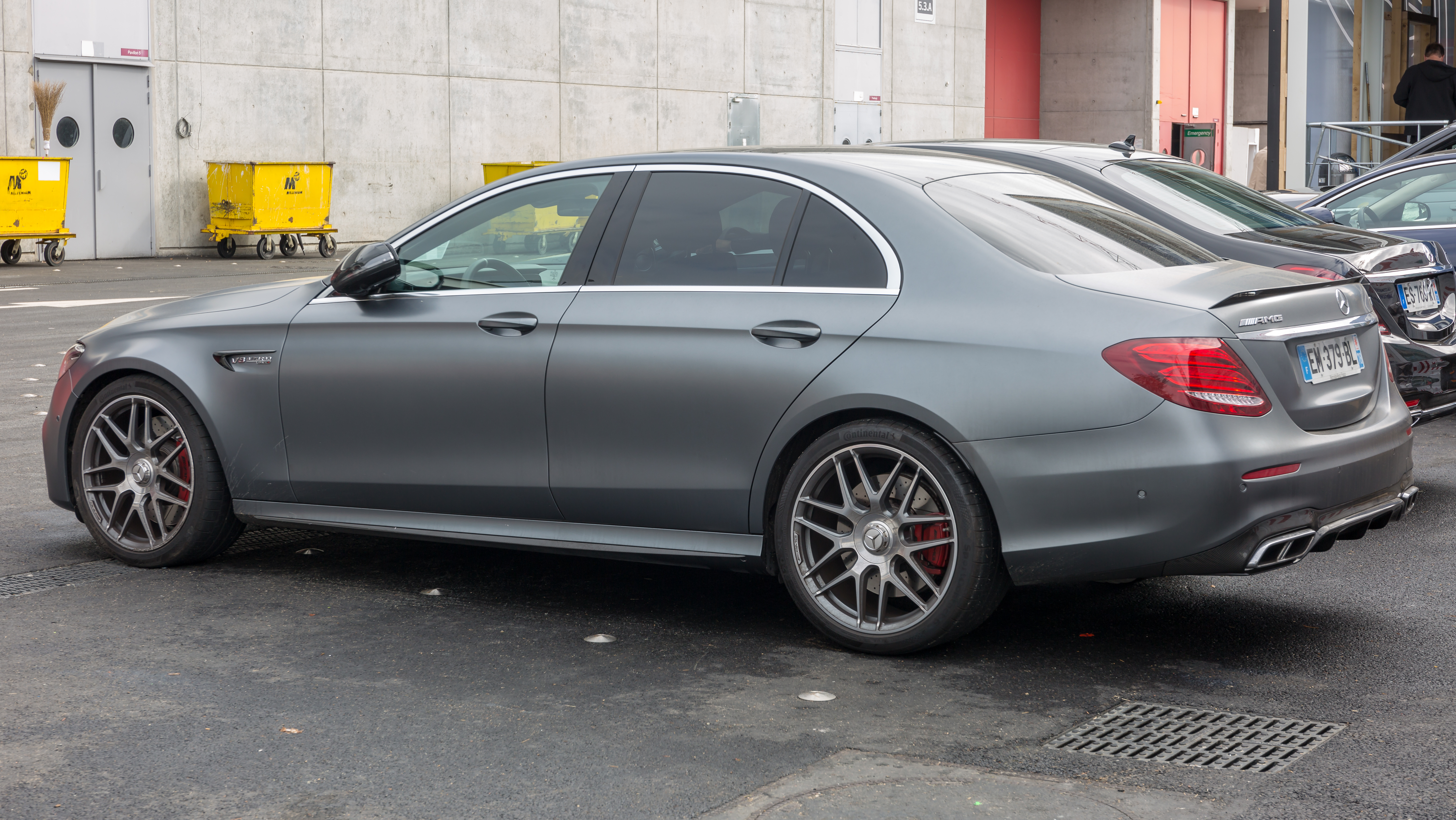
E 63 4MATIC+

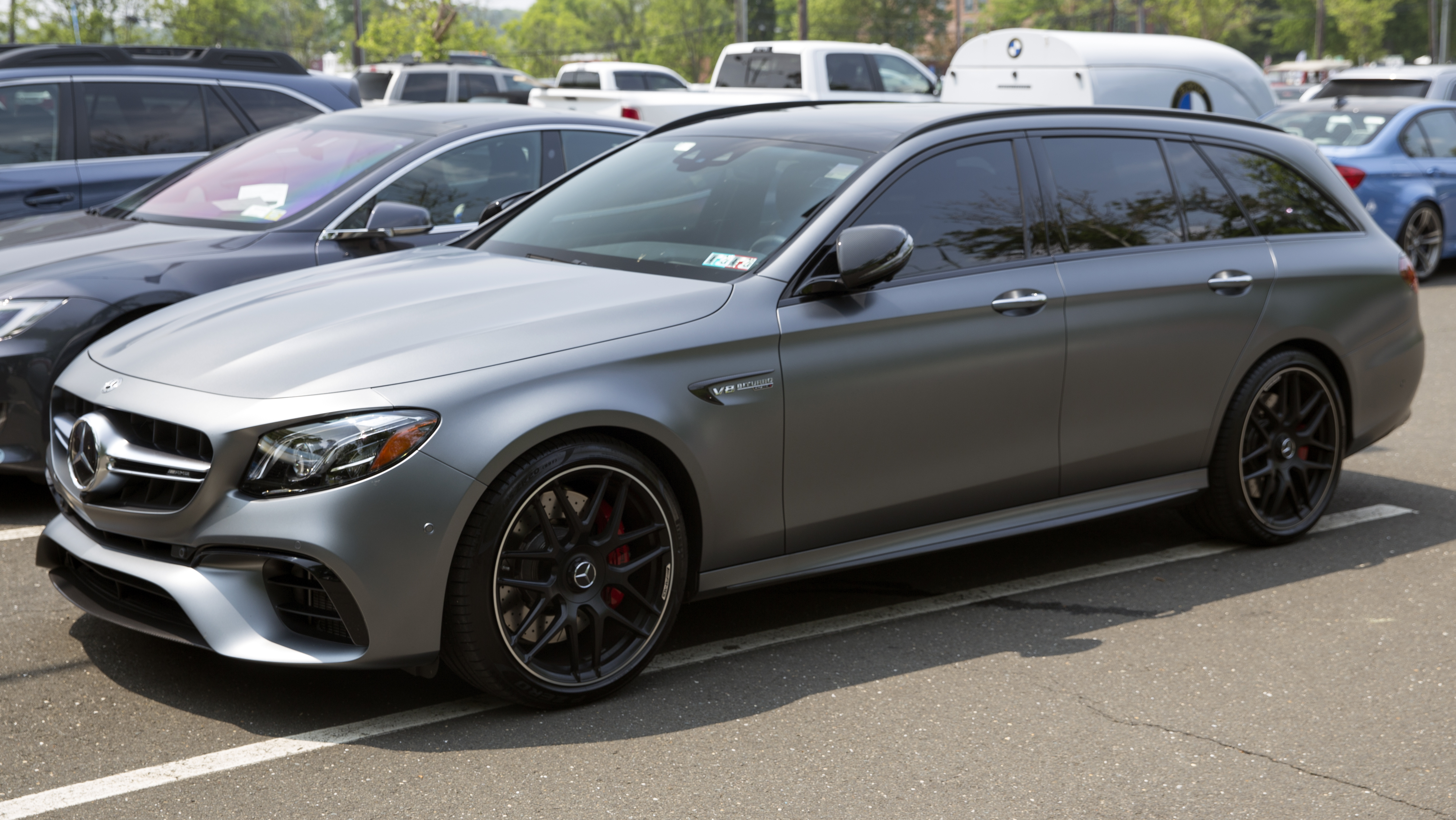
E 63 S 4MATIC+ Wagon

Presented in November 2016, the new Mercedes-AMG E 63 4MATIC+ and AMG E 63 S 4MATIC+ received AMG M177 twin-turbo 4.0-litre V8 in two states of tune and with fully variable all-wheel-drive. The standard AMG E 63 4MATIC+ has 571 PS (420 kW; 563 hp) and accelerates from 0 to 100 km/h (62 mph) in 3.5 seconds. The AMG E 63 S 4MATIC+ has same engine but with higher output rate at 612 PS (450 kW; 604 hp) and accelerates from 0 to 100 km/h (62 mph) in 3.4 seconds. Both versions are electronically limited to 250 km/h (155 mph), however this can be increased to 300 km/h (186 mph) with the AMG Driver's Package. While most other high-performance AMG variants such as the E53 have had electrification added in recent years, the E63 stands out as one which didn't receive such a performance-enhancing 48V mild-hybrid system. Director of Vehicle Development at Mercedes-AMG, Drummond Jacoy, gave two main reasons, physical space and market positioning. "We want a Race Start [launch control feature], we want quick shifting," Jacoy said. "To do that we've used our electromechanical clutch and not a torque converter," the latter of which works with the integrated starter-generator (ISG) setup found in the EQ-Boost mild-hybrid tech. "To be completely honest with you, we have package restraints, so we couldn't fit the ISG in there." Secondly, "We have a car lineup," Jacoy noted, "and above the E63 we have the GT63 S, so we don't want to have an overlap there. We kept more power exclusive to the GT63 S."

The E 63 4MATIC+ models are both also available with the wagon body. The AMG E 63 wagon's styling cues and features are much different from the base model to distinguish that it is a performance variant of the car. The front bumper is wider, a front splitter is added, and large opening flanks are seen on the AMG-branded grille. The car also has various AMG branding throughout it to show its significance and the badging on the rear trunk lid depicts that it is in fact an AMG E 63 (S) wagon. The AMG E 63 wagon is equipped with 64 cubic feet of cargo volume compared to the AMG E 63 sedan's 57.4 cubic feet. The vehicle is also used as the official F1 medical car. As with the sedan, the wagon also does not receive the mild-hybrid technology found in other cars in the AMG lineup.

== W213 facelift ==
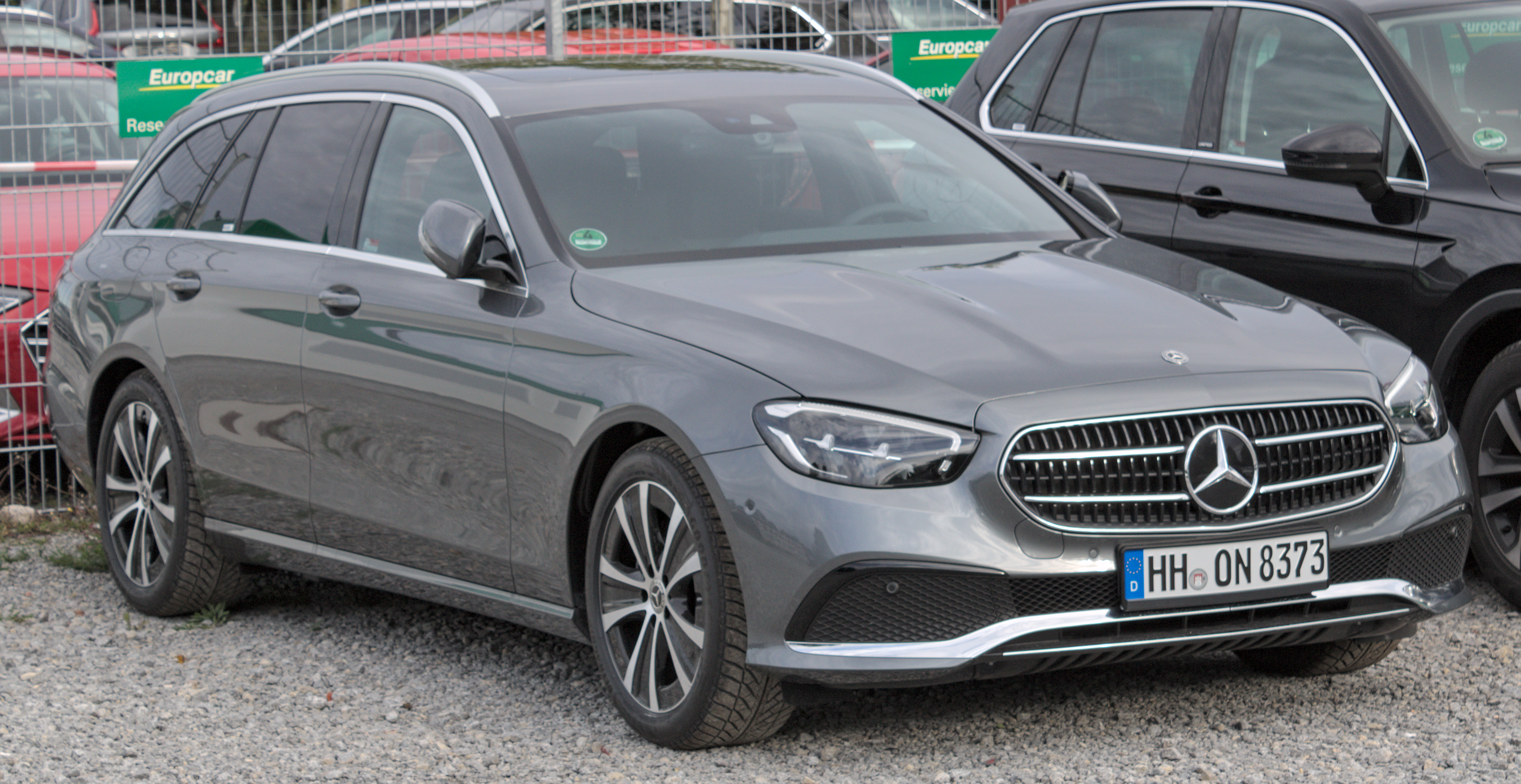
Wagon (facelift)

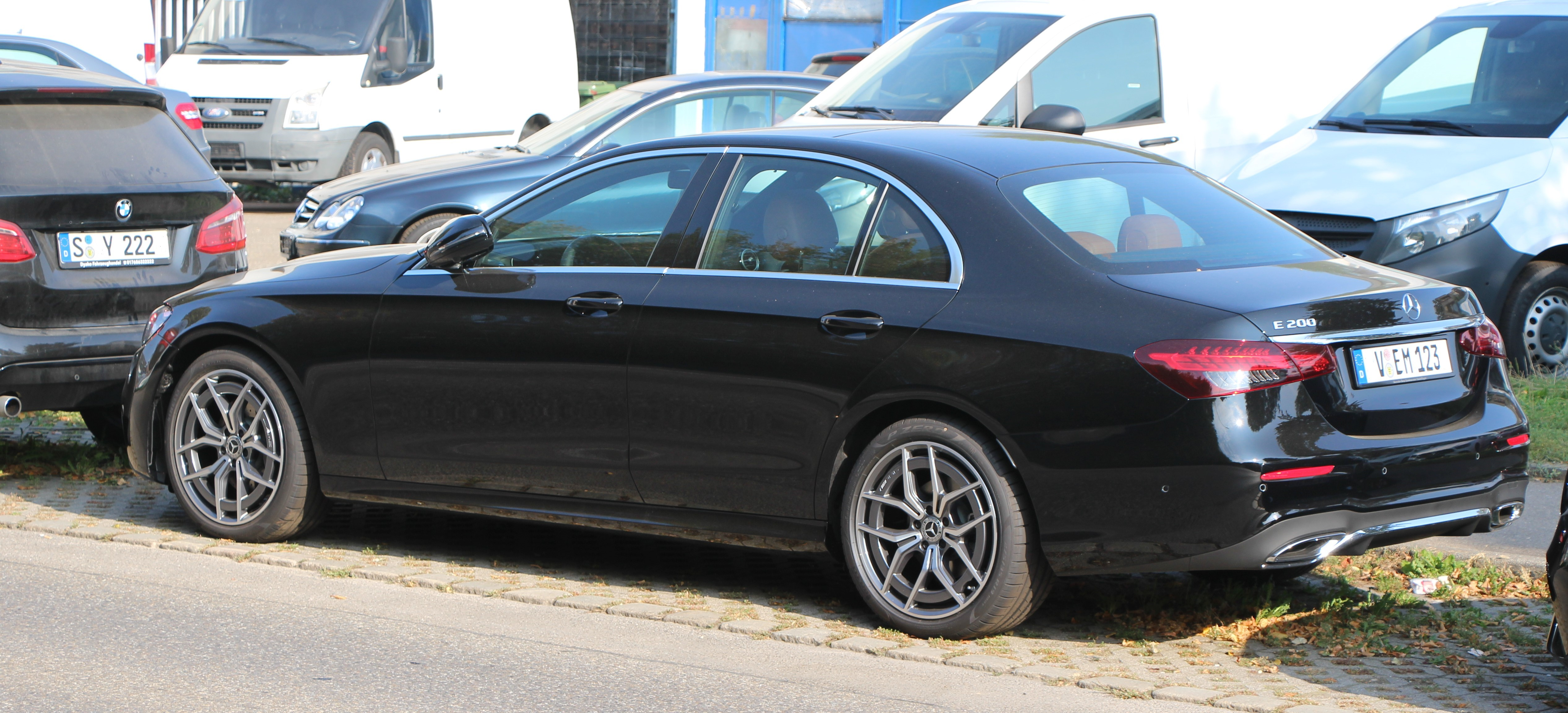
Sedan (facelift)

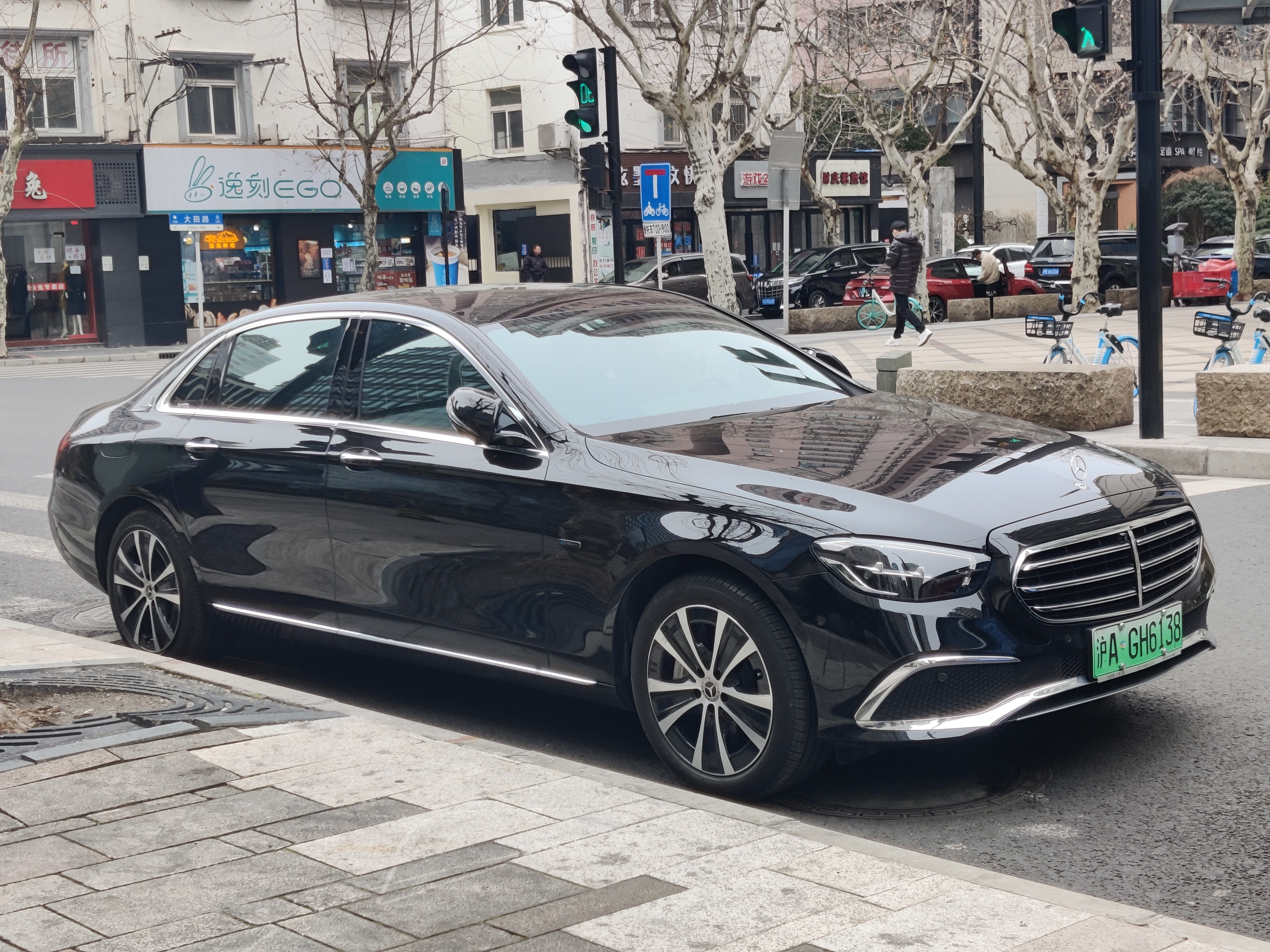
Chinese LWB model Facelift (E350eL)

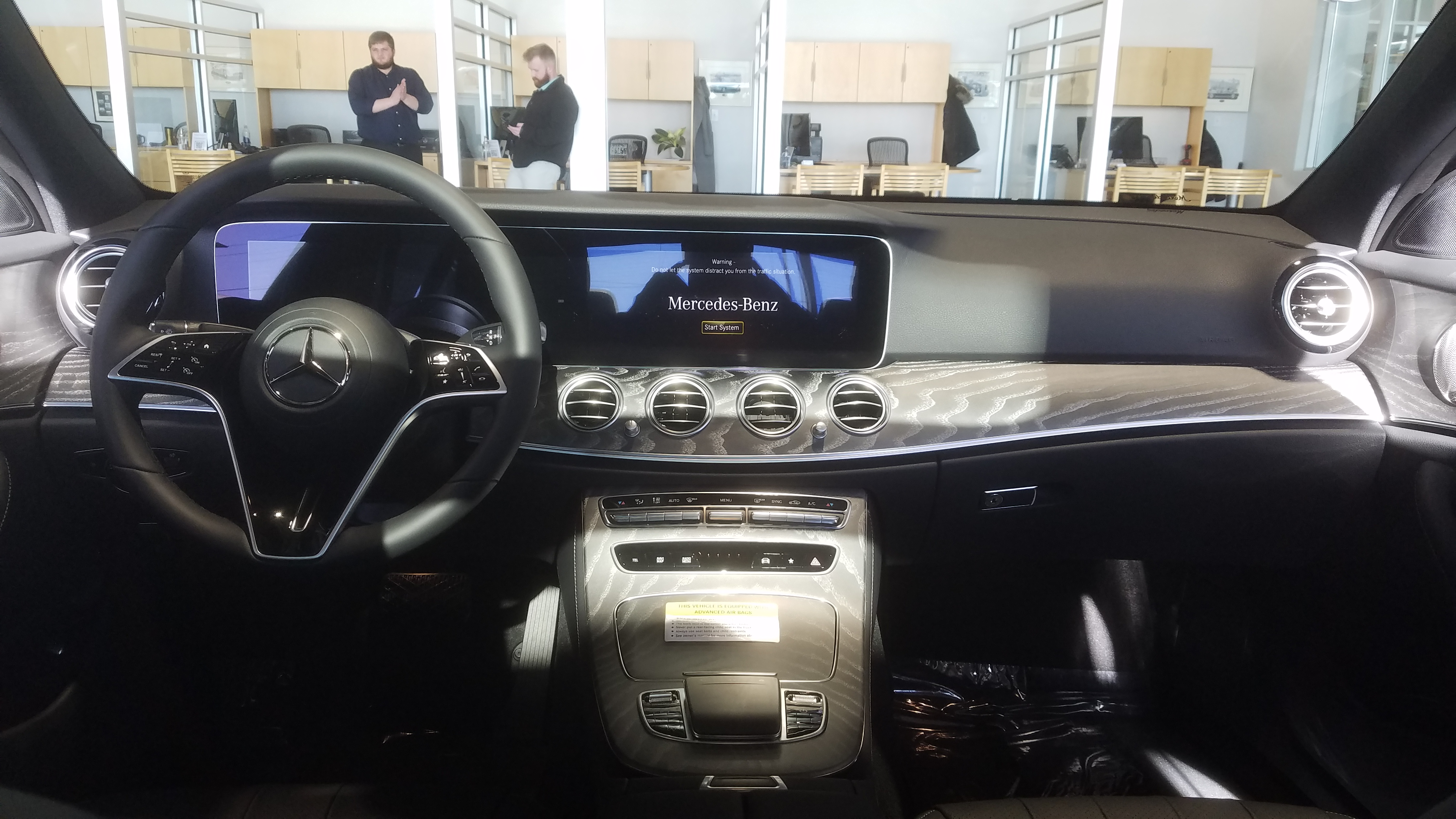
Interior (facelift)

For the 2021 model year, the E-Class has received updated front and rear fascias along with a new mild-hybrid six-cylinder inline engine for the E450 model; the All-Terrain model will now be available in the United States, replacing the standard estate version. It was supposed to be released at the 2020 Geneva Motor Show, which was cancelled due to COVID-19. Inside, COMAND is replaced by MBUX with a 12.3-inch touchscreen and a new steering wheel is used. Driver-assistance technology has also been updated featuring an advanced capacitive hands-off detection system.

Mercedes-AMG announced on 27 May 2020 that the updated Mercedes-AMG versions of coupé and cabriolet are now available. The E 53 4MATIC+ version remains the sole choice for both coupé and cabriolet.

In mid-2022, Mercedes-AMG revealed the Final Edition version of the E 63 S 4Matic+. Signifying the V8’s swansong in production, a total of 999 units were to be built.

=== Engines (2020–2023) ===
Petrol engines
Models	Production years	Engines	Power	Torque
E 180*	2021–2023	1.5 L (1,497 cc) turbocharged 16V I4 (M264 E15 DEH LA)	158 PS (116 kW; 156 hp) at 5,800-6,100 rpm	250 N⋅m (184 lb⋅ft) at 1,500-4,000 rpm
E 200	2020–2023	2.0 L (1,991 cc) turbocharged 16V I4 (M264 E20 DEH LA) + 48V Electric Motor (MHEV)	197 PS (145 kW; 194 hp) + 14 PS (10 kW; 14 hp) at 5,500-6,100 rpm	320 N⋅m (236 lb⋅ft) at 1,650-4,000 rpm
E 200 4MATIC	2020–2023	2.0 L (1,991 cc) turbocharged 16V I4 (M264 E20 DEH LA) + 48V Electric Motor (MHEV)	197 PS (145 kW; 194 hp) + 14 PS (10 kW; 14 hp) at 5,500-6,100 rpm	320 N⋅m (236 lb⋅ft) at 1,650-4,000 rpm
E 300	2020–2023	2.0 L (1,991 cc) turbocharged 16V I4 (M264 E20 DEH LA) + 48V Electric Motor (MHEV)	258 PS (190 kW; 254 hp) + 14 PS (10 kW; 14 hp) at 5,500-6,100 rpm	370 N⋅m (273 lb⋅ft) at 1,800-4,000 rpm
E 450 4MATIC	2020–2023	3.0 L (2,999 cc) turbocharged 24V I6 (M256 E30 DEH LA GR) + 48V Electric Motor (MHEV)	367 PS (270 kW; 362 hp) + 22 PS (16 kW; 22 hp) at 5,500-6,100 rpm	500 N⋅m (369 lb⋅ft) at 1,800-4,500 rpm
AMG E 53 4MATIC+	2020–2023	3.0 L (2,999 cc) turbocharged 24V I6 (M256 E30 DEH LA G) + 48V Electric Motor (MHEV)	435 PS (320 kW; 429 hp) + 22 PS (16 kW; 22 hp) at 6,100 rpm	520 N⋅m (384 lb⋅ft) at 1,800-5,800 rpm
AMG E 63 S 4MATIC+	2020–2023	4.0 L (3,982 cc) twin-turbo 32V V8 (M177 DE40 LA)	612 PS (450 kW; 604 hp) at 5,750-6,500 rpm	850 N⋅m (627 lb⋅ft) at 1,200-3,200 rpm

Diesel engines
Models	Production years	Engines	Power	Torque
E 200d	2020–2023	1.6 L (1,597 cc) turbocharged 16V I4 (OM654 DE16 G SCR)	160 PS (118 kW; 158 hp) at 3,800 rpm	360 N⋅m (266 lb⋅ft) at 1,600-2,600 rpm
E 220d	2020–2023	2.0 L (1,950 cc) turbocharged 16V I4 (OM654 DE20 SCR)	194 PS (143 kW; 191 hp) at 3,800 rpm	400 N⋅m (295 lb⋅ft) at 1,600-2,800 rpm
E 220d 4MATIC	2020–2023	2.0 L (1,950 cc) turbocharged 16V I4 (OM654 DE20 SCR)	194 PS (143 kW; 191 hp) at 3,800 rpm	400 N⋅m (295 lb⋅ft) at 1,600-2,800 rpm
E 300d 4MATIC	2021–2023	2.0 L (1,992 cc) twin-scroll turbo 16V I4 (OM654 DE20 SCR) + 48V Electric Motor (MHEV)	265 PS (195 kW; 261 hp) + 20 PS (15 kW; 20 hp) at 4,200 rpm	550 N⋅m (406 lb⋅ft) + 180 N⋅m (133 lb⋅ft) at 1,800-2,200 rpm
E 400d 4MATIC	2020–2023	2.9 L (2,925 cc) twin-turbo 24V I6 (OM656 DE29TT LA)	330 PS (243 kW; 325 hp) at 3,600-4,200 rpm	700 N⋅m (516 lb⋅ft) at 1,200-3,200 rpm

Hybrid engines
Models	Production years	Engines	Power	Torque
E 300e	2020–2023	2.0 L (1,991 cc) turbocharged 16V I4 (M274 DE20 LA) + Electric Motor (PHEV)	211 PS (155 kW; 208 hp) + 122 PS (90 kW; 120 hp) at 5,500 rpm	350 N⋅m (258 lb⋅ft) + 440 N⋅m (325 lb⋅ft) at 1,200-4,000 rpm
E 300e 4MATIC	2020–2023	2.0 L (1,991 cc) turbocharged 16V I4 (M274 DE20 LA) + Electric Motor (PHEV)	211 PS (155 kW; 208 hp) + 122 PS (90 kW; 120 hp) at 5,500 rpm	350 N⋅m (258 lb⋅ft) + 440 N⋅m (325 lb⋅ft) at 1,200-4,000 rpm
E 300de	2020–2023	2.0 L (1,950 cc) turbocharged 16V I4 (OM654 DE20 SCR) + Electric Motor (PHEV)	194 PS (143 kW; 191 hp) + 122 PS (90 kW; 120 hp) at 3,800 rpm	400 N⋅m (295 lb⋅ft) + 440 N⋅m (325 lb⋅ft) at 1,600-2,800 rpm
E 300de 4MATIC	2020–2023	2.0 L (1,950 cc) turbocharged 16V I4 (OM654 DE20 SCR) + Electric Motor (PHEV)	194 PS (143 kW; 191 hp) + 122 PS (90 kW; 120 hp) at 3,800 rpm	400 N⋅m (295 lb⋅ft) + 440 N⋅m (325 lb⋅ft) at 1,600-2,800 rpm

== Safety ==
ANCAP test results* Mercedes-Benz E-Class all variants (excluding E 350 hybrid) (2016, aligned with Euro NCAP)
Test	Points	%
Overall:	5 /5 stars	
Adult occupant:	36.2	95%
Child occupant:	44.5	90%
Pedestrian:	32.5	77%
Safety assist:	7.4	62%
