= Mercedes-Benz OM654 engine =

Mercedes-Benz OM 654
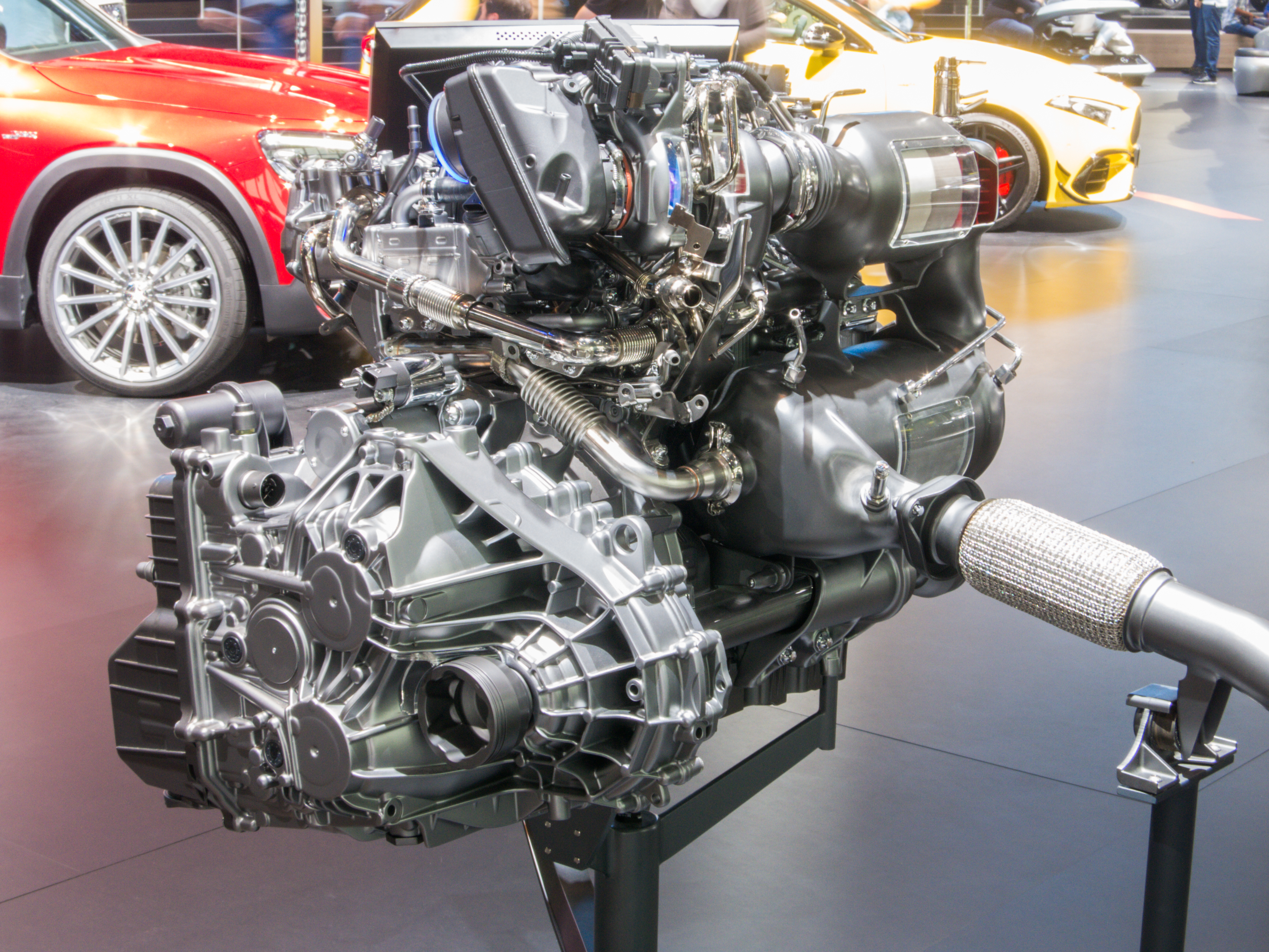

Overview
- Manufacturer: Daimler
- Production: 2016-present

Layout
- Configuration: Inline 4
- Displacement: 1.6 L (1,597 cc) (DE16); 2.0 L (1,950 cc) (DE20); 2.0 L (1,993 cc) (654 M)
- Cylinder bore: 78 mm (3.07 in); 82 mm (3.23 in)
- Piston stroke: 83.6 mm (3.29 in); 92.3 mm (3.63 in); 94.3 mm (3.71 in)
- Cylinder block material: aluminium
- Cylinder head material: aluminium
- Valvetrain: DOHC 4 valves x cyl.
- Compression ratio: 15.5:1

Combustion
- Supercharger: BorgWarner's eBooster® electrically driven compressor Mitsubishi Crankshaft ISG system 48V Electric Motor (OM654 M)
- Turbocharger: Twin-Turbo (earliest top versions) or Single Twin-scroll turbo (latest top versions)
- Fuel system: 4th-generation common rail Direct injection
- Fuel type: EN 590
- Cooling system: Water cooled

Output
- Power output: 90 kW (120 PS; 120 hp) at 3,200-4,600 rpm (C 180d); 110 kW (150 PS; 150 hp) at 3,200-4,800 rpm (C 200d); 120 kW (160 PS; 160 hp) at 3,800 rpm (200d); 143 kW (194 PS; 192 hp) at 3,800 rpm (220d); 195 kW (265 PS; 261 hp) at 4,200 rpm (300d); 198 kW (269 PS; 266 hp) at 4,200 rpm (300d)
- Torque output: 300 N⋅m (221 lbf⋅ft) at 1,400-2,800 rpm (C 180d); 360 N⋅m (266 lbf⋅ft) at 1,600-2,600 rpm (200d); 400 N⋅m (295 lbf⋅ft) at 1,600-2,400 rpm (220d); 550 N⋅m (406 lbf⋅ft) at 1,800-2,200 rpm (300d)

Dimensions
- Dry weight: 168.4 kg (371 lb)

Chronology
- Predecessor: OM651, OM626

The Mercedes-Benz OM 654 is a family of inline-four cylinder automobile diesel engines introduced by Mercedes-Benz in 2016. This is one of the most powerful 2-liter inline-4 cylinder diesel engines with one twin-scroll turbocharger.

== OM 654 ==
The engine is a 2.0 litres (1,950 cc) turbo-diesel cast aluminum block, inline four-cylinder with balancing shafts. It has a single turbo and its cylinder walls are lined with slippery Nanoslide, an iron-carbon coating that cuts friction. In the 200-configuration it produces 110 kW (150 PS; 148 hp) at 4,500 rpm with peak torque of 320 N⋅m (236 lbf⋅ft) at 1,400-3,200 rpm. In the 220-configuration it produces 143 kW (194 PS; 192 hp) at 3,800 rpm with peak torque of 400 N⋅m (295 lbf⋅ft) at 1,600-2,400 rpm. The engine weight is 168.4 kg (371 lb) (a 17% improvement over the 202.8 kg (447 lb) of the previous 2.1 litres (2,143 cc) OM651). Also, the engine consumes 13% less fuel than its predecessor. It is planned that it will feature across the entire Mercedes-Benz range of cars and vans. Both the 200d and 220d are mated to a 9-speed torque converter automatic transmission developed by Mercedes-Benz. A ZF 716.7 6-speed manual transmission was also offered in the european market as an alternative, although it is relatively rare due to its limited sales.

=== Applications ===
Model	Years
Mercedes-Benz A 180d (W177)	2021–present
Mercedes-Benz A 200d (W177)	2018–present
Mercedes-Benz A 220d/A 220d 4MATIC (W177)	2018–present
Mercedes-Benz B 200d (W247)	2018–present
Mercedes-Benz B 220d/B 220d 4MATIC (W247)	2018–present
Mercedes-Benz CLA 200d/ CLA 200d 4MATIC (C118)	2018–present
Mercedes-Benz CLA 220d/CLA 220d 4MATIC (C118)	2018–present
Mercedes-Benz CLS 220d (C257)	2018–present
Mercedes-Benz CLS 300d/CLS 300d 4MATIC (C257)	2018–present
Mercedes-Benz C 220d/C 220d 4MATIC (W205)	2018–2021
Mercedes-Benz C 300d/C 300d 4MATIC (W205)	2018–2021
Mercedes-Benz C 300de (W205)	2018–2021
Mercedes-Benz E 200d/E 220d/E 220d 4MATIC (W213)	2016–present
Mercedes-Benz E 300d/E 300d 4MATIC (W213)	2018–present
Mercedes-Benz E 300de/E 300de 4MATIC (W213)	2018–present
Mercedes-Benz GLA 200d/GLA 200d 4MATIC (H247)	2020–present
Mercedes-Benz GLA 220d 4MATIC (H247)	2020–present
Mercedes-Benz GLB 200d/GLB 200d 4MATIC (X247)	2019–present
Mercedes-Benz GLB 220d 4MATIC (X247)	2019–present
Mercedes-Benz GLC 200d/GLC 200d 4MATIC (X253)	2020–present
Mercedes-Benz GLC 220d 4MATIC (X253)	2020–present
Mercedes-Benz GLC 300d 4MATIC (X253)	2020–present
Mercedes-Benz GLC 300de 4MATIC (X253)	2020–present
Mercedes-Benz GLE 300d 4MATIC (W167)	2020–present
Mercedes-Benz GLE 350de 4MATIC (W167)	2020–present
Mercedes-Benz C 200d (W206)	2021–present
Mercedes-Benz C 220d/C 220d 4MATIC (W206)	2021–present
Mercedes-Benz C 300d/C 300d 4MATIC (W206)	2021–present
Mercedes-Benz V-Class & Vito	2020–present
Mercedes-Benz Sprinter	mid-2020–present

== OM 654q ==
A transverse version of OM654 that can be mounted in smaller cars and front-wheel-drive vehicles.

== OM 654 M ==
With the OM 654 M, Mercedes claims to deliver the worldwide first diesel engine with integrated starter generator. The revised two-liter turbodiesel four-cylinder was given a new crankshaft for electrification, increasing the displacement by 43 to 1,993 cubic centimeters. At the same time, the injection pressure will be increased from 2,500 to 2,700 bar. The maximum power is now 265 hp, the maximum torque 550 Newton meters. On the exhaust side, a NOX storage catalytic converter, particle filter and two SCR catalytic converters have been retrofitted.
