= Mercedes-Benz M260/M264 engine =

Mercedes-Benz M260/M264
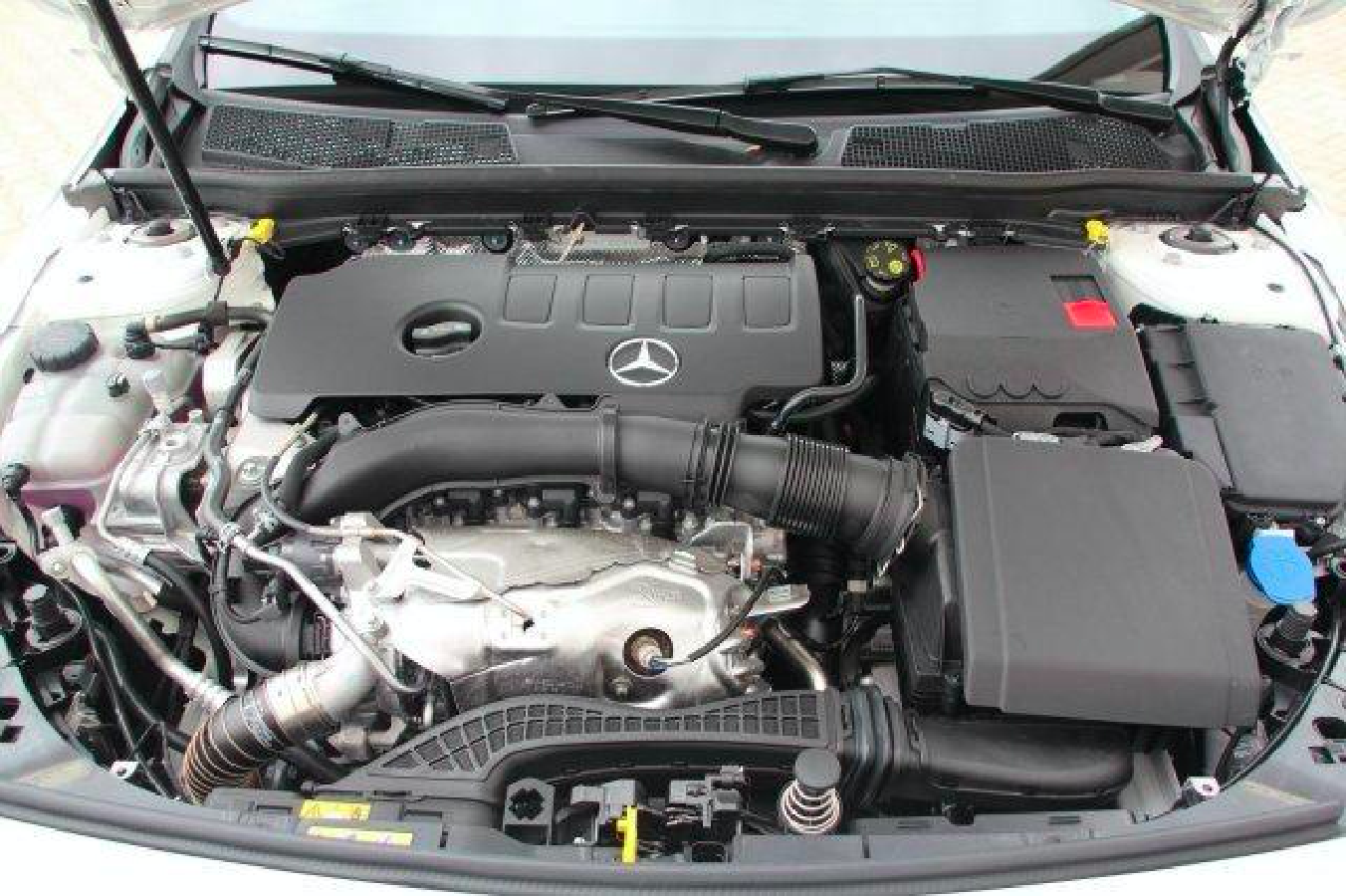

Overview
- Manufacturer: Mercedes-Benz
- Production: 2017–present

Layout
- Configuration: Inline-four engine
- Displacement: 1.5 L (1,497 cc) (M264); 2.0 L (1,991 cc) (M260, M264)
- Cylinder bore: 80.4 mm (3.17 in); 83 mm (3.27 in)
- Piston stroke: 73.7 mm (2.90 in); 92 mm (3.62 in)
- Cylinder block material: Aluminium alloy
- Cylinder head material: Aluminium alloy
- Valvetrain: DOHC 4 valves x cyl. with VVT
- Compression ratio: 10.5:1

Combustion
- Supercharger: BorgWarner's e-Booster (2019–)
- Turbocharger: Single twin-scroll
- Fuel system: Direct injection
- Fuel type: Petrol
- Cooling system: Water cooled

Output
- Power output: 135–225 kW (184–306 PS; 181–302 hp)
- Torque output: 280–400 N⋅m (207–295 lb⋅ft)

Chronology
- Predecessor: M270/M274
- Successor: M254 (for 1.5 / 2.0L M264)

The M260 and M264 are turbocharged inline-four engines produced by Mercedes-Benz since 2017. It is the successor to the M270 and M274 engine.

== Design ==
Both engines are based upon the outgoing M270 and the M274 respectively. Like the M270 and the M274, the M260 refers to the transverse configuration (for front-wheel drive models) while the M264 refers to the longitudinally mounted engine (for rear-wheel drive models). They use dual overhead camshafts with 4 valves per cylinder, feature twin-scroll turbochargers, and have particulate filters installed. M264 engines also have intake variable valve timing and a 48V system that powers the electric auxiliary compressor and integrated starter alternator. However, unlike M256 which uses a BorgWarner electric auxiliary compressor, the M264 has a belt-driven starter-alternator combo as well as a 48V electric water pump.

== Models ==
Engine	Displacement	Power	Torque	Years
M260 E20; DE LA D260.920	2.0 L; 121.5 cu in (1,991 cc)	140 kW (190 PS; 188 hp) at 5,500 rpm	300 N⋅m (221 lbf⋅ft) at 1,800–4,000 rpm	2017–
M260 E20; DE LA D260.920	2.0 L; 121.5 cu in (1,991 cc)	165 kW (224 PS; 221 hp) at 5,500 rpm	350 N⋅m (258 lb⋅ft) at 1,800–4,000 rpm	2017–
M260 E20; DE LA D260.920	2.0 L; 121.5 cu in (1,991 cc)	225 kW (306 PS; 302 hp) at 5,800-6,100 rpm	400 N⋅m (295 lbf⋅ft) at 3,000–4,000 rpm	2017–
M264 E15; DEH LA D264.915	1.5 L; 91.4 cu in (1,497 cc)	116 kW (158 PS; 156 hp)	250 N⋅m (184 lb⋅ft)	2017–
M264 E15; DEH LA D264.915	1.5 L; 91.4 cu in (1,497 cc)	125 kW (170 PS; 168 hp)	250 N⋅m (184 lb⋅ft)	2017–
M264 E15; DEH LA D264.915	1.5 L; 91.4 cu in (1,497 cc)	135 kW (184 PS; 181 hp) at 5,800–6,100 rpm	280 N⋅m (207 lb⋅ft) at 1,800–4,000 rpm	2017–
M264 E15; DEH LA D264.915	1.5 L; 91.4 cu in (1,497 cc)	150 kW (204 PS; 201 hp)	300 N⋅m (221 lb⋅ft)	2017–
M264 E20; DEH LA D264.920	2.0 L; 121.5 cu in (1,991 cc)	145 kW (197 PS; 194 hp) at 5,800–6,100 rpm	320 N⋅m (236 lb⋅ft) at 1,650–4,000 rpm	2019–
M264 E20; DEH LA D264.920	2.0 L; 121.5 cu in (1,991 cc)	190 kW (258 PS; 255 hp) at 5,800–6,100 rpm	370 N⋅m (273 lb⋅ft) at 1,800–4,000 rpm	2017–
M264 E20; DEH LA D264.920	2.0 L; 121.5 cu in (1,991 cc)	220 kW (299 PS; 295 hp) at 5,800–6,100 rpm	400 N⋅m (295 lb⋅ft) at 3,000–4,000 rpm	2017–

=== M260 E20 DE LA ===
- 2018–2021 W177 A 220, W247 B 220, C118 CLA 220
- 2019–present W177 A 250, W247 B 250, C118 CLA 250, H247 GLA 250, X247 GLB 250
- 2019–present W177 AMG A 35 4MATIC, C118 AMG CLA 35 4MATIC, H247 AMG GLA 35 4MATIC, X247 AMG GLB 35 4MATIC

=== M264 E15 DEH LA ===
- 2019–present W213 E 180 (without EQ Boost for Pakistan, Bangladesh, Singapore, Egypt and Vietnam)
- 2020–present C257 CLS 260 (Chinese market)
- 2019–present W205 C 180 (without EQ Boost)
- 2021–present W206 C 180 (with EQ Boost)
- 2021–present W206 C 200 (with EQ Boost)

=== M264 E20 DEH LA ===
- GLE (2020–2023)
  - 167.148 GLE 350
  - 167.149 GLE 350 4MATIC
  - 167.349 GLE 350 4MATIC
- C-Class (2018–2021)
  - 205.079 C 200 4MATIC Limousine
  - 205.090 C 200 Limousine
  - 205.083 C 300 Limousine
  - 205.084 C 300 4MATIC Limousine
  - 205.183 C 300 Limousine (long wheelbase)
  - 205.280 C 200 T-Modell
  - 205.283 C 300 T-Modell
  - 205.283 C 300 T-Modell (With EQ Boost)
  - 205.284 C 300 4MATIC T-Modell
  - 205.379 C 200 4MATIC Coupé
  - 205.380 C 200 Coupé
  - 205.383 C 300 Coupé
  - 205.384 C 300 4MATIC Coupé
  - 205.480 C 200 Cabriolet
  - 205.483 C 300 Cabriolet
  - 205.484 C 300 4MATIC Cabriolet
- E-Class (2019–2023)
  - 213.080 E 200 Limousine
  - 213.083 E 300 Limousine / E 350 Limousine
  - 213.084 E 350 4MATIC Limousine
  - 213.085 E 350 Limousine
  - 213.086 E 350 4MATIC Limousine
  - 213.087 E 200 4MATIC Limousine
  - 213.180 E 200 Limousine (long wheelbase)
  - 213.183 E 300 Limousine (long wheelbase)
  - 213.186 E 350 4MATIC Limousine (long wheelbase)
  - 213.187 E 260 L 4MATIC
  - 213.279 E 200 4MATIC All-Terrain T-Modell
  - 213.280 E 200 T-Modell
  - 213.283 E 300 T-Modell
  - 213.287 E 200 4MATIC T-Model
  - 238.380 E 200 Coupé
  - 238.383 E 300 Coupé
  - 238.385 E 350 Coupé
  - 238.386 E 350 4MATIC Coupé
  - 238.387 E 200 4MATIC Coupé
  - 238.480 E 200 Cabriolet
  - 238.483 E 300 Cabriolet
  - 238.485 E 350 Cabriolet
  - 238.487 E 200 4MATIC Cabriolet
- S-Class (2017–2020)
  - 222.150 S 320 Limousine (long wheelbase)
- GLC (2020–2022)
  - 253.180 GLC 260 Limousine (long wheelbase)
  - 253.181 GLC 260 4MATIC Limousine (long wheelbase)
  - 253.184 GLC 300 4MATIC Limousine (long wheelbase)
  - 253.380 GLC 200 Coupé / GLC 260 Coupé
  - 253.381 GLC 200 4MATIC Coupé / GLC 260 4MATIC Coupé
  - 253.384 GLC 300 4MATIC Coupé
  - 253.980 GLC 200 Off-Roader
  - 253.981 GLC 200 4MATIC Off-Roader
  - 253.983 GLC 300 Off-Roader
  - 253.984 GLC 300 4MATIC Off-Roader
- CLS (2020–2023)
  - 257.348 CLS 300 Coupé
  - 257.350 CLS 350 Coupé
  - 257.351 CLS 350 4MATIC Coupé
- G-Class (2020–2024 Chinese market)
  - 463.210 G 350
