= Aston Martin DBX =

British luxury crossover

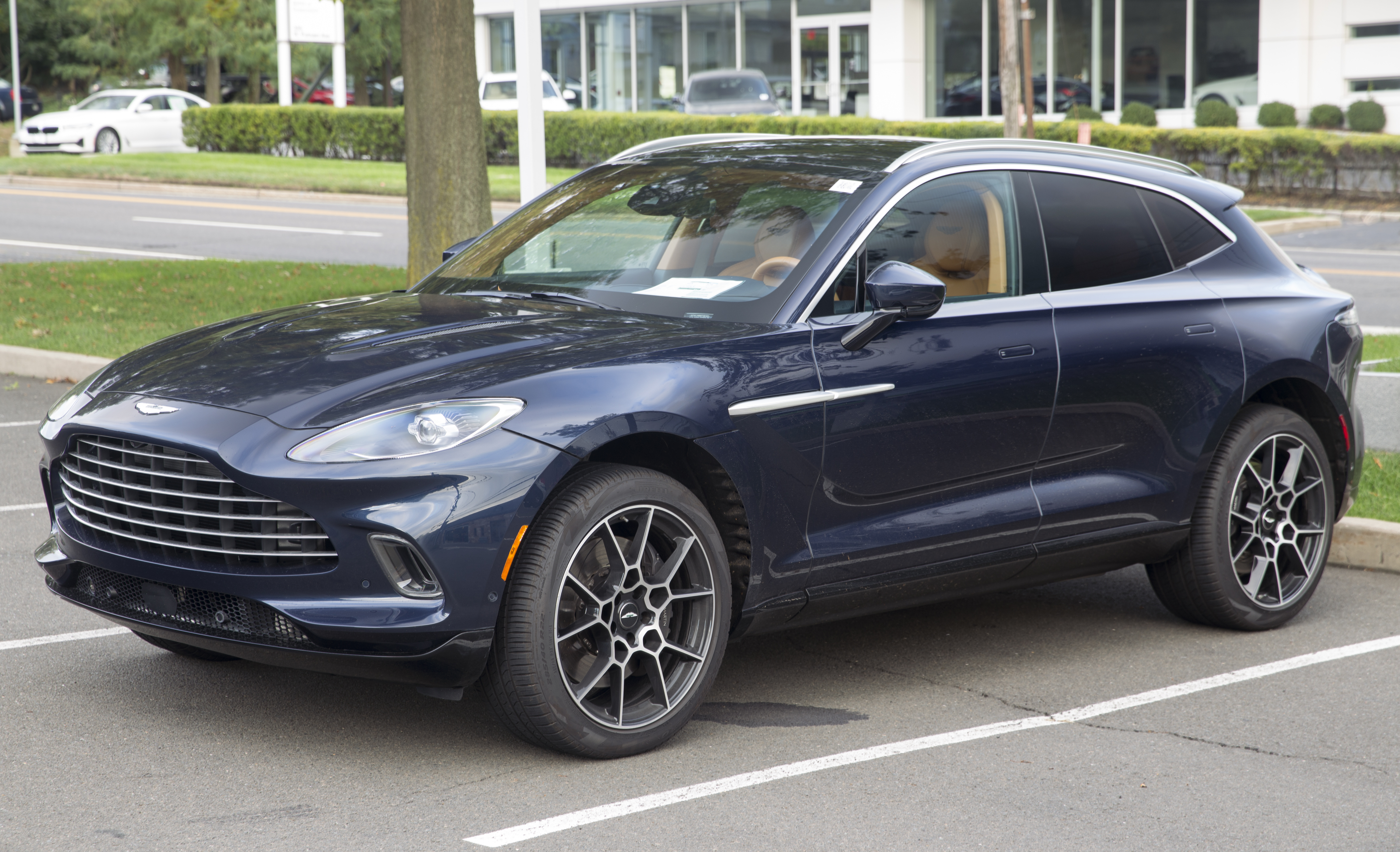

Overview
- Manufacturer: Aston Martin
- Model code: AM8
- Production: July 2020–present
- Assembly: United Kingdom: St Athan, South Wales (Aston Martin Lagonda Saint Athan)
- Designer: Marek Reichman

Body and chassis
- Class: Luxury crossover SUV
- Body style: 5-door SUV
- Layout: Front-engine, four-wheel-drive
- Doors: 4, swan-hinged doors
- Related: Aston Martin Vantage (2018)

Powertrain
- Engine: 3.0 L Mercedes-AMG M256 turbocharged I6 (China); 4.0 L Mercedes-AMG M177 twin-turbocharged V8
- Power output: 550 PS (405 kW) (DBX); 435 PS (320 kW) (China-only DBX); 707 PS (520 kW) (DBX707); 727 PS (535 kW) (DBX S, DBX GT)
- Transmission: 9-speed 9G-Tronic automatic
- Hybrid drivetrain: 4WD, AWD

Dimensions
- Wheelbase: 3,060 mm (120.5 in)
- Length: 5,039 mm (198.4 in)
- Width: 1,998 mm (78.7 in)
- Height: 1,680 mm (66.1 in)
- Kerb weight: 2,245 kg (4,949.4 lb)

The Aston Martin DBX is a crossover SUV produced by British luxury car marque Aston Martin since 2020. It is the first SUV the company has made. It has been described as both a "full-sized" and as a "mid-sized" vehicle.

== Design ==
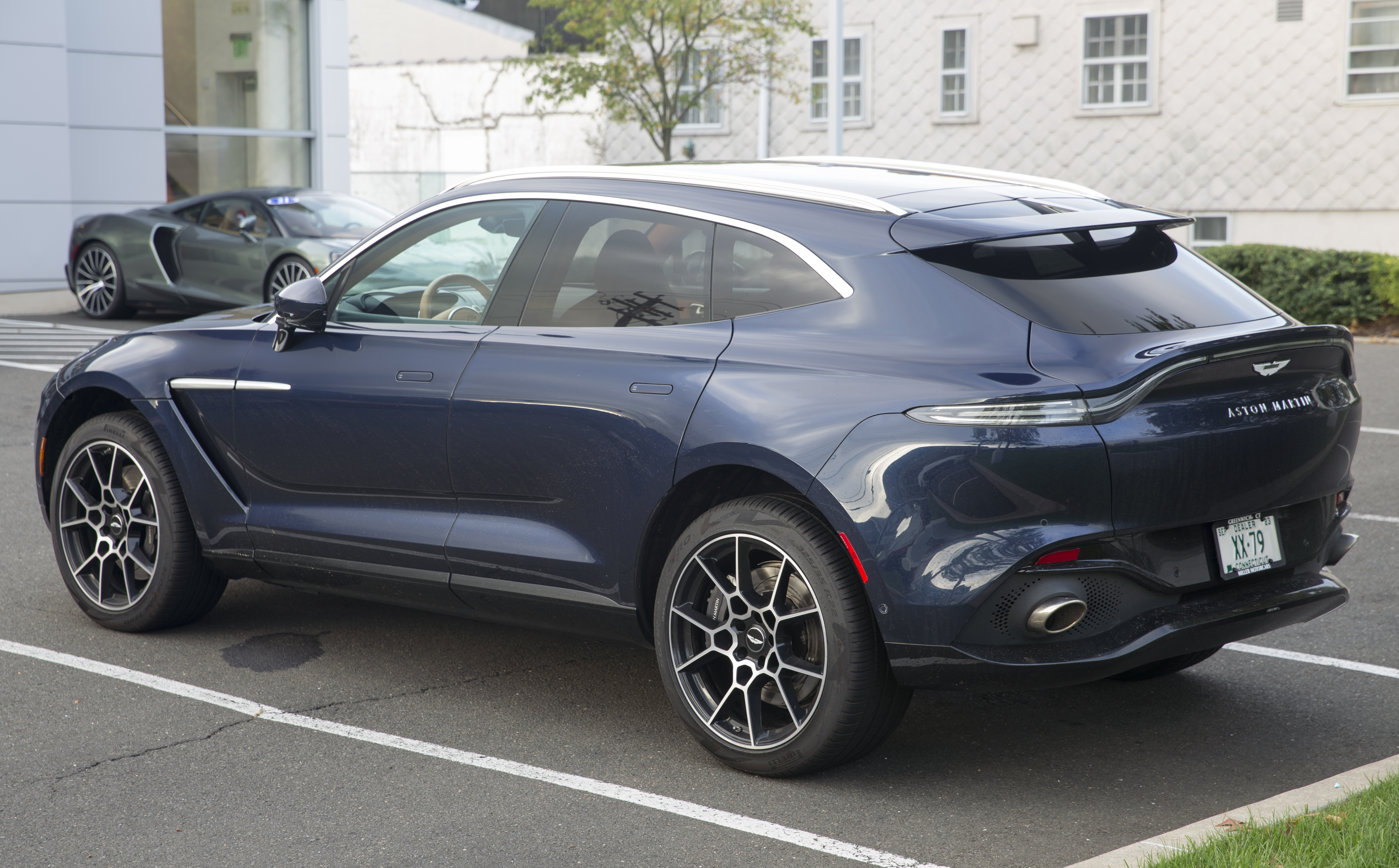
Rear view

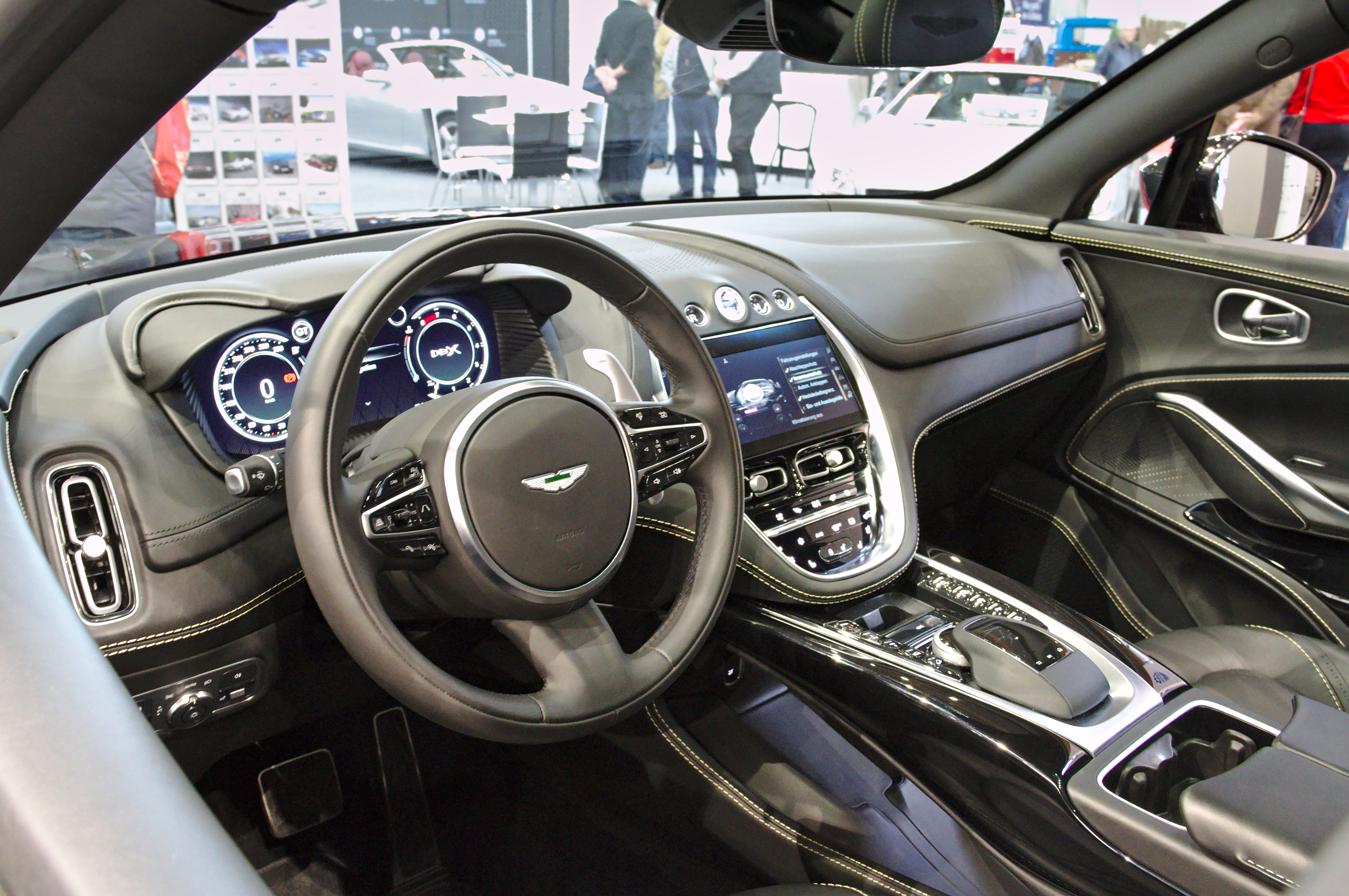
Interior

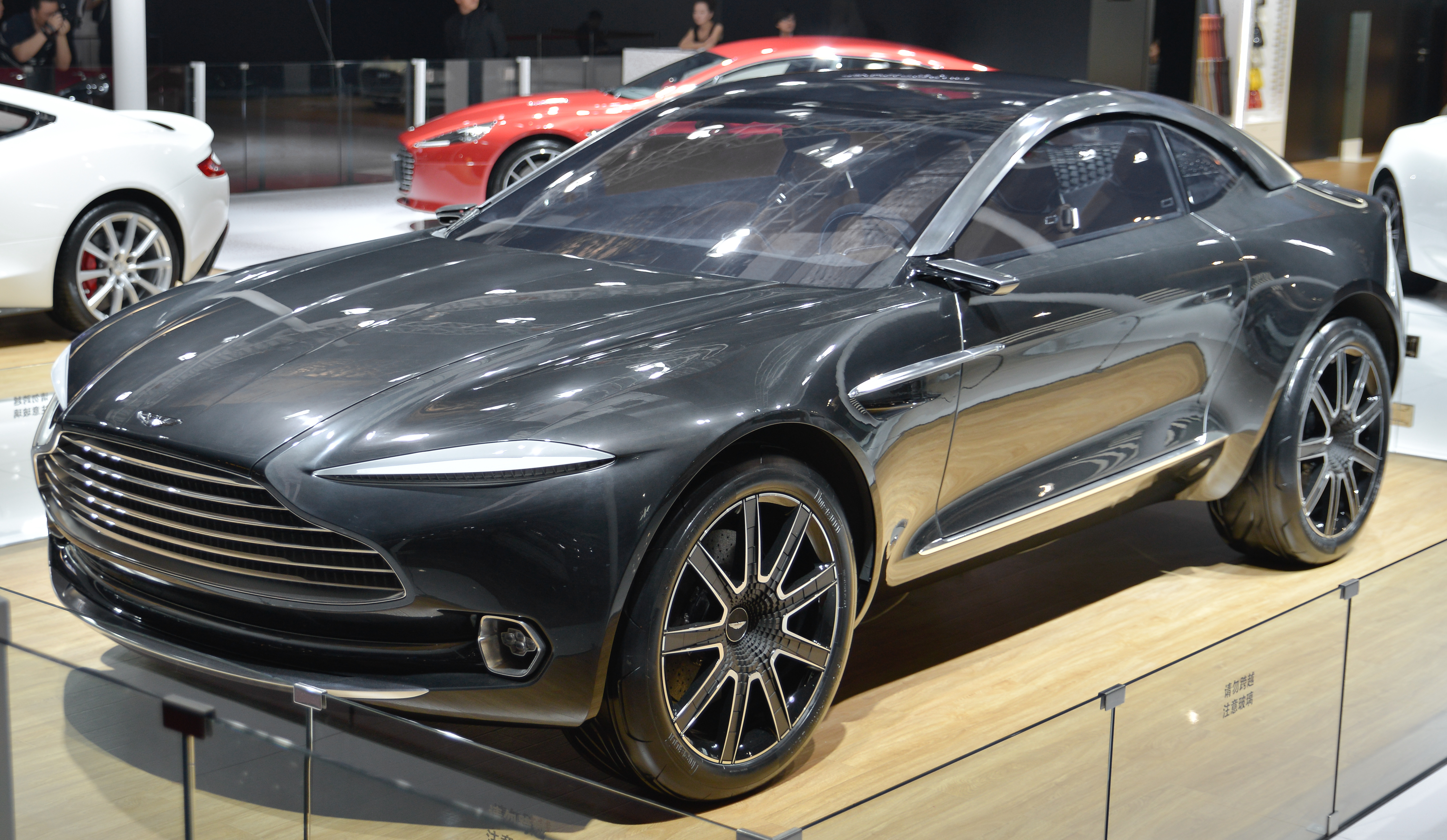
Concept

The DBX is the first car made at Aston Martin's new facility in St Athan, Wales. According to executive vice president and chief creative officer Marek Reichman, the wheelbase of the DBX stretches as far out as possible for the wheels to be positioned at the corners of the vehicle, which, with the low roofline, creates the illusion of a smaller car, helping make the DBX appear more like a traditional Aston Martin shape. The DBX features swan-hinged doors, while the front grille is the largest ever fitted on an Aston Martin.

It has been described by the BBC and The Daily Telegraph as the "first full-size five-seater" model that Aston Martin has sold. US publications described it as a "mid-sized crossover".

== Specifications and performance ==
While related to the Vantage, the DBX is built on its own dedicated platform. Like other Aston Martin models, it is constructed with bonded aluminium panels and extrusions. The powertrain and infotainment technology are borrowed from Mercedes-Benz. The DBX uses Mercedes-AMG's M177 4.0-litre twin-turbocharged V8 engine that has a power output of 550 PS (405 kW; 542 hp) and 700 N⋅m (516 lb⋅ft) of torque. The DBX is capable of accelerating from 0–100 km/h (0–62 mph) in 4.5 seconds, and attaining a top speed of 292 km/h (181 mph).

A 9-speed automatic gearbox is standard, and towing is rated at up to 2,700 kg (6,000 lb). Its emissions are NEDC Combined CO_{2} 269g/km and its UK combined mpg is 19.73. A 48-volt electric active roll system counteracts body roll under hard cornering, and the vehicle comes with five driving modes: a default GT, Sport, Sport Plus, Terrain and Terrain Plus with an additional Access mode. An active centre transfer case directs torque to the front axle when it is required, and there is also an electronic limited slip rear differential. Adaptive dampers and triple-chamber air springs are both standard, offering a significant range of height adjustment.

In November 2021, a new engine was introduced for the DBX. Only available in China, this engine is Mercedes-AMG's M256 3.0-litre turbocharged I6. It has a power output of 435 PS (320 kW; 429 hp) and 520 N⋅m (384 lb⋅ft) of torque.

== Aston Martin DBX707 (2022–present) ==
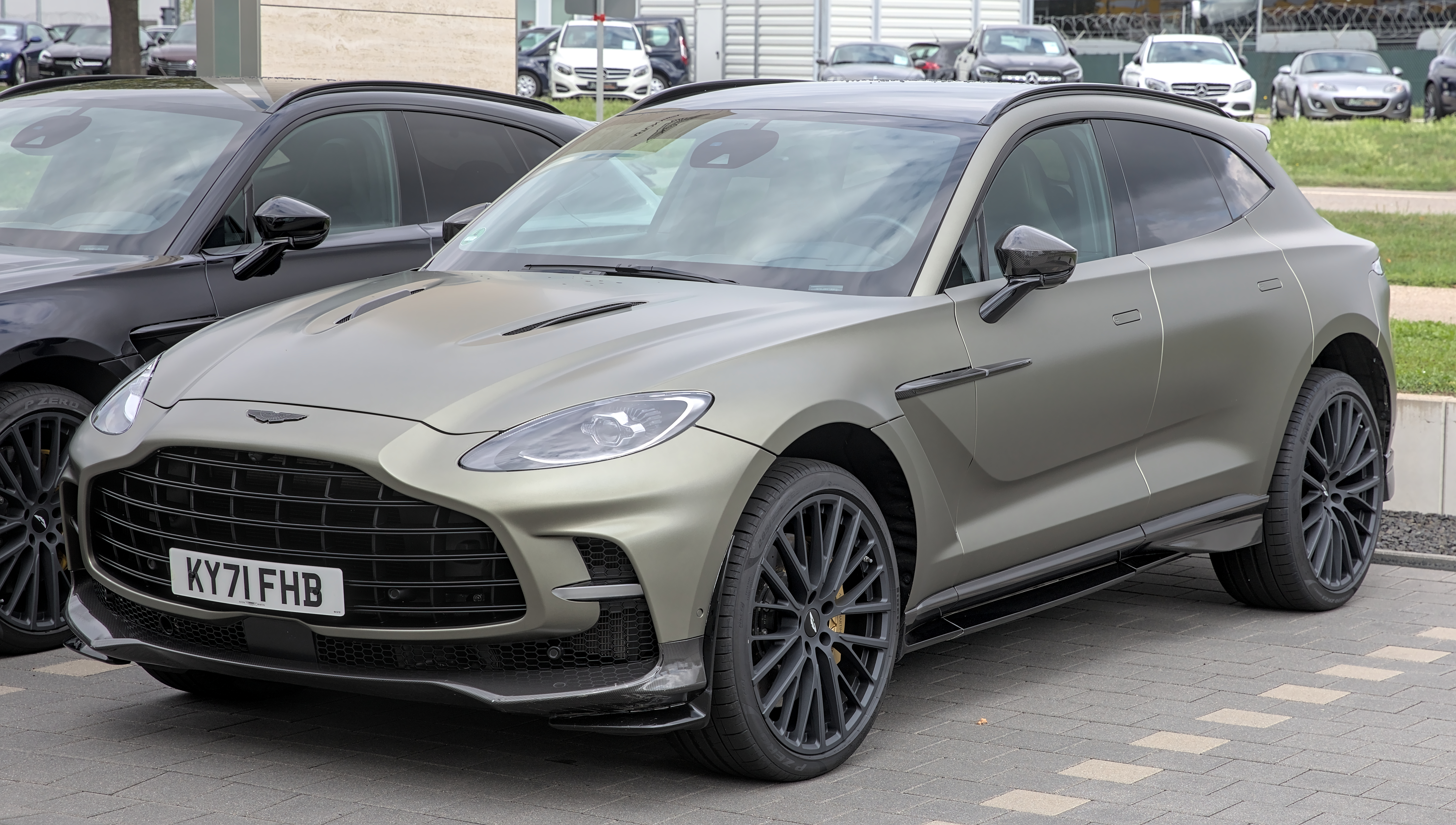
DBX707

On 1 February 2022, Aston Martin unveiled their most powerful crossover – the Aston Martin DBX707. Its M177 engine was slightly modified by Aston Martin and received new turbochargers with ball bearings, generating a maximum power output of 707 PS (520 kW; 697 hp) and 900 N⋅m (664 lb⋅ft) of torque. AMG's MCT 9G-Tronic transmission has also been upgraded to receive "wet clutch" and changed gear ratios. In total, all modifications allow the sports crossover to accelerate from 0–60 mph (0–97 km/h) in 3.1 seconds and reach a top speed of 310 km/h (193 mph). The changes also affected the suspension and steering. At the rear of the car is a carbon spoiler and splitter, as well as a four-barrel exhaust system. The base of the car is equipped with standard 22-inch wheels and 23-inch version is available as optional.

For the 2025 model year, the DBX707 received an updated interior and infotainment system similar to the DB12. The standard DBX was also dropped.

== Aston Martin DBX S (2025–present) ==
In April 2025, Aston Martin unveiled the DBX S, a lighter and more powerful version of the DBX707. It receives DBX S badging throughout the vehicle, new livery options, and an exclusive stacked quad exhaust setup. A variety of lightweight options are available, such as a polycarbonate honeycomb mesh grille, carbon fiber roof, the omission of roof rails, 23-inch forged magnesium wheels. Other exterior trims can also be optioned in carbon fiber. Combined, the DBX S's weight can be reduced by up to 103 lb (47 kg). Meanwhile, the engine generates an increased maximum power output of 727 PS (535 kW; 717 hp) while torque remains unchanged at 900 N⋅m (664 lb⋅ft). Additionally, changes have been made to the exhaust and gearbox. The DBX S accelerates from 0–62 mph (0–100 km/h) in 3.3 seconds and is 0.3 seconds quicker to 200 km/h (124 mph) than the DBX707. The top speed remains unchanged at 310 km/h (193 mph).

== Aston Martin DBX GT (2026–present) ==
In October 2026, Aston Martin unveiled the DBX GT, a luxury-oriented variant of the DBX S. Compared to other DBX models, it features an exclusive dual-vaned grille, GT-specific 22-inch wheels, exterior trims finished in bright silver as standard, and quad exhausts setup horizontally similar to the DBX707. Meanwhile, the interior features reshaped seats with an additional memory foam layer, a "4+1" seat configuration as standard with individual rear seats and an occasional middle seat, and exclusive "jewellery-quality" interior finishes. A panoramic sunroof is available as standard. The body structure, sound dampening materials, exhaust and suspension have also been specifically retuned for the DBX GT. It uses the same V8 engine as the DBX S, with the same power output and performance.

== Sales ==
Fiscal Year	Total
2020	1,516
2021	3,001
2022	3,219
2023	2,939
2024	1,887
2025	1,717

== Formula One Medical Car ==
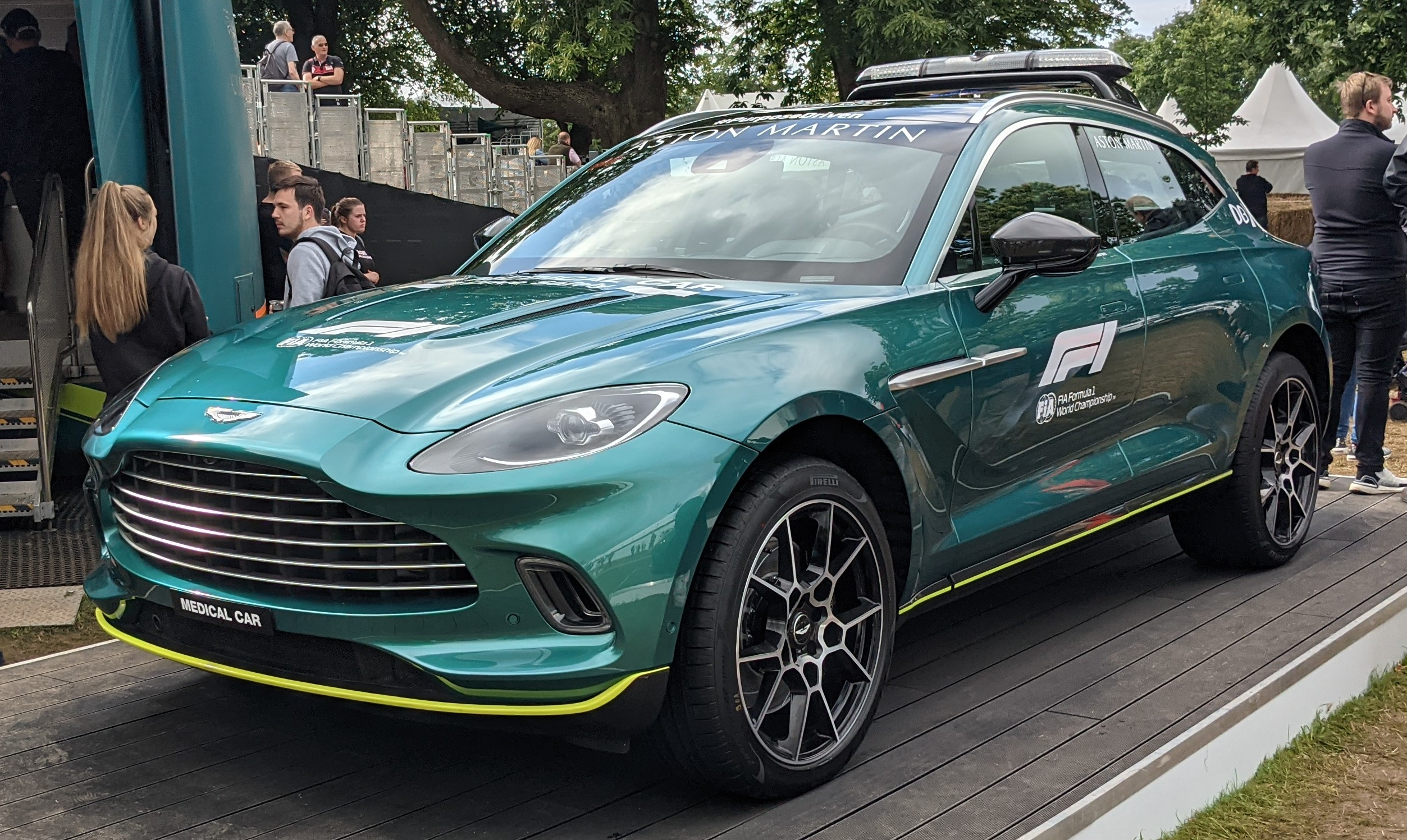
F1 Medical car

In 2021, it was announced that the DBX would become the official Formula One Medical Car, joining the Mercedes C63S AMG Estate Medical Car (and later the Mercedes-AMG GT 4-Door for the 2022 season). The DBX Medical Car has a British Racing Green livery with neon yellow accents. It joined the Aston Martin Vantage as part of Formula One's new safety fleet.

Beginning with the 2023 season, the DBX707 replaced the standard DBX as the Formula One Medical Car.
