= Mercedes-AMG GT SUV =

Overview
- Manufacturer: Mercedes-AMG
- Model code: X591
- Production: 2027 (to commence)
- Model years: 2027
- Assembly: Germany: Sindelfingen
- Designer: Michael Han

Body and chassis
- Class: Mid-size luxury crossover SUV
- Body style: 5-door SUV
- Layout: Dual/tri-motor, all-wheel-drive
- Platform: AMG.EA
- Related: Mercedes-AMG GT 4-door Coupé (C590)

Powertrain
- Electric motor: 2× Permanent magnet motors (1 front and 1 rear; GT 53); 3× YASA axial flux motors (1 front and 2 rear; GT 55 & 63)
- Power output: 400 kW (536 hp; 544 PS) (GT 53); 600 kW (805 hp; 816 PS) (GT 55); 860 kW (1,153 hp; 1,169 PS) (GT 63)
- Battery: AMG 800-volt High Performance Battery, 106 or 128-kWh lithium-ion NMC
- Range: Maximum 700 km (435 mi) (WLTP, claimed)

Dimensions
- Wheelbase: 3,040 mm (119.7 in)
- Length: 5,084 mm (200.2 in)
- Width: 1,953 mm (76.9 in)
- Height: 1,656 mm (65.2 in)

Rear View

The Mercedes-AMG GT SUV is a battery electric mid-size luxury crossover SUV manufactured by Mercedes-AMG. It is closely related to the second generation Mercedes-AMG GT 4-door Coupé and is considered as its SUV variant.

== Overview ==
The AMG GT SUV was officially revealed on 17 October 2026 at The Mercedes-Benz The 140 Festival.

Its exterior design features many shared design elements with the AMG GT 4-door Coupé, such as the illuminated Panamericana grille, front daytime running lights in the shape of three pointed stars, and six circular taillights also housing a three pointed star each, placed within a gloss black panel.

Its interior is largely carried over from the AMG GT 4-door Coupé, featuring a 10.2-inch instrument panel, 14-inch central infotainment display tilted towards the driver, and a 14-inch passenger display.

== Powertrain and chassis ==
The AMG GT SUV rides on the AMG-exclusive 800 volt AMG.EA platform alongside the AMG GT 4-door Coupé. Three powertrains are available. The AMG GT53 has a dual-motor configuration, producing 544 hp (406 kW; 552 PS) and accelerating from 0-100 km/h (62 mph) in 4.2 seconds. It also features a two-speed transmission. The AMG GT55 and GT63 have tri-motor configurations, producing a combined 816 hp (608 kW; 827 PS) and 1,169 hp (872 kW; 1,185 PS) respectively, while accelerating from 0-100 km/h (62 mph) of 3.1 and 2.7 seconds respectively. Both tri-motor variants use torque vectoring to control each rear wheel independently.

Two batteries with a usable capacity of either 106 or 128 kW are available, offering a claimed driving range of up to 370 mi (600 km).
