= Mercedes-Benz CLS (C257) =

Third and last generation of CLS German car

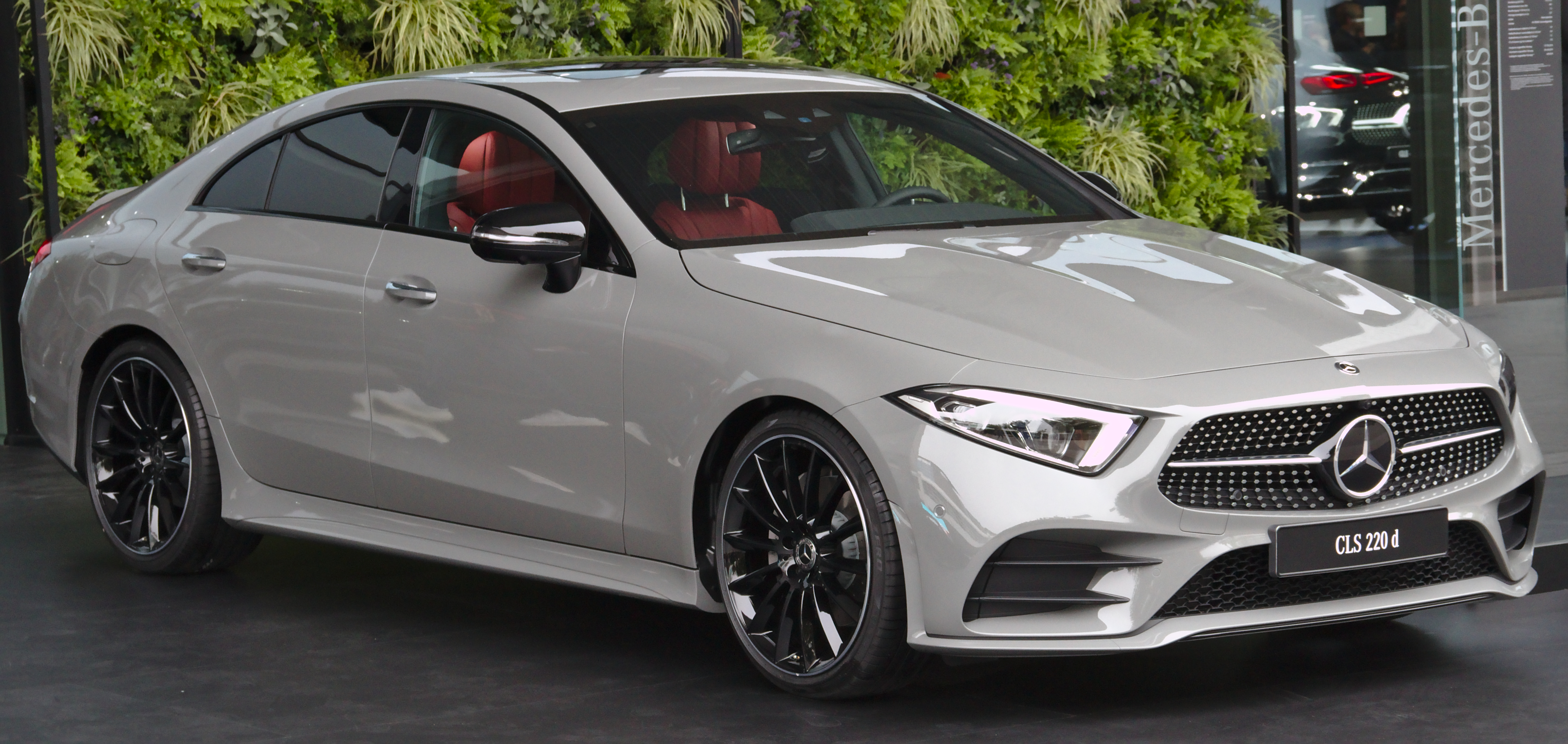

Overview
- Manufacturer: Daimler AG
- Production: January 2018 – August 2023
- Model years: 2018–2023
- Assembly: Germany: Sindelfingen; Thailand: Samut Prakan (TAAP)
- Designer: Robert Lešnik, Balázs Filczer and Laurent Olivier under Gorden Wagener

Body and chassis
- Class: Executive car (E)
- Body style: 4-door sedan
- Layout: Front-engine, rear-wheel-drive or all-wheel-drive (4Matic)
- Platform: MRA
- Related: Mercedes-AMG GT 4-Door Coupé; Mercedes-Benz E-Class (W213); Mercedes-Benz S-Class (W222); Mercedes-Benz S-Class (C217)

Powertrain
- Engine: Petrol: 1.5 L M264 Mild Hybrid turbo (EQ Boost) I4 (China); 2.0 L M264 Mild Hybrid turbo I4; 3.0 L M256 Mild Hybrid turbo I6; Diesel: 2.0 L OM654 Mild Hybrid turbo I4; 2.9 L OM656 Mild Hybrid twin-turbo I6
- Transmission: 9-speed 9G-Tronic automatic
- Hybrid drivetrain: Mild Hybrid (EQ Boost)

Dimensions
- Wheelbase: 2,938 mm (115.7 in)
- Length: 4,988–5,001 mm (196.4–196.9 in)
- Width: 1,890 mm (74.4 in)
- Height: 1,435 mm (56.5 in)
- Kerb weight: 1,825–1,980 kg (4,020–4,370 lb)

Chronology
- Predecessor: Mercedes-Benz CLS-Class (C218)

The C257 Mercedes-Benz CLS is the third generation of the CLS range of four-door sedan, and was launched in 2018 as the successor to the Mercedes-Benz CLS (C218). It is only available as a sedan, with no plans to introduce a Shooting Brake variant in the near future. It is based heavily on the E-Class (W213).

== Development and launch ==
Information on the C257 CLS was released online on 29 November 2017, with a public unveiling at the Detroit Auto Show in January 2018.

The new CLS uses a four-link front suspension and a five-link rear suspension and comes in rear-wheel drive and all-wheel drive (4MATIC) configurations. CLS 53 4MATIC+ models utilise variable all-wheel drive, allowing for torque distribution between the front and rear axles. An electric motor is used to boost power output by 16 kW (21 hp) and 249 N⋅m (184 lb⋅ft), and also powers the on-board 48-volt system.

The CLS is also now a five-seater car, instead of being a four-seater as with the previous two generations.

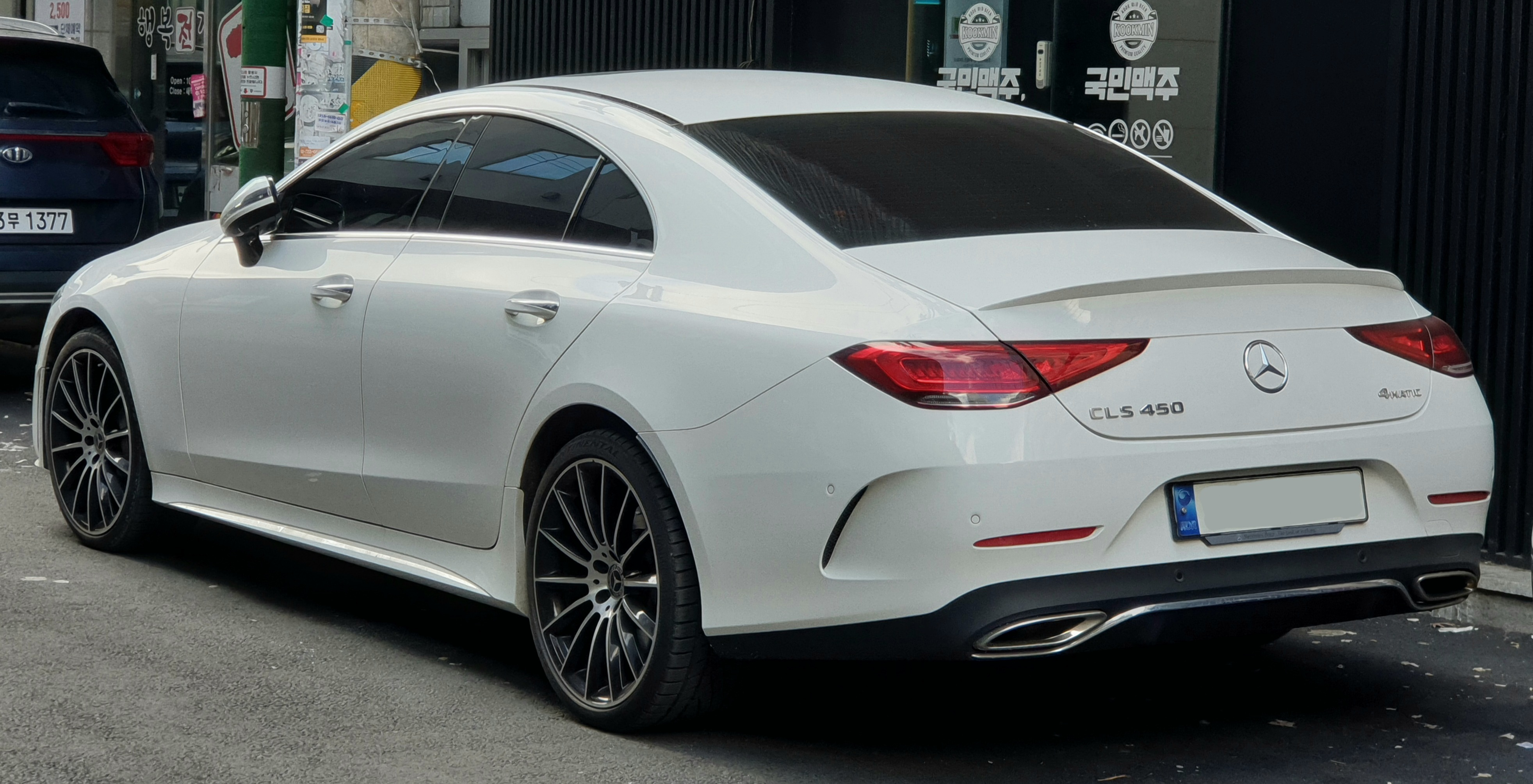
Rear view of a CLS 450 4Matic

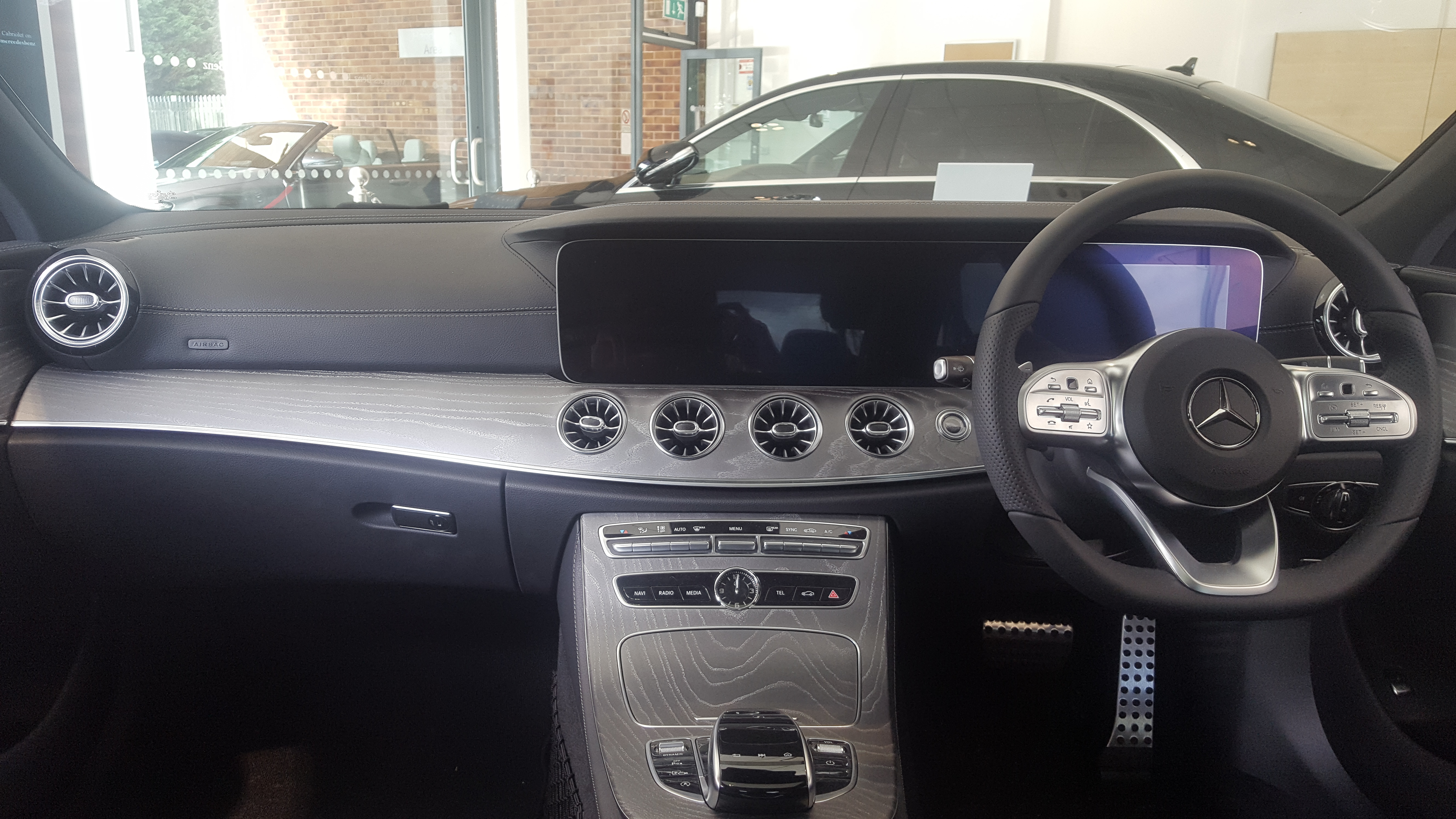
Interior of a CLS 350d 4Matic

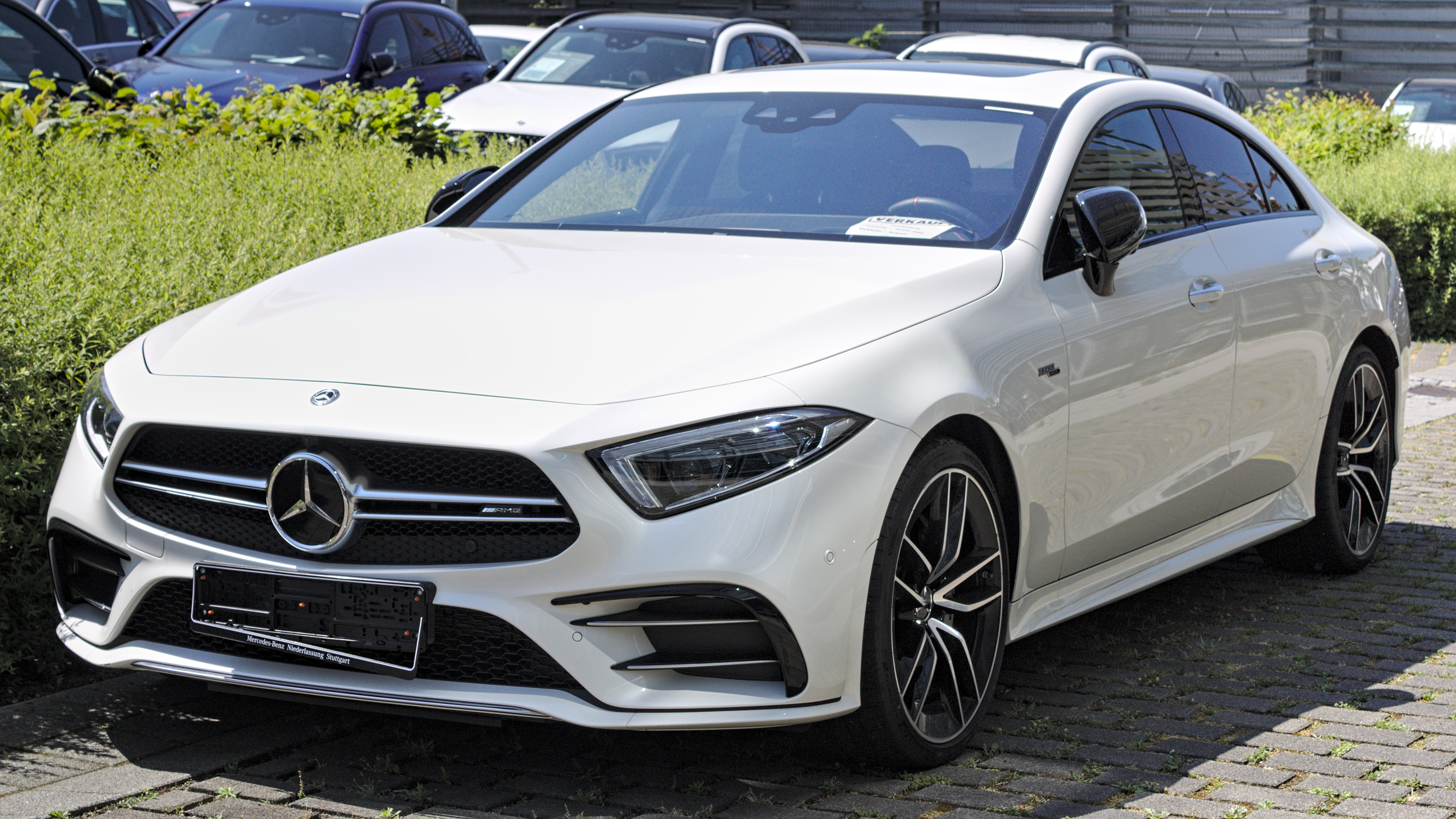
Mercedes-AMG CLS 53

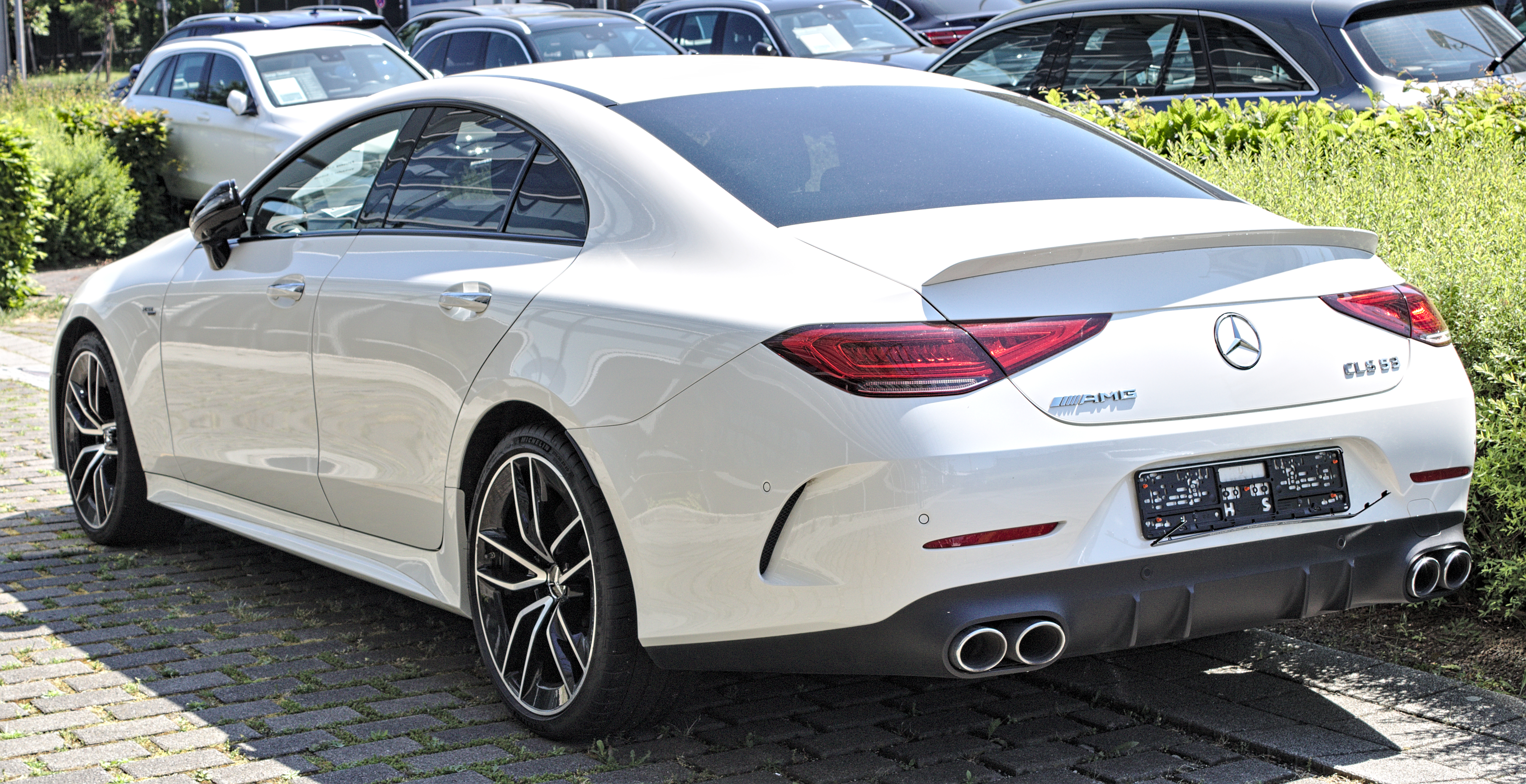
Mercedes-AMG CLS 53

== Equipment ==
Standard equipment includes LED headlights, 18-inch alloy wheels, ambient lighting, as well as lane keeping and speed limit assistance systems. CLS models also feature 'Mercedes me' online services with a built-in LTE module in the car, enabling concierge services and remote control of the car. Optional equipment includes air suspension and a widescreen cockpit consisting of two 12.3-inch displays on the dashboard. An AMG line is also available and includes AMG body styling, a diamond pattern radiator grille, 19-inch alloy wheels, and a flat-bottomed sports steering wheel.

== Models ==
=== Petrol engines ===
Model	Years	Engine	Power	Torque	0–100 km/h (0–62 mph)
CLS 260 (China)	2020-2023	M264 E15 DEH LA; 1.5 L I4 turbo + 48V Mild Hybrid	147 kW (197 hp; 200 PS)	280 N⋅m (207 lb⋅ft)	8.7 s
CLS 350	2018–2020	M264 DE20 LA; 2.0 L I4 turbo + ISG Mild Hybrid EQ Boost	220 kW (295 hp; 299 PS) at 5,800–6,100 rpm	400 N⋅m (295 lb⋅ft) at 3,000–4,000 rpm	6.0 s
CLS 450 4MATIC	2018–2023	M256 E30; 3.0 L I6 turbo + ISG Mild Hybrid EQ Boost	270 kW (362 hp; 367 PS) at 5,500–6,100 rpm	500 N⋅m (369 lb⋅ft) at 1,600–4,000 rpm	4.8 s
AMG CLS 53 4MATIC+	2018–2023	M256 E30; 3.0 L I6 turbo + ISG Mild Hybrid EQ Boost	320 kW (429 hp; 435 PS) at 6,100 rpm	520 N⋅m (384 lb⋅ft) at 1,800–5,800 rpm	4.5 s

=== Diesel engines ===
Model	Years	Engine	Power	Torque	0–100 km/h (0–62 mph)
CLS 220d	2019–2023	OM654 DE20 SCR; 2.0 L I4 turbo + ISG Mild Hybrid EQ Boost	154 kW (207 hp; 209 PS) at 3,800 rpm	400 N⋅m (295 lb⋅ft) at 1,600-2,800 rpm	7.5 s
CLS 300d	2018–2020	OM654 DE20 SCR; 2.0 L I4 turbo + ISG Mild Hybrid EQ Boost	180 kW (241 hp; 245 PS) at 4,200 rpm	500 N⋅m (369 lb⋅ft) at 1,600-2,400 rpm	6.4 s
CLS 300d 4MATIC	2021–2023	OM654 DE20 SCR; 2.0 L I4 turbo + ISG Mild Hybrid EQ Boost	195 kW (261 hp; 265 PS) at 4,200 rpm	550 N⋅m (406 lb⋅ft) at 1,800–2,200 rpm	6.4 s
CLS 350d 4MATIC	2018–2020	OM656 D29 SCR; 2.9 L I6 twin-turbo + ISG Mild Hybrid EQ Boost	210 kW (282 hp; 286 PS) at 3,400–4,600 rpm	600 N⋅m (443 lb⋅ft) at 1,200–3,200 rpm	5.7 s
CLS 400d 4MATIC	2018–2020	OM656 D29 SCR; 2.9 L I6 twin-turbo + ISG Mild Hybrid EQ Boost	250 kW (335 hp; 340 PS) at 3,600–4,400 rpm	700 N⋅m (516 lb⋅ft) at 1,200–3,200 rpm	5.0 s
CLS 400d 4MATIC	2020-2023	OM656 D29 SCR; 2.9 L I6 twin-turbo + ISG Mild Hybrid EQ Boost	243 kW (326 hp; 330 PS) at 3,600–4,200 rpm	700 N⋅m (516 lb⋅ft) at 1,200–3,200 rpm	5.2 s
