= Mercedes-Benz M256 engine =

Mercedes-Benz M256
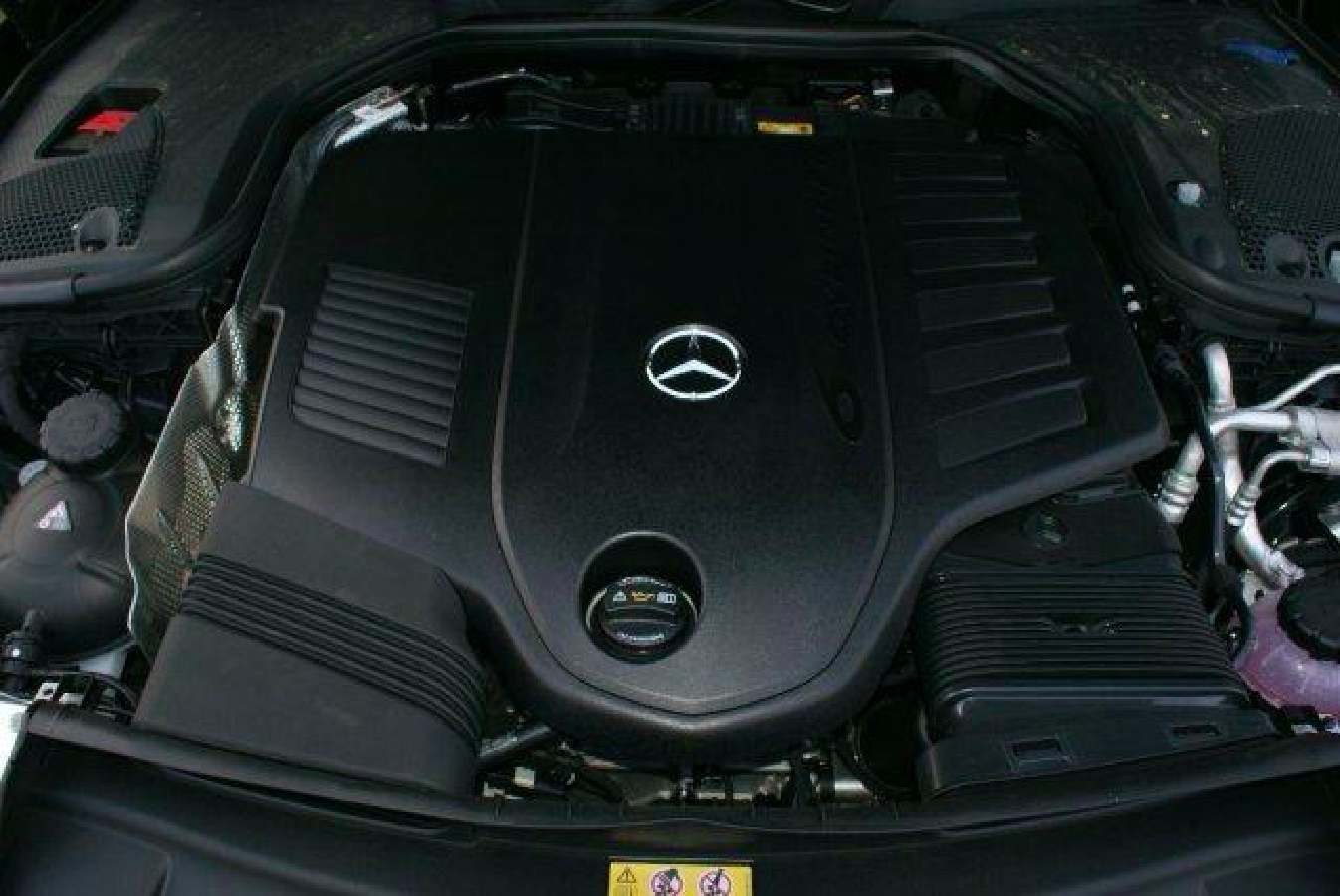

Overview
- Manufacturer: Mercedes-Benz
- Production: 2017–present

Layout
- Configuration: Straight-six
- Displacement: 2.5 L (2,498 cc); 3.0 L (2,999 cc)
- Cylinder bore: 83 mm (3.27 in)
- Piston stroke: 77 mm (3.03 in); 92.4 mm (3.64 in)
- Cylinder block material: Aluminium alloy
- Cylinder head material: Aluminium alloy
- Valvetrain: DOHC 4 valves x cyl
- Compression ratio: 10.5:1

Combustion
- Supercharger: BorgWarner eBooster
- Turbocharger: Single-turbo twin-scroll
- Fuel system: Direct injection
- Fuel type: Petrol
- Oil system: Dry sump. Oil supplied by Petronas
- Cooling system: Water cooled

Output
- Power output: 230–320 kW (313–435 PS)
- Torque output: 450–560 N⋅m (332–413 lb⋅ft)

Chronology
- Predecessor: Mercedes-Benz M276

The Mercedes-Benz M256 engine is a turbocharged straight-six engine produced since 2017, when it was first introduced on the W222 S 450. It replaces the previous M276 V6 engine, and is Mercedes' first petrol-powered straight-six engine since the M104 engine.

== Design ==
The M256 shares a modular design with other inline-four and V8 engines, which are all 500 cc (31 cu in) per cylinder. It uses an aluminium alloy block with dual overhead camshafts and has 4 valves per cylinder. The M256 uses a 48V electrical system to operate a BorgWarner electric supercharger, which can spin up to 70,000 rpm to reduce turbo lag. In the S 500's G variant engine, an integrated starter alternator also provides up to 16 kW (22 PS) and 250 N⋅m (184 lb⋅ft) of boost, and replaces the drive belts by managing the water pump and air conditioning; allowing for a smaller and lighter engine.

== Models ==
Engine output excluding the additional 48V system boost:

Engine	Power	Torque	Years
M256 E25; DEH LA GR	230 kW (313 PS; 308 hp) - 270 kW (367 PS; 362 hp) at 5,500–6,100 rpm	450 N⋅m (332 lb⋅ft) at 1,600–4,000 rpm	2021–
M256 E30; DEH LA GR	270–280 kW (367–381 PS; 362–375 hp) at 5,500–6,100 rpm	500–560 N⋅m (369–413 lb⋅ft) at 1,600–4,000 rpm	2017–
M256 E30; DEH LA G	320 kW (435 PS; 429 hp) at 5,900–6,100 rpm	520 N⋅m (384 lb⋅ft) at 1,800–5,500 rpm	2017–

=== M256 E25 DEH LA GR ===
- 2021-present S 400 L/S 450 L (China only)
- 2021-present GLE 450/GLS 450 (China only)

=== M256 E30 DEH LA GR ===
- 2017–2020 W222 S 450 / S 450 4MATIC (European models only)

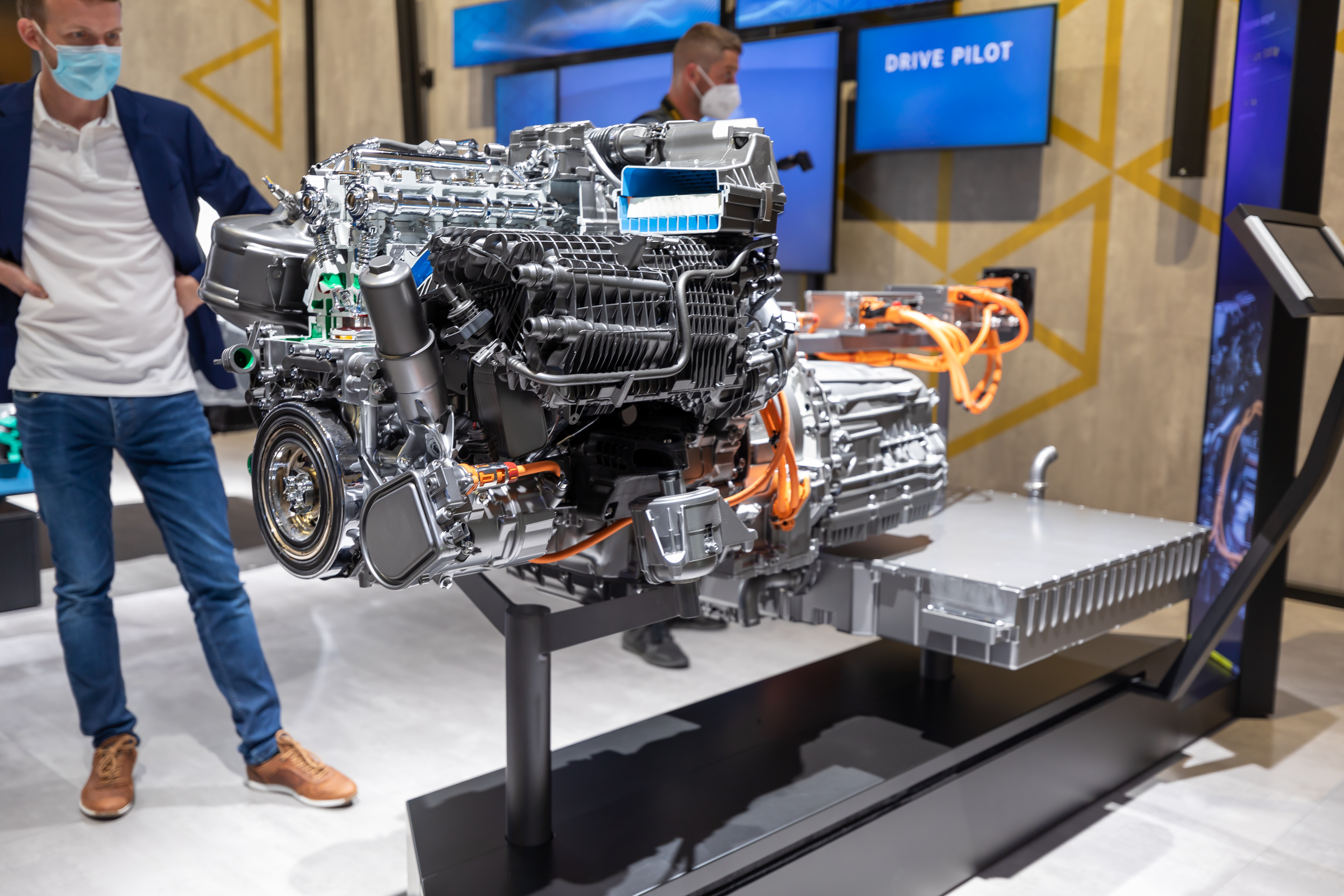
Partial cutaway of an M256 engine

2018–2023 C257 CLS 450 / CLS 450 4MATIC

- 2019–present X290 AMG GT 43 / GT 43 4MATIC+
- 2019–present X290 AMG GT 50 / GT 50 4MATIC+ (China only)
- 2019–present V167 GLE 450 4MATIC
- 2019–present X167 GLS 450 4MATIC
- 2019–present Austro Daimler Bergmeister PHEV
- 2020–present W213 E 450 4MATIC
- 2023–present W214 E 450 4MATIC
- 2021–present W223 S 450 4MATIC
- 2021–present W223 S 580 e 4MATIC

=== M256 E30 DEH LA G ===
- 2017–2020 W222 S 500
- 2018–2023 W213 E 53 4MATIC+
- 2018–2023 C257 CLS 53 4MATIC+
- 2018–present X290 AMG GT 53 4MATIC+
- 2020–present V167 GLE 53 4MATIC
- 2021–present W223 S 500 4MATIC
- 2021–present Aston Martin DBX Straight-Six
- 2024–present CLE 53 AMG
