= Mercedes-AMG GT 4-Door Coupé =

Executive car

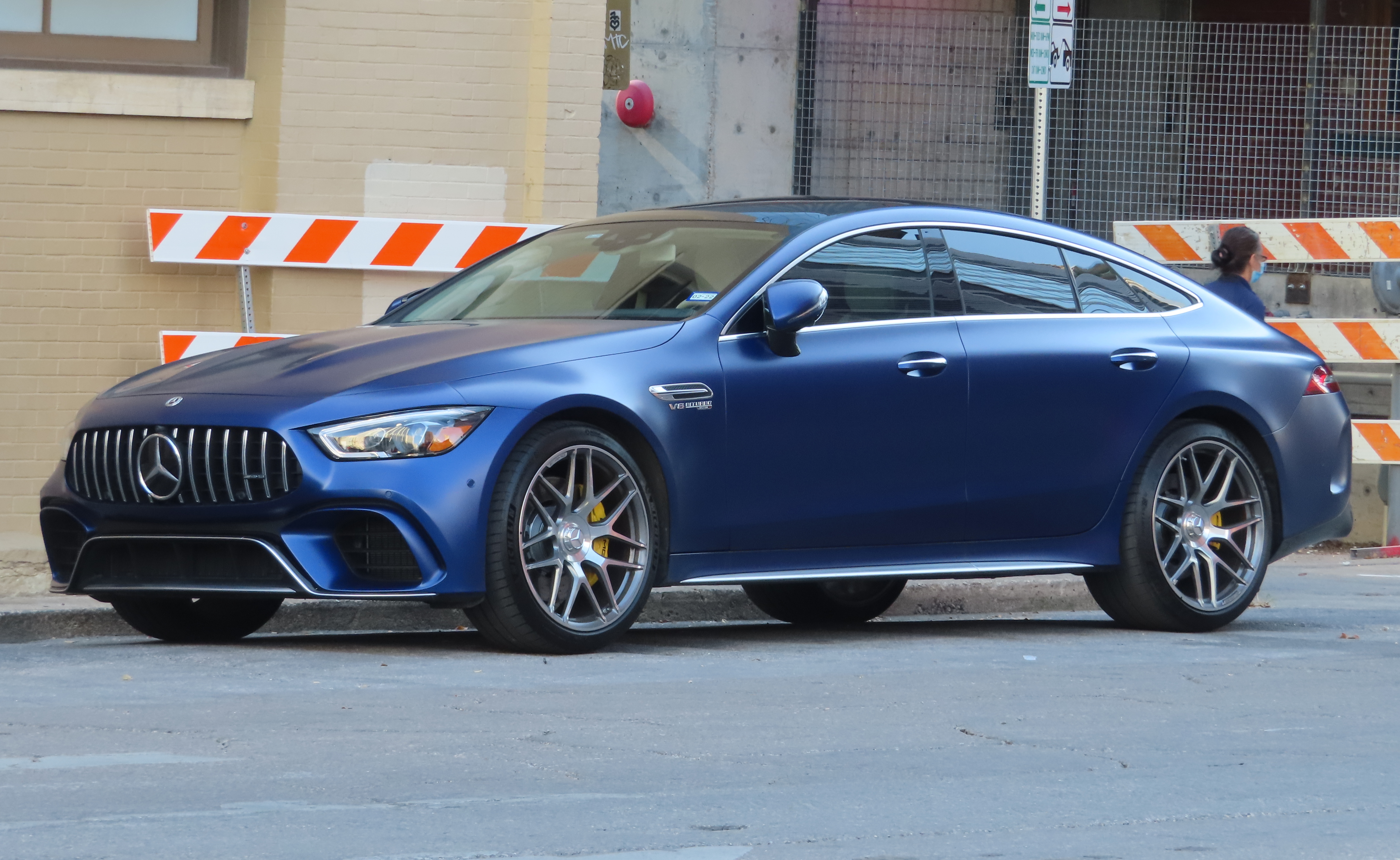
- Mercedes-AMG GT 63 S (X290)

Overview
- Manufacturer: Mercedes-AMG
- Production: September 2018 – present
- Model years: 2019–present

Body and chassis
- Class: Executive car (E)
- Body style: 5-door liftback
- Layout: Front-engine, rear-wheel-drive (2018–2026); Front-engine, all-wheel-drive (2018–2026); Dual/tri-motor, all-wheel-drive (2026–present)

The Mercedes-AMG GT 4-Door Coupé is an executive car (E-segment) introduced in 2018 by Mercedes-AMG. It is marketed as a five-door variant of the AMG GT two-door sports car. Despite the name and style, the GT 4-Door Coupé is closely related to the AMG E 63 with its performance chassis, and is featured by the AMG-specific rear frame and a different front axle for better kinematics.

== First generation (X290; 2018) ==
First generation
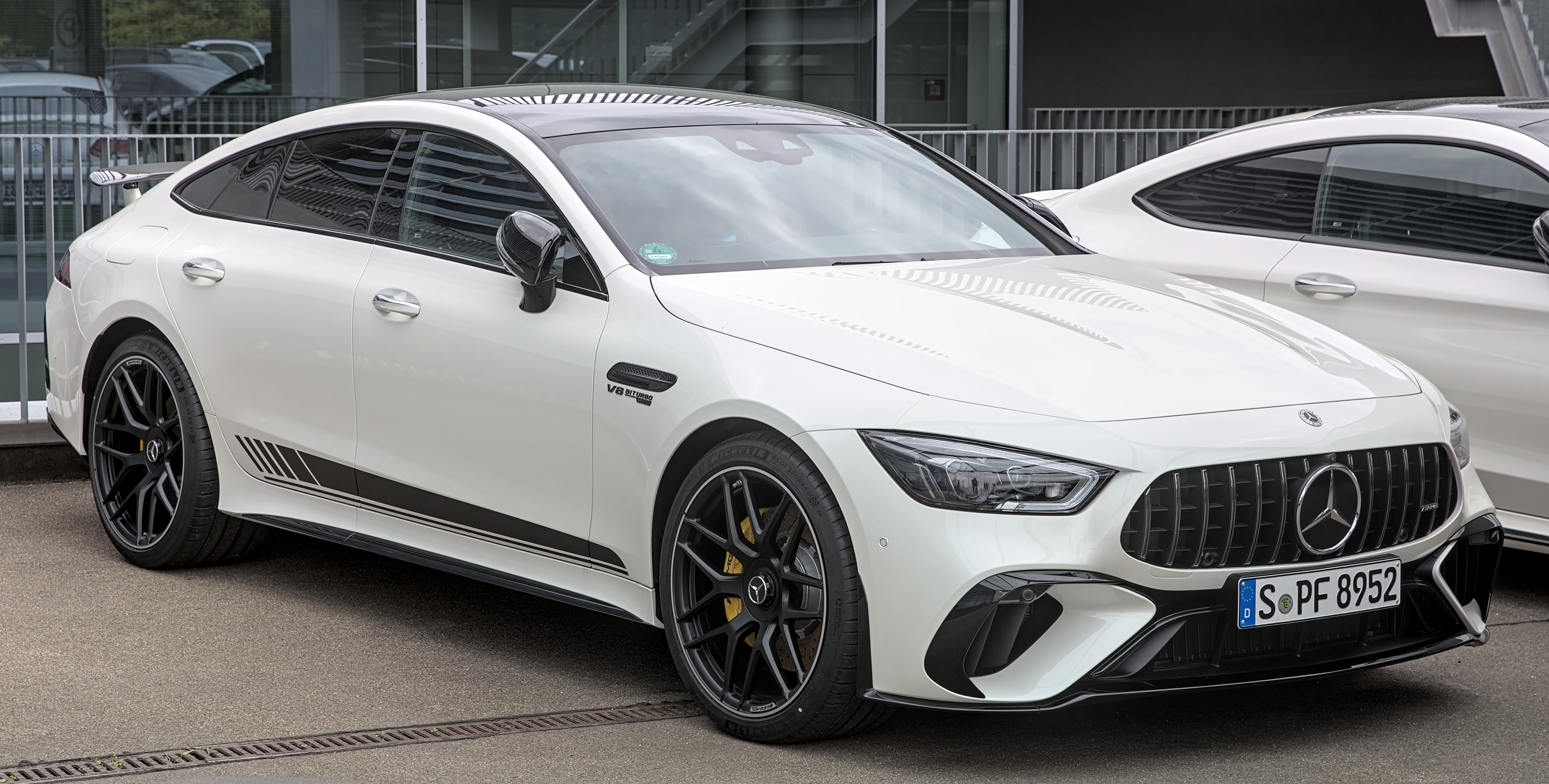
- 2023 Mercedes-AMG GT 63 S

Overview
- Model code: X290
- Production: September 2018– November 2025
- Model years: 2019–2026
- Assembly: Germany: Sindelfingen (2018–2023); Finland: Uusikaupunki (Valmet Automotive) (2023–2025)
- Designer: Balázs Filczer

Body and chassis
- Layout: Front-engine, rear-wheel-drive/all-wheel-drive (4Matic)
- Platform: MRA
- Related: Mercedes-Benz E-Class (W213); Mercedes-Benz CLS-Class (C257)

Powertrain
- Engine: Petrol: 3.0 L M256 turbo I6 (43/50/53); 4.0 L M177 biturbo V8 (63/63 S); 4.0 L M177 biturbo plug-in hybrid V8 (63 S E-Performance)
- Electric motor: 150 kW (201 hp) synchronous electric motor (63 S E Performance)
- Transmission: 9-speed 9G-TRONIC automatic AMG SPEEDSHIFT MCT 9-speed automatic
- Hybrid drivetrain: Plug-in (63 S E-Performance)
- Battery: AMG 400-volt High Performance Battery, 4.8 kWh

Dimensions
- Wheelbase: 2,951 mm (116.2 in)
- Length: 5,054 mm (199.0 in)
- Width: 1,953 mm (76.9 in)
- Height: 1,442–1,455 mm (56.8–57.3 in)
- Curb weight: 1,970–2,380 kg (4,343.1–5,247.0 lb)

The design of the GT 4-Door Coupé was mainly influenced by the Mercedes-Benz AMG GT Concept introduced a few years before series production. The AMG GT 4-Door Coupé uses a front-engine layout with rear-wheel-drive or 4MATIC+ fully variable all-wheel-drive (rear-biased), and is available with either a 3.0 L M256 turbo/supercharged inline-six engine or a 4.0 L M177 twin-turbocharged V8 engine. The inline-six engine features a conventional turbocharger as well as a mild hybrid system that Mercedes-Benz calls "EQ Boost", which uses an electrically driven supercharger and a 48 volt electric motor that when combined, produce an extra 21 hp (16 kW) and 184 lb⋅ft (249 N⋅m) of torque in addition to the petrol engine when it is not powering the electrical system. This system traces its roots back to the Mercedes CLS 53. The car utilizes the rear anti-roll bar to increase chassis stiffness, as well as active aero, including an electronically adjustable rear spoiler and electronically operated front louvers in the front grille, that can open and close to manage airflow through the radiator from the AMG GT R flagship sports car.

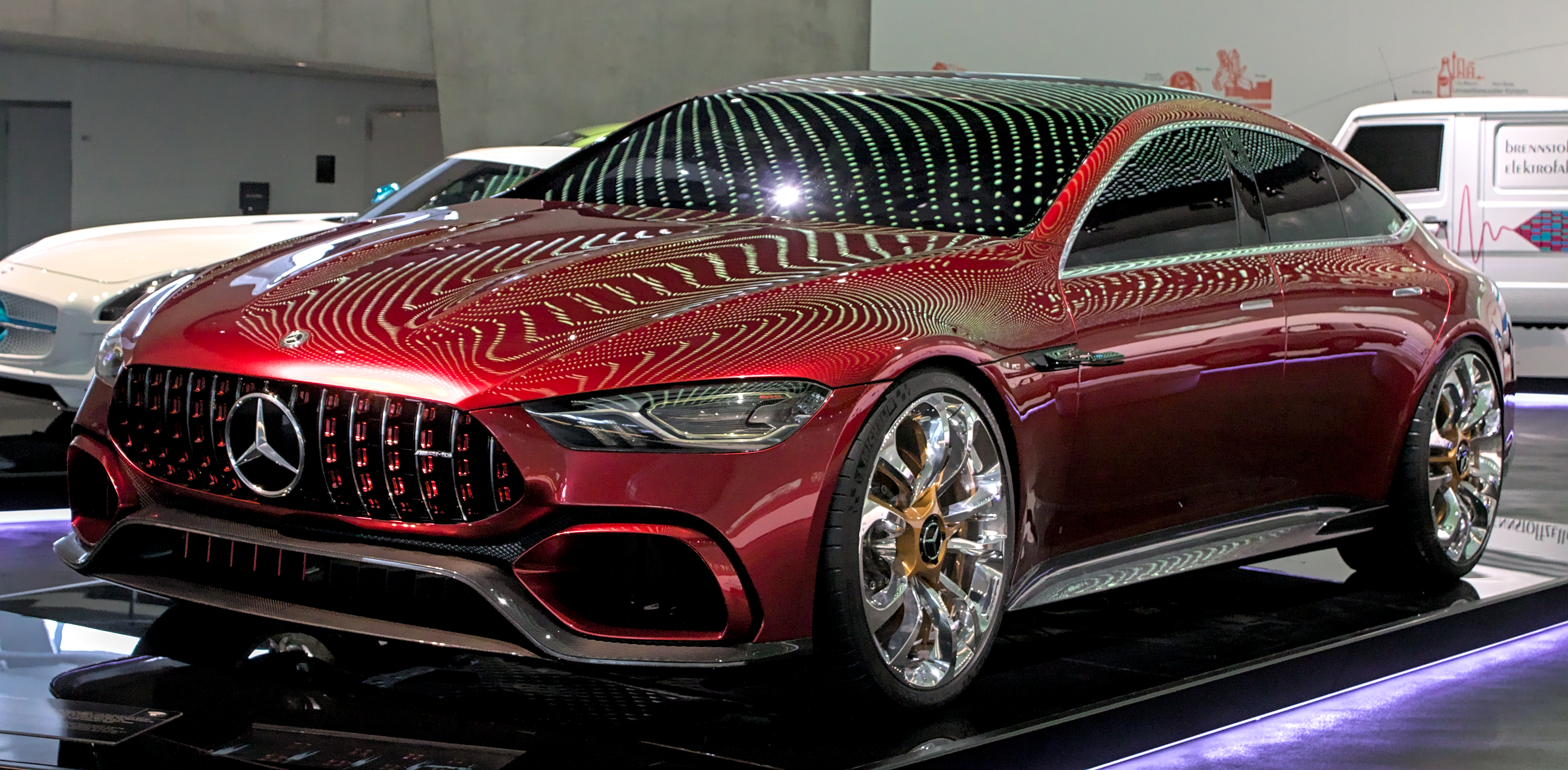
Mercedes-AMG GT Concept

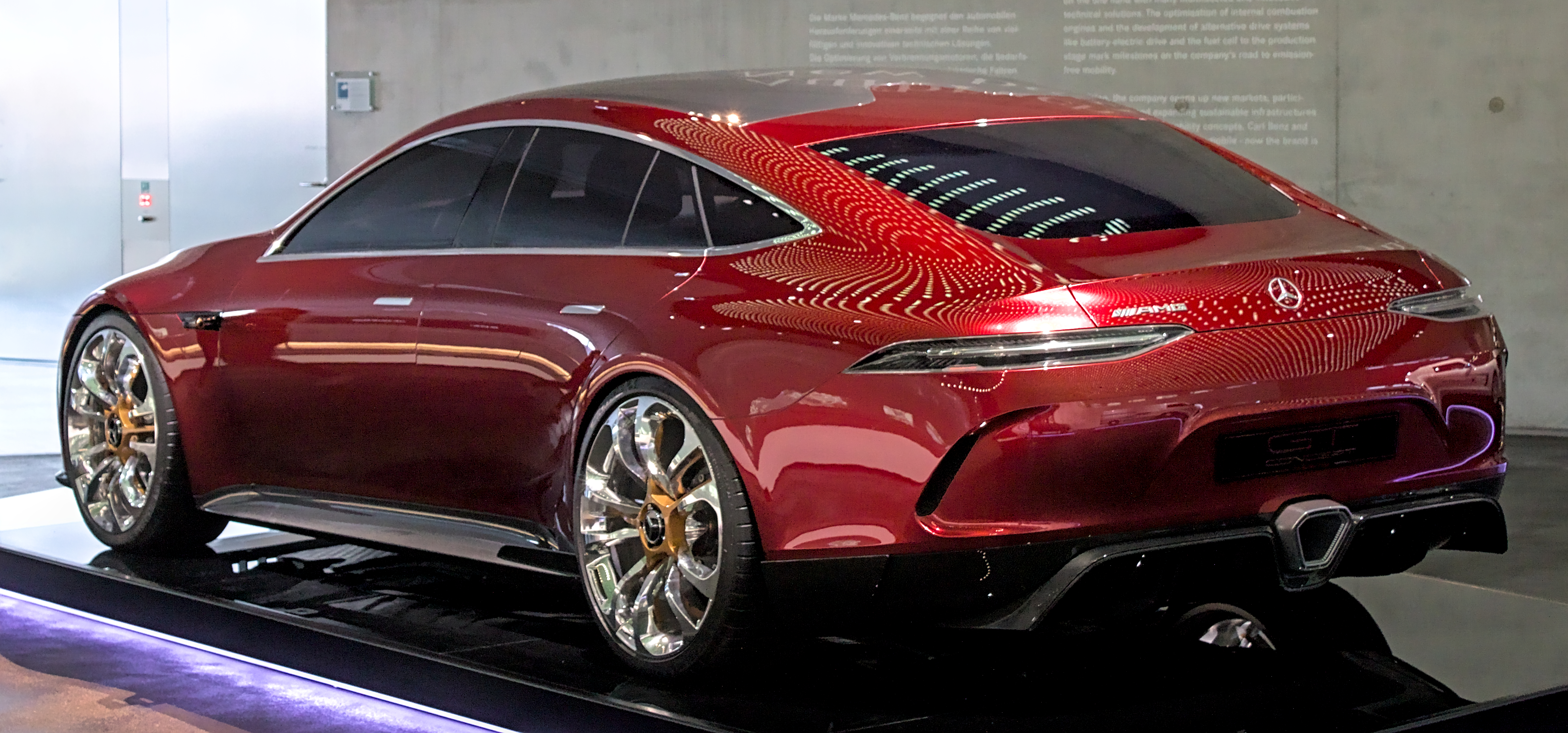
Rear view (Concept)

=== Variants ===
==== Mercedes-AMG GT 43 & GT 50 ====
The GT 43 and the GT 50 are the entry-level variants of the AMG GT 4-Door Coupé and both feature the same M256 3.0L Twincharged inline-six and the 4MATIC+ AWD system. The engine produces 270 kW (362 hp; 367 PS) and 500 N⋅m (369 lbf⋅ft) of torque and the EQ Boost starter-alternator delivers additional short-term output and torque of 16 kW (21 hp) and 250 N⋅m (184 lbf⋅ft), respectively. It can accelerate from 0–100 km/h (0–62 mph) in 4.9 seconds, with a claimed top speed of 270 km/h (168 mph). The GT43 and GT50 are the same car (GT43 is the worldwide version, GT50 is the China only version).

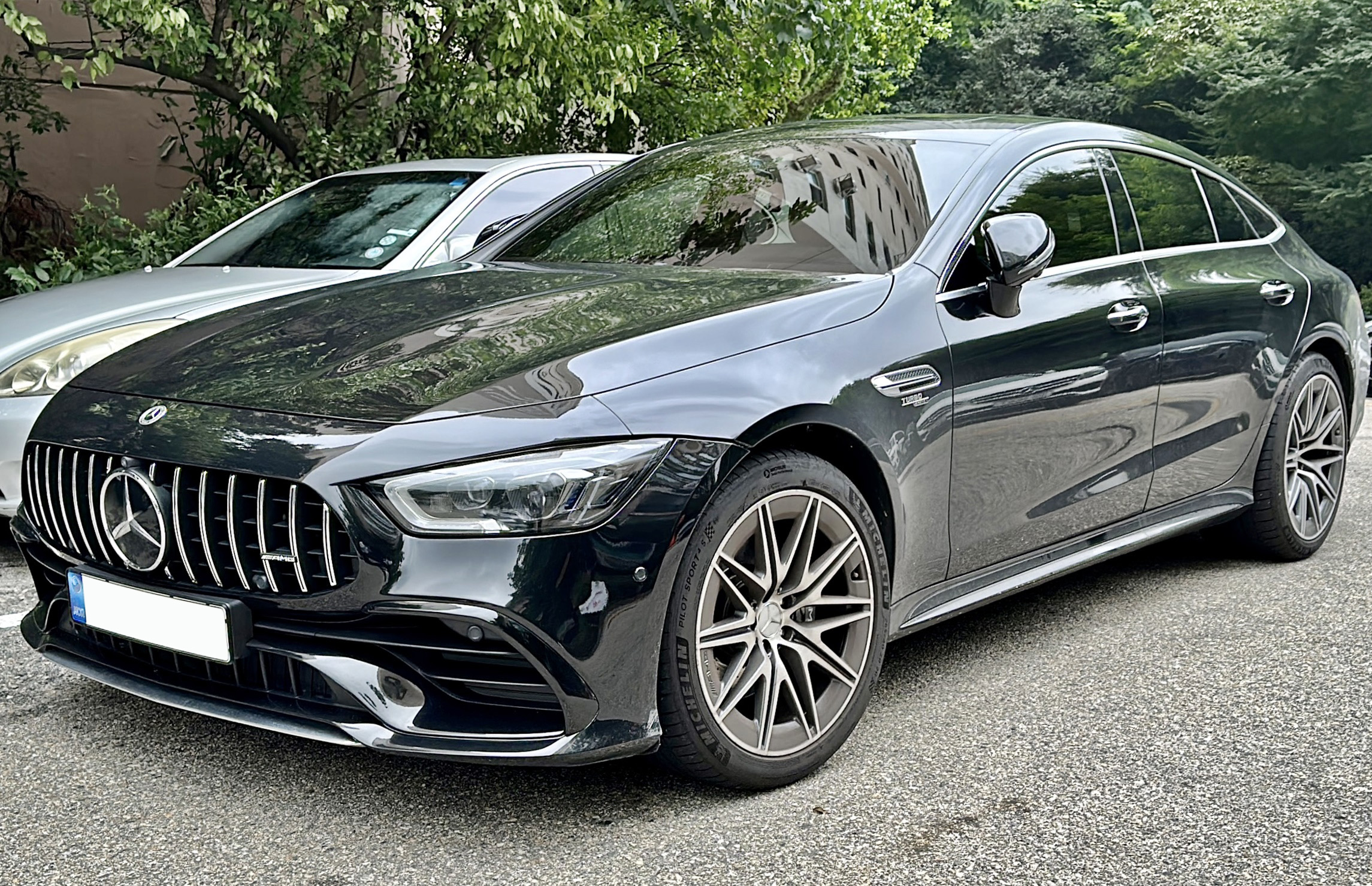
Mercedes-AMG GT 43

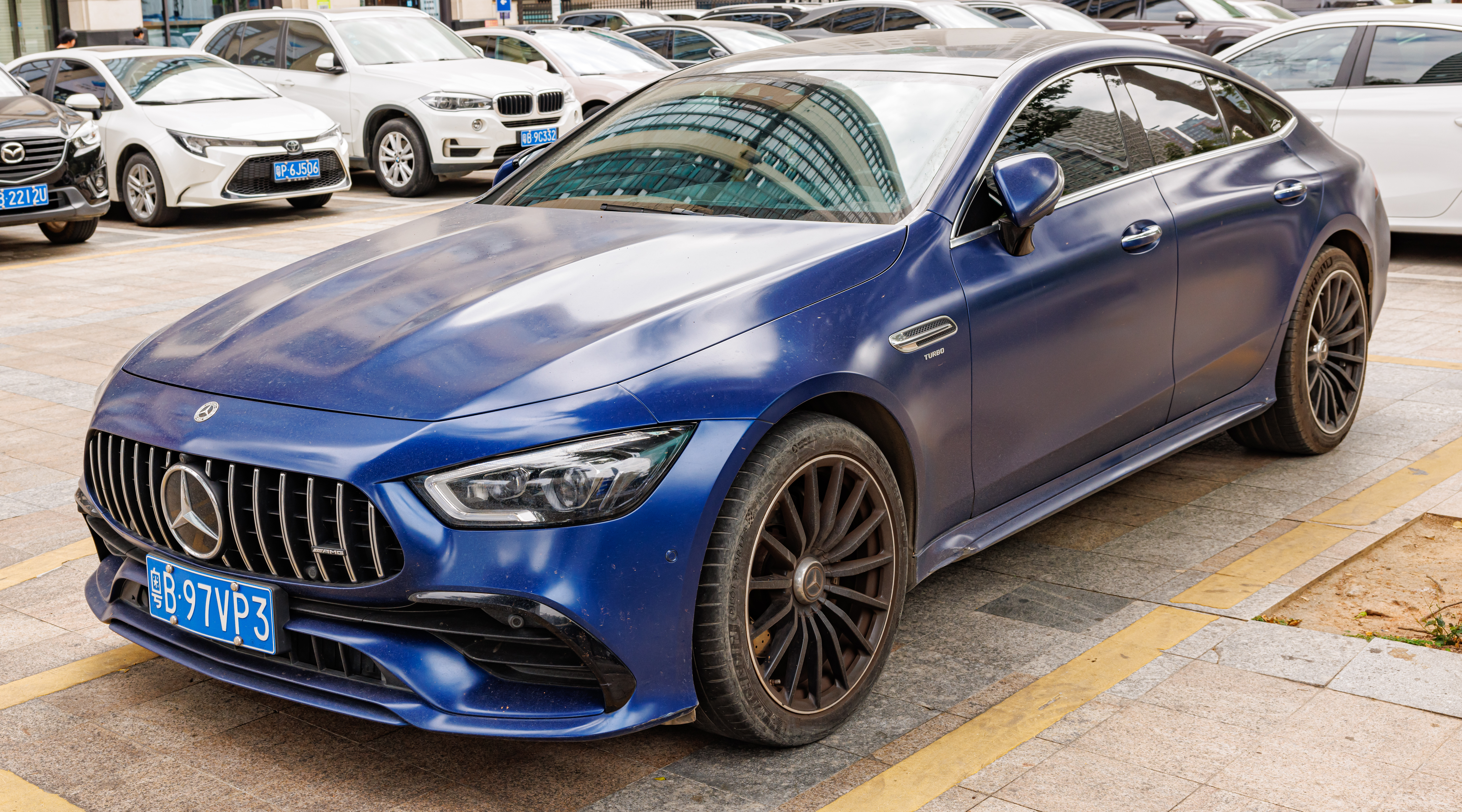
Mercedes-AMG GT 50

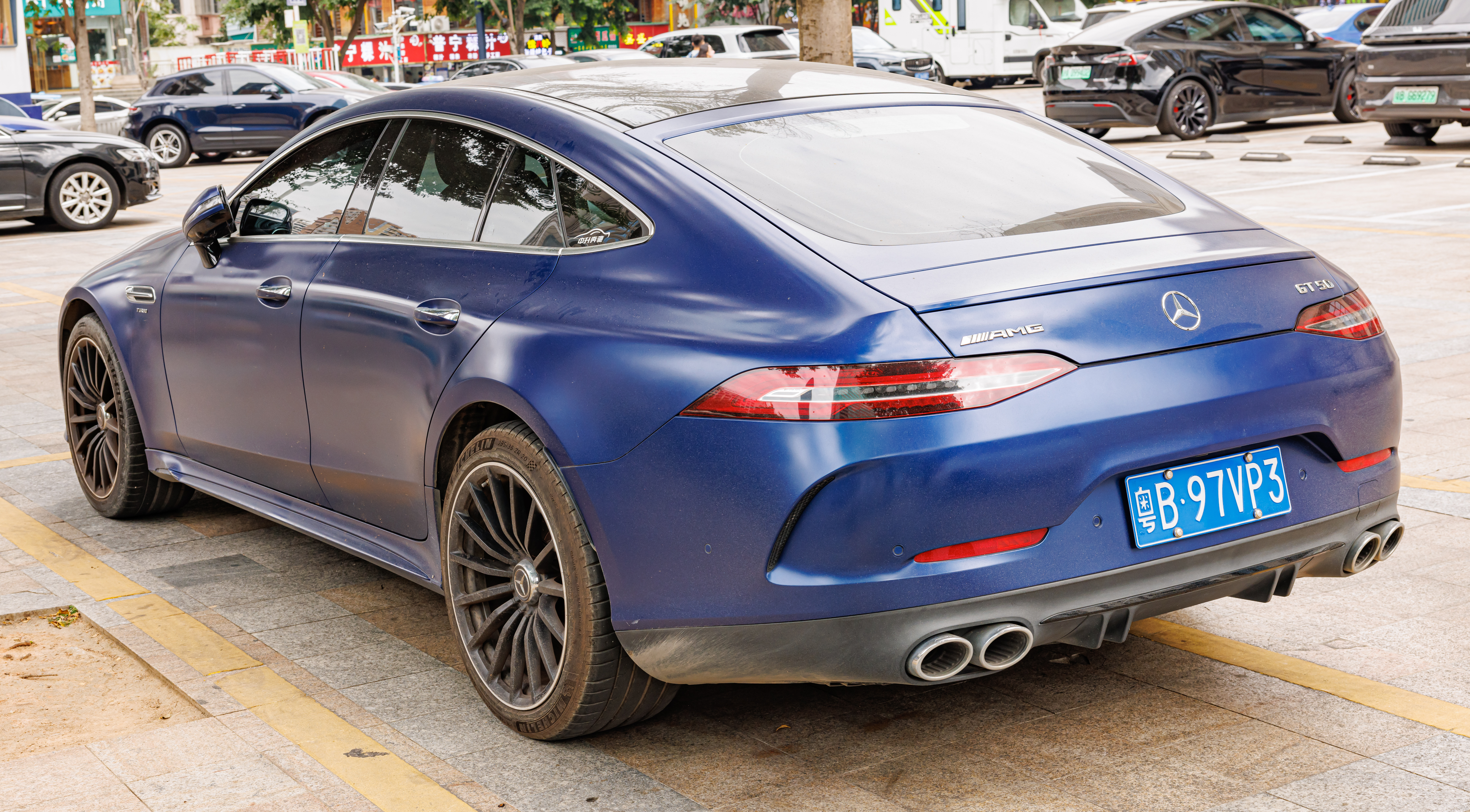
Rear view (GT 50)

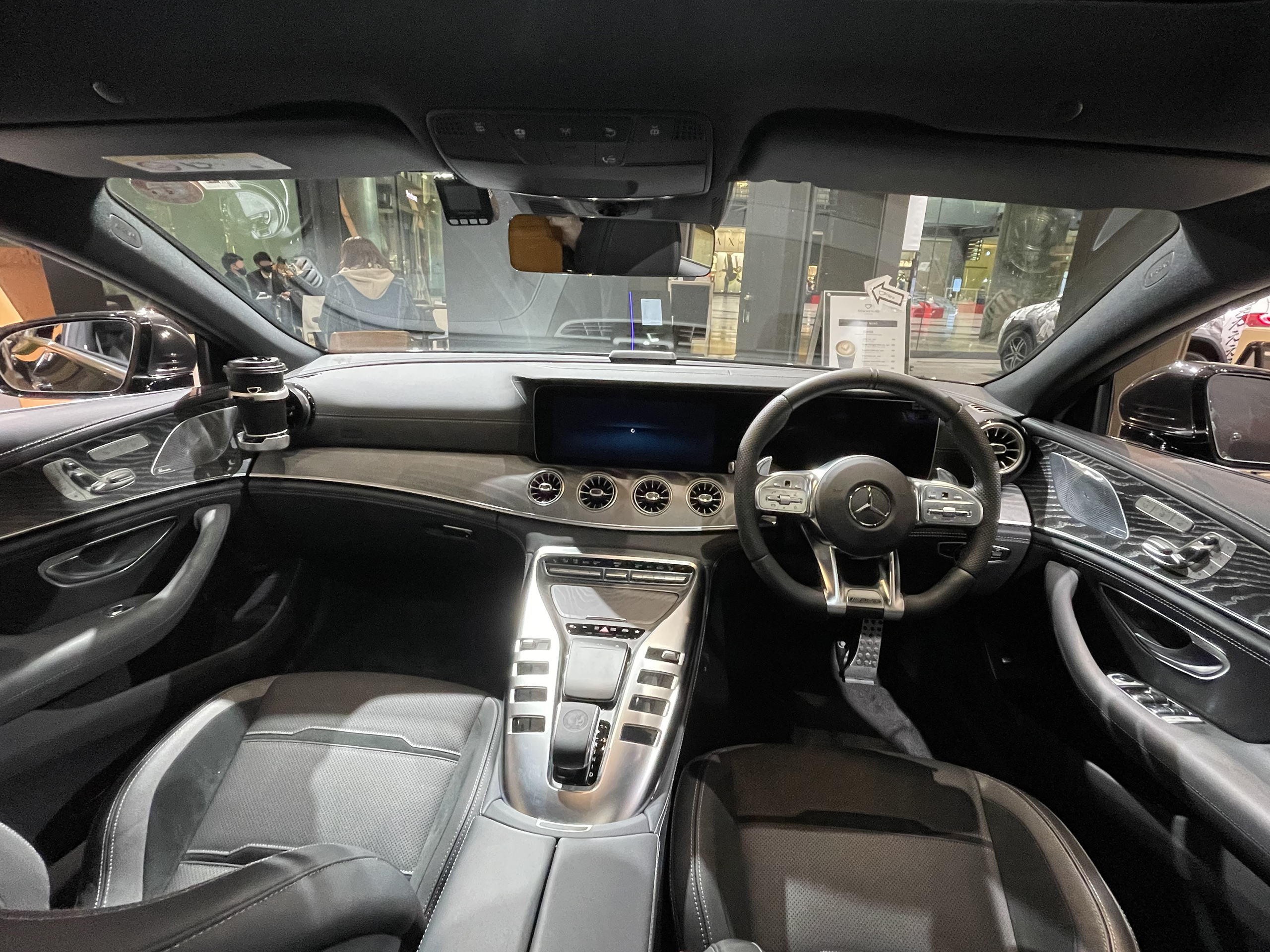
Interior (GT 43)

==== Mercedes-AMG GT 53 ====
The GT 53 is the more powerful version of the GT 43. It features the same 3.0L turbo/supercharged inline-six, but with higher outputs. The engine produces 320 kW (429 hp; 435 PS) and 520 N⋅m (384 lbf⋅ft) of torque. The starter-generator and electrically driven supercharger called EQ boost supplements the engine temporarily with 16 kW (21 hp) and 250 N⋅m (184 lbf⋅ft) of torque while under full acceleration. It can accelerate from 0–100 km/h (0–62 mph) in 4.5 seconds, along with attaining a top speed of 285 km/h (177 mph) as tested by the manufacturer. The suspension uses steel springs and adaptive dampers and the gearbox is a 9-speed unit that uses a conventional torque converter. The GT53 can be optioned with the more aggressive "Aero Package". This package includes a more pronounced front splitter, with larger air vents to allow for more efficient cooling, combined with a deeper and larger rear diffusor and both fixed or movable (electronically) rear wing.

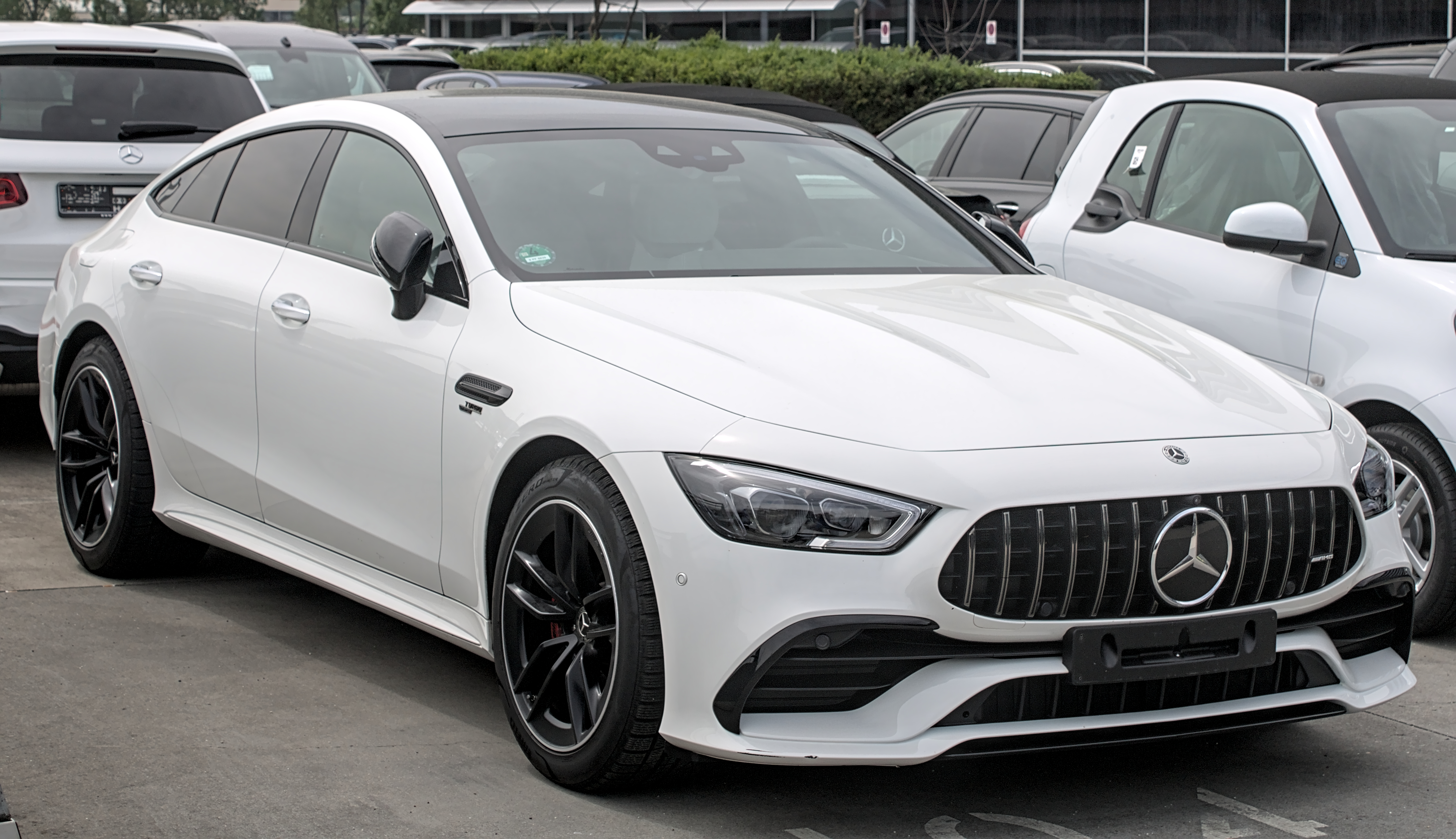
Mercedes-AMG GT 53

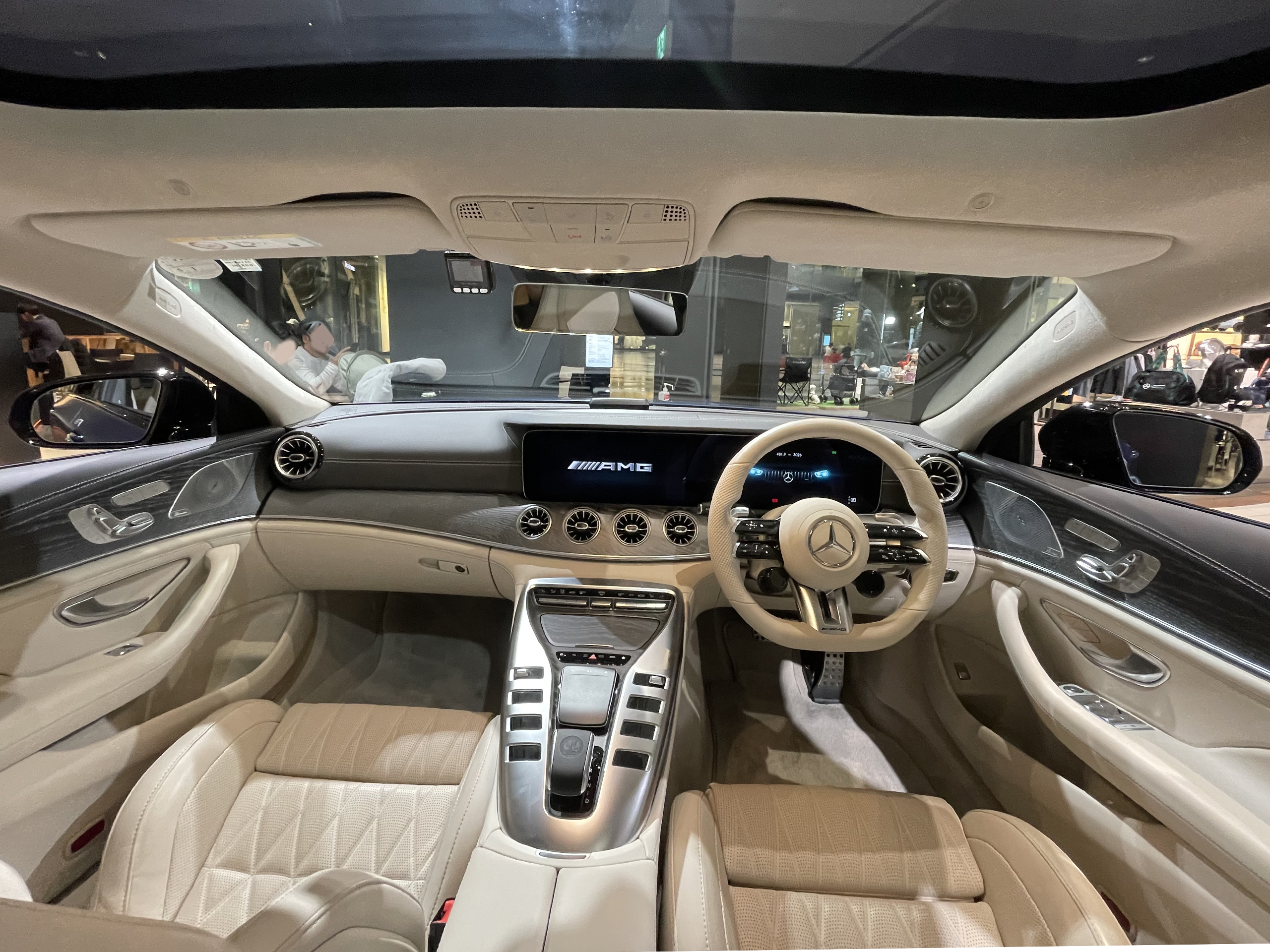
Interior (GT 53)

==== Mercedes-AMG GT 63 ====
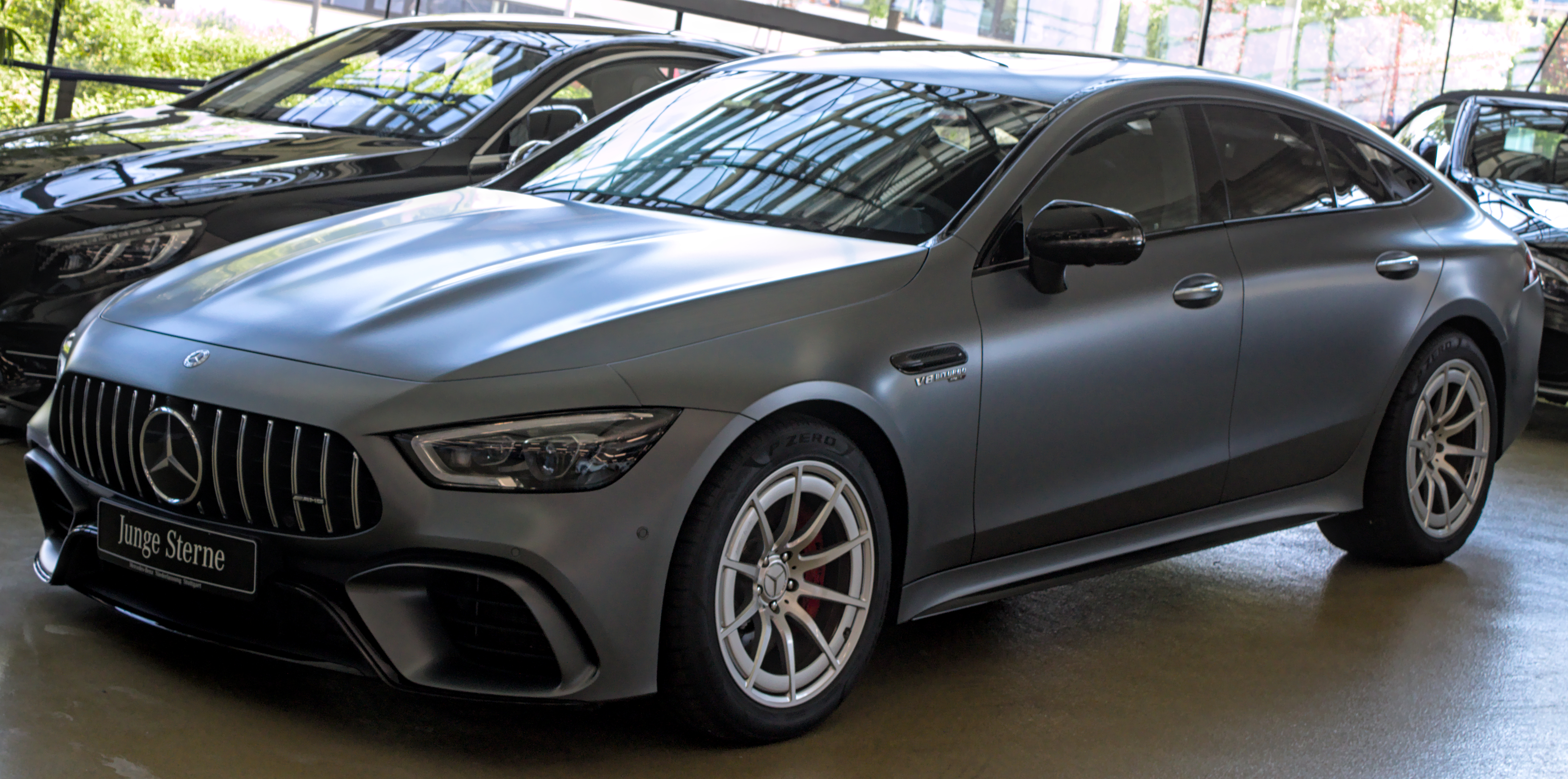
Mercedes-AMG GT 63

The GT 63 is a high performance, better equipped variant of the GT 4-Door and features the AMG M177 4.0L twin-turbocharged V8 engine, which produces 430 kW (577 hp; 585 PS) and 800 N⋅m (590 lbf⋅ft). It has a claimed 0–62 mph (0–100 km/h) acceleration time of 3.4 seconds and a top speed of 311 km/h (193 mph) as tested by the manufacturer. The GT 63 also has an optional selectable "Drift Mode" which directs power solely to the rear wheels. The car comes standard with an electronically controlled limited-slip rear differential and rear-wheel steering, and features an MCT gearbox with a wet clutch to handle the extra power. The GT 63 uses AMG's multi-chamber air suspension for a sportier, more adaptive ride and has cylinder deactivation mode for increased efficiency.

==== Mercedes-AMG GT 63 S ====
The GT 63 S features the same 4.0L M177 twin-turbocharged V8 engine as in the GT 63, but receives further tuning to produce 470 kW (630 hp; 639 PS) and 900 N⋅m (664 lbf⋅ft) of torque. The GT 63S will reportedly accelerate from 0–100 km/h (0–62 mph) in 3.2 seconds and attain a top speed of 315 km/h (196 mph) as tested by the manufacturer. Auto Bild tested 0–100 km/h (0–62 mph) in 3.0 seconds, 0–160 km/h (0–99 mph) in 6.6 seconds and 0–200 km/h (0–124 mph) in 10.2 seconds.

Additionally, all of the equipment and features from the GT 63, as well as the selectable "Drift Mode", which directs power solely to the rear wheels, comes as standard on the GT 63 S as well.

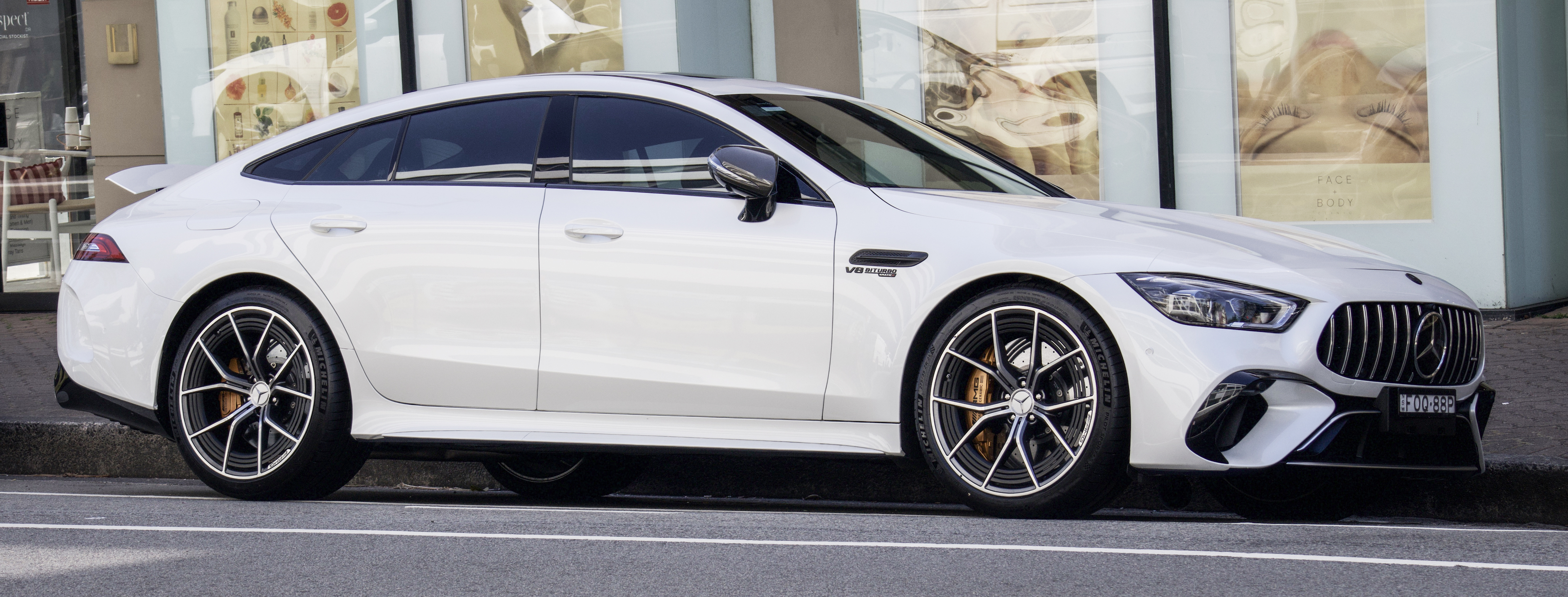
Mercedes-AMG GT 63 S

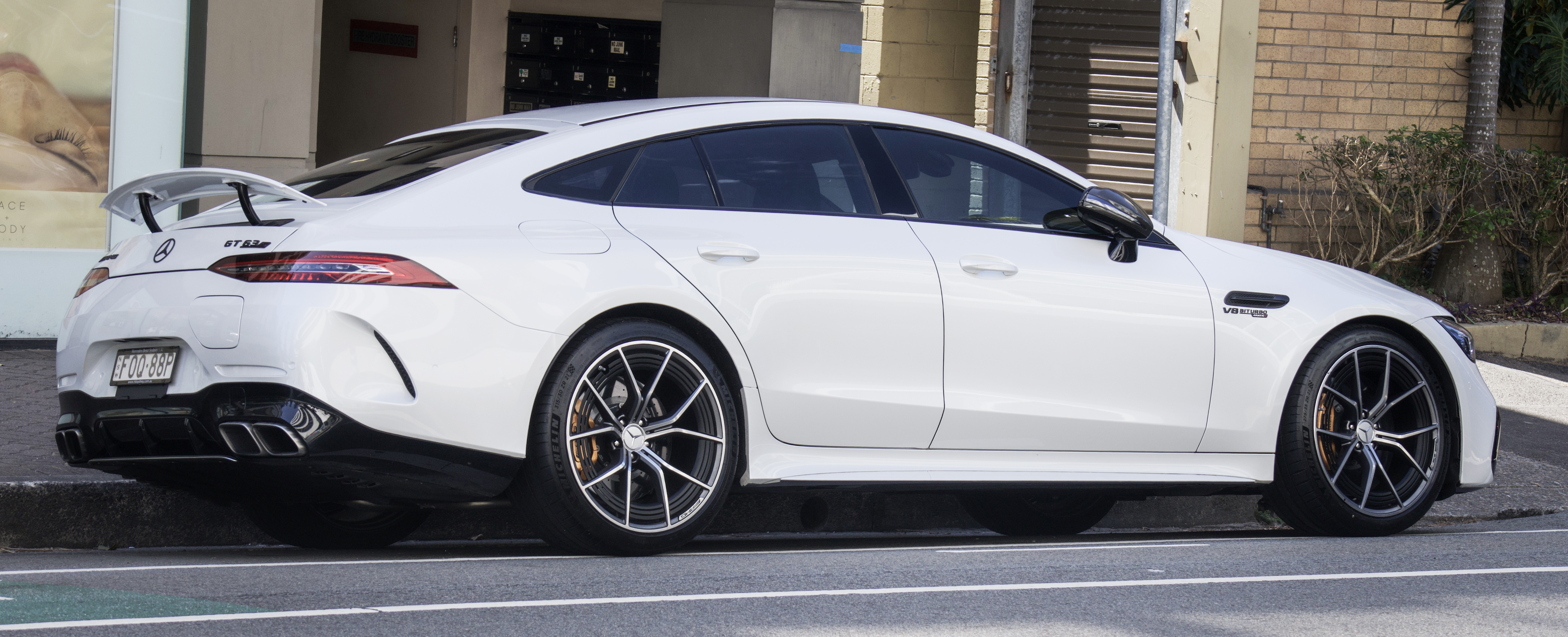
Rear view

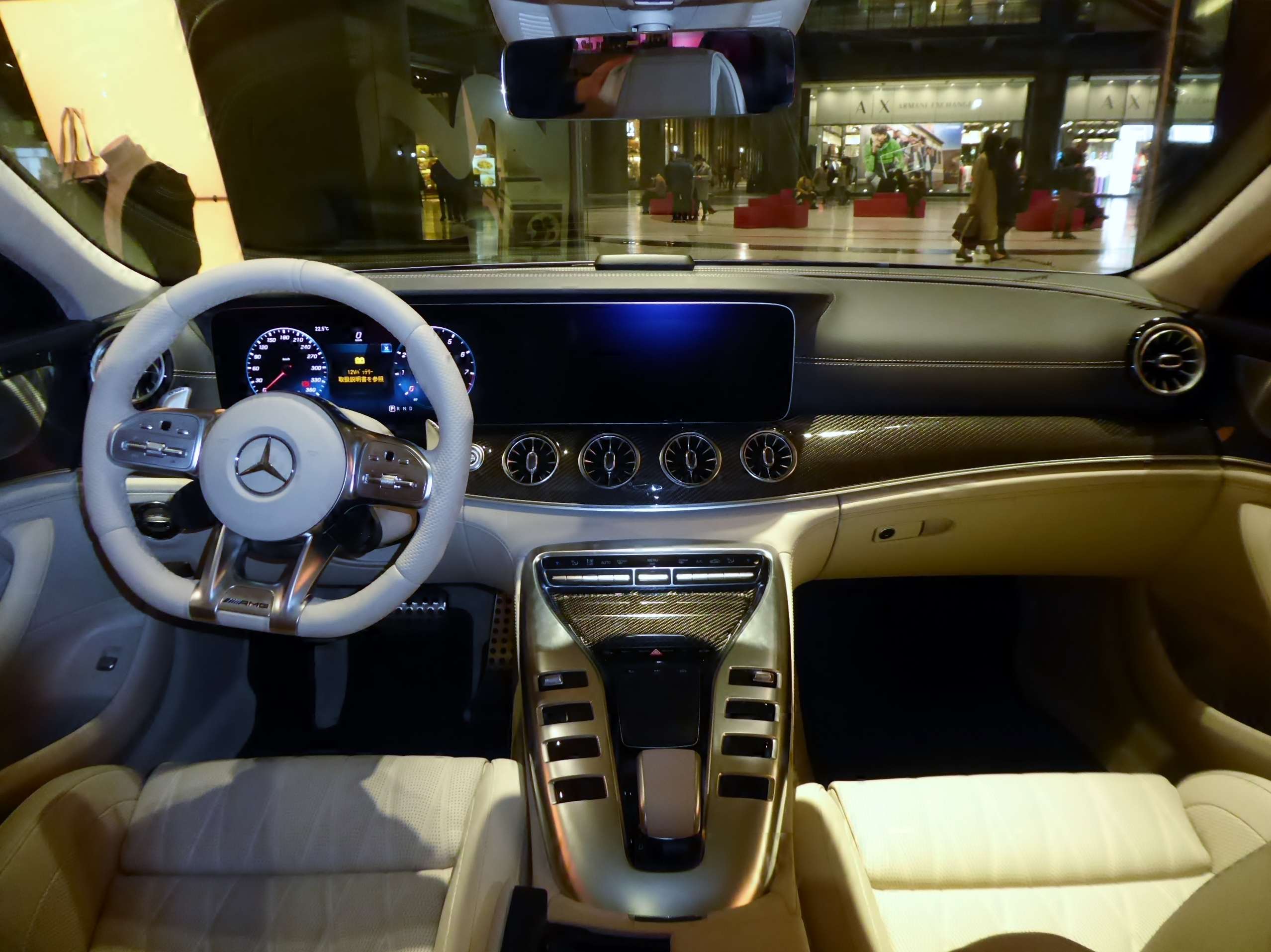
Interior

==== Mercedes-AMG GT 63 S E-Performance ====
The GT 63 S E-Performance is the top-of-the-line, flagship variant of the GT 4-Door. It is the first car to be launched under Mercedes’ new E Performance brand. It features the same 4.0L M177 Biturbo V8 engine, with the same electric motor powertrain as the Mercedes-Benz AMG GT Concept. The engine alone produces 470 kW (639 PS; 630 hp) from 5,500 to 6,500 rpm, and 900 N⋅m (664 lbf⋅ft) from 2,500 to 4,500 rpm. It is supplemented by a rear-mounted electric motor that spins up a maximum of 204 PS for 10-second bursts and can continually provide 95 PS, and 320 N⋅m (236 lbf⋅ft) of torque. Its combined power output is 620 kW (843 PS; 831 hp), with 1,400 N⋅m (1,033 lbf⋅ft) of torque, making it the most powerful AMG GT 4-Door model ever made. Acceleration from 0–60 mph (0–97 km/h) can be achieved in less than three seconds. The powertrain is named ‘V8 Biturbo E-Performance’. As for the PHEV system, the 6.1 kWh battery pack with the electric motor can commit to a pure EV range of 12 km (7.5 mi) at speeds of up to 130 km/h (81 mph).

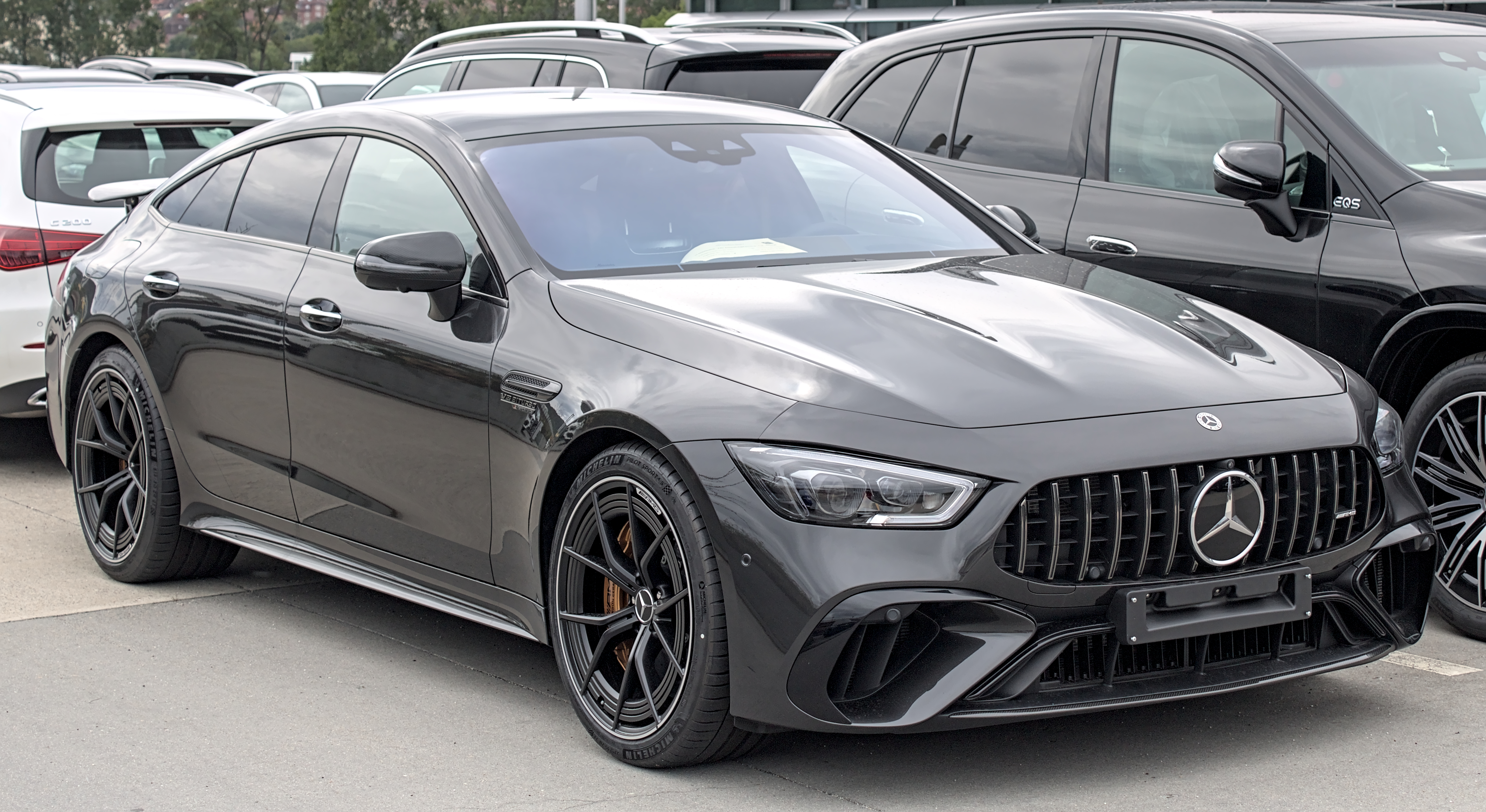
Mercedes-AMG GT 63 S E Performance

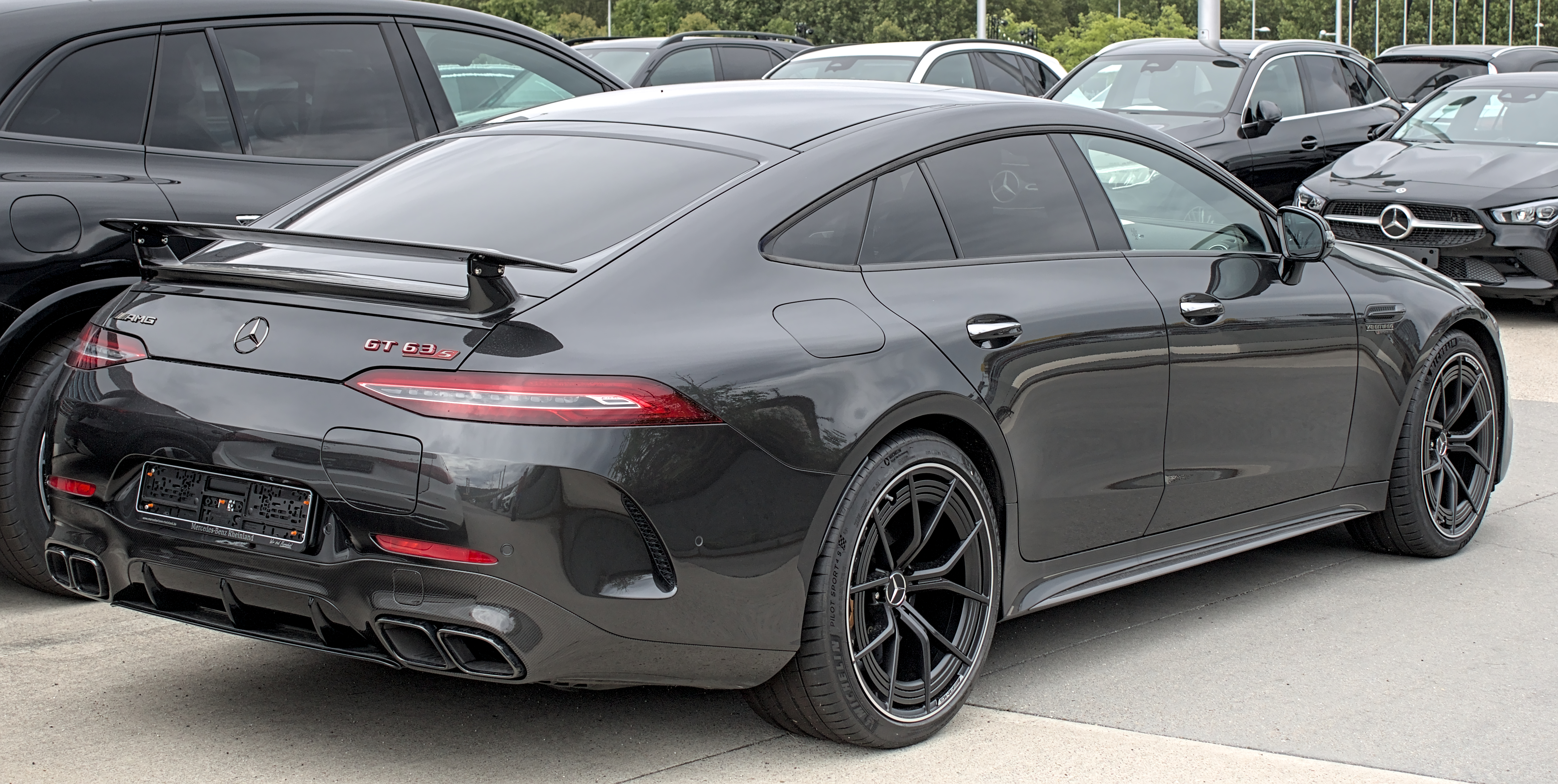
Rear view (GT 63 S E Performance)

== Second generation (C590; 2026) ==
Second generation

Overview
- Model code: C590
- Production: 2026 (to commence)
- Model years: 2027
- Assembly: Germany: Sindelfingen
- Designer: Mark Fetherston

Body and chassis
- Layout: Dual-motor, all-wheel-drive (GT 53 4Matic); Tri-motor, all-wheel-drive (GT 55 & 63 4Matic)
- Platform: AMG.EA
- Related: Mercedes-AMG GT SUV

Powertrain
- Electric motor: 2× YASA axial flux motors (1 front and 1 rear; GT 53); 3× YASA axial flux motors (1 front and 2 rear; GT 55 & 63)
- Power output: 400 kW (536 hp; 544 PS) (GT 53); 600 kW (805 hp; 816 PS) (GT 55); 860 kW (1,153 hp; 1,169 PS) (GT 63)
- Battery: AMG 800-volt High Performance Battery, 106-kWh lithium-ion NMC
- Range: 682–809 km (424–503 mi) (WLTP, claimed)
- Plug-in charging: 600-kW DC, 11-kW AC

Dimensions
- Wheelbase: 3,040 mm (119.7 in)
- Length: 5,094 mm (200.6 in)
- Width: 1,959 mm (77.1 in)
- Height: 1,411 mm (55.6 in)
- Curb weight: 2,460 kg (5,423 lb)

The second-generation AMG GT 4-Door Coupé was officially revealed on May 19 as a production model of the 2025 AMG GT XX concept. It is the first model to be based on the AMG-exclusive 800 volt "AMG Electric Architecture" (AMG.EA) platform.

Its design was largely inspired by the AMG GT XX concept. It features a large Panamericana grille with optional illumination, an optional front light bar ending in the shape of three-pointed stars, and six circular taillights with an three-pointed star each, mounted on a slatted gloss black panel. Its body remains low, with a fastback silhouette, while wheel sizes range from 19 to 21 inches. It features active aerodynamic elements known as "Aerokinetics"; standard elements include a multi-stage rear wing and louvres in the front fenders and wheel arches, while a Venturi element that can extend up to 6 in (15 cm) rearwards, located below the rear diffuser, is optional. It has a drag coefficient of 0.22.

The interior, which was revealed in March, is inspired by other recent Mercedes-Benz models. The cockpit features a triple display setup including a 10.2-inch instrument cluster, a 14-inch driver-oriented central multimedia screen, as well as a 14-inch front passenger display. There are also three physical "Race Engineer" knobs on the center console, allowing drivers to change the vehicle's drive modes and adjust variable drivetrain-related settings. It is offered in either a 4 or 5 seater configuration, with a 415 L (14.7 cu ft) trunk and 41 L (1.4 cu ft) frunk.

Rear view

Interior

=== Powertrain and specifications ===
The second-generation AMG GT 4-Door Coupé is available in three versions – the AMG GT53, GT55 and GT63. The GT63 uses three axial flux motors that produce a combined 1,153 hp (1,169 PS; 860 kW) and 1,475 lb⋅ft (2,000 N⋅m) of torque at its peak, accelerating from 0–100 km/h (0–62 mph) in 2.1 seconds, 0–200 km/h (0–124 mph) in 6.4 seconds, reaching a top speed of 299 km/h (186 mph). It has a continuous power output of 711 hp (721 PS; 530 kW) ambiently. Its rear motors are capable of spinning at up to 13,000 rpm and are managed by a single-speed planetary gearbox with water-cooled silicon-carbide inverters, while its front motor can spin at up to 15,000 rpm and are used as a boost unit, only providing power when necessary. All motors are integrated into a "High Performance Electric Drive Unit" (HP.EDU), which combines hydraulic pumps, suction filters and oil cooling.

The GT53 and GT55 models produce 536 hp (543 PS; 400 kW) and 805 hp (816 PS; 600 kW).

The drivetrain is powered by the AMG Race Engineer software controlled by the aforementioned knobs on the center console – the Response control adjusts throttle response, the Agility control adjusts torque distribution, and the Traction control adjusts traction at 9 stages. It also features rear wheel steering up to 6 degrees, a simulated gearbox, and a synthetic soundtrack that replicates a V8 engine.

It uses a specially developed 106 kWh NMCA (nickel-manganese-cobalt-aluminum) battery known as the "AMG High Performance Electric Battery (AMG HP.EB)" that provides up to 503 mi (809 km) of WLTP range on the GT53. The cylindrical battery cells used in this design are optimized to be smaller, with a height and diameter of 10.5 cm (4 in) and 2.6 cm (1 in) respectively. They also feature laser-welded aluminum housings with increased electrical and thermal conductivity, as well as a full-tab design which fully connects the cell winding to the poles. It can charge at up to 600 kWh, going from 10% to 80% within 11 minutes.
