= Mercedes-Benz MRA platform =

Mercedes-Benz MRA

Overview
- Manufacturer: Mercedes-Benz
- Production: 2014–present

Body and chassis
- Layout: Front-engine, rear-wheel drive; Front-engine, all-wheel drive (4Matic)

The Mercedes-Benz MRA platform (Modular Rear Architecture) is an automobile platform made by Mercedes-Benz since 2014. The first car to utilize it is the 2014 Mercedes-Benz C-Class (W205).

== First generation MRA Mid-Size ==
- 2014–2021 Mercedes-Benz C-Class (W205 / S205)
- 2015–2021 Mercedes-Benz C-Class (C205 / A205)
- 2015–2022 Mercedes-Benz GLC-Class (X253 / C253)
- 2016–2023 Mercedes-Benz E-Class (W213 / S213)
- 2016–2023 Mercedes-Benz E-Class (C238 / A238)
- 2016–2023 Mercedes-Benz E-Class (V213)
- 2018–2023 Mercedes-Benz CLS-Class (C257)
- 2018–2025 Mercedes-AMG GT 4-Door Coupé (X290)
- 2019–2023 Mercedes-Benz EQC (N293)
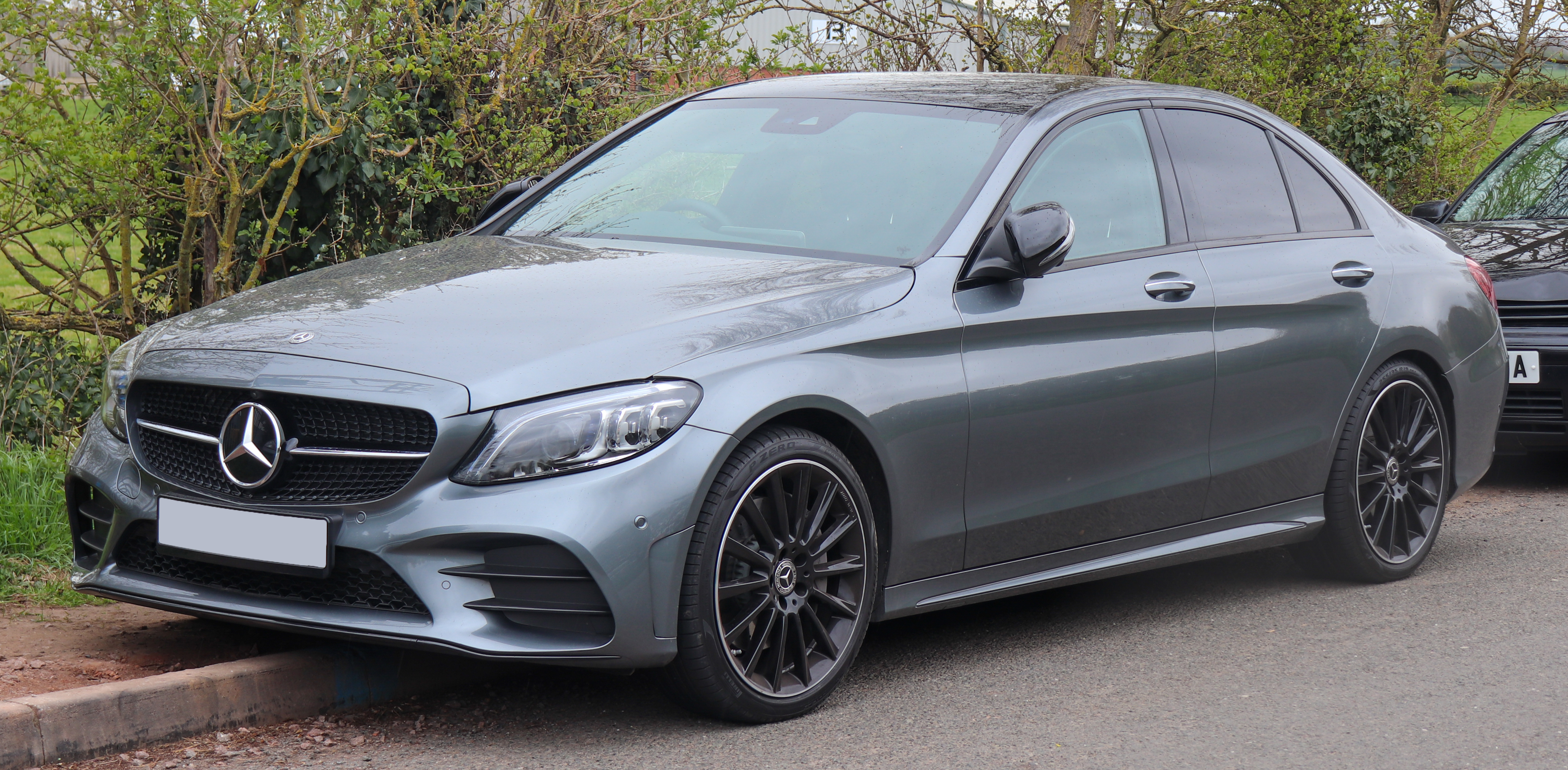
Mercedes-Benz C-Class (W205 / S205)

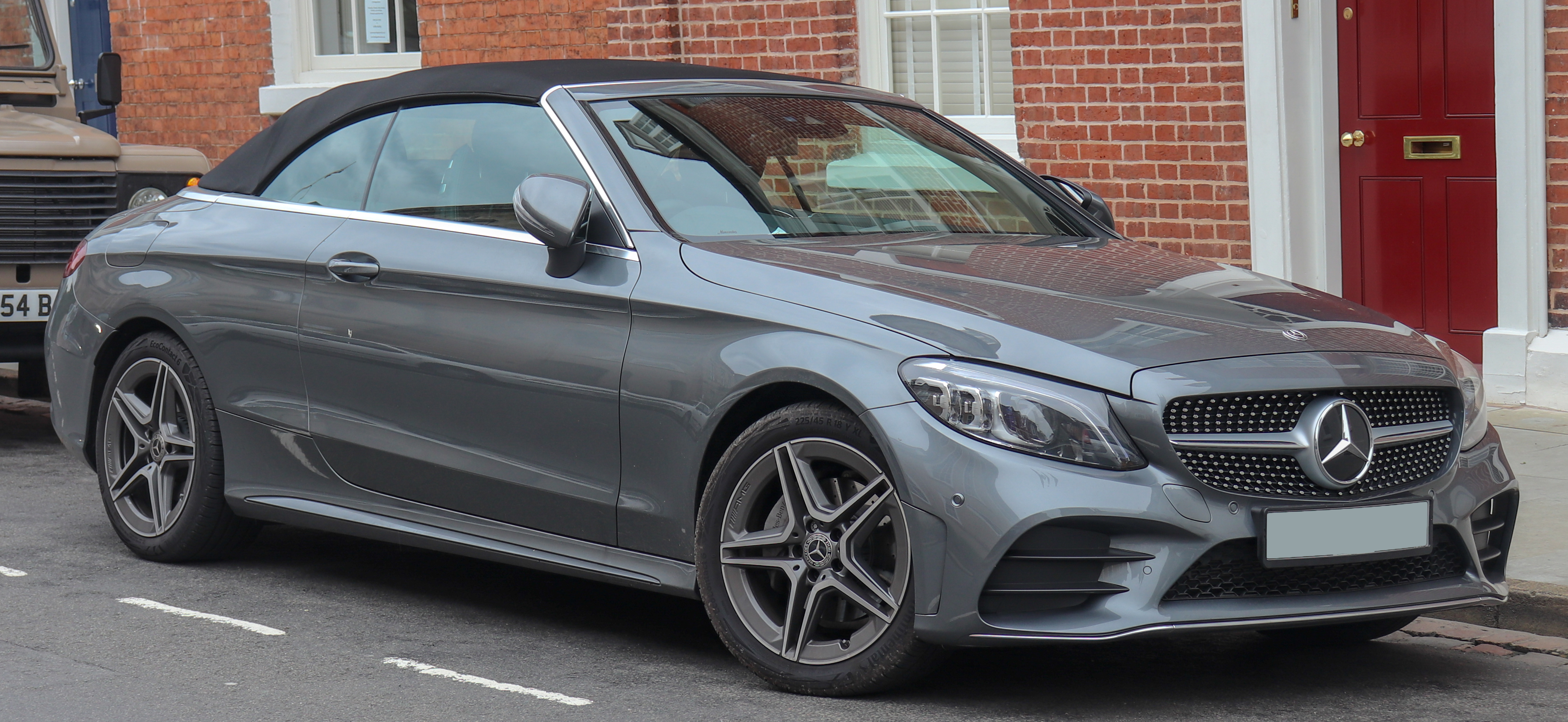
Mercedes-Benz C-Class (C205 / A205)

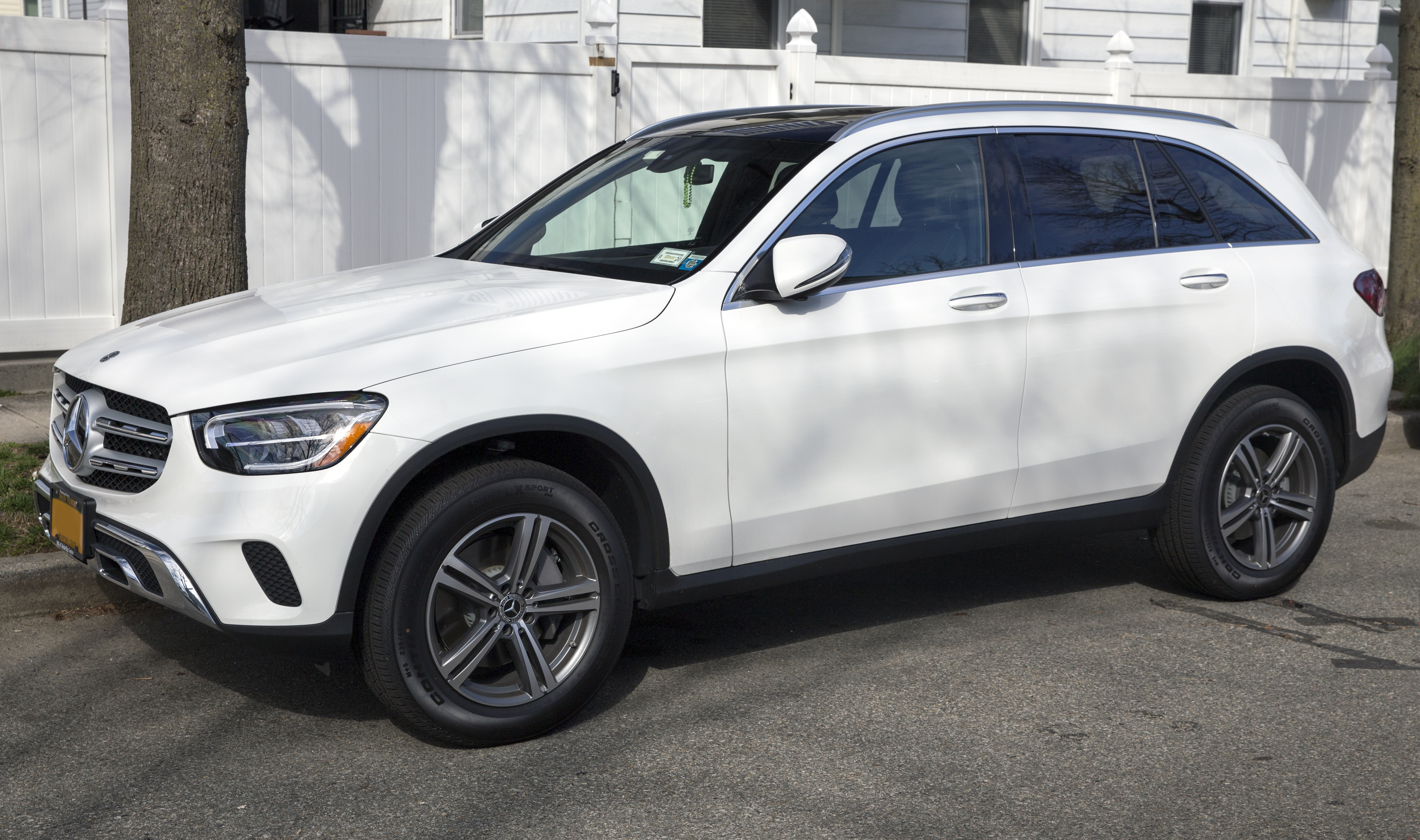
Mercedes-Benz GLC-Class (X253 / C253)

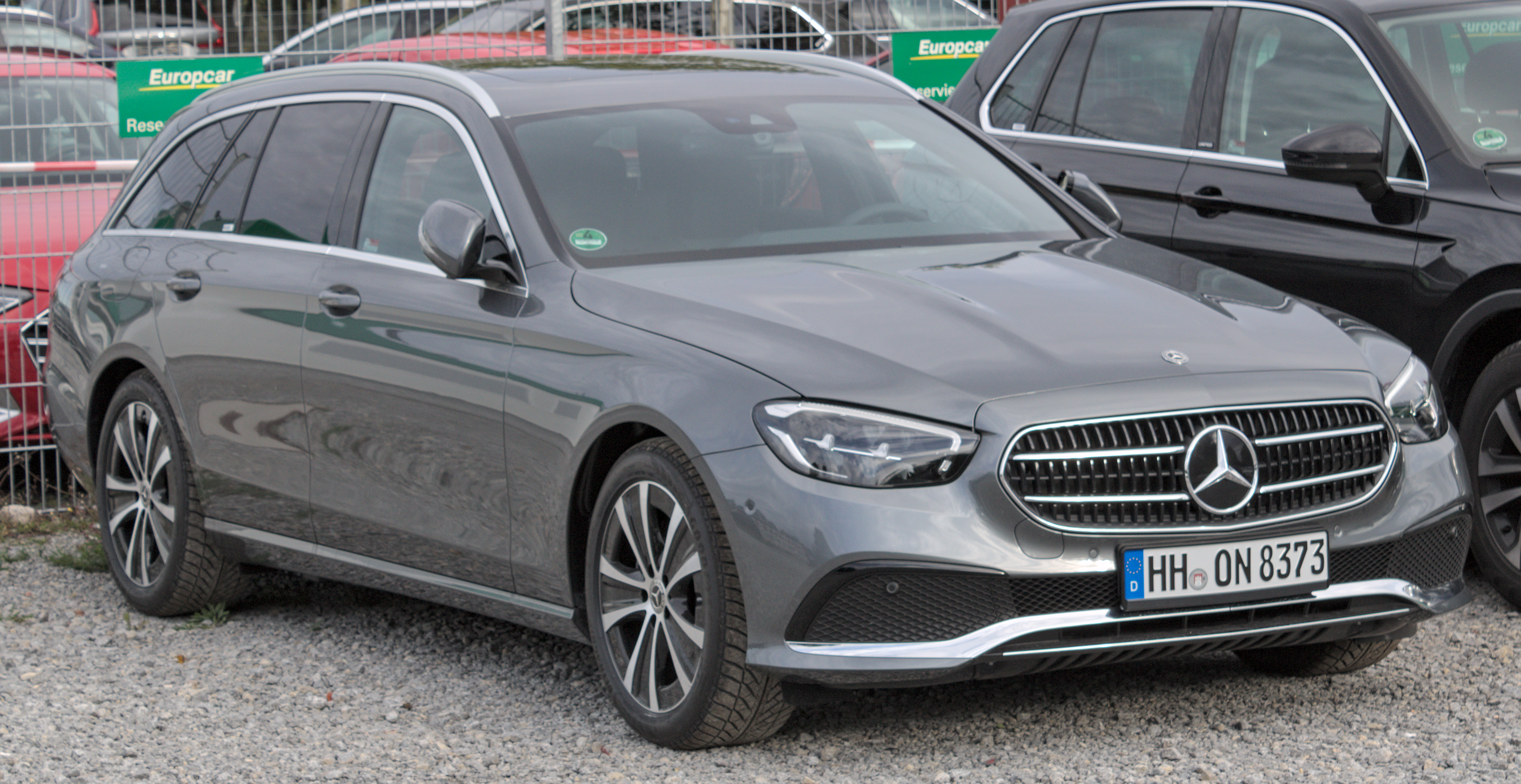
Mercedes-Benz E-Class (W213 / S213)

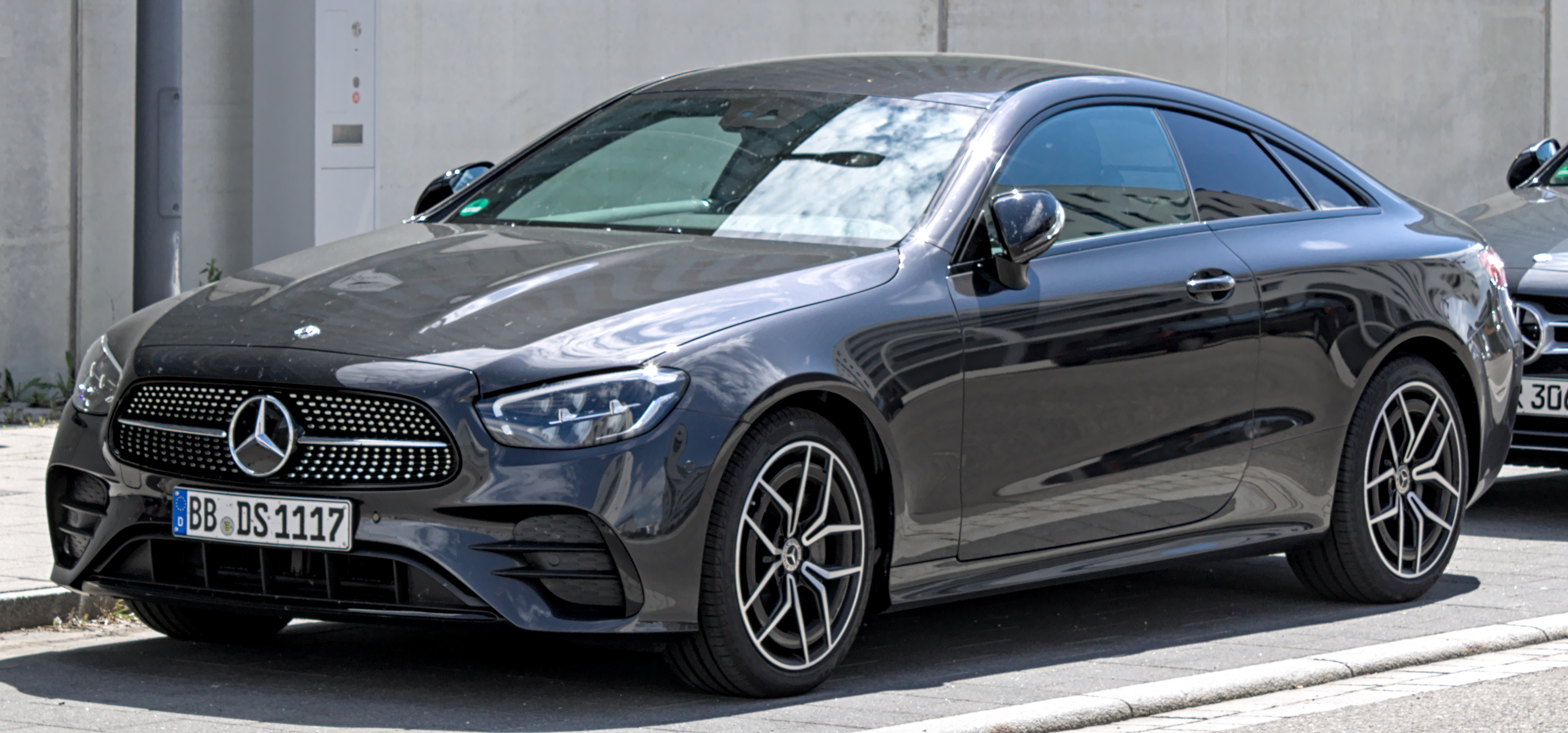
Mercedes-Benz E-Class (C238 / A238)

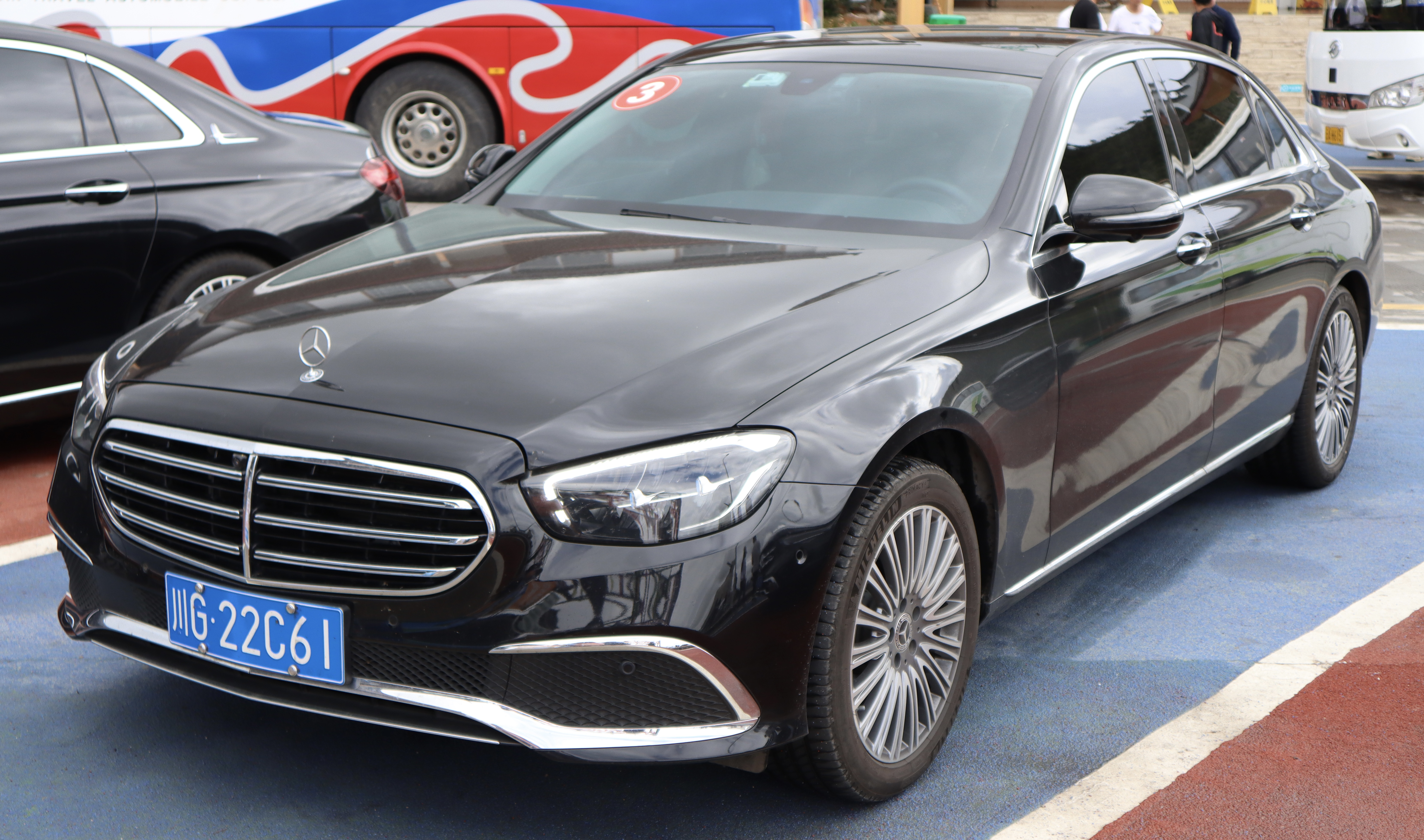
Mercedes-Benz E-Class (V213)

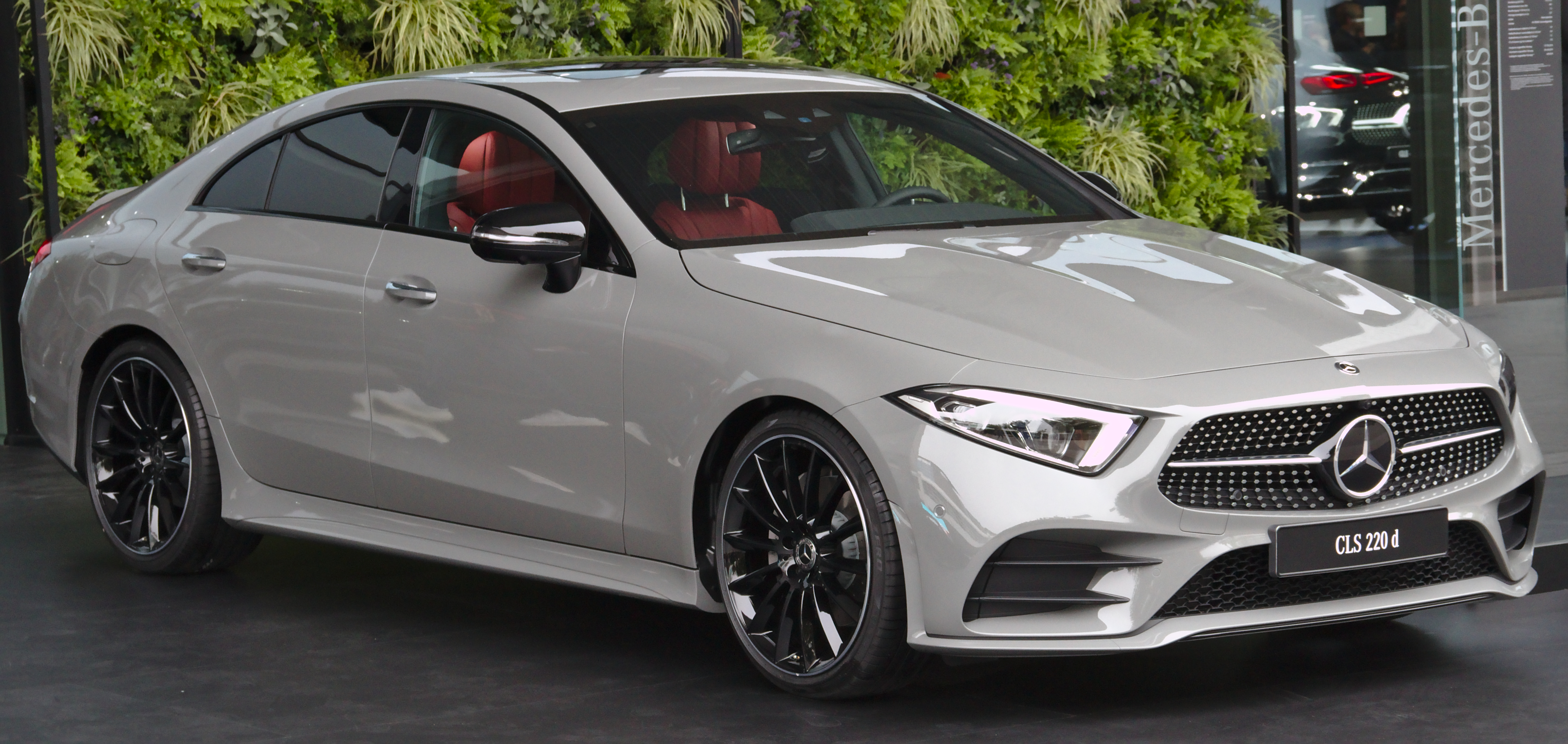
Mercedes-Benz CLS-Class (C257)

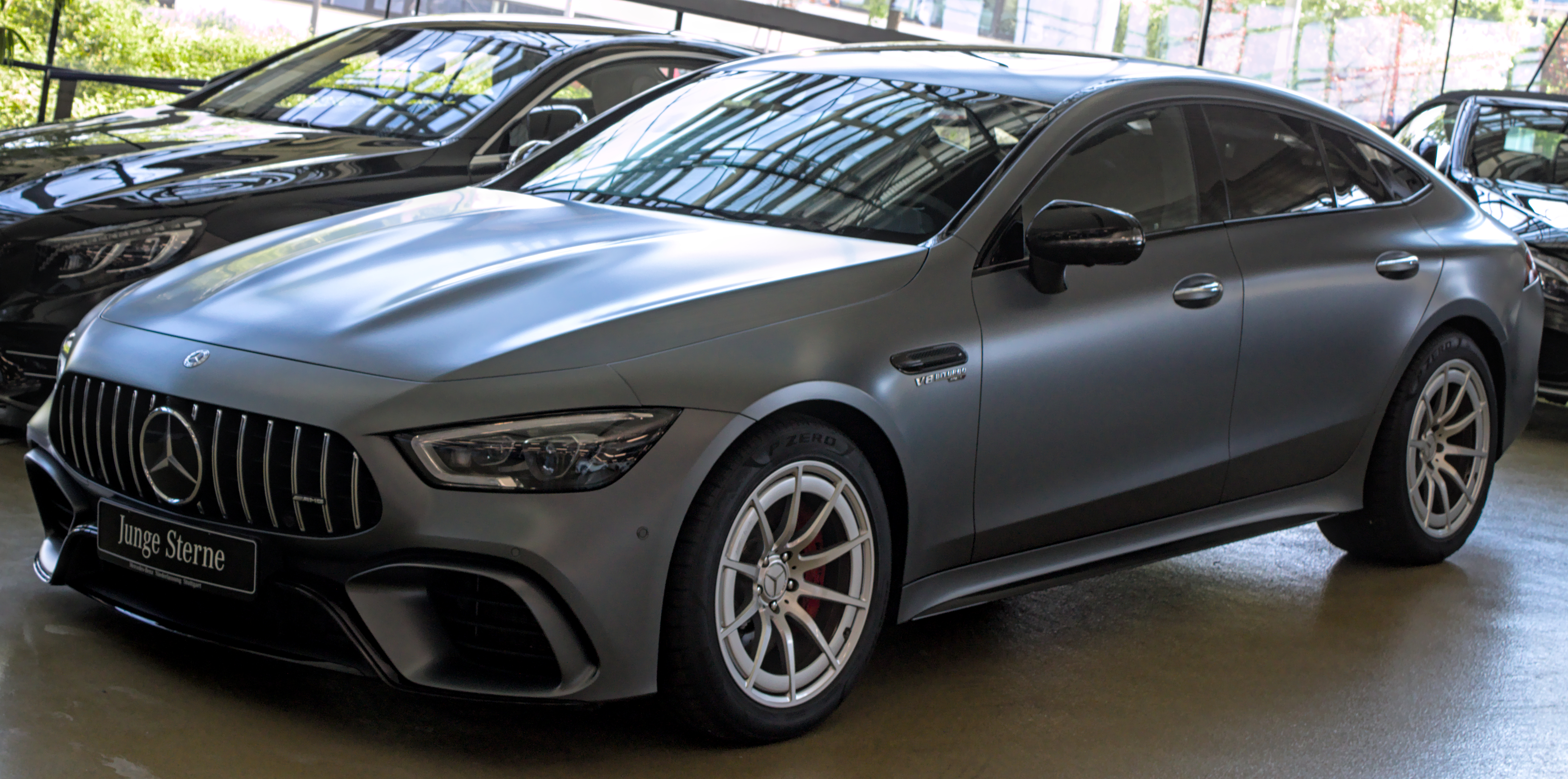
Mercedes-AMG GT 4-Door Coupé (X290)

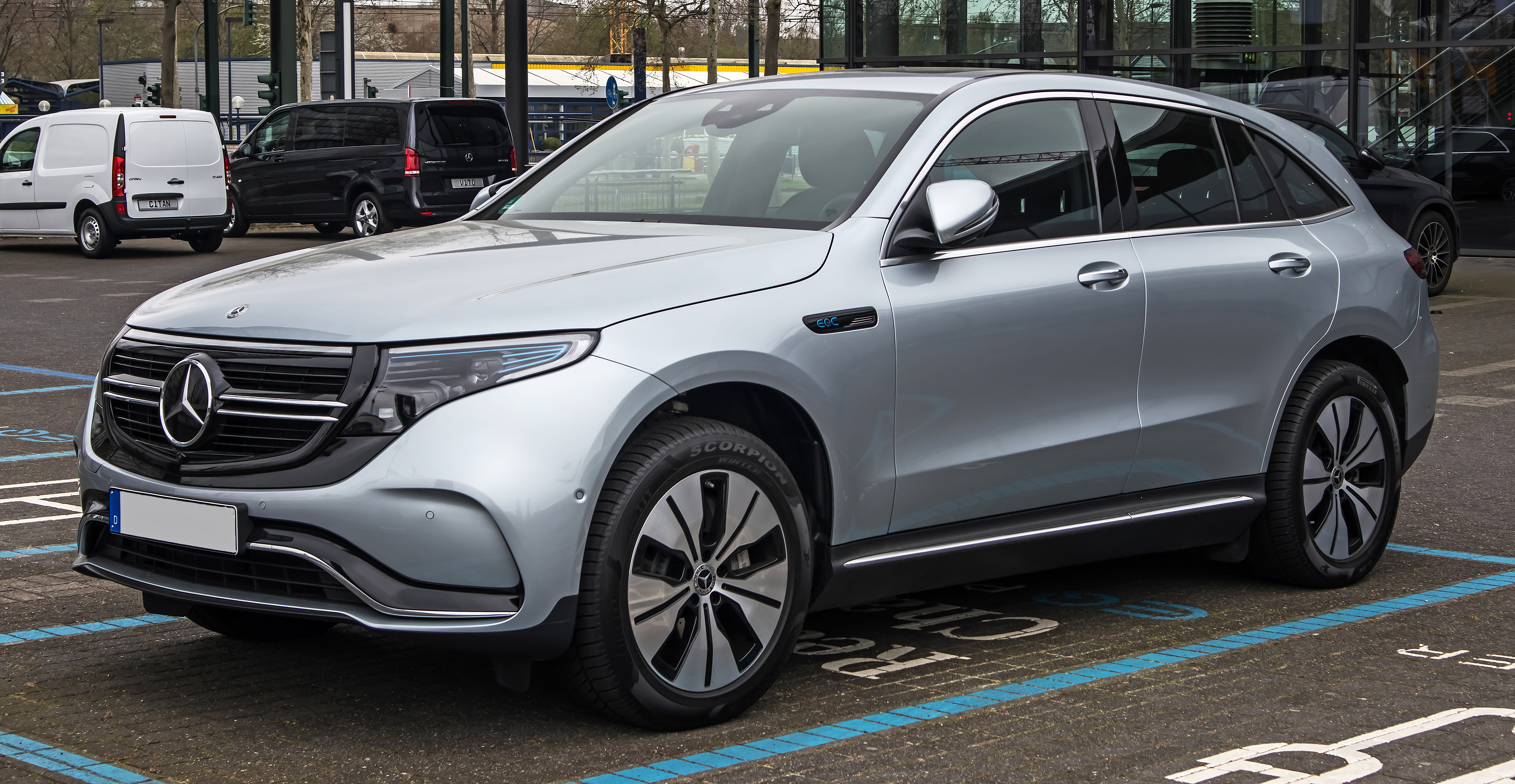
Mercedes-Benz EQC (N293)

== MRA Large ==
- 2021–present Mercedes-Benz S-Class (W223 / V223)
- 2021–present Mercedes-Maybach S-Class (Z223)
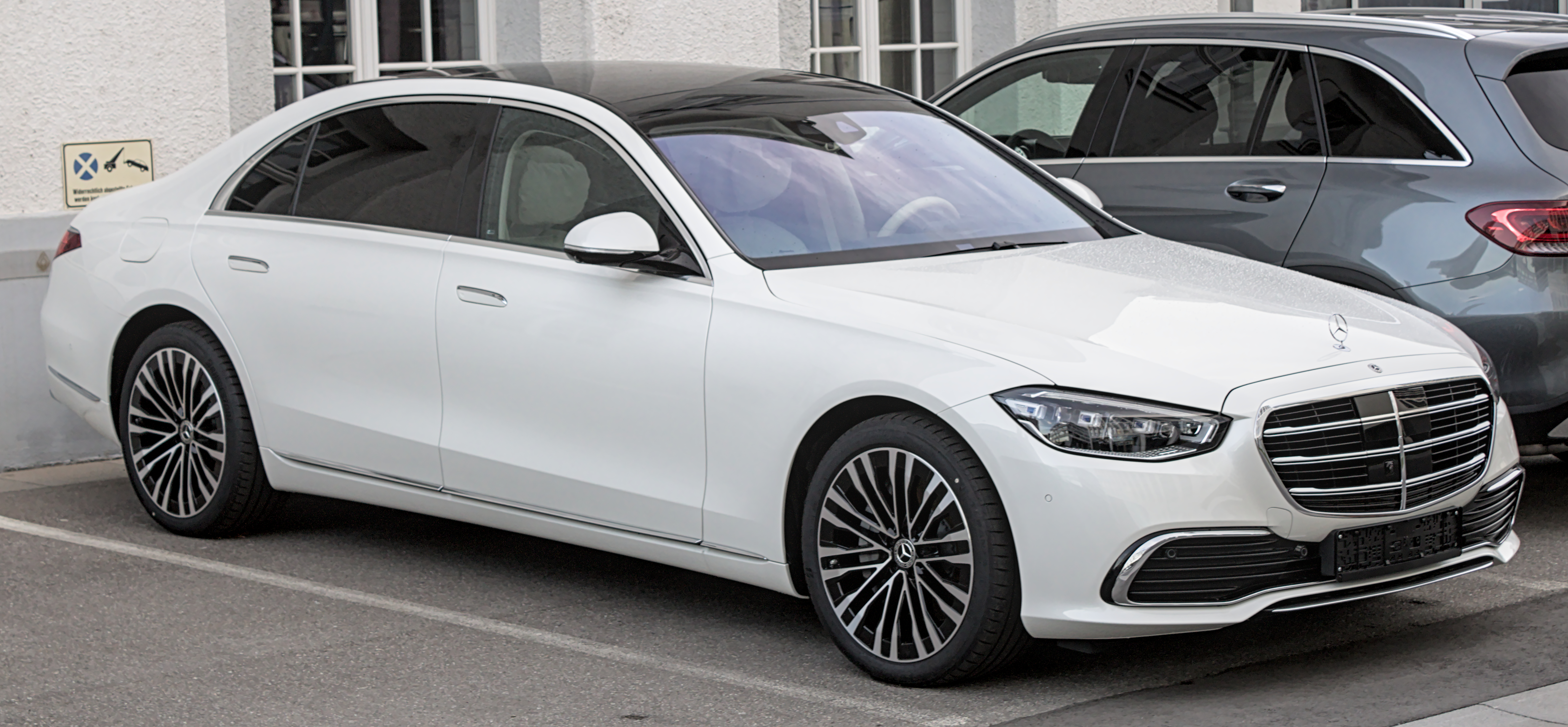
Mercedes-Benz S-Class (W223 / V223)

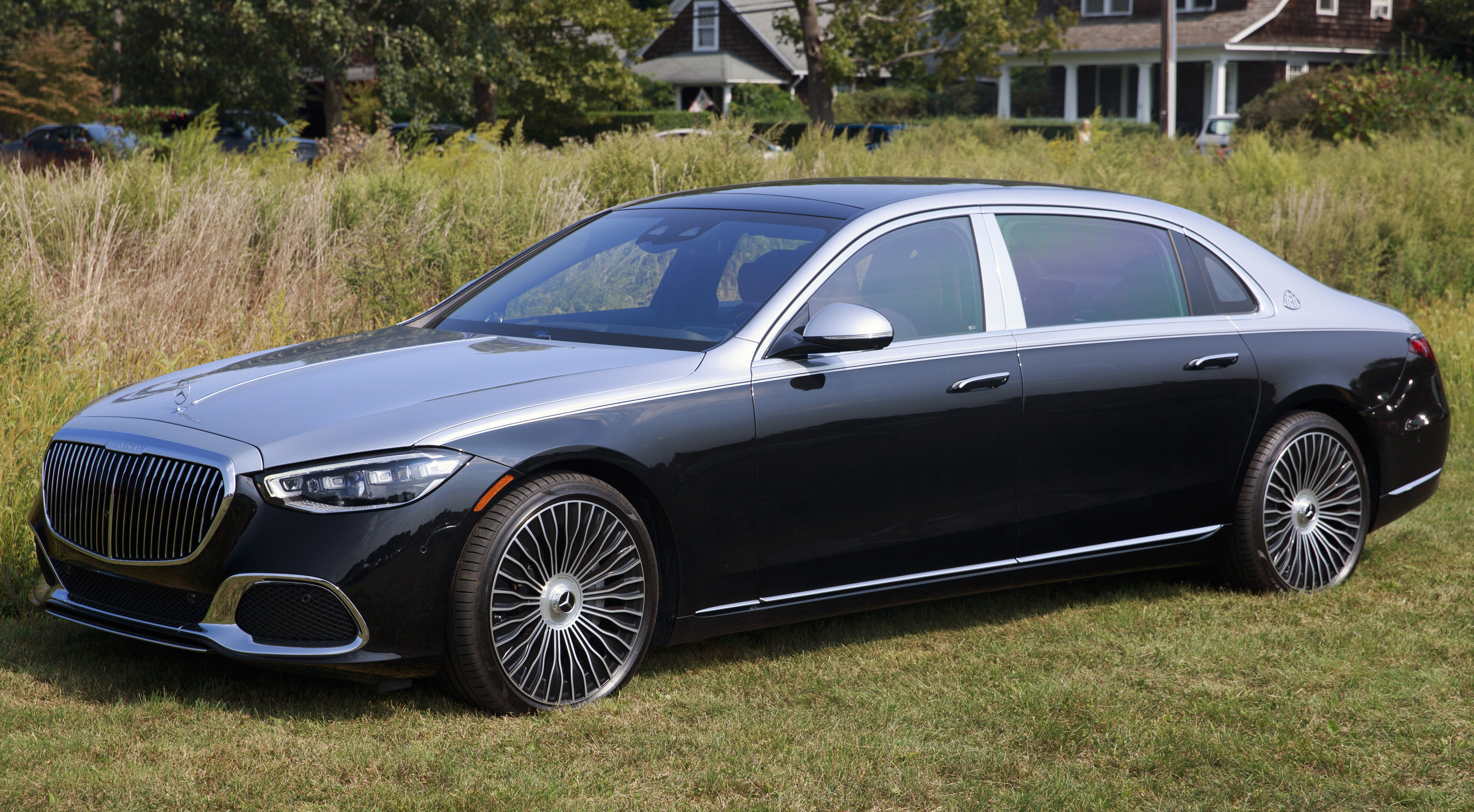
Mercedes-Maybach S-Class (Z223)

== Second generation MRA Mid-Size ==
- 2021–present Mercedes-Benz C-Class (W206 / S206 / V206 / X206)
- 2022–present Mercedes-Benz GLC-Class (X254 / C254)
- 2023–present Mercedes-Benz E-Class (W214 / S214 / X214)
- 2024–present Mercedes-Benz CLE (C236 / A236)
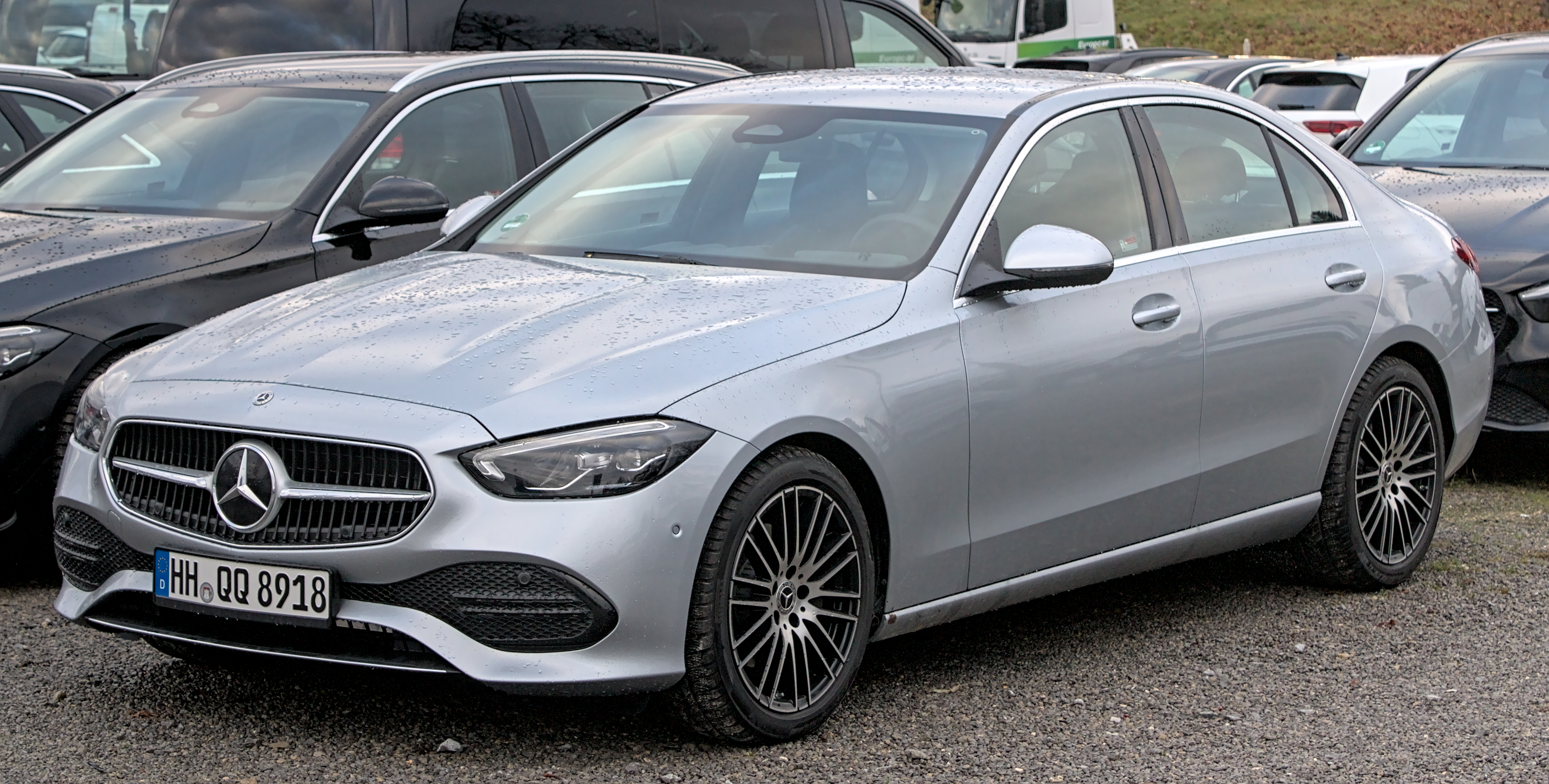
Mercedes-Benz C-Class (W206 / S206 / V206 / X206)

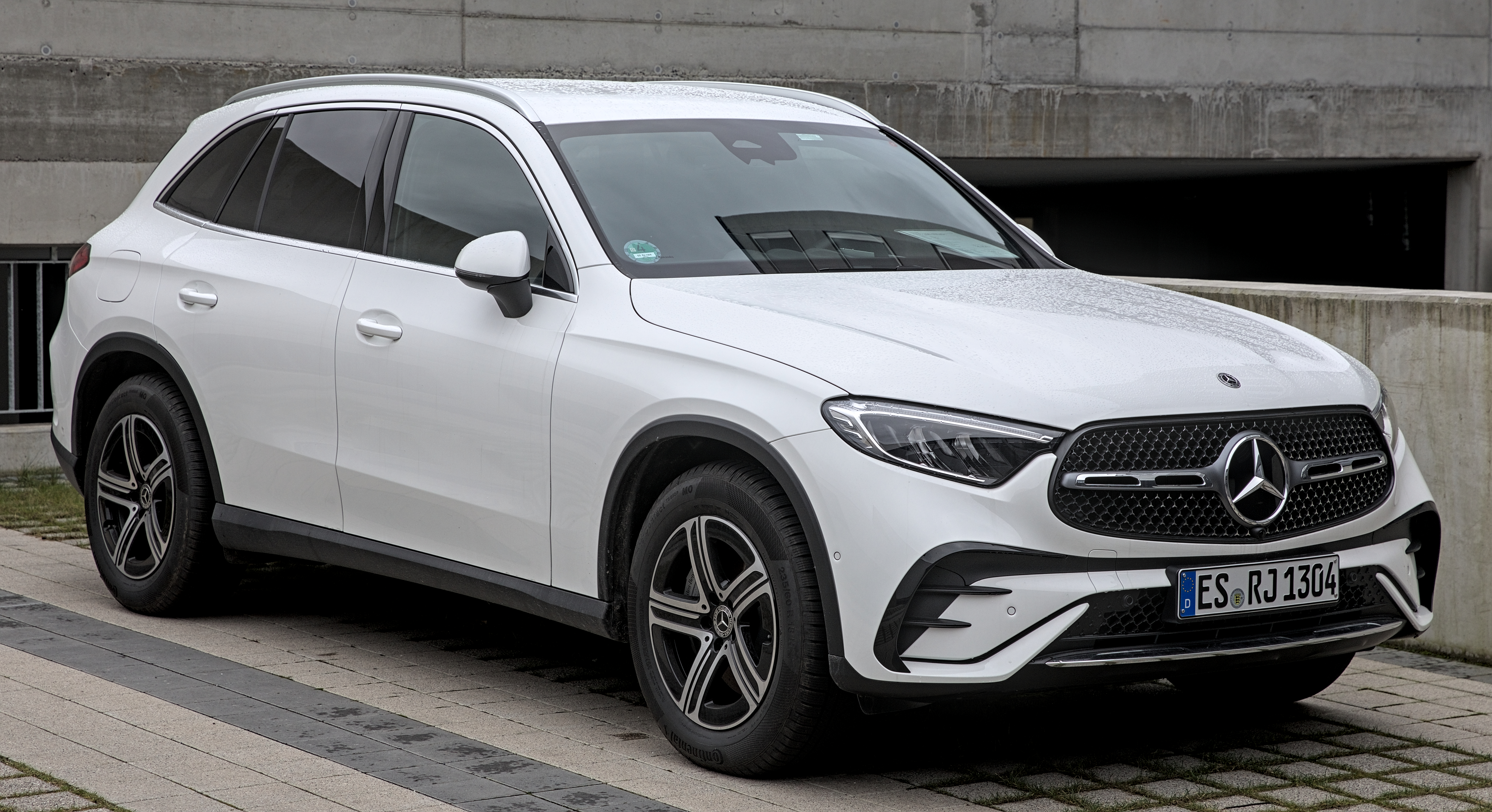
Mercedes-Benz GLC-Class (X254 / C254)

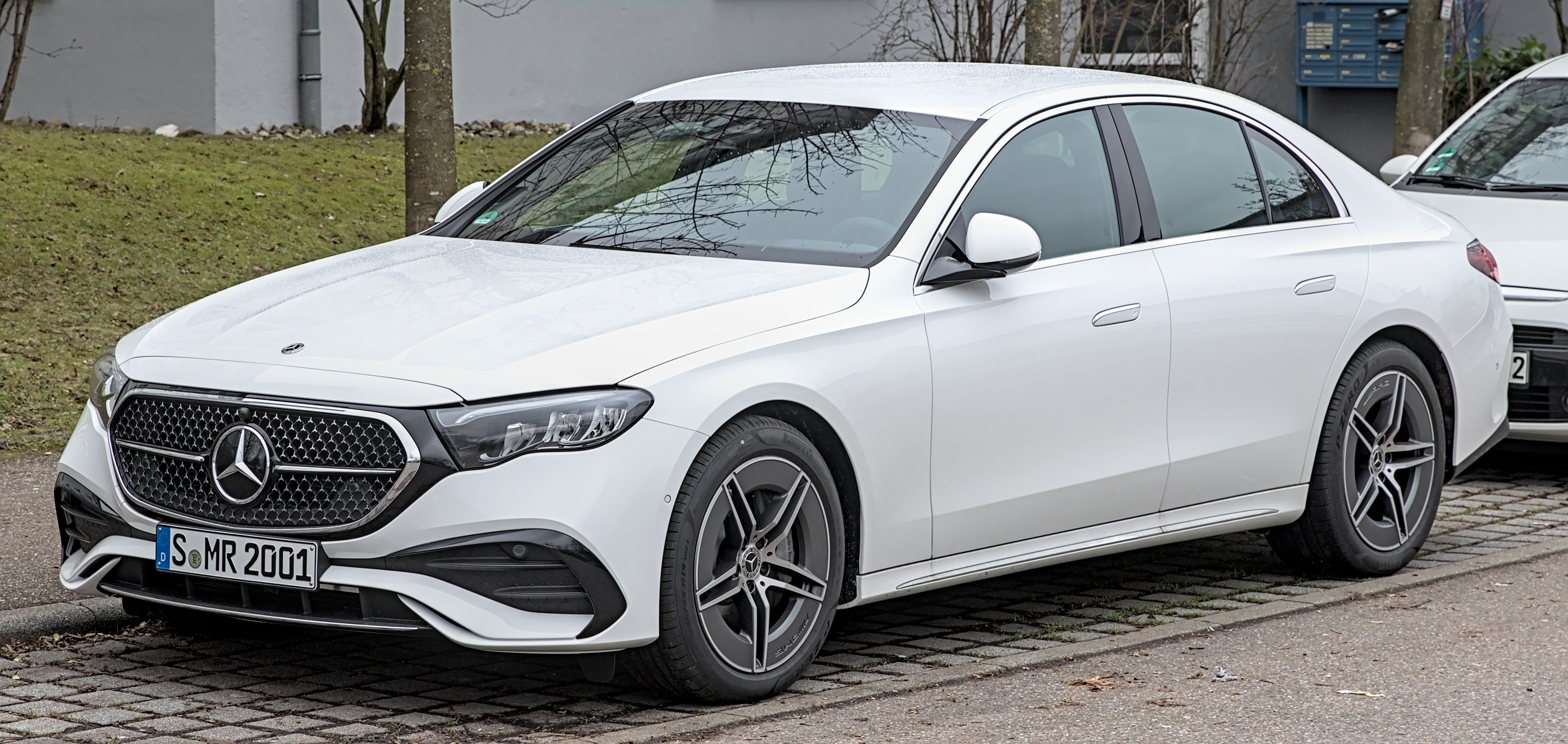
Mercedes-Benz E-Class (W214 / S214 / X214)

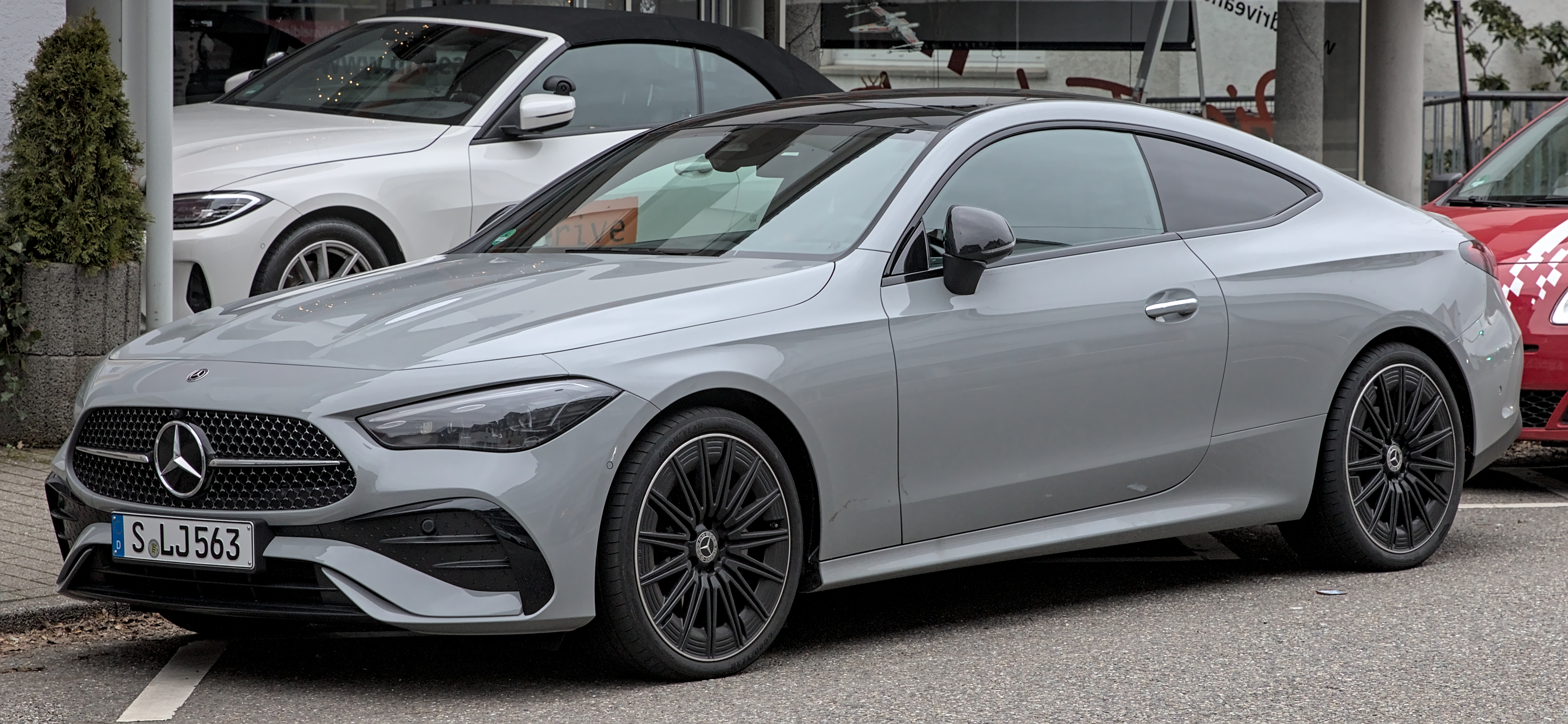
Mercedes-Benz CLE (C236 / A236)
