= Mercedes-Benz CLE =

Grand tourer

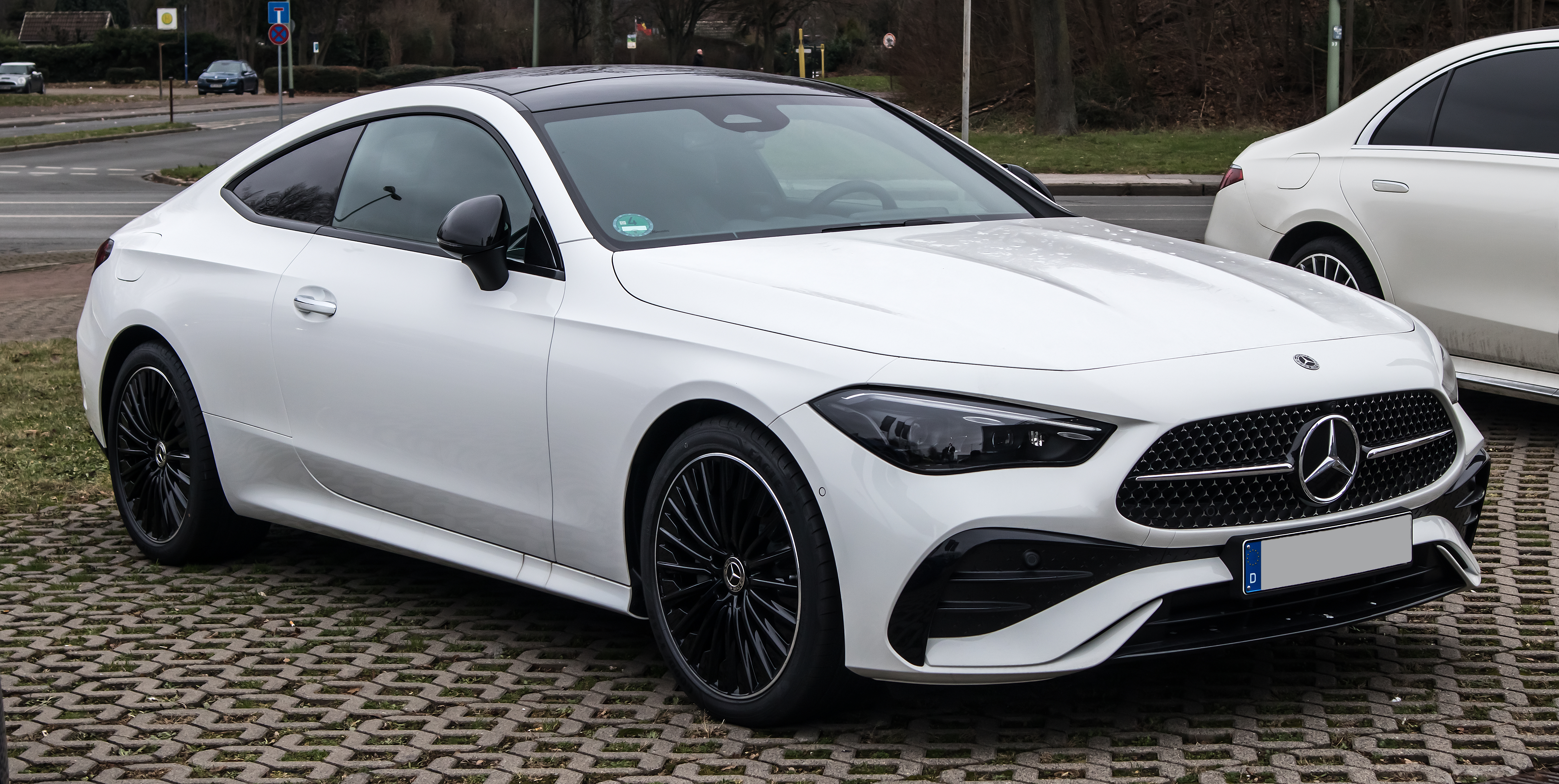

Overview
- Manufacturer: Mercedes-Benz Group
- Model code: C236 (coupe); A236 (cabriolet)
- Production: October 2023 – present (coupe); April 2024 – present (cabrio)
- Model years: 2024–present
- Assembly: Germany: Bremen; Thailand: Samut Prakan (TAAP)
- Designer: Balázs Filczer

Body and chassis
- Class: Grand tourer (S)
- Body style: 2-door coupé 2-door cabriolet
- Layout: Front-engine, rear-wheel-drive Front-engine, four-wheel-drive (4Matic)
- Platform: MRA2
- Related: Mercedes-Benz C-Class (W206); Mercedes-Benz E-Class (W214)

Powertrain
- Engine: Petrol: 2.0 L M254 mild hybrid turbo I4; 3.0 L M256 mild hybrid turbo I6; 4.0 L M177 Evo mild hybrid twin-turbo V8 (AMG CLE 646 Spezialanfertigung); Petrol plug-in hybrid: 2.0 L M254 I4 (CLE 300e); Diesel: 2.0 L OM654 mild hybrid I4 (CLE 220d)
- Electric motor: 23 hp Mitsubishi electric 48-volt integrated starter generator (ISG); Permanent magnet Syncronus motor
- Transmission: 9-speed 9G-Tronic automatic
- Hybrid drivetrain: Mild hybrid Plug-in Hybrid (CLE 300e)
- Battery: 48-volt Li-ion (MHEV); 25.4 kWh High voltage Lithium-ion (PHEV)

Dimensions
- Wheelbase: 2,865 mm (112.8 in)
- Length: 4,850–4,853 mm (190.9–191.1 in)
- Width: 1,860 mm (73.2 in)
- Height: 1,428 mm (56.2 in)
- Curb weight: 1,790–2,110 kg (3,946–4,652 lb)

Chronology
- Predecessor: Mercedes-Benz C-Class (C205 & A205); Mercedes-Benz E-Class (C238 & A238)

The Mercedes-Benz CLE is a grand tourer which consists of the C236 coupe and the A236 cabriolet that were both launched in 2023 and replaced both the C and E-Class coupes. A performance variant, the Mercedes-AMG CLE 53 was released and a more powerful CLE 63, is also planned for 2027.

== Overview ==
In 2005 a car named the "CLE" was rumoured and was expected to arrive in mid-2006. Thought to be based on the W204, a car of this type never came to production—until 2023.

The CLE Coupe replaced both the C-Class Coupe and E-Class Coupe as part of Mercedes' drive to streamline its model range. At 191 inches from bumper to bumper, the CLE is 1 inch longer than the outgoing E-class coupe but 6.5 inches longer than the outgoing C-class coupe. The added length mostly in the overhang size, with the CLE's 112.8-inch wheelbase within an inch of both of its predecessors. The CLE Coupe adopted the window design of the C-Class coupe with a B pillar and fixed rear windows, rather than the pillarless design of the E-Class Coupe with roll down rear windows.

Official manufacture of the coupe began in October 2023, while the convertible followed in April 2024.

== Equipment ==
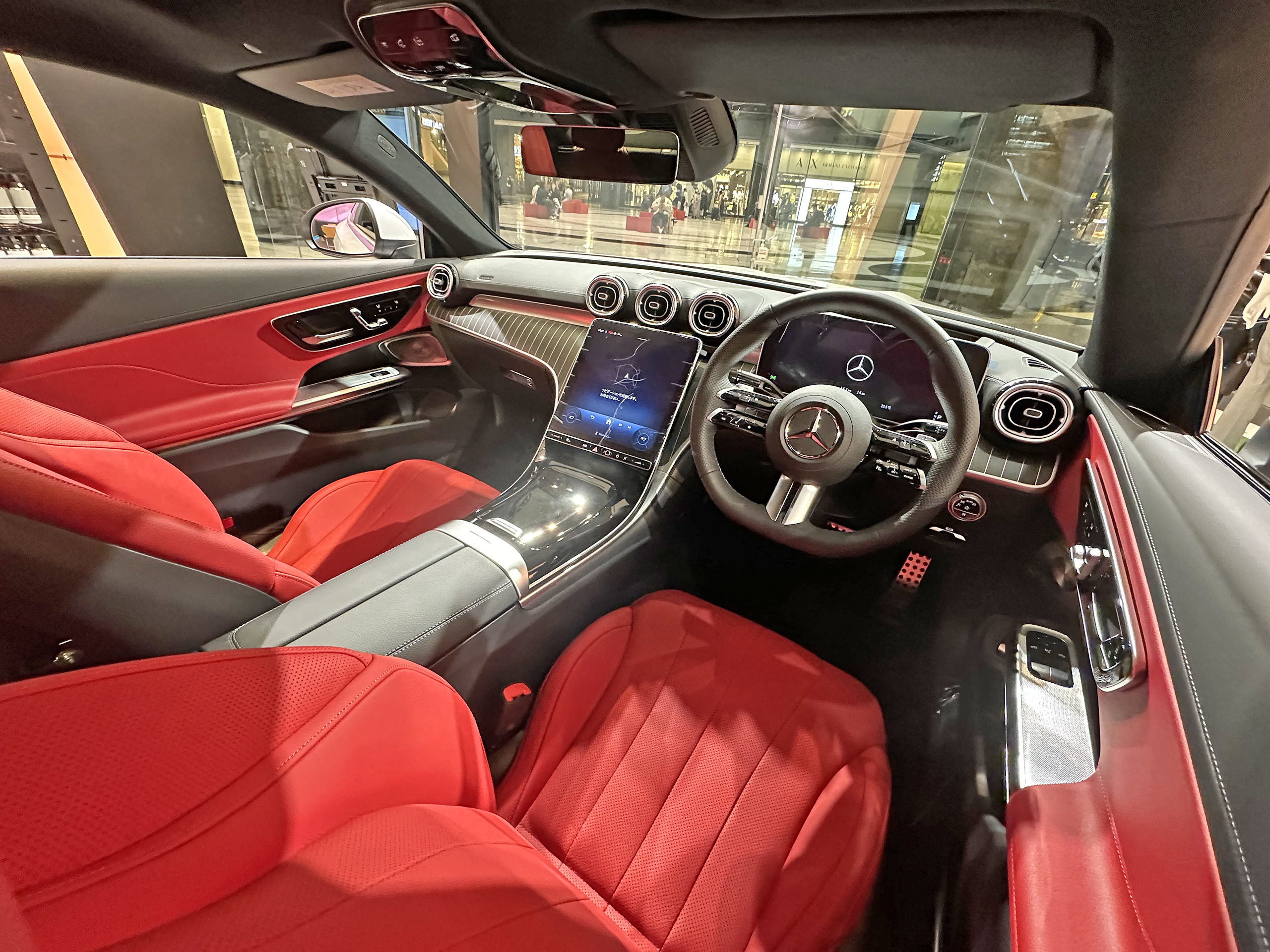
Interior

The CLE has a rounded, single-bar grille with a honeycomb mesh insert and is accompanied by C-Class-style headlights and sporty air intakes. The rear includes LED taillights and an angular boot with an integrated spoiler. There is also a curved bumper that does not have exhaust cutouts.

It also features the latest iteration of the Mercedes-Benz User Experience (MBUX) system, which is also seen on multiple other models. The 11.9-inch vertically-positioned touchscreen comes with a 12.3-inch instrument cluster.

The CLE features the KEYLESS-GO system and the GUARD 360° safety system which helps monitor the vehicle’s surroundings, and notifies the owner of collision detection via the Mercedes me app.

The Cabriolet model additionally features an acoustic soft top, AIRCAP electric wind deflector system, AIRSCARF neck-level heating and ventilation, and electric cargo divider system.

== Variants ==
The engine options of the CLE are shared with its saloon counterpart, the W214 E-Class, all of which feature the 48-volt EQ-boost mild hybrid system. This integrated starter-generator running on the 48-volt electrical system provides a boost of 23 hp and 148 pound-feet through the electric motor.

Four models are available at launch, which include the petrol CLE 200, CLE 300, CLE 450, and the diesel CLE 220d.

=== CLE 300 ===
The base CLE 300 is powered by the M254 motor, a turbocharged 2.0-liter inline-four producing 255 horsepower and 295 pound-feet of torque.

=== CLE 450 ===
The CLE 450 is powered by the M256 motor, a turbocharged 3.0-liter inline-six producing 375 hp and 369 pound-feet.

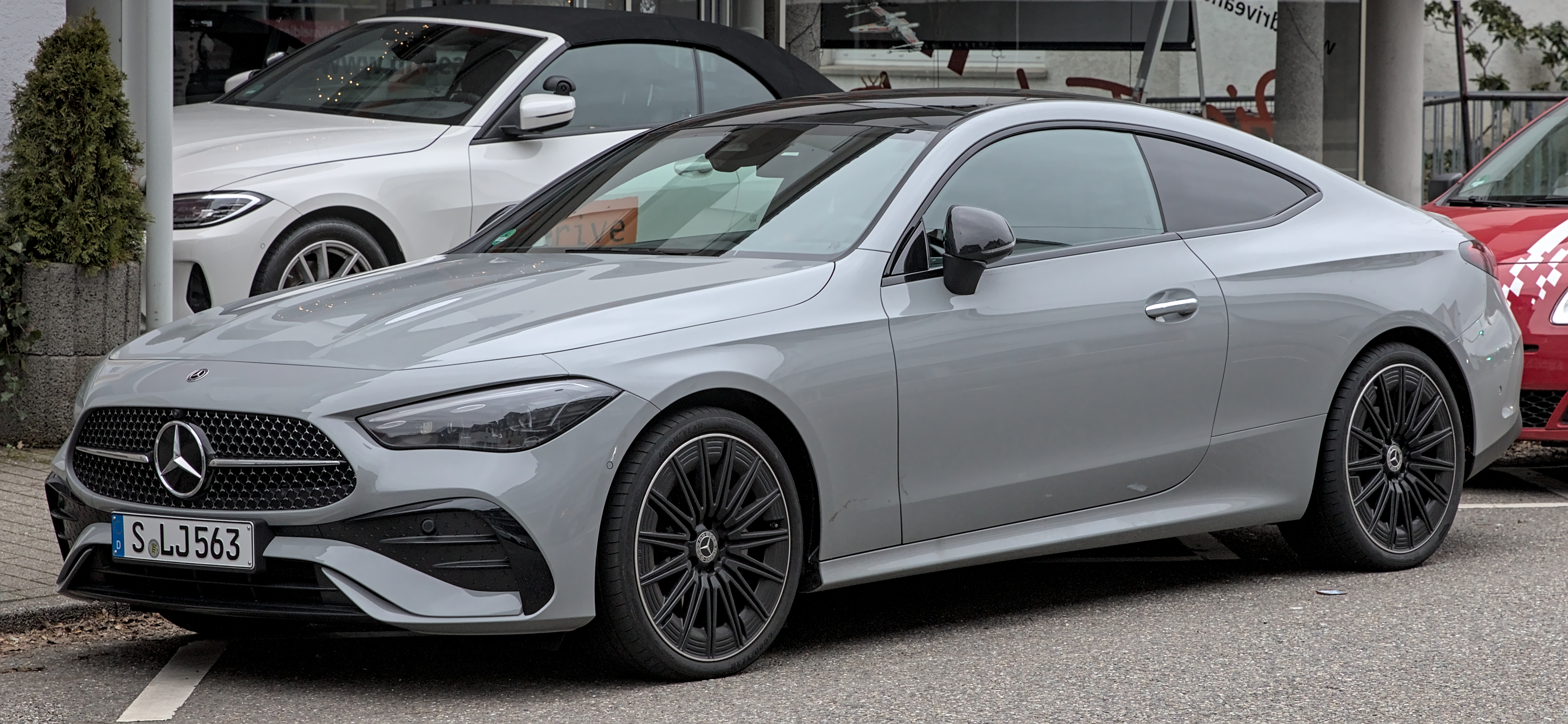
Coupe (C236)

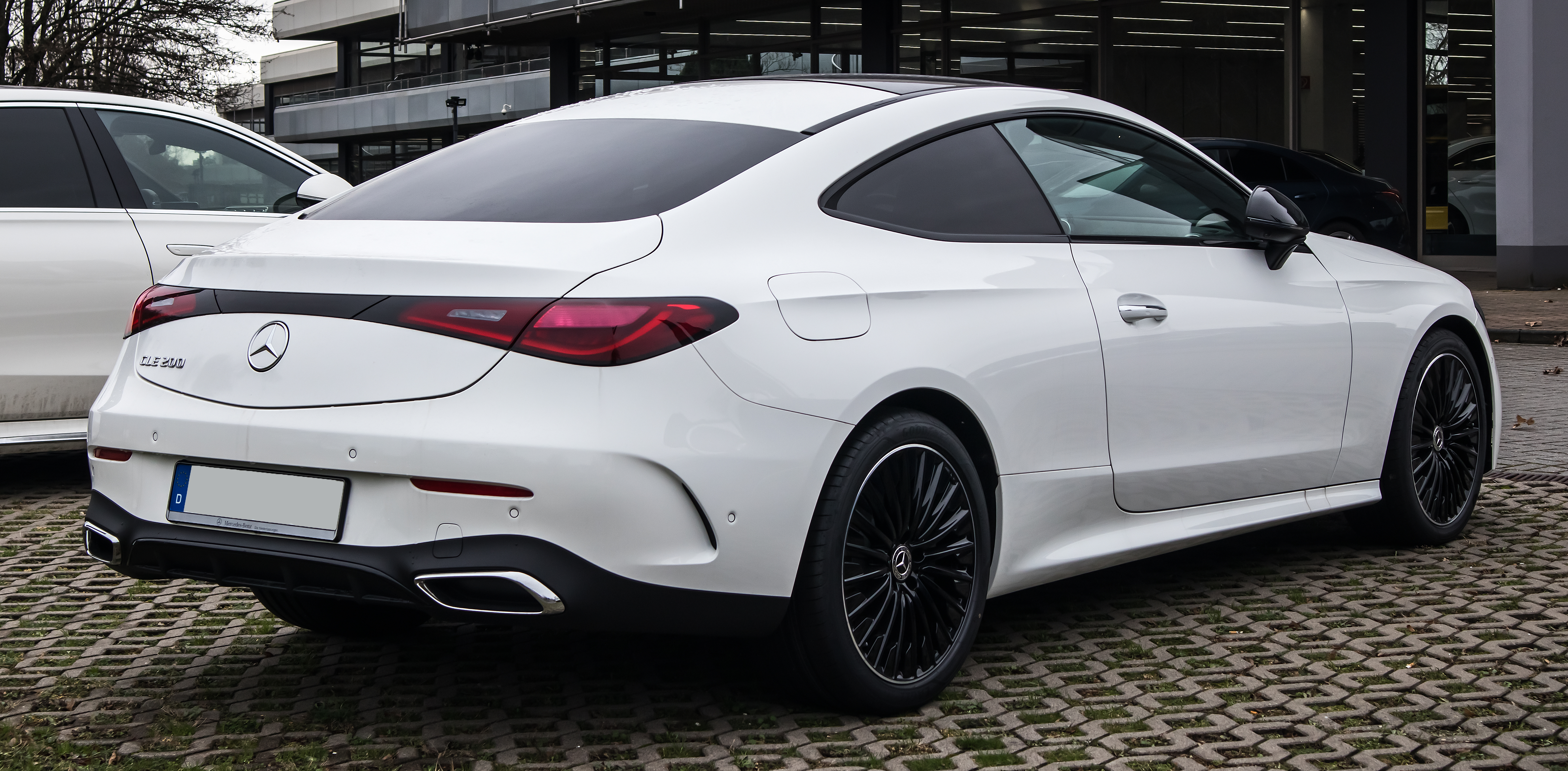
Rear view (C236)

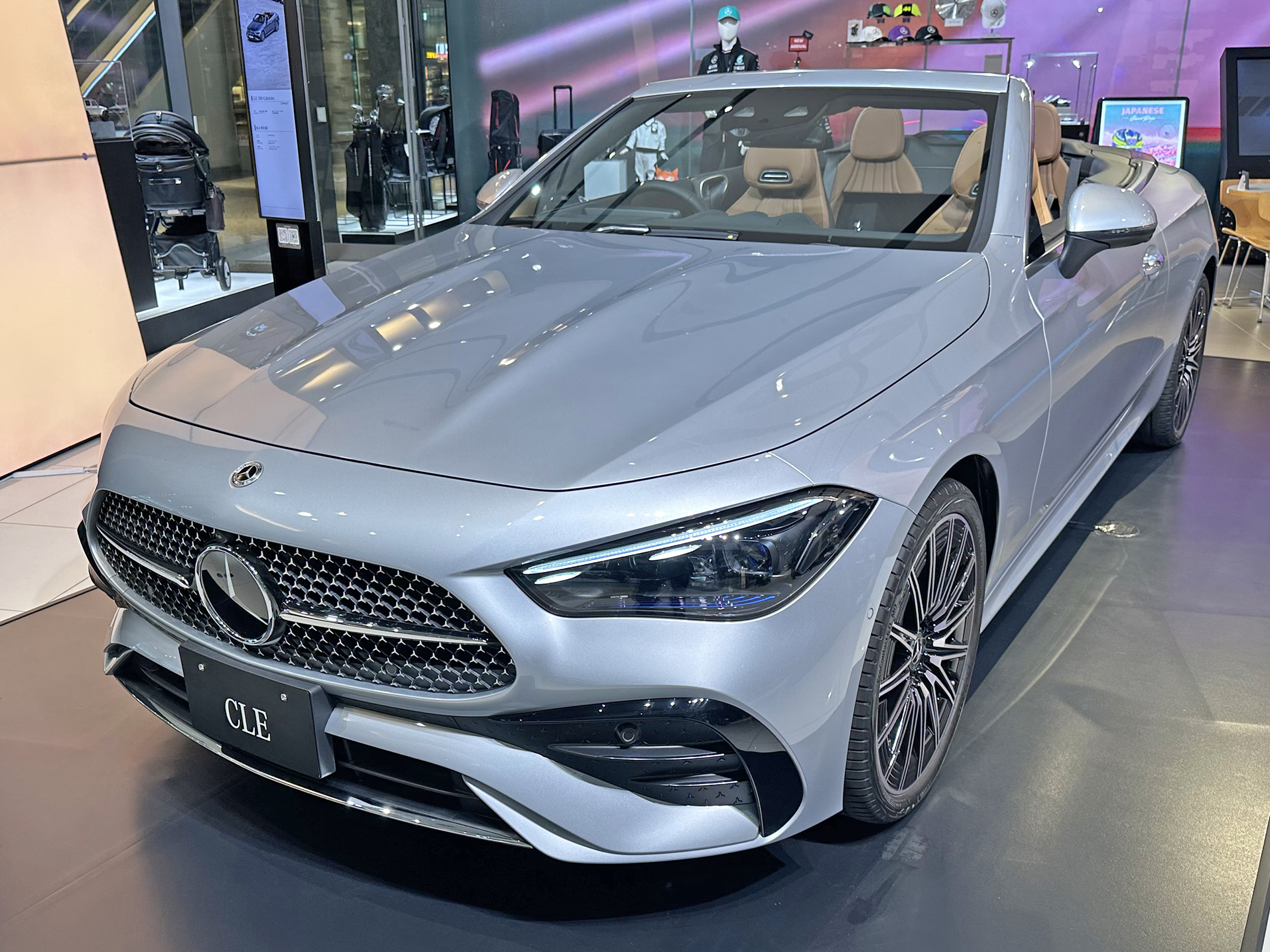
Convertible (A236)

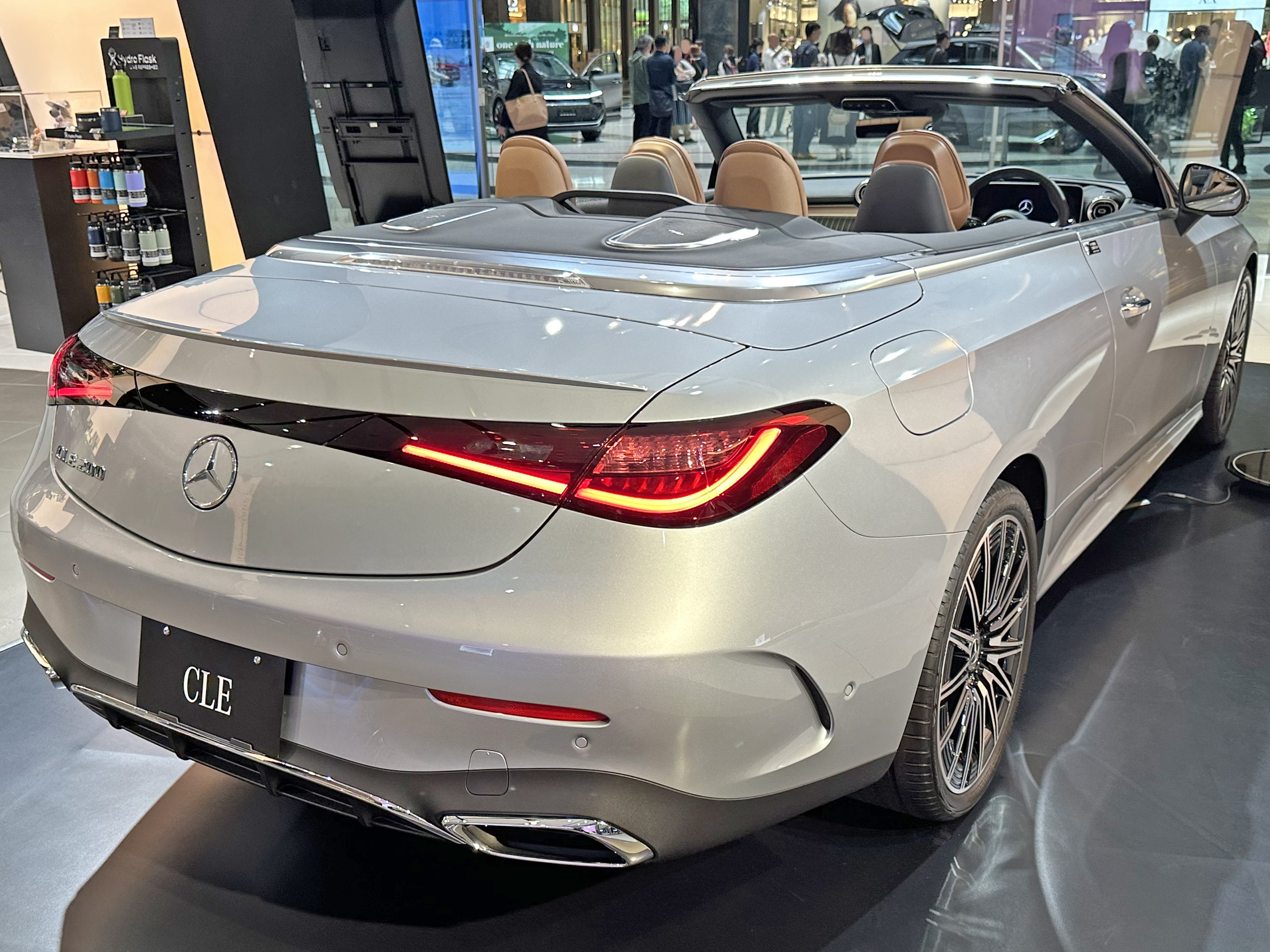
Rear view (A236)

== Mercedes-AMG models ==
=== AMG CLE 53 ===
In December 2023, Mercedes introduced the CLE 53 AMG, featuring a mild-hybrid AMG-enhanced M256 3.0-liter inline six-cylinder engine with exhaust gas turbocharger and electric auxiliary compressor, standard AMG Performance 4MATIC+ fully variable all-wheel drive and active rear-axle steering, and styling with distinctive AMG design elements and flared wheel arches. The model is also available as a Cabriolet.

The CLE 53 AMG produces 443 hp and 413 lb⋅ft (560 N⋅m) of torque (443 lb⋅ft (601 N⋅m) for 10 seconds with overboost). The 48-volt integrated starter generator (ISG) provides support at lower engine speeds with 23 hp and 151 lb-ft. Models based on it are competing in Argentina's Turismo Carretera championship.

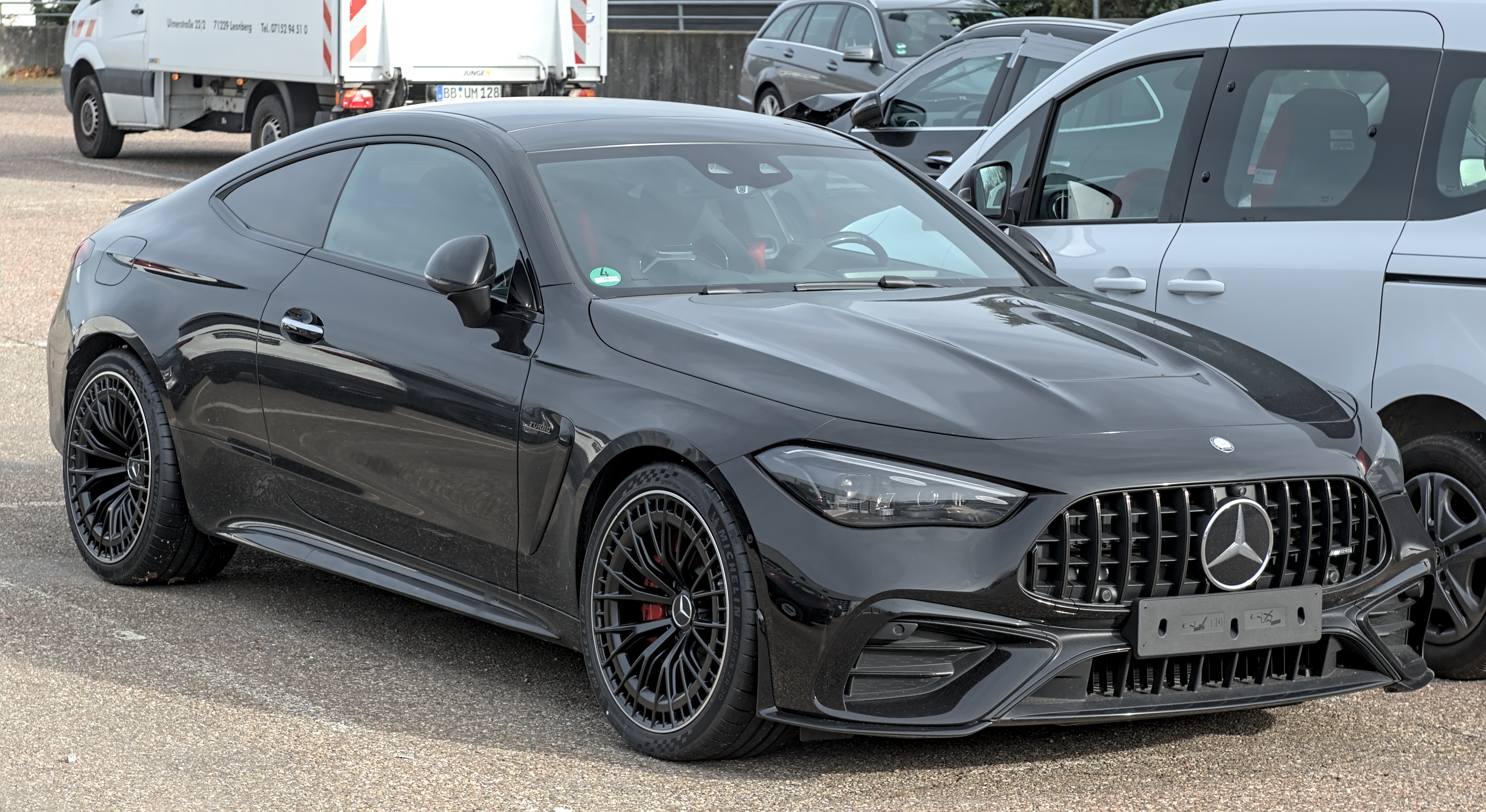
Front view (CLE 53)

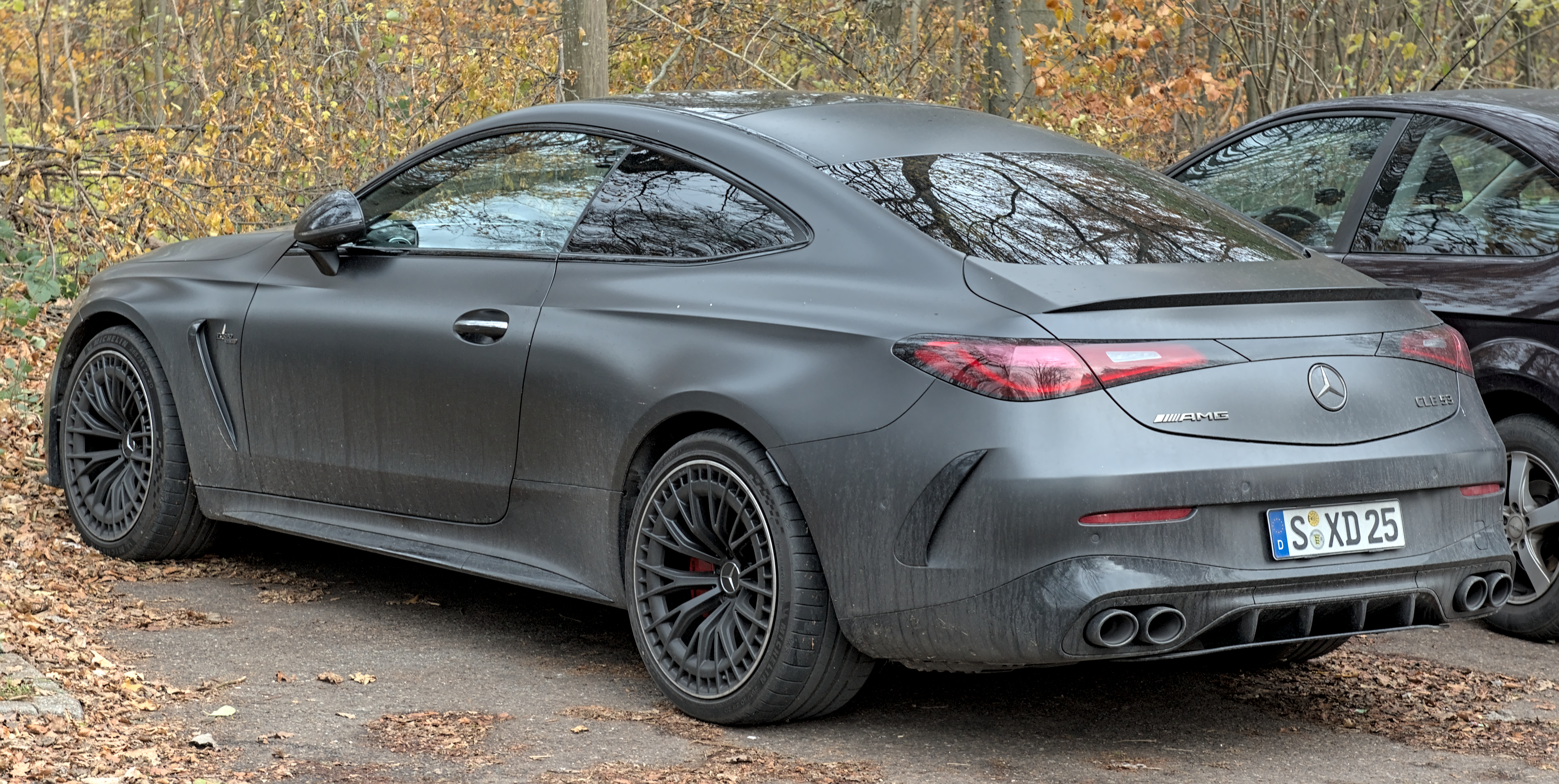
Rear view (CLE 53)

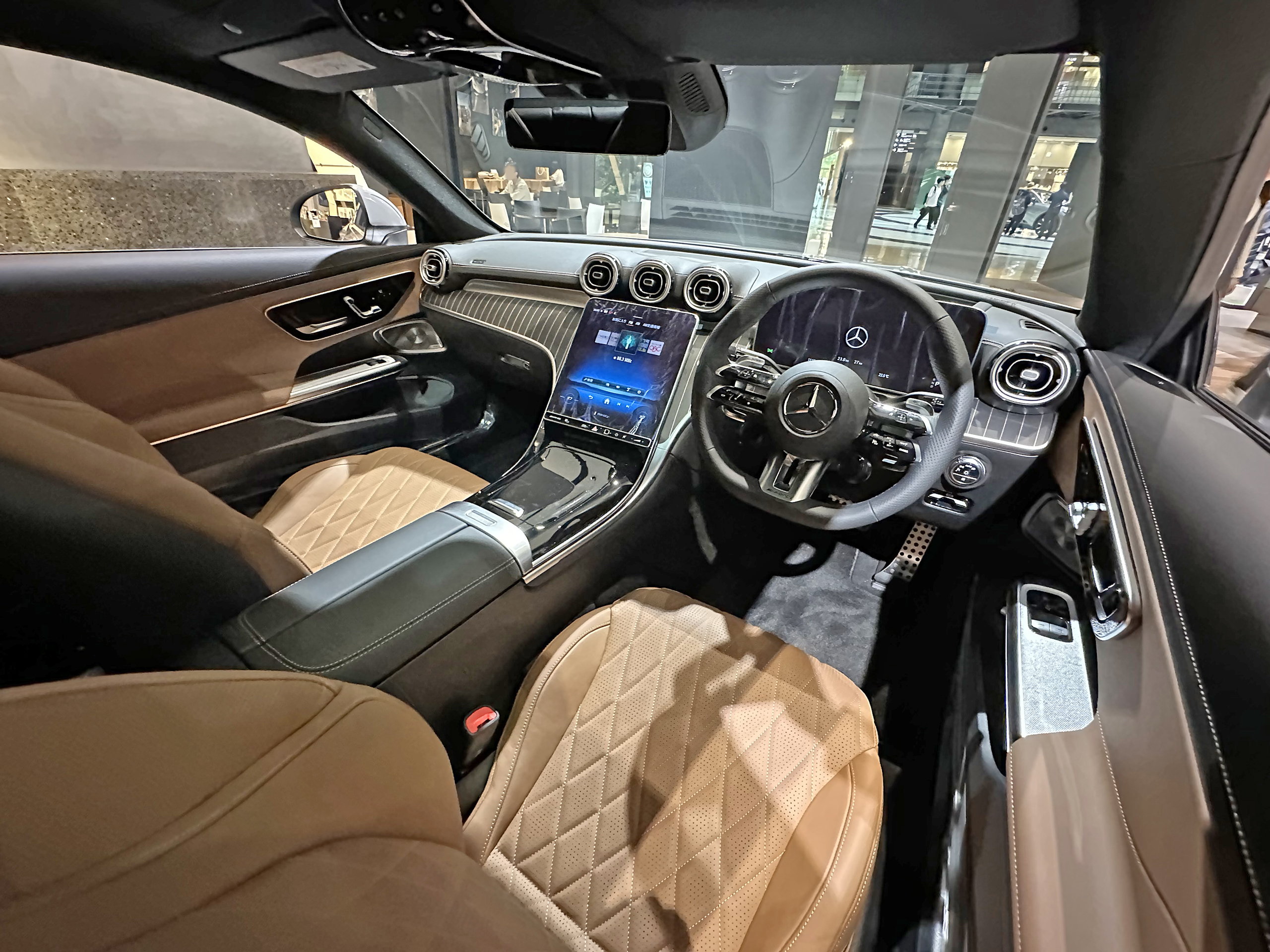
Interior

=== AMG CLE 63 ===
A Mercedes-AMG CLE 63 model is planned for 2027. The CLE 63 will use a twin-turbo V8, akin to previous generations.

=== AMG CLE 646 Spezialanfertigung ===
The Mercedes-AMG CLE 646 Spezialanfertigung (meaning "custom-made" in English) was first teased in January 2026, then officially unveiled on 10 September 2026. It is the second vehicle in Mercedes' extreme, limited-edition Mythos series, with production limited to 30 units.

It is based on the AMG CLE 53 and features redesigned front and rear fascias, as well as an increased width of 60 mm (2.4 in). Due to additional carbon fiber elements, polycarbonate rear windows and a lighter 12-volt starter battery, it weighs 375 pounds (170 kg) less than the CLE 53. The new front splitter, enlarged rear diffuser and fixed rear wing (with an adjustable middle section) combine to create over 250 kg (551 lb) of downforce at top speed.

For the interior, acoustic sound-deadening materials, certain controls on the steering wheel, as well as the rear seats have been removed to save weight. Racing bucket seats are used, with an optional six-point harness.

The AMG 646 uses a 4.0 liter twin-turbo V8 engine with a flatplane crankshaft design, producing a total of 637 horsepower (475 kW; 646 PS) and 627 lb⋅ft (850 N⋅m) of torque. Instead of the CLE 53's all wheel drive driverain, the CLE 646 uses a rear wheel drive drivetrain, allowing it to accelerate from 0-100 km/h (62 mph) in 3.9 seconds and from 0-200 km/h (124 mph) in 11.4 seconds, reaching a claimed top speed of 310 km/h (193 mph). Three separate cooling circuits are used to regulate temperature of key components, including a high-temperature circuit used for the engine, and two low-temperature circuits used for the turbochargers, transmission oil, and the 48-volt electrical system. It is also equipped with specially developed steel sprung coilover suspension with four-way adjustable dampers. Front and rear carbon ceramic brake discs with a diameter of 16.5 in (420 mm) and 14.2 in (360 mm) are used; paired with six-piston fixed calipers in the front and single-piston floating calipers in the rear. Furthermore, a distinct titanium-based exhaust system developed in collaboration with Akrapovič is used.

== Engines ==
Engines
Type	Model	Engine code	Displacement	Power	Torque	Electric motor	Trans.	Top speed	0–100 km/h (0–62 mph)	Layout	Cal. years
Petrol mild hybrid	CLE 200	M 254	1,999 cc (2.0 L) I4 turbo	201 hp (150 kW; 204 PS) @ 5,800 rpm Front motor: 23 hp (17 kW; 23 PS)	320 N⋅m (32.6 kg⋅m; 236 lb⋅ft) @ 1,600-4,000 Front motor: 200 N⋅m (20.4 kg⋅m; 148 lb⋅ft)	48V EQ Boost Mild Hybrid System	9-speed 9G-Tronic automatic	240 km/h (149 mph)	7.4 s	RWD; AWD (4Matic)	
Petrol mild hybrid	CLE 200	M 254	1,999 cc (2.0 L) I4 turbo	201 hp (150 kW; 204 PS) @ 5,800 rpm Front motor: 23 hp (17 kW; 23 PS)	320 N⋅m (32.6 kg⋅m; 236 lb⋅ft) @ 1,600-4,000 Front motor: 200 N⋅m (20.4 kg⋅m; 148 lb⋅ft)	48V EQ Boost Mild Hybrid System	9-speed 9G-Tronic automatic	240 km/h (149 mph)	7.4 s	RWD; AWD (4Matic)	2023–present
Petrol mild hybrid	CLE 300	M 254	1,999 cc (2.0 L) I4 turbo	255 hp (190 kW; 259 PS) @ 5,800 rpm Front motor: 23 hp (17 kW; 23 PS)	400 N⋅m (40.8 kg⋅m; 295 lb⋅ft) @ 2,000-3,200 Front motor: 200 N⋅m (20.4 kg⋅m; 148 lb⋅ft)	48V EQ Boost Mild Hybrid System	9-speed 9G-Tronic automatic	250 km/h (155 mph)	6.2 s	AWD (4Matic)	
Petrol mild hybrid	CLE 300	M 254	1,999 cc (2.0 L) I4 turbo	255 hp (190 kW; 259 PS) @ 5,800 rpm Front motor: 23 hp (17 kW; 23 PS)	400 N⋅m (40.8 kg⋅m; 295 lb⋅ft) @ 2,000-3,200 Front motor: 200 N⋅m (20.4 kg⋅m; 148 lb⋅ft)	48V EQ Boost Mild Hybrid System	9-speed 9G-Tronic automatic	250 km/h (155 mph)	6.2 s	AWD (4Matic)	2023–present
Petrol mild hybrid	CLE 450	M 256	2,999 cc (3.0 L) I6 turbo	375 hp (280 kW; 380 PS) @ 5,800-6,100 rpm Front motor: 23 hp (17 kW; 23 PS)	500 N⋅m (51.0 kg⋅m; 369 lb⋅ft) @ 1,800-5,000 Front motor: 200 N⋅m (20.4 kg⋅m; 148 lb⋅ft)	48V EQ Boost Mild Hybrid System	9-speed 9G-Tronic automatic	250 km/h (155 mph)	4.4 s	AWD (4Matic)	
Petrol mild hybrid	CLE 450	M 256	2,999 cc (3.0 L) I6 turbo	375 hp (280 kW; 380 PS) @ 5,800-6,100 rpm Front motor: 23 hp (17 kW; 23 PS)	500 N⋅m (51.0 kg⋅m; 369 lb⋅ft) @ 1,800-5,000 Front motor: 200 N⋅m (20.4 kg⋅m; 148 lb⋅ft)	48V EQ Boost Mild Hybrid System	9-speed 9G-Tronic automatic	250 km/h (155 mph)	4.4 s	AWD (4Matic)	2023–present
Petrol PHEV	CLE 300e	M 254	1,999 cc (2.0 L) I4 turbo	204 hp (152 kW; 207 PS) @ 5,800-6,100 rpm Front motor: 129 hp (96 kW; 131 PS)	500 N⋅m (51.0 kg⋅m; 369 lb⋅ft) @ 1,800-5,000 Front motor: 200 N⋅m (20.4 kg⋅m; 148 lb⋅ft)	Permanent magnet syncronus motor	9-speed 9G-Tronic automatic	250 km/h (155 mph)	6.3 s	RWD	
Petrol PHEV	CLE 300e	M 254	1,999 cc (2.0 L) I4 turbo	204 hp (152 kW; 207 PS) @ 5,800-6,100 rpm Front motor: 129 hp (96 kW; 131 PS)	500 N⋅m (51.0 kg⋅m; 369 lb⋅ft) @ 1,800-5,000 Front motor: 200 N⋅m (20.4 kg⋅m; 148 lb⋅ft)	Permanent magnet syncronus motor	9-speed 9G-Tronic automatic	250 km/h (155 mph)	6.3 s	RWD	2024–present
Diesel mild hybrid	CLE 220d	OM 654	1,993 cc (2.0 L) I4 turbo	197 hp (147 kW; 200 PS) @ 3,600 rpm Front motor: 23 hp (17 kW; 23 PS)	440 N⋅m (44.9 kg⋅m; 325 lb⋅ft) @ 1,800-2,800 Front motor: 200 N⋅m (20.4 kg⋅m; 148 lb⋅ft)	48V EQ Boost Mild Hybrid System	9-speed 9G-Tronic automatic	238 km/h (148 mph)	7.5 s	RWD	
Diesel mild hybrid	CLE 220d	OM 654	1,993 cc (2.0 L) I4 turbo	197 hp (147 kW; 200 PS) @ 3,600 rpm Front motor: 23 hp (17 kW; 23 PS)	440 N⋅m (44.9 kg⋅m; 325 lb⋅ft) @ 1,800-2,800 Front motor: 200 N⋅m (20.4 kg⋅m; 148 lb⋅ft)	48V EQ Boost Mild Hybrid System	9-speed 9G-Tronic automatic	238 km/h (148 mph)	7.5 s	RWD	2023–present
Petrol mild hybrid	CLE 53	M256	2,999 cc (3.0 L) I6 turbo	443 hp (330 kW; 449 PS) @ 5,800-6,100 rpm Front motor: 23 hp (17 kW; 23 PS)	600 N⋅m (61.2 kg⋅m; 443 lb⋅ft) @ 2,200-5,000 Front motor: 200 N⋅m (20.4 kg⋅m; 148 lb⋅ft)	48V EQ Boost Mild Hybrid System	9-speed 9G-Tronic automatic	250 km/h (155 mph)	4.2 s	AWD (4Matic)	
Petrol mild hybrid	CLE 53	M256	2,999 cc (3.0 L) I6 turbo	443 hp (330 kW; 449 PS) @ 5,800-6,100 rpm Front motor: 23 hp (17 kW; 23 PS)	600 N⋅m (61.2 kg⋅m; 443 lb⋅ft) @ 2,200-5,000 Front motor: 200 N⋅m (20.4 kg⋅m; 148 lb⋅ft)	48V EQ Boost Mild Hybrid System	9-speed 9G-Tronic automatic	250 km/h (155 mph)	4.2 s	AWD (4Matic)	2024–present
Petrol mild hybrid	CLE 646 Spezialanfertigung	M177 EVO	3,982 cc (4.0 L) V8 Twin-turbo	637 hp (475 kW; 646 PS) @ 5,800-6,100 rpm Front motor: 23 hp (17 kW; 23 PS)	850 N⋅m (86.7 kg⋅m; 627 lb⋅ft) @ 2,200-5,000 Front motor: 200 N⋅m (20.4 kg⋅m; 148 lb⋅ft)	48V EQ Boost Mild Hybrid System	9-speed 9G-Tronic automatic	310 km/h (193 mph)	3.9 s	RWD	
Petrol mild hybrid	CLE 646 Spezialanfertigung	M177 EVO	3,982 cc (4.0 L) V8 Twin-turbo	637 hp (475 kW; 646 PS) @ 5,800-6,100 rpm Front motor: 23 hp (17 kW; 23 PS)	850 N⋅m (86.7 kg⋅m; 627 lb⋅ft) @ 2,200-5,000 Front motor: 200 N⋅m (20.4 kg⋅m; 148 lb⋅ft)	48V EQ Boost Mild Hybrid System	9-speed 9G-Tronic automatic	310 km/h (193 mph)	3.9 s	RWD	2026–present (Limited 30 Units)

== Safety ==
Euro NCAP test results Mercedes-Benz CLE 220 d Coupé (LHD) (2025)
Test	Points	%
Overall:	5 /5 stars	
Adult occupant:	37.4	93%
Child occupant:	44.0	89%
Pedestrian:	55.3	87%
Safety assist:	15.0	83%

ANCAP test results Mercedes-Benz CLE Coupe (2025, aligned with Euro NCAP)
Test	Points	%
Overall:	5 /5 stars	
Adult occupant:	37.38	93%
Child occupant:	42.43	86%
Pedestrian:	55.27	87%
Safety assist:	15.24	84%
