= Mercedes-Benz E-Class (W214) =

Sixth generation of Mercedes-Benz E-Class

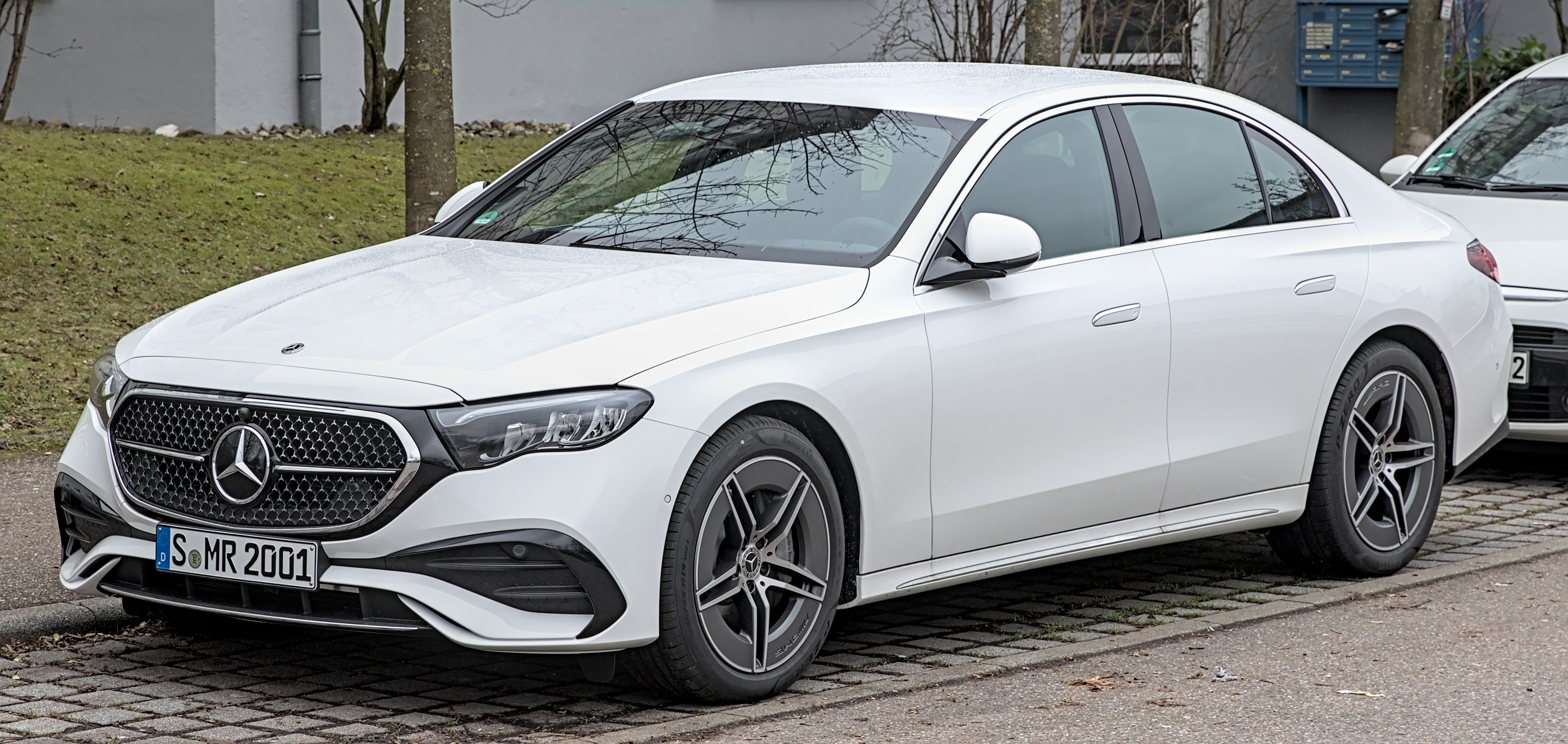

Overview
- Manufacturer: Mercedes-Benz Group
- Model code: W214 (Saloon); V214 (LWB); S214 (Wagon); X214 (All Terrain)
- Production: May 2023 – present
- Model years: 2024–present
- Assembly: Germany: Sindelfingen; China: Beijing (Beijing Benz, for V214 models); India: Chakan, Pune (Mercedes-Benz India); Indonesia: Bogor (Inchcape Indomobil); Malaysia: Pekan (HICOM); Thailand: Samut Prakan (TAAP); Vietnam: Ho Chi Minh City (MBV)
- Designer: Gorden Wagener (design director); Michael Frei; Robert Lešnik; Bastian Baudy (sketch); Torben Ewe (light design); Andreas Franke (interior design)

Body and chassis
- Class: Executive car (E)
- Body style: 4-door saloon 5-door estate
- Platform: MRA2
- Related: Mercedes-Benz C-Class (W206); Mercedes-Benz S-Class (W223); Mercedes-Benz CLE (C236/A236)

Powertrain
- Engine: Petrol mild hybrid: 2.0 L M 254 turbo I4; 3.0 L M 256 turbo I6; Petrol plug-in hybrid: 2.0 L M 254 turbo I4; 3.0 L M 256 turbo I6; Diesel mild hybrid; 2.0 L OM 654 turbo I4; 3.0 L OM 656 turbo I6; Diesel plug-in hybrid; 2.0 L OM 654 turbo I4
- Electric motor: 48 V integrated starter-generator (mild hybrid); Permanent-magnet synchronous (plug-in hybrid)
- Transmission: 9-speed automatic (9G-Tronic)
- Hybrid drivetrain: Mild hybrid; Plug-in hybrid (E 300e, E 300de, E 400e, E 53 Hybrid+)
- Battery: 48 V lithium-ion (MHEV); 25.4 kWh lithium-ion (PHEV)

Dimensions
- Wheelbase: 2,961 mm (116.6 in)
- Length: 4,949 mm (194.8 in)
- Width: 1,880 mm (74 in)
- Height: 1,480 mm (58 in)
- Curb weight: 1,825–2,265 kg (4,023–4,993 lb)

Chronology
- Predecessor: Mercedes-Benz E-Class (W213)

The sixth generation of the Mercedes-Benz E-Class executive car is a lineup consisting of three body styles, the W214 sedan, S214 estate, and the X214 all terrain estate, which are vehicles produced by German luxury vehicle manufacturer Mercedes-Benz Group since 2 May 2023. Available exclusively in mild hybrid and plug-in hybrid variants, the E-Class has been available since August 2023 in the UK. Estate variants will come in December 2023. Models years for all body styles are to start in 2024.

As with the last generation, the W214 will receive a long-wheel base model internally designated V214 replacing the V213, assembled and sold locally at the Beijing Benz factory in Beijing, China.

== Development and launch ==
Built upon the rear-wheel drive based MRA II (Modular Rear Architecture) platform which it shares with the D-segment W206 C-Class and the F-segment W223 S-Class, the W214 was unveiled on 25 April 2023. At 26 mm (1.0 in) longer, 28 mm (1.1 in) wider, and 12 mm (0.47 in) taller, it has grown in every dimension compared to the previous model. Its wheel base has grown by 22 mm (0.87 in). For the E-Class Coupé and Cabriolet, the vehicle has undergone a nomenclature update, using the CLE nameplate.

For the estate model, its size in length, width and height has increased by 4 mm (0.16 in), 28 mm (1.1 in), and 22 mm (0.87 in), respectively, while its wheelbase has increased by 22 mm (0.87 in). Boot space has increased by 10 mm (0.39 in).

Designed under the direction of Gorden Wagener and debuting the Design Language 4.0, the E-Class was sketched by Bastian Baudy, Micheal Frei, and Robert Lešnik, while Torben Ewe designed the lights and Andreas Franke had designed the interior. As of Q4 2023, available model configurations are petrol mild hybrid, petrol plug-in hybrid, diesel mild hybrid, and diesel plug-in hybrid.

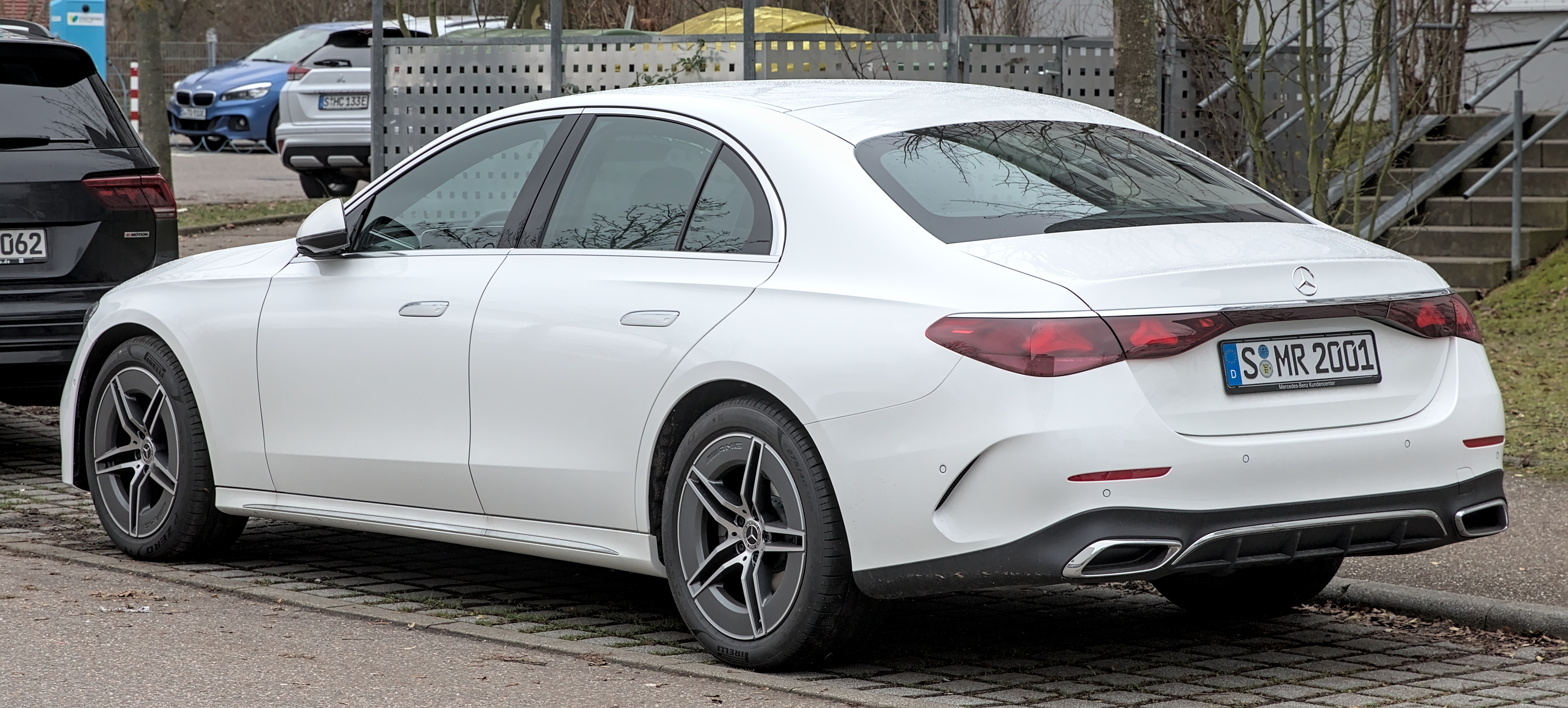
Rear view (W214)

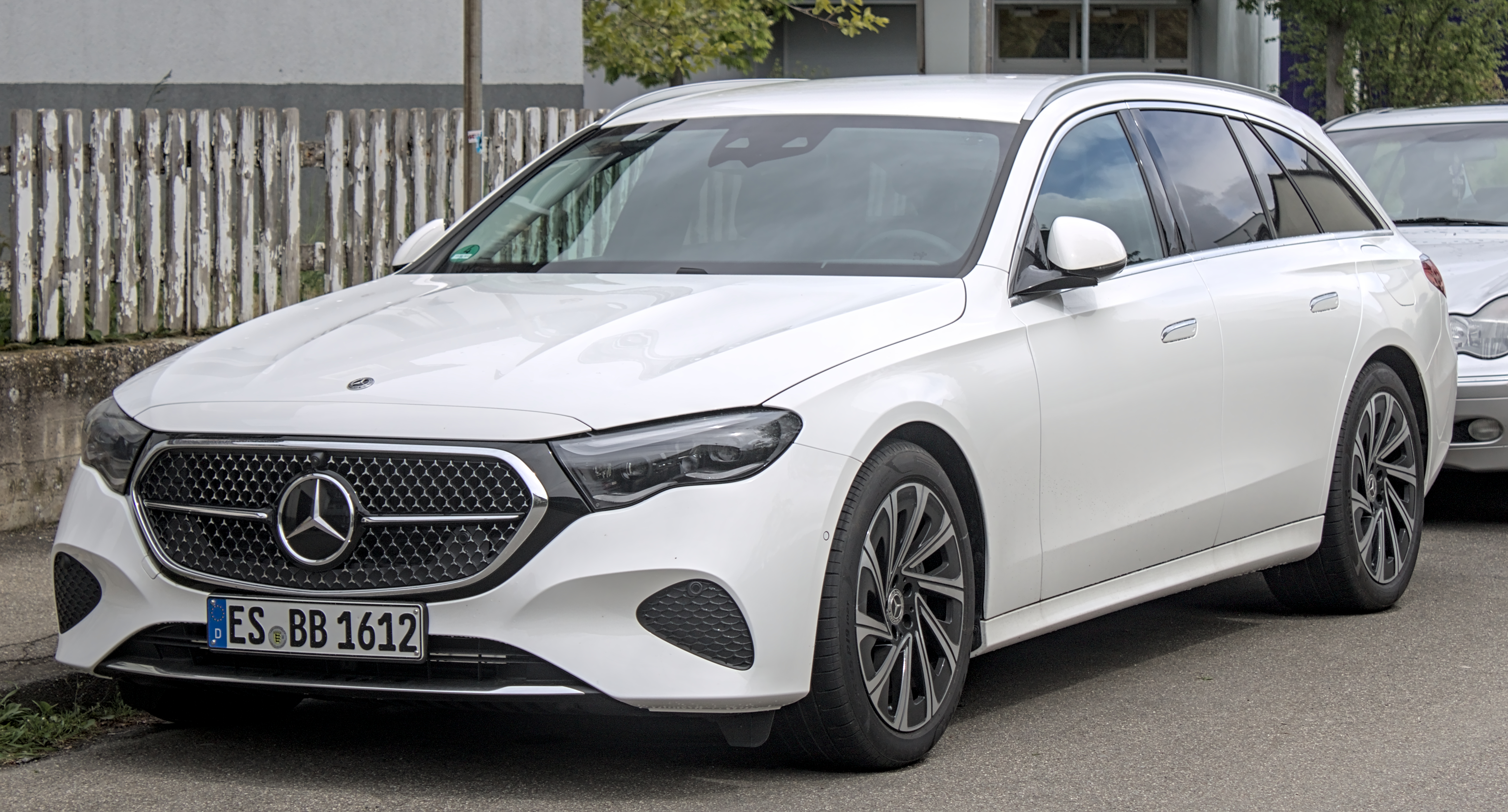
Mercedes-Benz E220d (S214)

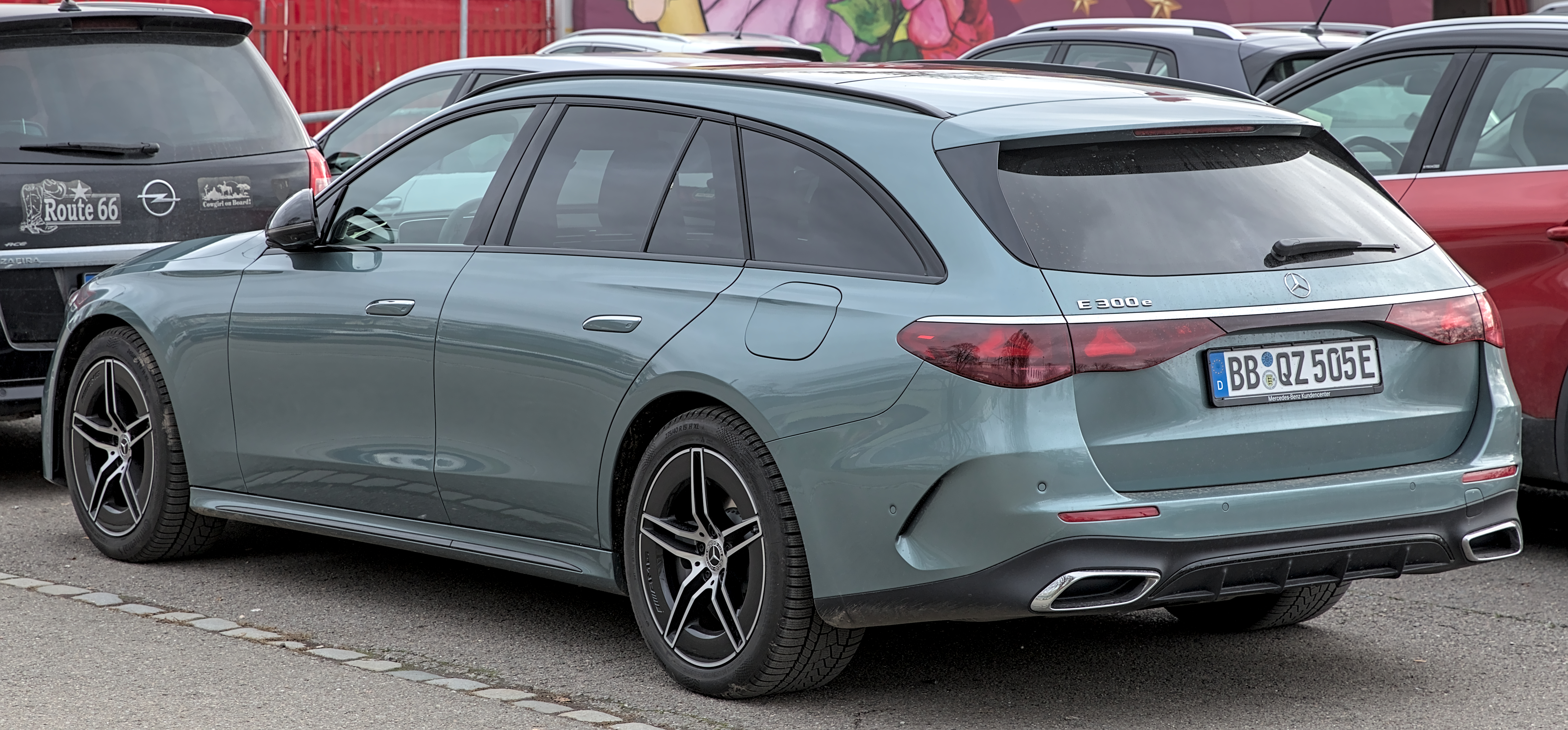
Rear view (S214)

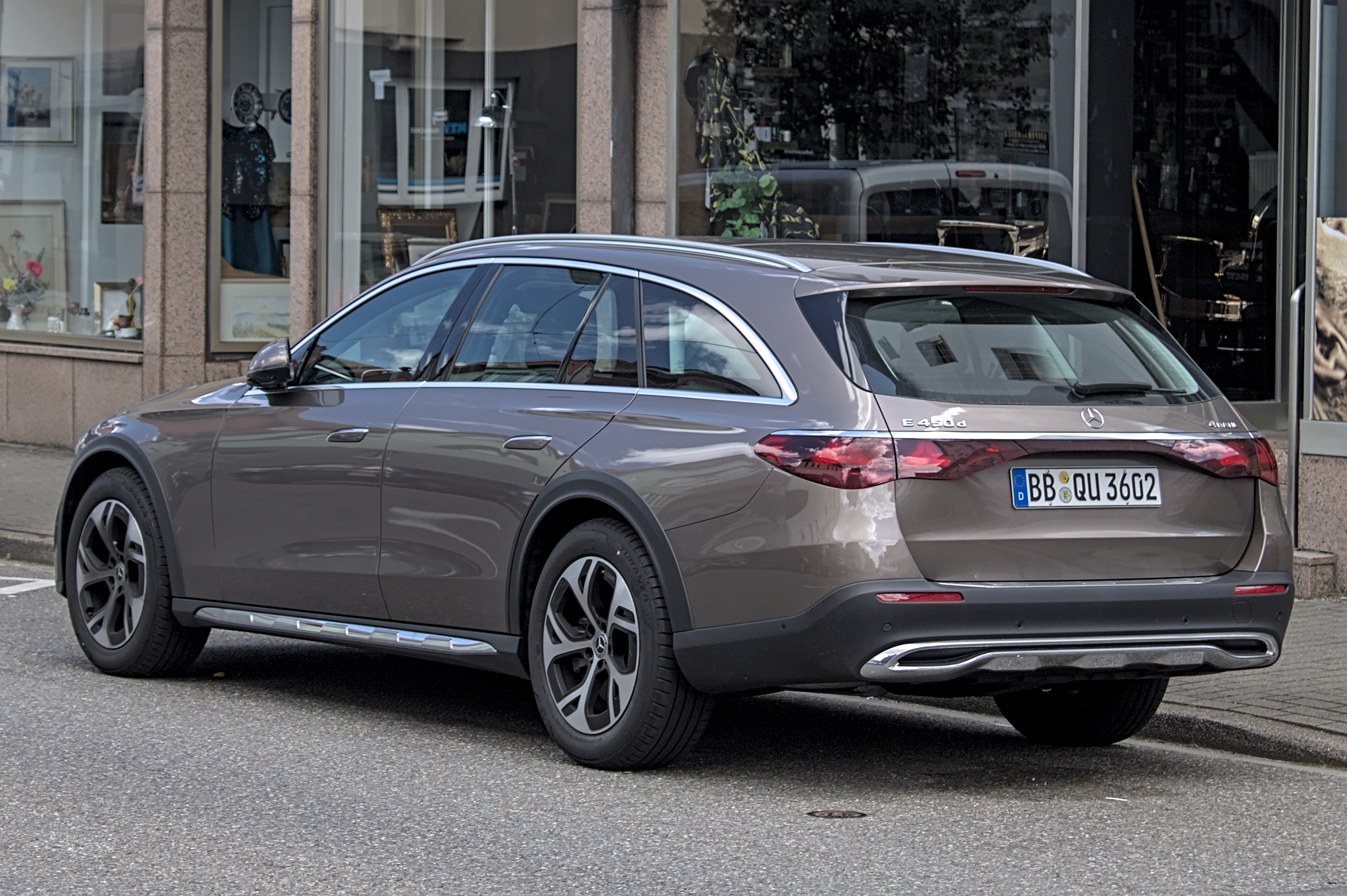
Rear view (X214)

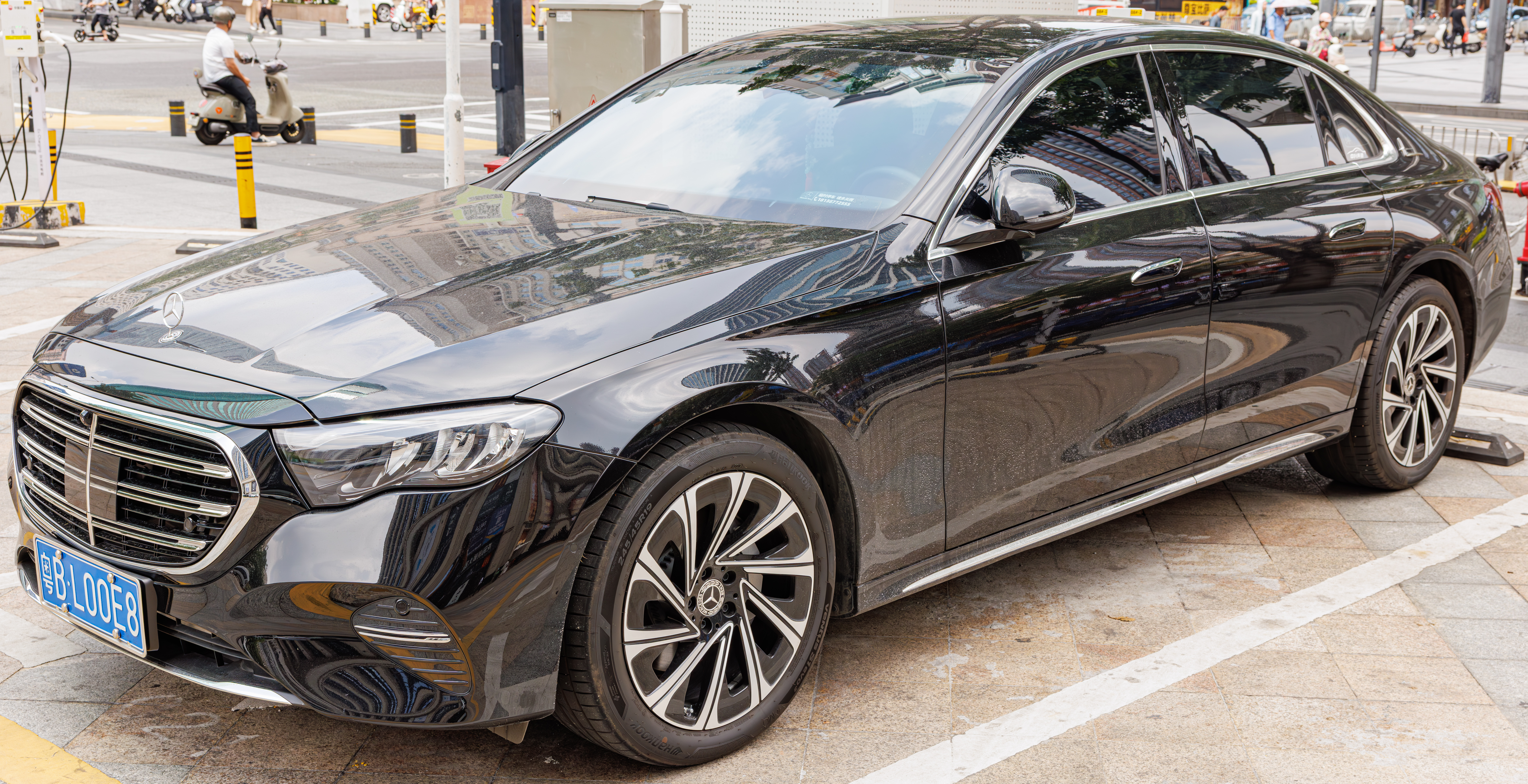
Mercedes-Benz E300 L (V214, China)

Rear view (V214, China)

== Specifications ==
=== Design and chassis ===
The W214 features a four-arm multi-link suspension setup at the front, while a five-link setup is positioned at the rear with Agility Control steel-sprung suspension and adjustable damping, which is standard on the mild hybrids. Ride height for plug-in hybrids is lowered by 15 mm (0.59 in). Air suspension is optional, as part of the Technology package, which adds Airmatic with continuously variable damping. Rear-wheel steering is optional, which now supports steering of up to 4.5 degrees, reducing the vehicle's turning circle by 90 cm. For RWD models, the turning circle is 10.8 m, and 11.1 m for AWD models. All-wheel steering is also available. For the saloon model, its boot capacity is 540 litres (19 cu ft), though for the estate model boot space increases to 615 litres (21.7 cu ft). With rear seats folded, boot space expands to 1,675 litres (59.2 cu ft) on the estate.

The vehicle's basis for chassis and bodywork is the rear-wheel drive based, Mercedes-Benz Modular Rear Architecture, a platform dedicated to making unibody-based vehicles that use either a mild hybrid or plug-in hybrid powertrain. Like other vehicles in this platform, the W214 combines high-strength steel and with aluminium.

The vehicle retains its drag coefficient of 0.23 C_{d}, which would not have been possible if not for its headlights, which are joined by a black panel that connects the grille.

=== Exterior ===
Retaining its three-box sedan shape, the front fascia features a black high-gloss insert in between the headlights and grille, which was inspired by the EQ range. According to the brand, the headlights are made to resemble eyebrows. Flush-fitting door handles, as seen on the EQE, EQS and S-Class are available. The taillights feature a three-pointed star motif design.

Eleven colour options, consisting of Black, Polar White, Obsidian Black metallic, Graphite Gray metallic, Mojave Silver metallic, Lunar Blue metallic, Cirrus Silver metallic, Selenite Gray metallic, Cardinal Red metallic, Diamond White metallic, and Selenite Gray metallic are available.

=== Features ===
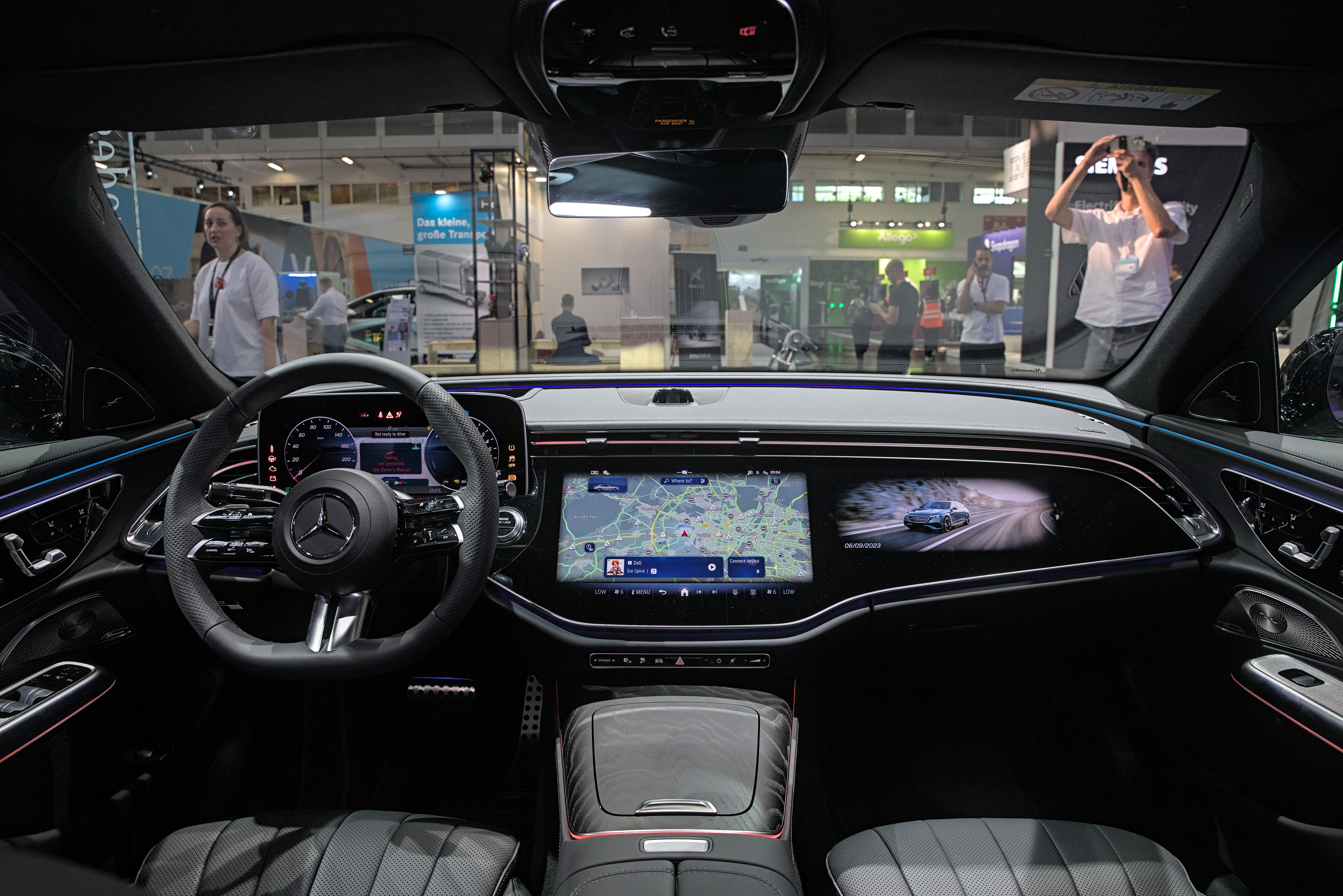
Interior

The W214 is the first Mercedes-Benz non-EQ vehicle to utilize the MBUX Superscreen, a tri-screen setup which pairs dual-12.3 in (310 mm) screens with a 17.7 in (450 mm) screen to make what looks like a large screen. The Superscreen features a selfie camera and is able to stream third-party apps such as Angry Birds, TikTok, Vivaldi, and Zoom. Additionally, if the driver looks at the screen, the device will automatically decrease its brightness. Active Ambient Lighting features a range of colours and brightnesses. Because of the 23 mm size increase, kneeroom and legroom are increased by 10 mm (0.39 in) and 17 mm (0.67 in), respectively.

Standard features include 17- to 18-inch wheels, electrically folding mirrors and dimming rear view mirrors. The KEYLESS-GO smart key function, LED headlamps including integral LED daytime running lamps and Adaptive Highbeam Assist system, a 12.3-inch digital instrument cluster (upgradable to the Superscreen), and privacy glass for rear side windows and rear windscreen. The advanced driver-assistance features include Active Distance Assist, Active Brake Assist, Active Lane Keeping Assist, Parking Package that comes with a 180-degree camera, Park Assist, and Parktronic, and Speed Limit Assist. Attention Assist features a distraction system. This system and will warn the driver both visually and by audio. The car will initiate an emergency stop via the Active Emergency Stop Assist function. 64 ambience colours are optional, and a wireless charging pad for smartphones is available.

Standard models receive the Thermatic two-zone air conditioning system, however, the Thermotronic package is available with higher-end models. Other optional features include 19-, 20, or 21-inch wheels, Mercedes’ DIGITAL LIGHT system, head-up display, illuminated grille, and summer tyres.

Mercedes says the hybrid system reduces turbo lag and smoothens the automatic start-stop system.

== Powertrain ==
The W214 E-Class is primarily available with 2.0 litre four cylinder engines with 48 V mild hybrid technology with an integrated starter-generator, located between the transmission and the crankshaft. There are also plug-in hybrid variants which all use a 25.4 kWh lithium-ion battery. Only the range-topping E450 is available with the 3.0 litre six-cylinder engine.

=== Plug-in hybrids ===
The E300e PHEV model's all-electric range is 96–115 km (60–71 mi) depending on either trim or model. The E400e PHEV's all electric range is 97–109 km (60–68 mi). For both models, the fully electric modes let the driver cruise below speeds of 130 km/h (81 mph).

| Model | Engine | | | | | Motor | | Combined system output | Trans. | Battery | Layout | Cal. years |
| Model | Type | Code | Displ. | Power | Torque | Power | Torque | Combined system output | Trans. | Battery | Layout | Cal. years |
|---|---|---|---|---|---|---|---|---|---|---|---|---|
| E 200 | Petrol mild hybrid | M 254 | 1,999 cc (2.0 L) I4 | 204 hp (152 kW; 207 PS) @ 5,800 rpm | 320 N⋅m (32.6 kg⋅m; 236 lb⋅ft) @ 1,600-4,000 rpm | 23 hp (17 kW; 23 PS) | 205 N⋅m (20.9 kg⋅m; 151 lb⋅ft) | | 9G-Tronic 9-speed automatic | 48V lithium-ion | RWD | 2023–present |
| E 350 / E 300 | Petrol mild hybrid | M 254 | 1,999 cc (2.0 L) I4 | 258 hp (192 kW; 262 PS) @ 5,800 rpm | 400 N⋅m (40.8 kg⋅m; 295 lb⋅ft) @ 2,000-3,200 rpm | 23 hp (17 kW; 23 PS) | 205 N⋅m (20.9 kg⋅m; 151 lb⋅ft) | | 9G-Tronic 9-speed automatic | 48V lithium-ion | RWD / AWD | 2023–present |
| E 450 | Petrol mild hybrid | M 256 | 2,999 cc (3.0 L) I6 turbo | 381 hp (284 kW; 386 PS) @ 5,800-6,100 rpm | 500 N⋅m (51.0 kg⋅m; 369 lb⋅ft) @ 1,800-5,000 rpm | 23 hp (17 kW; 23 PS) | 205 N⋅m (20.9 kg⋅m; 151 lb⋅ft) | | 9G-Tronic 9-speed automatic | 48V lithium-ion | AWD | 2023–present |
| E 300e / E 350e | Petrol plug-in hybrid | M 254 | 1,999 cc (2.0 L) I4 | 204 hp (152 kW; 207 PS) @ 6,100 rpm | 320 N⋅m (32.6 kg⋅m; 236 lb⋅ft) @ 2,000-4,000 rpm | 129 hp (96 kW; 131 PS) | 440 N⋅m (44.9 kg⋅m; 325 lb⋅ft) | 313 hp (233 kW; 317 PS) / 550 N⋅m (56.1 kg⋅m; 406 lb⋅ft) | 9G-Tronic 9-speed automatic | 25.4 kWh lithium-ion | RWD / AWD | 2023–present |
| E 400e | Petrol plug-in hybrid | M 254 | 1,999 cc (2.0 L) I4 | 252 hp (188 kW; 255 PS) @ 5,800 rpm | 400 N⋅m (40.8 kg⋅m; 295 lb⋅ft) @ 3,200-4,000 rpm | 129 hp (96 kW; 131 PS) | 440 N⋅m (44.9 kg⋅m; 325 lb⋅ft) | 381 hp (284 kW; 386 PS) / 650 N⋅m (66.3 kg⋅m; 479 lb⋅ft) | 9G-Tronic 9-speed automatic | 25.4 kWh lithium-ion | AWD | 2023–present |
| E 53 HYBRID 4MATIC+ | Petrol plug-in hybrid | M 256 | 2,999 cc (3.0 L) I6 | 443 hp (330 kW; 449 PS) @ 5,800 rpm | 560 N⋅m (57.1 kg⋅m; 413 lb⋅ft) @ 3,200-4,000 rpm | 161 hp (120 kW; 163 PS) | 480 N⋅m (48.9 kg⋅m; 354 lb⋅ft) | 604 hp (450 kW; 612 PS) / 750 N⋅m (76.5 kg⋅m; 553 lb⋅ft) | 9G-Tronic 9-speed automatic | | AWD | 2024–present |
| E 220d | Diesel mild hybrid | OM 654 | 1,993 cc (2.0 L) I4 | 197 hp (147 kW; 200 PS) @ 3,600 rpm | 440 N⋅m (44.9 kg⋅m; 325 lb⋅ft) @ 1,800-2,800 rpm | 23 hp (17 kW; 23 PS) | 205 N⋅m (20.9 kg⋅m; 151 lb⋅ft) | | 9G-Tronic 9-speed automatic | 48V lithium-ion | RWD / AWD | 2023–present |
| E 450d | Diesel mild hybrid | OM 656 | 2,989 cc (3.0 L) I6 | 367 hp (274 kW; 372 PS) @ 4,000 rpm | 750 N⋅m (76.5 kg⋅m; 553 lb⋅ft) @ 1,350-2,800 rpm | 23 hp (17 kW; 23 PS) | 205 N⋅m (20.9 kg⋅m; 151 lb⋅ft) | | 9G-Tronic 9-speed automatic | 48V lithium-ion | AWD | 2023–present |
| E 300de | Diesel plug-in hybrid | OM 654 | 1,993 cc (2.0 L) I4 | 197 hp (147 kW; 200 PS) | 440 N⋅m (44.9 kg⋅m; 325 lb⋅ft) | 129 hp (96 kW; 131 PS) | 440 N⋅m (44.9 kg⋅m; 325 lb⋅ft) | 313 hp (233 kW; 317 PS) / 700 N⋅m (71.4 kg⋅m; 516 lb⋅ft) | 9G-Tronic 9-speed automatic | 25.4 kWh lithium-ion | AWD | 2023–present |

== Safety ==
Euro NCAP test results Mercedes-Benz E300de (LHD) (2024)
| Test | Points | % |
|---|---|---|
| Overall: | 5 /5 stars | |
| Adult occupant: | 37.1 | 92% |
| Child occupant: | 44.2 | 90% |
| Pedestrian: | 53.2 | 84% |
| Safety assist: | 15.8 | 87% |

ANCAP test results Mercedes-Benz E-Class all variants excluding AMG (see ANCAP Technical Report) (2024, aligned with Euro NCAP)
| Test | Points | % |
|---|---|---|
| Overall: | 5 /5 stars | |
| Adult occupant: | 37.09 | 92% |
| Child occupant: | 45.06 | 91% |
| Pedestrian: | 53.21 | 84% |
| Safety assist: | 15.97 | 88% |
