= Mercedes-Benz C-Class (W205) =

Fourth generation of Mercedes-Benz C-Class

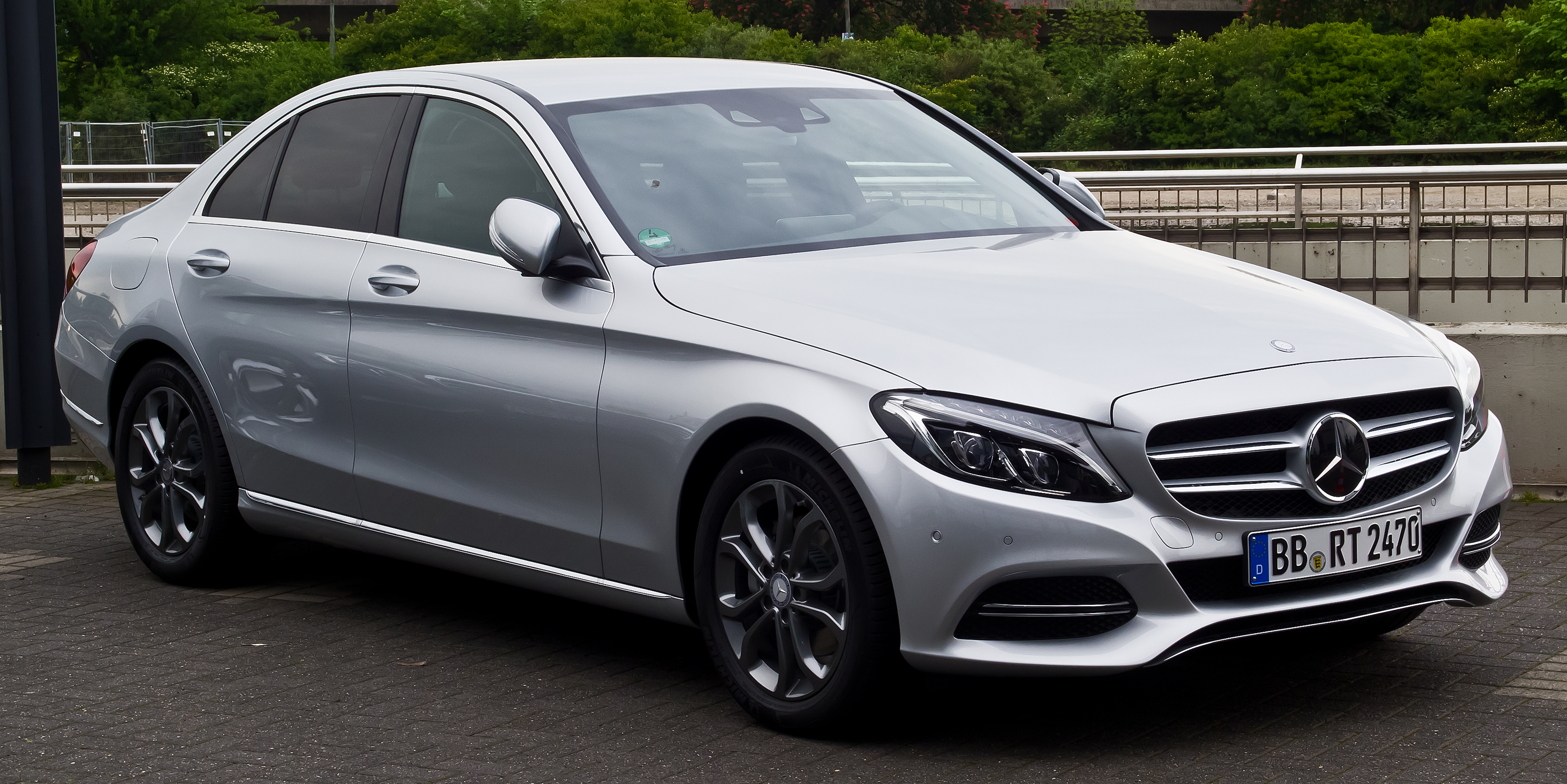
- Mercedes-Benz C 200 sedan (pre-facelift)

Overview
- Manufacturer: Daimler AG
- Model code: W205 (sedan); S205 (station wagon / estate); C205 (coupé); A205 (cabriolet); V205 (long-wheelbase sedan)
- Production: February 2014 – June 2021; 2016–2023 (coupé and cabriolet)
- Model years: 2015–2021; 2017–2023 (coupé and cabriolet)
- Assembly: Germany: Bremen; United States: Tuscaloosa, Alabama (MBUSI); South Africa: East London; Brazil: Iracemápolis; India: Pune (MBI); China: Beijing (Beijing Benz); Malaysia: Pekan (HICOM); Thailand: Samut Prakan (TAAP); Indonesia: Bogor (MBDI); Vietnam: Ho Chi Minh City (MBV)
- Designer: Volker Leutz (exterior: 2010); Robert Lešnik (design manager: 2010, 2011); Michele Jauch-Paganetti (interior: 2011)

Body and chassis
- Class: Compact executive car (D)
- Body style: 4-door sedan 5-door station wagon 2-door convertible 2-door coupé
- Layout: Front-engine, rear-wheel-drive or all-wheel-drive (4Matic)
- Platform: MRA
- Related: Mercedes-Benz GLC-Class (X253/C253); Mercedes-Benz E-Class Coupé/Cabriolet (C238/A238)

Powertrain
- Engine: Petrol: 1.5 L M264 turbo I4; 1.6 L M270 turbo I4; 2.0 L M274 turbo I4; 3.0 L AMG M276 twin-turbo V6; 4.0 L AMG M177 twin-turbo V8; Petrol hybrid: 1.5 L M264 MHEV turbo (EQ Boost) I4; 2.0 L M139 MHEV turbo (EQ Boost) I4; 2.0 L M264 MHEV turbo (EQ Boost) I4; 2.0 L M274 PHEV turbo I4; Diesel: 2.1 L OM651 BlueTEC I4 (turbo); 1.6 L Renault OM626 BlueTEC I4 (turbo); 1.6–2.0 L OM654 I4 (turbo); Diesel hybrid: 2.0 L OM654 I4 PHEV (turbo)
- Electric motor: 27 hp (20.1 kW) 120-volt compact electric motor (BlueTEC HYBRID); 16 kW (21.5 hp) BorgWarner 48V eBooster Electric Starter-Generator Motor (EQ Boost); 65 kW (87.2 hp) Schaeffler PSM P2 Hybrid Module High Voltage (C350 e); 122 PS (120.3 hp; 89.7 kW) Schaeffler PSM P2 Hybrid Module High Voltage (C300 e/C300 de)
- Transmission: 6-speed manual 7-speed 7G-Tronic Plus automatic (2014–2018); 9-speed 9G-Tronic Plus automatic
- Hybrid drivetrain: Parallel hybrid (C300 Bluetec Hybrid); Mild hybrid (EQ Boost); Plug-in hybrid (C350 e/C300 e/C300 de)
- Battery: 0.8 kWh lithium-ion (Bluetec Hybrid); 6.2 kWh lithium-ion (C350e); 13.5 kWh lithium-ion (C300e/C300de)

Dimensions
- Wheelbase: 2,840 mm (111.8 in); 2,920 mm (115.0 in) (LWB)
- Length: 4,686 mm (184.5 in); 4,746 mm (186.9 in) (V205 LWB); 4,702 mm (185.1 in) (estate); 4,688 mm (184.6 in) (coupé); 4,754 mm (187.2 in) (C63 Coupé); 4,758 mm (187.3 in) (C63 sedan)
- Width: 1,810 mm (71.3 in)
- Height: 1,442 mm (56.8 in); 1,457 mm (57.4 in) (estate)

Chronology
- Predecessor: Mercedes-Benz C-Class (W204)
- Successor: Mercedes-Benz C-Class (W206); Mercedes-Benz CLE-Class (coupé and cabriolet)

The Mercedes-Benz W205 is the fourth generation of the Mercedes-Benz C-Class which was produced by Daimler AG between 2014 and 2021. The W205 C-Class was preceded by the W204 C-Class and superseded by the W206 C-Class. The fourth-generation C-Class was available in sedan (W205), station wagon/estate (S205), coupe (C205), cabriolet (A205) and long-wheelbase sedan (V205) body styles.

The W205 was the first vehicle to use the all-new Modular Rear Architecture (MRA) platform. The new structure is significantly lighter, using aluminum extensively throughout the body, resulting in a 100 kg (220 lb) weight decrease. According to Mercedes-Benz, the structure is much more rigid than other vehicles in its class.

== Development and launch ==
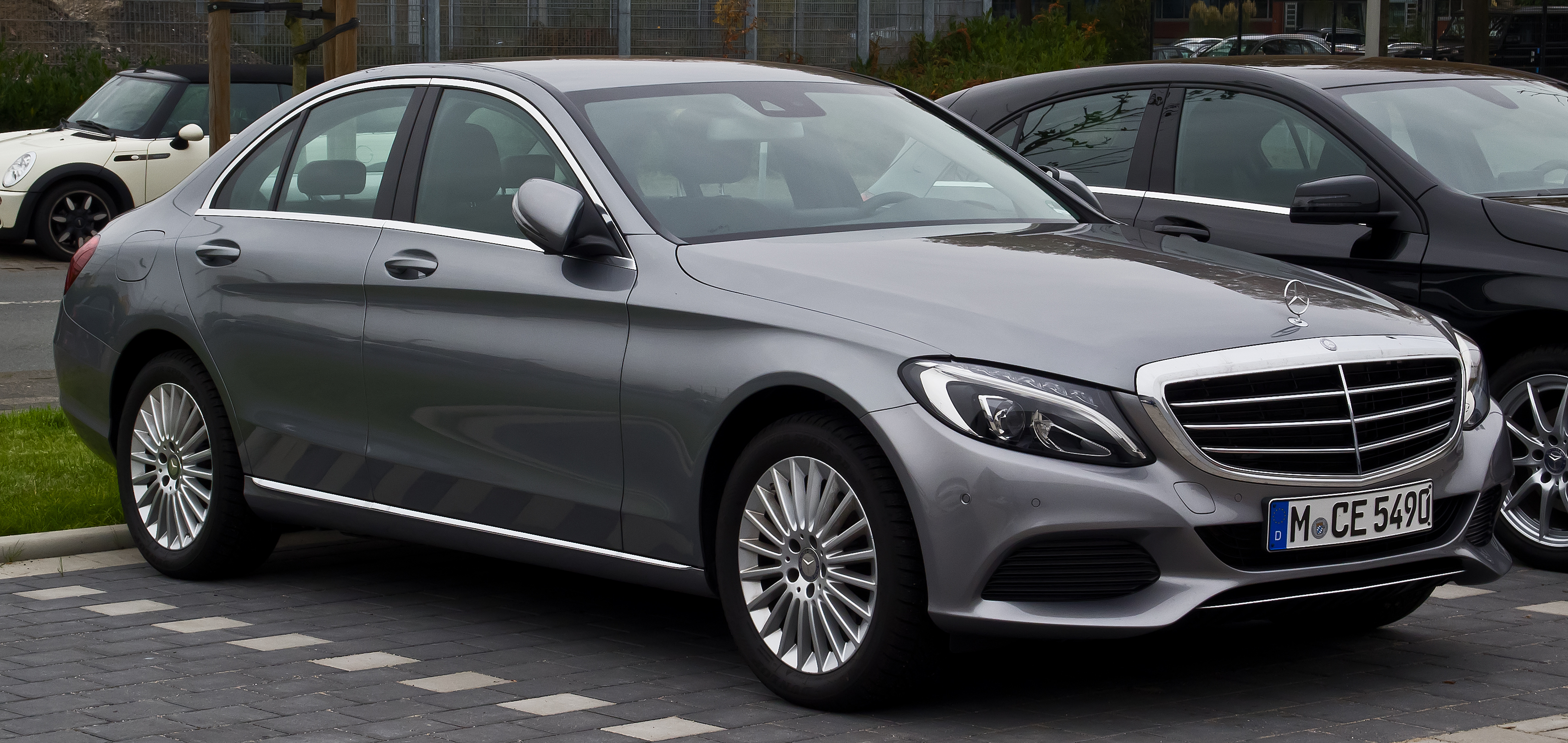
W205 Exclusive sedan (pre-facelift)

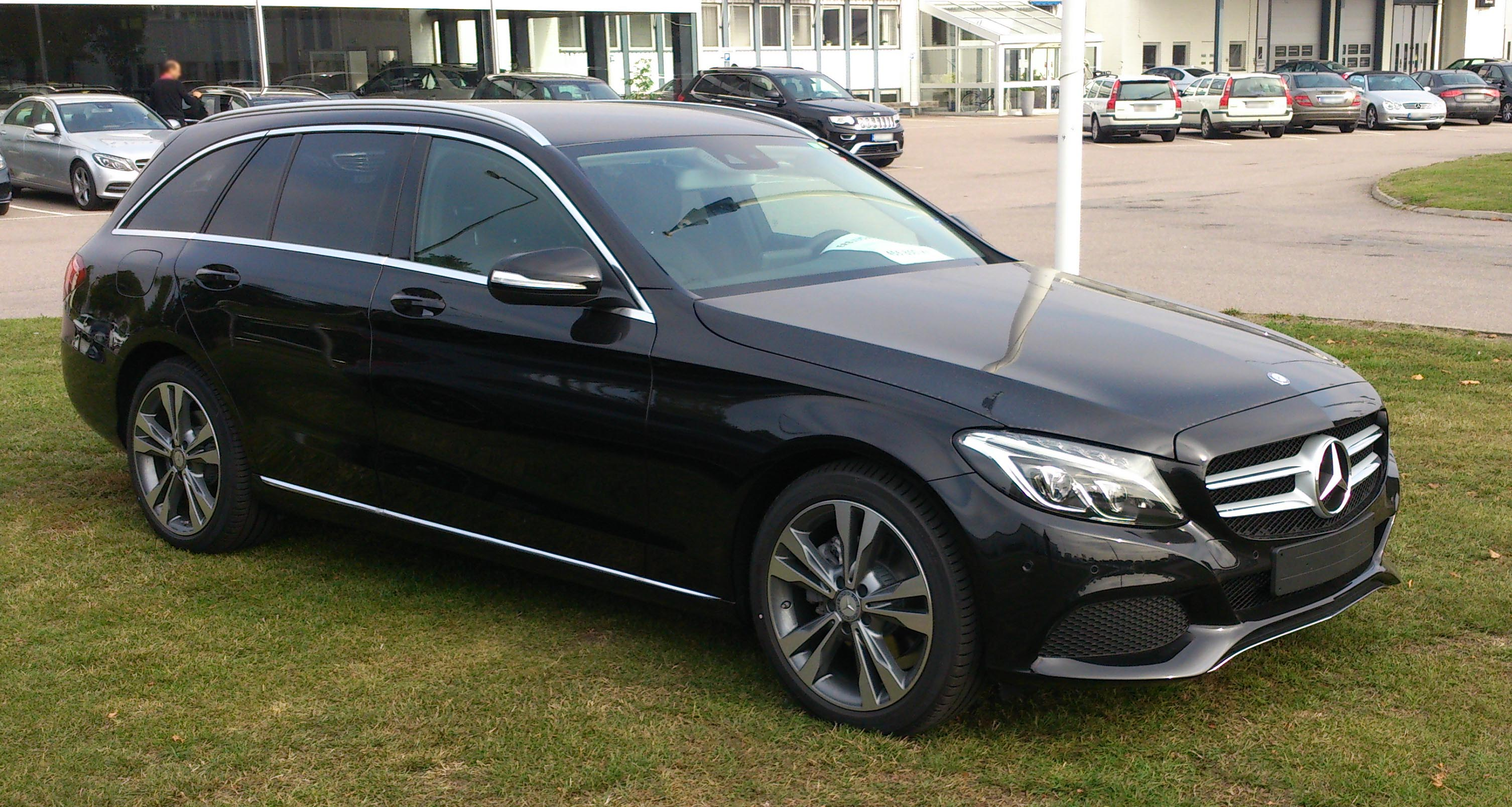
S205 (pre-facelift)

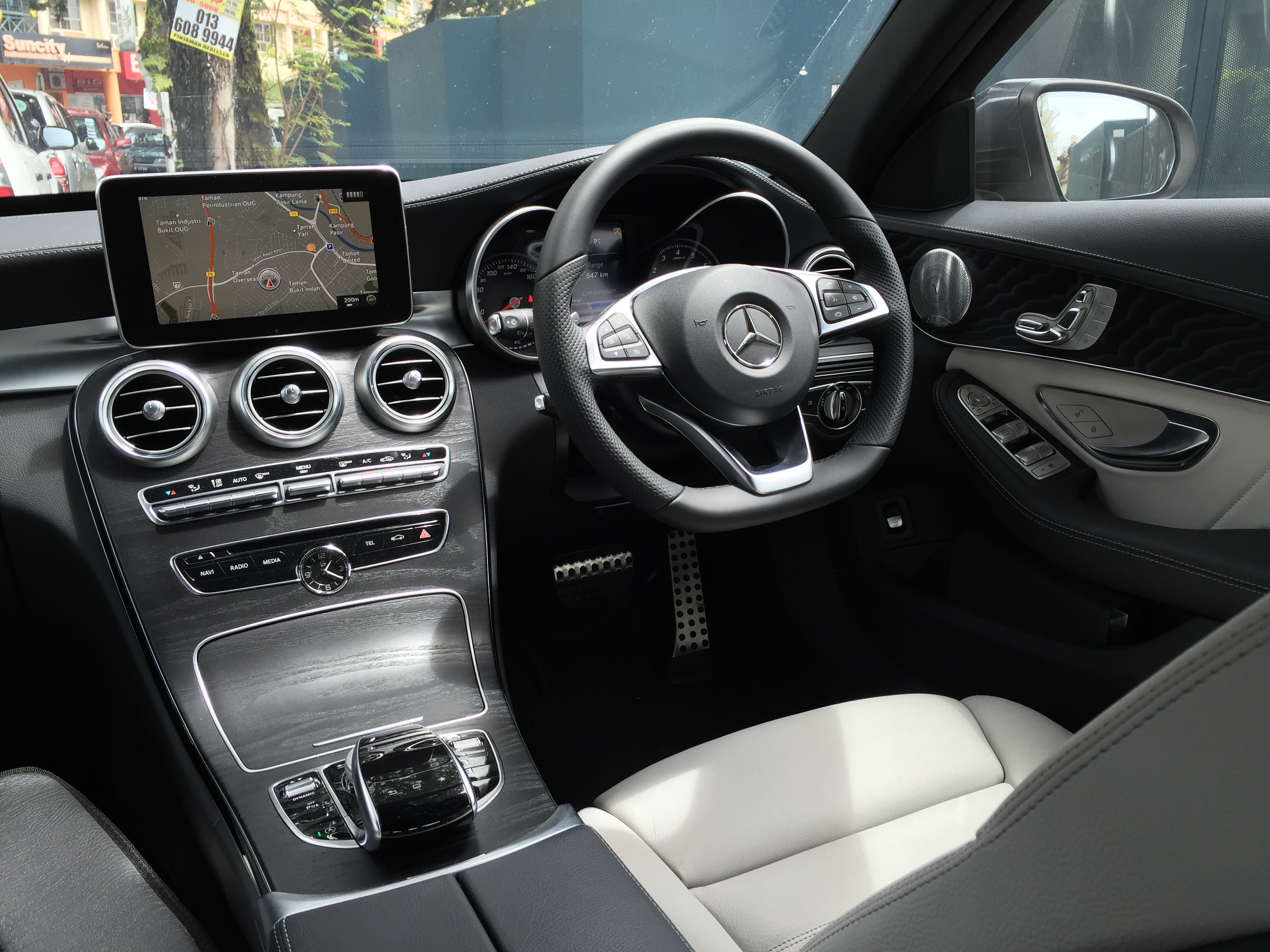
Interior (pre-facelift)

The car was presented on 16 December 2013 and at the 2014 North American International Auto Show. W205 production commenced on 4 February 2014 at the Bremen plant. European sales began in March 2014, while the vehicle went on sale in North America in September 2014, and in South Africa in March 2015.

As the Mercedes-Benz CLA-Class (released in April 2013) became the entry-level sedan in Mercedes' line up of cars, with styling somewhat recalling the W222 S-Class.

The W205 included Sport and Luxury trims with 241 hp (180 kW) 2.0-liter turbocharged I4 engine and 329 hp (245 kW) 3.0-liter bi-turbo V6 engine options. Mercedes all-wheel drive 4MATIC is standard across the initial offering. The car is about 3.7 inches (94 mm) longer and 1.7 inches (43 mm) wider than the W204.

Based on the new modular MRA rear-wheel drive platform, it features front axle four-link and rear axle five-link suspension.

== Variants ==
=== C 350e Plug-in Hybrid (2015–2019) ===
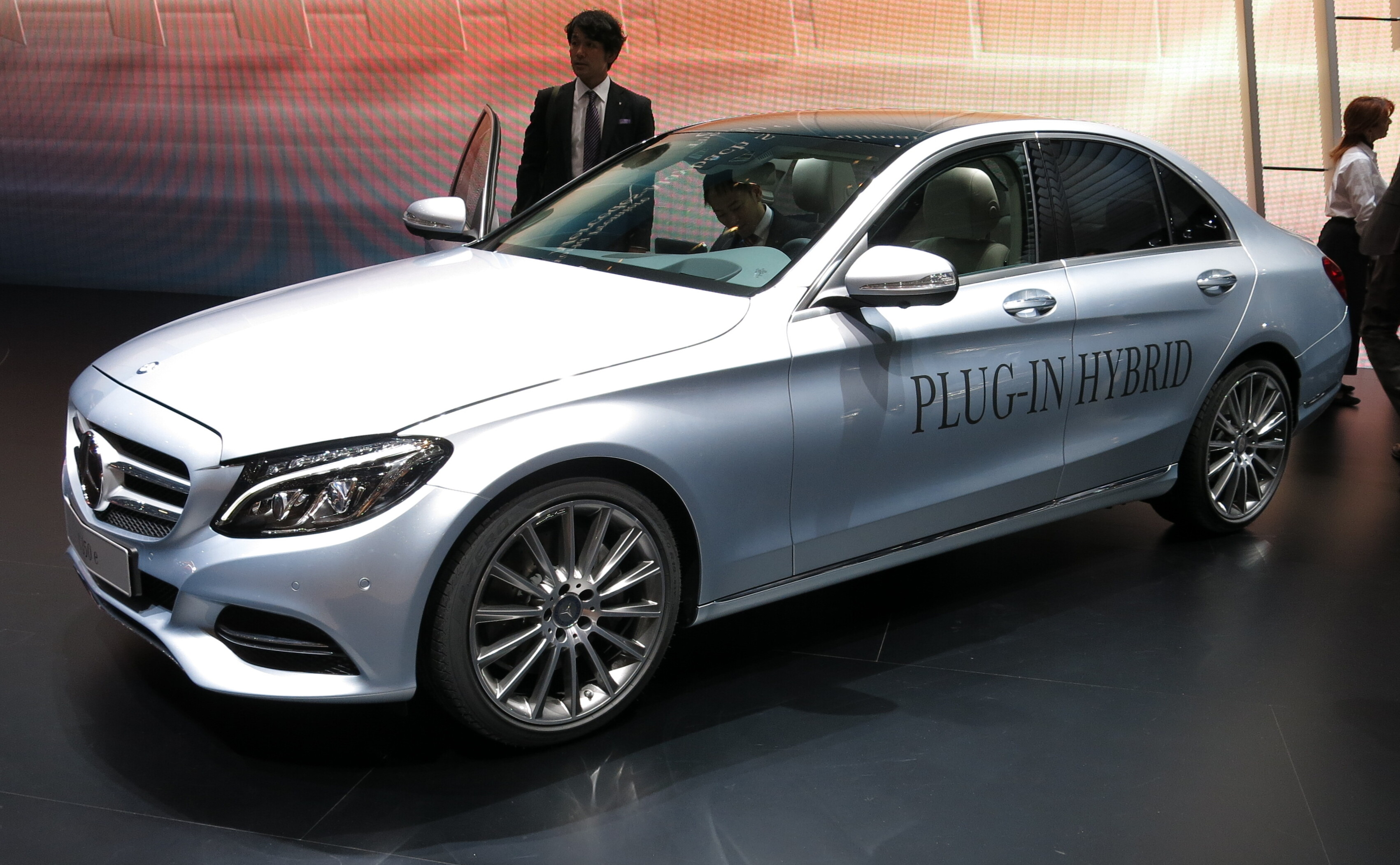
C 350 e Plug-in Hybrid

A plug-in hybrid version was introduced at the January 2015 North American International Auto Show, available in both Saloon and Estate variants. The C 350e plug-in hybrid is powered by a four-cylinder gasoline engine, in conjunction with a 60 kW electric motor, delivering a total system output of 205 kW (275 hp) and torque of 600 N⋅m (443 lb⋅ft). The motor is powered by 6.2 kWh lithium-ion battery delivering an all-electric range of 31 km (19 mi), CO_{2} emissions of 48 g/km and a fuel consumption of 2.1 L/100 km (130 mpg_{‑imp}; 110 mpg_{‑US}) under the New European Driving Cycle (NEDC). The C 350e has a haptic accelerator pedal.

In 2018, Mercedes-Benz released another plug-in hybrid C 350 – but this time it is a variant with a diesel engine.

=== C-Class Coupé (2015–2023) ===
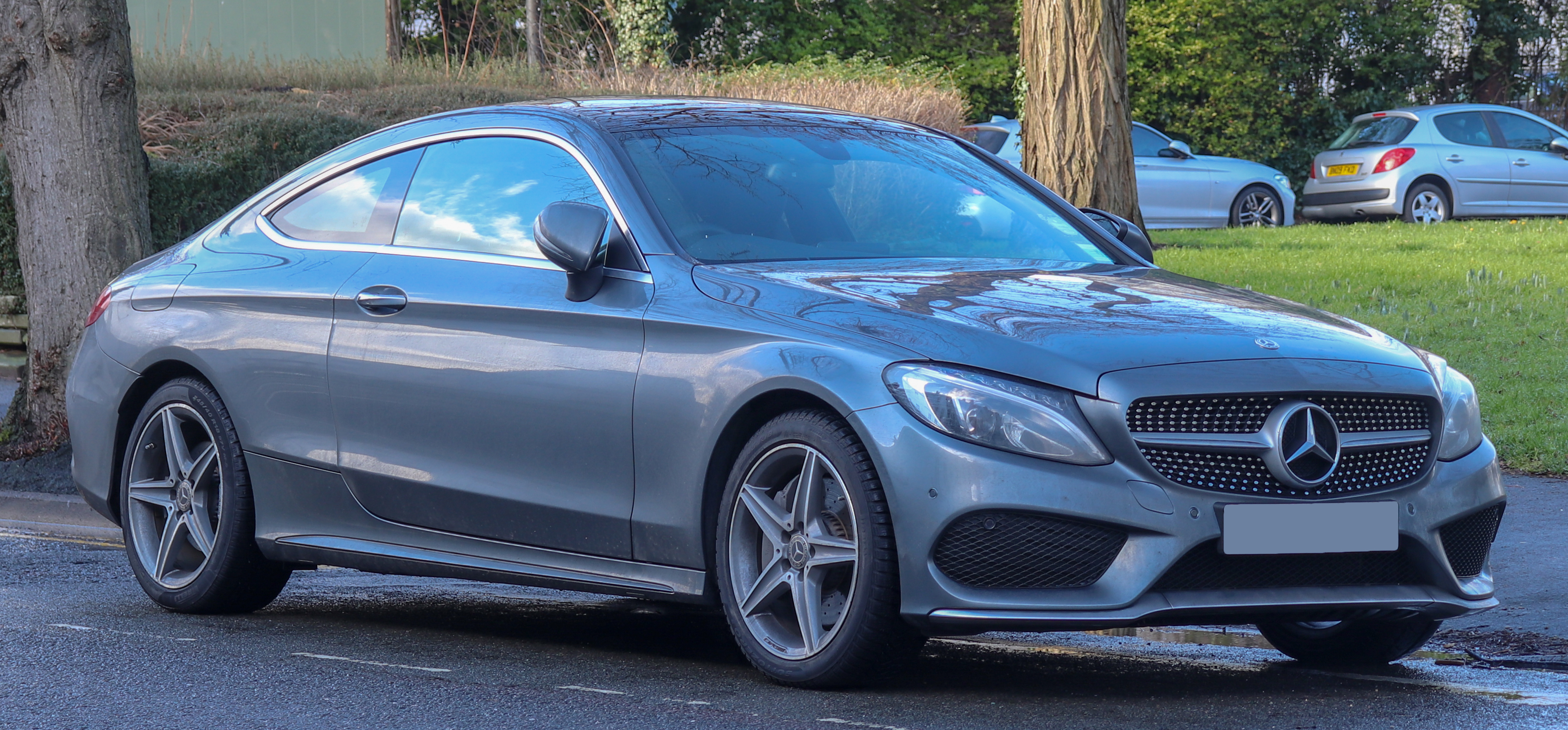

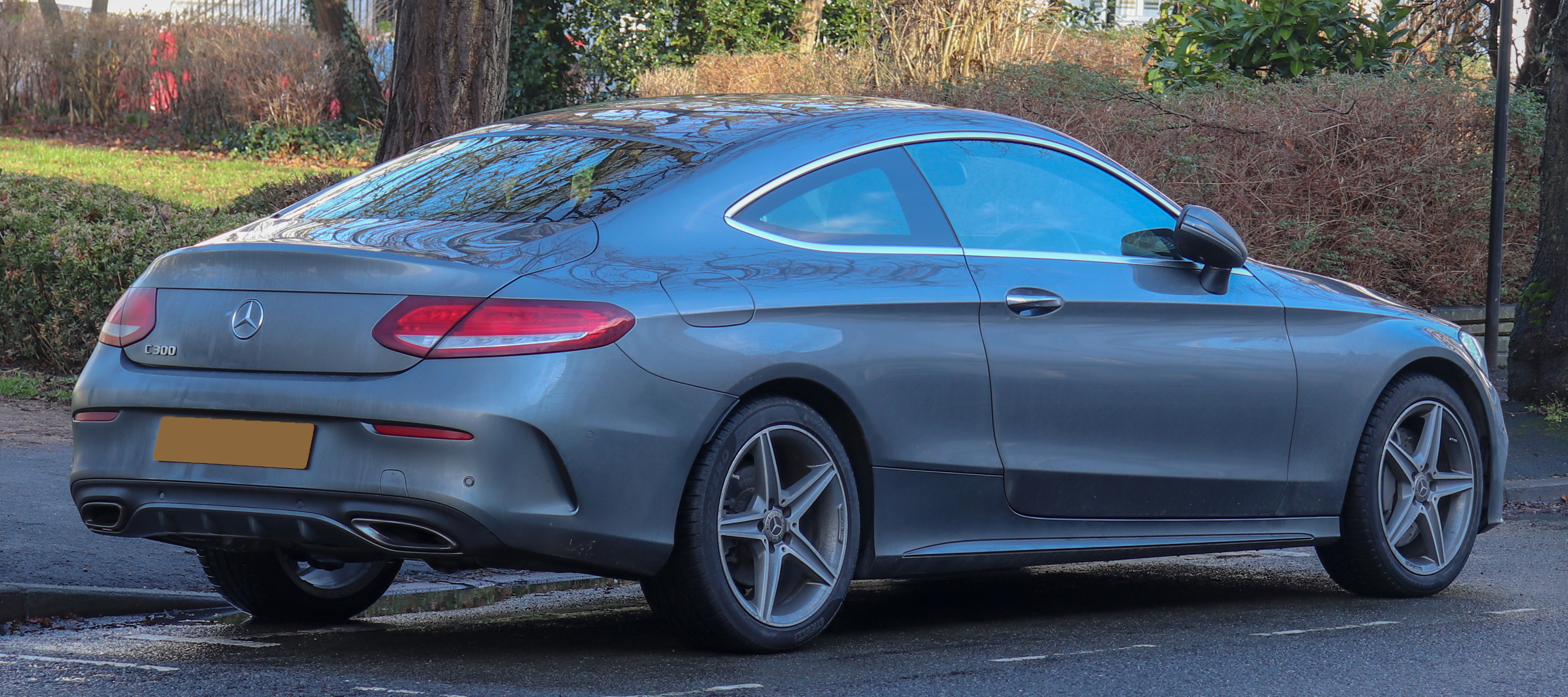
C205 Coupé (pre-facelift)

Debuted at the 2015 Frankfurt Auto Show, the appearance of the C-Class coupe leans heavily on that of the 2014 C-Class saloon. The two cars share the same basic front-end styling treatment through to the leading edge of the doors. From the back, the second-generation C-Class Coupé closely mimics the design of the 2014 S-Class Coupé.

The interior uses the same dashboard and switchgear as the 2014 C-Class saloon, but the C-Class coupe receives unique front sports seats with integral headrests as well as two individual rear seats. Because of the absence of a B-pillar, there is also a standard automatic seatbelt feeder similar to that used by the 2014 E-Class Coupé.

A Bluetooth-compatible entertainment system allowing internet capability through a mobile phone is standard. Also included is the Attention Assist function, which warns the driver of inattentiveness and drowsiness. It is joined by Collision Prevention Assist, which can carry out autonomous braking at speeds up to 124 mph (200 km/h) in combination with a further standard system called Adaptive Brake Assist.

As part of Mercedes-Benz's efforts to establish itself at the forefront of autonomous driving technology, the 2015 C-Class Coupé also comes with an optional Distronic Plus system. It enables the Coupé to autonomously steer in order to remain in its lane at speeds between 0 and 124 mph (0 and 200 km/h).

=== C-Class Cabriolet (2016–2023) ===
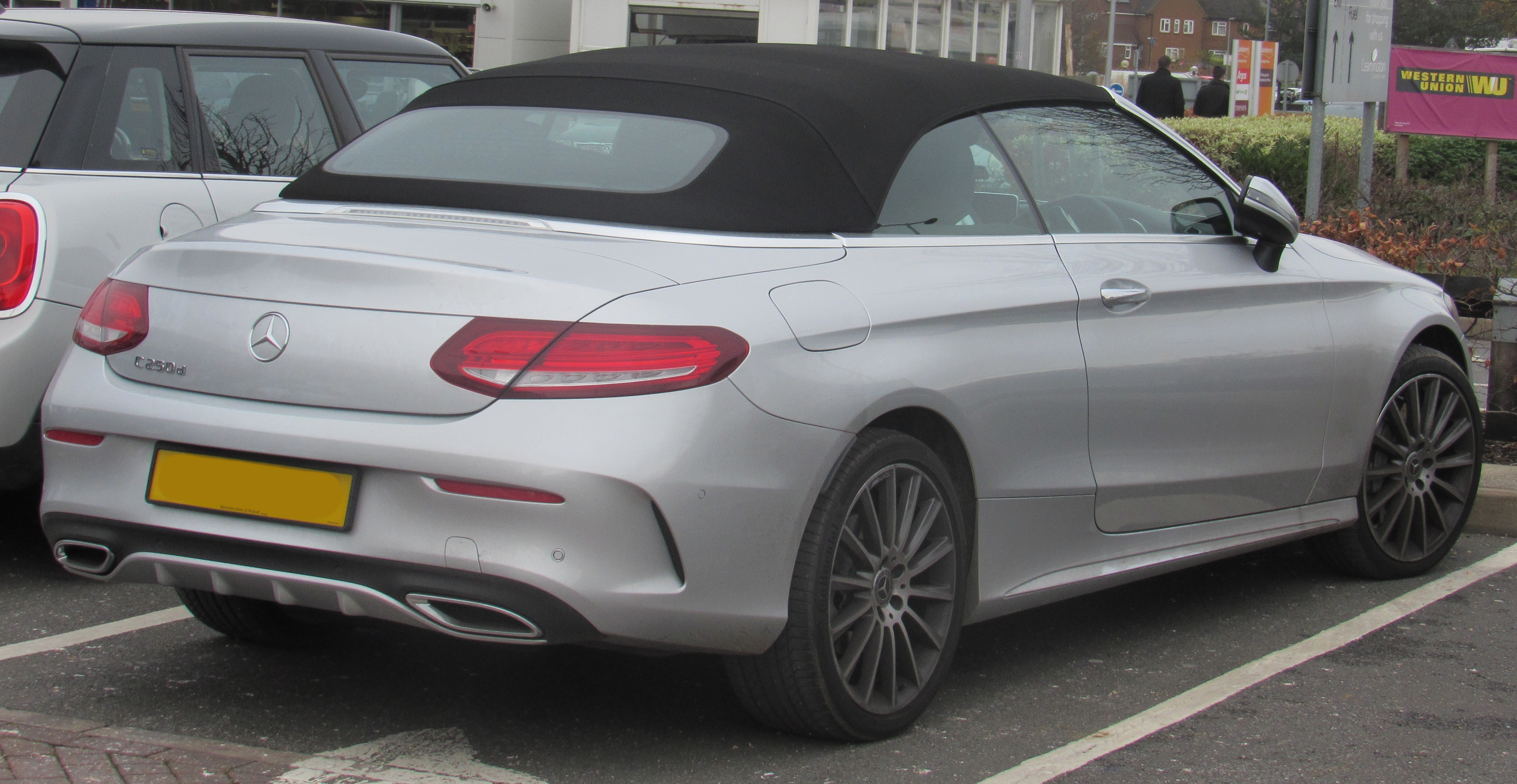
A205 Cabriolet (pre-facelift; soft-top retracted)

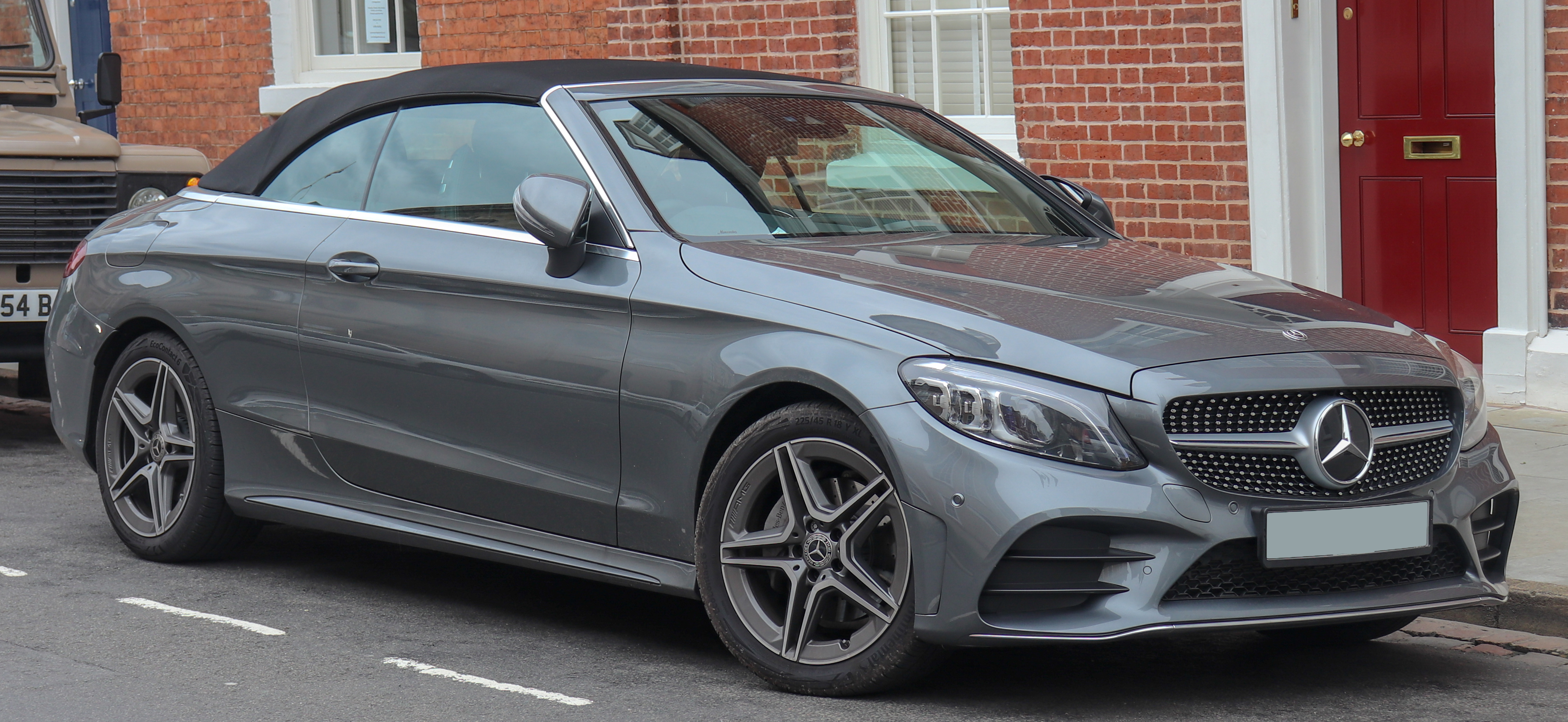
A205 Cabriolet (facelift)

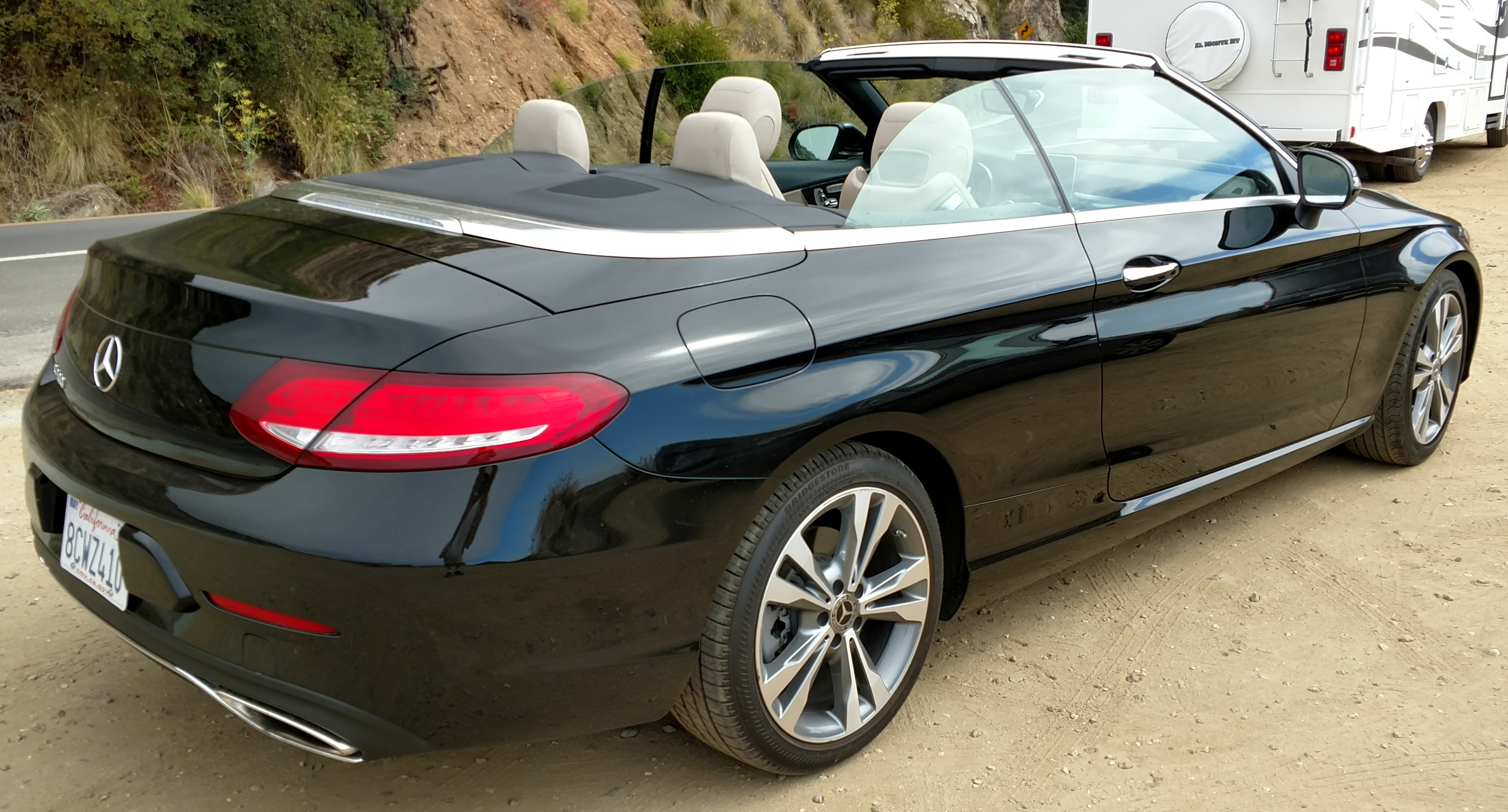
A205 Cabriolet (facelift)

Mercedes-Benz's first-ever C-Class Cabriolet (in fact the only compact cabriolet since 1955) was revealed at the 2016 Geneva Motor Show. Based on the C-Class Coupé, the four-seat soft-top keeps the same basic dimensions as the coupé, but is marginally taller. Its fabric roof can be opened or closed in 20 seconds at up to 50 km/h (31 mph). When open, the roof is stored in the trunk.

The interior of the C-Class Cabriolet is almost identical to that of the coupé but includes heat-reflecting leather and a switch on the centre console to open and close the roof. The sports seats also include Mercedes’ AIRSCARF heating system, while the AIRCAP system stops draughts inside the cabin.

== Drivetrain (2014–2018) ==
=== Engines ===
Petrol engines
Models	Engines	Power	Torque
C 160	1,595 cc (97.3 cu in) turbocharged 16V I4 (M274 DE16 LA)	129 PS (95 kW; 127 hp) at 5,000 rpm	210 N⋅m (150 lbf⋅ft) at 1,200-4,000 rpm
C 180	1,595 cc (97.3 cu in) turbocharged 16V I4 (M274 DE16 LA)	156 PS (115 kW; 154 hp) at 5,300 rpm	250 N⋅m (180 lbf⋅ft) at 1,250-4,000 rpm
C 200	1,991 cc (121.5 cu in) turbocharged 16V I4 (M274 DE20 LA)	184 PS (135 kW; 181 hp) at 5,500 rpm	300 N⋅m (220 lbf⋅ft) at 1,200-4,000 rpm
C 200 4MATIC	1,991 cc (121.5 cu in) turbocharged 16V I4 (M274 DE20 LA)	184 PS (135 kW; 181 hp) at 5,500 rpm	300 N⋅m (220 lbf⋅ft) at 1,200-4,000 rpm
C 250	1,991 cc (121.5 cu in) turbocharged 16V I4 (M274 DE20 LA)	211 PS (155 kW; 208 hp) at 5,500 rpm	350 N⋅m (260 lbf⋅ft) at 1,200-4,000 rpm
C 300	1,991 cc (121.5 cu in) turbocharged 16V I4 (M274 DE20 LA)	245 PS (180 kW; 242 hp) at 5,550 rpm	370 N⋅m (270 lbf⋅ft) at 1,300-4,000 rpm
C 400 4MATIC	2,996 cc (182.8 cu in) twin-turbo 24V V6 (M276 DE30 LA)	333 PS (245 kW; 328 hp) at 5,250-6,000 rpm	480 N⋅m (350 lbf⋅ft) at 1,400-4,000 rpm
C 450 4MATIC AMG Sport	2,996 cc (182.8 cu in) twin-turbo 24V V6 (M276 DE30 LA)	367 PS (270 kW; 362 hp) at 5,500-6,000 rpm	520 N⋅m (380 lbf⋅ft) at 2,000-4,200 rpm
AMG C 43 4MATIC	2,996 cc (182.8 cu in) twin-turbo 24V V6 (M276 DE30 LA)	367 PS (270 kW; 362 hp) at 5,500-6,000 rpm	520 N⋅m (380 lbf⋅ft) at 2,000-4,200 rpm
AMG C 63	3,982 cc (243.0 cu in) twin-turbo 32V V8 (M177 DE40 LA)	476 PS (350 kW; 469 hp) at 5,500-6,250 rpm	650 N⋅m (480 lbf⋅ft) at 1,750-4,500 rpm
AMG C 63 S	3,982 cc (243.0 cu in) twin-turbo 32V V8 (M177 DE40 LA)	510 PS (380 kW; 500 hp) at 5,500-6,250 rpm	700 N⋅m (520 lbf⋅ft) at 1,750-4,500 rpm

Diesel engines
Models	Engines	Power	Torque
C 180d	1,598 cc (97.5 cu in) turbocharged 16V I4 (OM626 DE16 LA red.)	116 PS (85 kW; 114 hp) at 3,000-4,600 rpm	280 N⋅m (207 lbf⋅ft) at 1,500-2,800 rpm
C 200d	1,598 cc (97.5 cu in) turbocharged 16V I4 (OM626 DE16 LA)	136 PS (100 kW; 134 hp) at 3,800 rpm	300 N⋅m (221 lbf⋅ft) at 1,500-3,000 rpm
C 200d	2,143 cc (130.8 cu in) turbocharged 16V I4 (OM651 DE22 LA red.)	136 PS (100 kW; 134 hp) at 2,800-4,600 rpm	350 N⋅m (258 lbf⋅ft) at 1,200-2,700 rpm
C 220d BlueEFFICIENCY Edition	2,143 cc (130.8 cu in) twin-turbo 16V I4 (OM651 DE22 LA)	163 PS (120 kW; 161 hp) at 3,000-4,600 rpm	400 N⋅m (295 lbf⋅ft) at 1,400-2,800 rpm
C 220d	2,143 cc (130.8 cu in) twin-turbo 16V I4 (OM651 DE22 LA)	170 PS (125 kW; 168 hp) at 3,000-4,200 rpm	400 N⋅m (295 lbf⋅ft) at 1,400-2,800 rpm
C 220d 4MATIC	2,143 cc (130.8 cu in) twin-turbo 16V I4 (OM651 DE22 LA)	170 PS (125 kW; 168 hp) at 3,000-4,200 rpm	400 N⋅m (295 lbf⋅ft) at 1,400-2,800 rpm
C 250d	2,143 cc (130.8 cu in) twin-turbo 16V I4 (OM651 DE22 LA)	204 PS (150 kW; 201 hp) at 3,800 rpm	500 N⋅m (369 lbf⋅ft) at 1,600-1,800 rpm
C 250d 4MATIC	2,143 cc (130.8 cu in) twin-turbo 16V I4 (OM651 DE22 LA)	204 PS (150 kW; 201 hp) at 3,800 rpm	500 N⋅m (369 lbf⋅ft) at 1,600-1,800 rpm

Hybrid engines
Models	Engines	Power	Torque
C 300h	2,143 cc (130.8 cu in) twin-turbo 16V I4 (OM651 DE22 LA) + Electric Motor	204 PS (150 kW; 201 hp) + 27 PS (20 kW; 27 hp) at 3,800 rpm	500 N⋅m (369 lbf⋅ft) + 250 N⋅m (184 lbf⋅ft) at 1,600-1,800 rpm
C 350e	1,991 cc (121.5 cu in) turbocharged 16V I4 (M274 DE20 LA) + Electric Motor (PHEV)	211 PS (155 kW; 208 hp) + 82 PS (60 kW; 81 hp) at 5,500 rpm	350 N⋅m (258 lbf⋅ft) + 340 N⋅m (251 lbf⋅ft) at 1,200-4,000 rpm

=== Transmissions ===
Petrol engines
Models	Production years	Standard	Optional
C 160	2015–2018	6-speed manual	9G-TRONIC (2017–2018)
C 180	2014–2018	6-speed manual	7G-TRONIC Plus (2014–2017) 9G-TRONIC (2016–2017)
C 200	2014–2018	6-speed manual	7G-TRONIC Plus (2014–2017) 9G-TRONIC (2016–2017)
C 200 4MATIC	2015–2018	7G-TRONIC Plus (2015–2017) 9G-TRONIC (2017–2018)	-
C 250	2014–2018	7G-TRONIC Plus (2014–2017) 9G-TRONIC (2017–2018)	-
C 300	2015–2018	7G-TRONIC Plus (2015–2017) 9G-TRONIC (2017–2018)	-
C 400 4MATIC	2014–2018	7G-TRONIC Plus (2014–2017) 9G-TRONIC (2017–2018)	-
C 450 4MATIC AMG Sport	2015–2016	7G-TRONIC Plus	-
AMG C 43 4MATIC	2016–2018	9G-TRONIC	-
AMG C 63	2015–2018	AMG SPEEDSHIFT MCT 7-speed	-
AMG C 63 S	2015–2018	AMG SPEEDSHIFT MCT 7-speed	-

Diesel engines
Models	Production years	Standard	Optional
C 180d	2014–2018	6-speed manual	7G-TRONIC Plus
C 200d	2014–2018	6-speed manual	7G-TRONIC Plus (2014–2017) 9G-TRONIC (2017–2018)
C 220d BlueEFFICIENCY Edition	2014–2016	7G-TRONIC Plus	-
C 220d	2014–2018	6-speed manual	7G-TRONIC Plus (2014–2016) 9G-TRONIC (2016–2018)
C 220d 4MATIC	2015–2018	7G-TRONIC Plus (2015–2016) 9G-TRONIC (2016–2018)	-
C 250d	2014–2018	7G-TRONIC Plus (2014–2016) 9G-TRONIC (2016–2018)	-
C 250d 4MATIC	2014–2018	7G-TRONIC Plus (2014–2016) 9G-TRONIC (2016–2018)	-

Hybrid engines
Models	Production years	Standard	Optional
C 300h	2014–2018	7G-TRONIC Plus	-
C 350e	2015–2018	7G-TRONIC Plus (2015–2016) 9G-TRONIC (2016–2018)	-

== AMG models ==
=== C 450 AMG Sport 4MATIC (2015–2017), AMG C 43 (2017–2023) ===
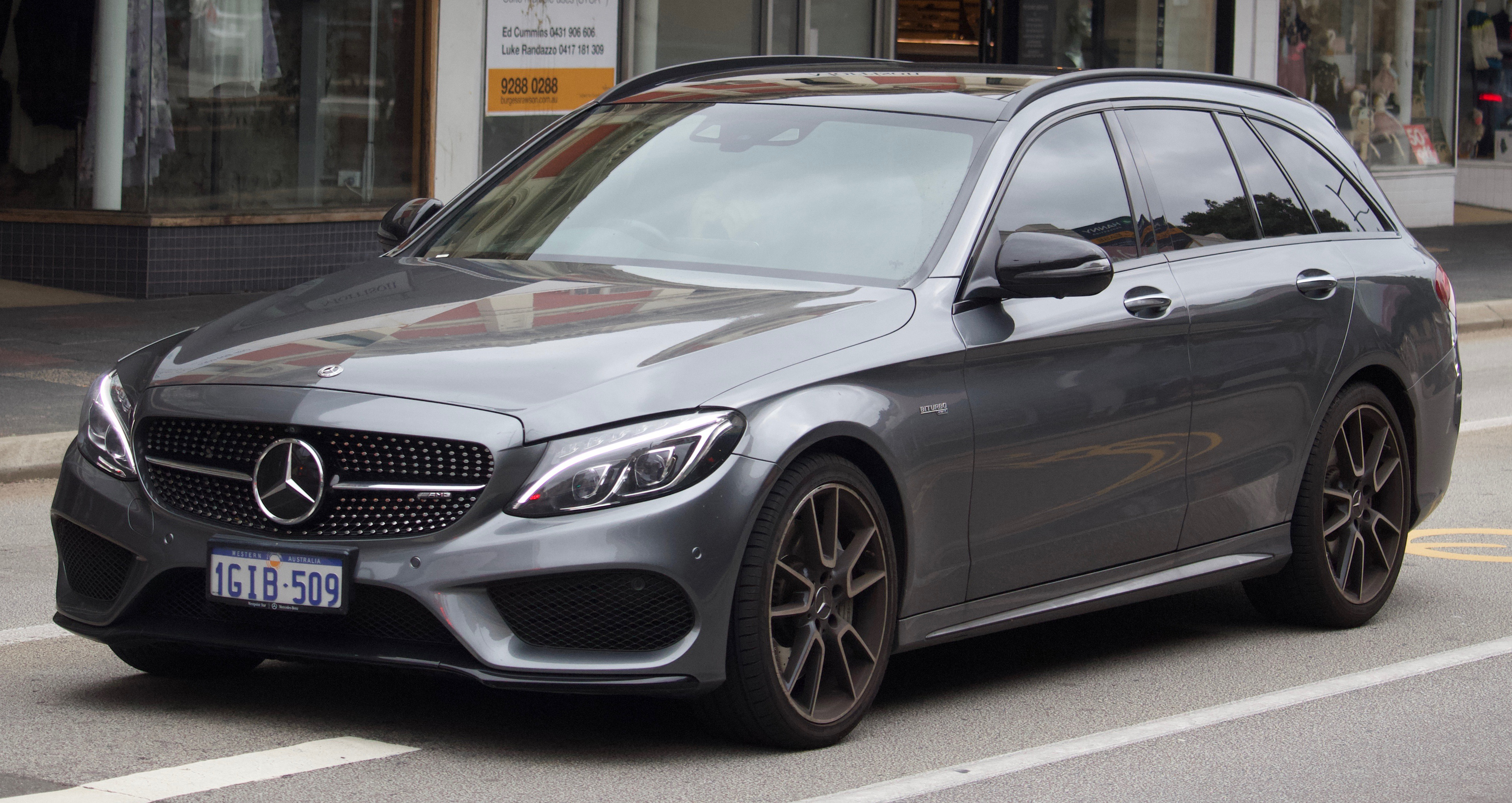
Mercedes-AMG C 43 (S205)

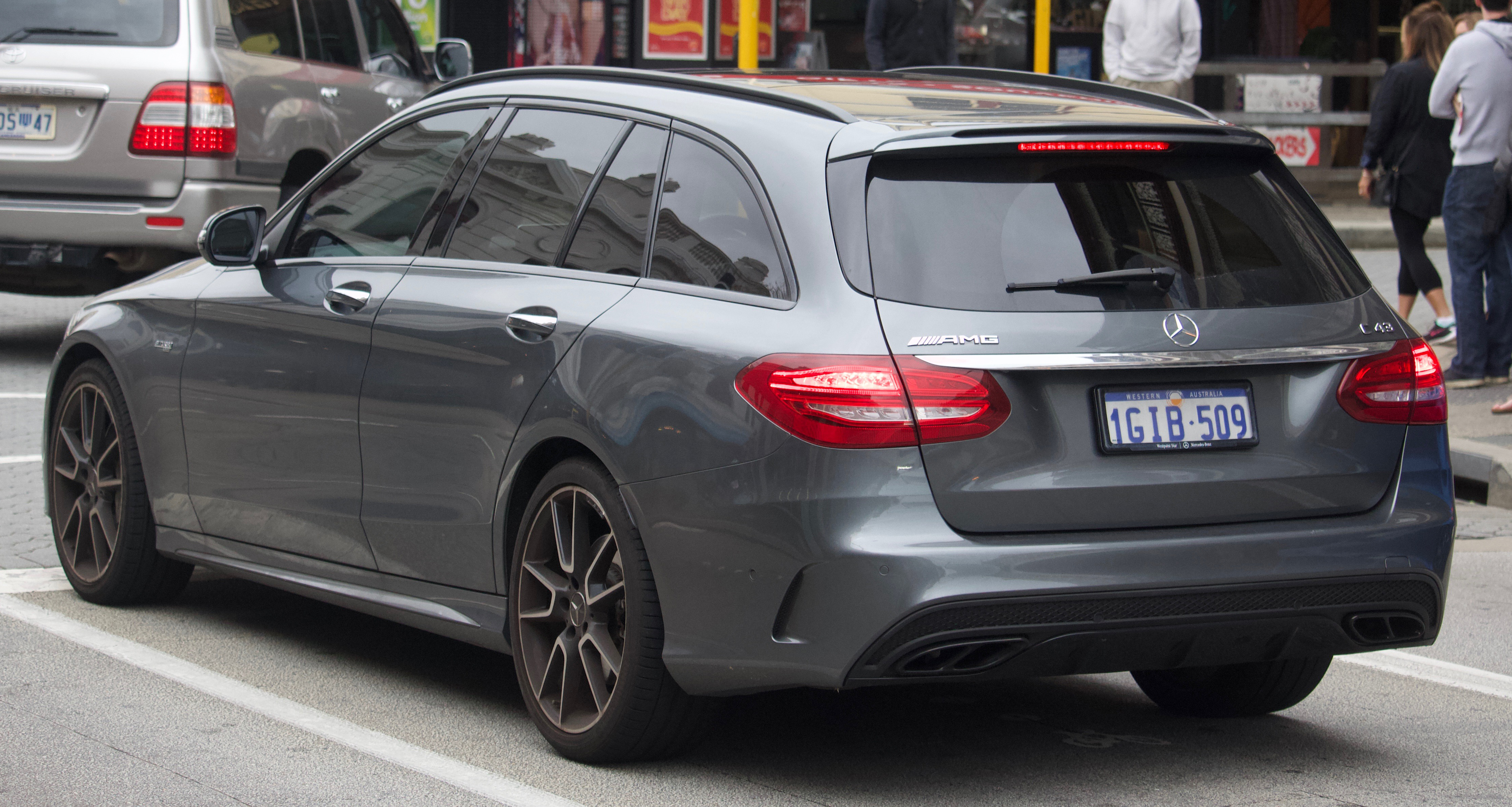
Mercedes-AMG C 43 (S205)

The C 450 AMG 4MATIC has the same engine as the C 400 4MATIC. It has a more powerful version of the twin-turbo 3.0 litre V6 producing 362 hp (270 kW) and 384 lb⋅ft (521 N⋅m) of torque. Some components, such as the front axle, steering system and suspension are shared with the C 63. It has all-wheel drive and is paired to a 7-speed automatic transmission. It reaches 62 mph (100 km/h) in 4.9 seconds.

For the 2017 model year, the C450 AMG was renamed to AMG C 43. It retains the same 3.0-litre twin-turbo engine, but it is now mated with a 9-speed automatic transmission. It also features some cosmetic changes, as well as becoming available in a coupé rather than sedan. The 2017-2018 AMG C 43/63 had the option to add the AMG Performance Exhaust (PE), which allowed the driver to open and close the flaps on the factory-valved exhaust with the touch of a button within the cabin. This allowed the ability to operate the car in a quiet manner, but also the ability to switch to a more aggressive exhaust note with pops, bangs, and burbles. 2019+ AMG models equipped with the PE had the exhaust muted significantly due to noise and emission regulations.

=== AMG C 63/C 63 S (2015–2021) ===
The AMG C 63 uses a similar 4.0-liter twin-turbocharged V8 to the Mercedes-AMG GT sports car. Mercedes offers it with two outputs: 469 hp (350 kW) and 650 N⋅m (479 lb⋅ft) of torque for the C 63 and 503 hp (375 kW) and 700 N⋅m (516 lb⋅ft) of torque for the more potent C 63 S. By moving to the downsized and turbocharged engine, Mercedes claims the W205 version consumes 32 percent less fuel than the model it replaced.

The C 63 should also be able to complete the 0–100 km/h (0–62 mph) sprint in 4.1 seconds with a top speed electronically limited to 250 km/h (155 mph), and 3.9 seconds in the S variant with a top speed of 290 km/h (180 mph) with a special request from AMG to raise the speed limiter. The car still uses a seven-speed automatic transmission that sends power to the rear wheels and three-stage adaptive dampers specific to AMG models along with speed-sensitive variable steering. High-performance brakes are also a part of the package with 390 mm (15.4 in) discs in front and 360 mm (14.2 in) discs in the rear. On both ends of the car, there are AMG-branded calipers. Its first deliveries took place in early 2015 for the European market with a U.S. debut later in the year.

The Estate variant served as the official Medical Car of Formula One between 2015 and 2021, and has since been replaced by the Mercedes-AMG GT 4-Door Coupé.

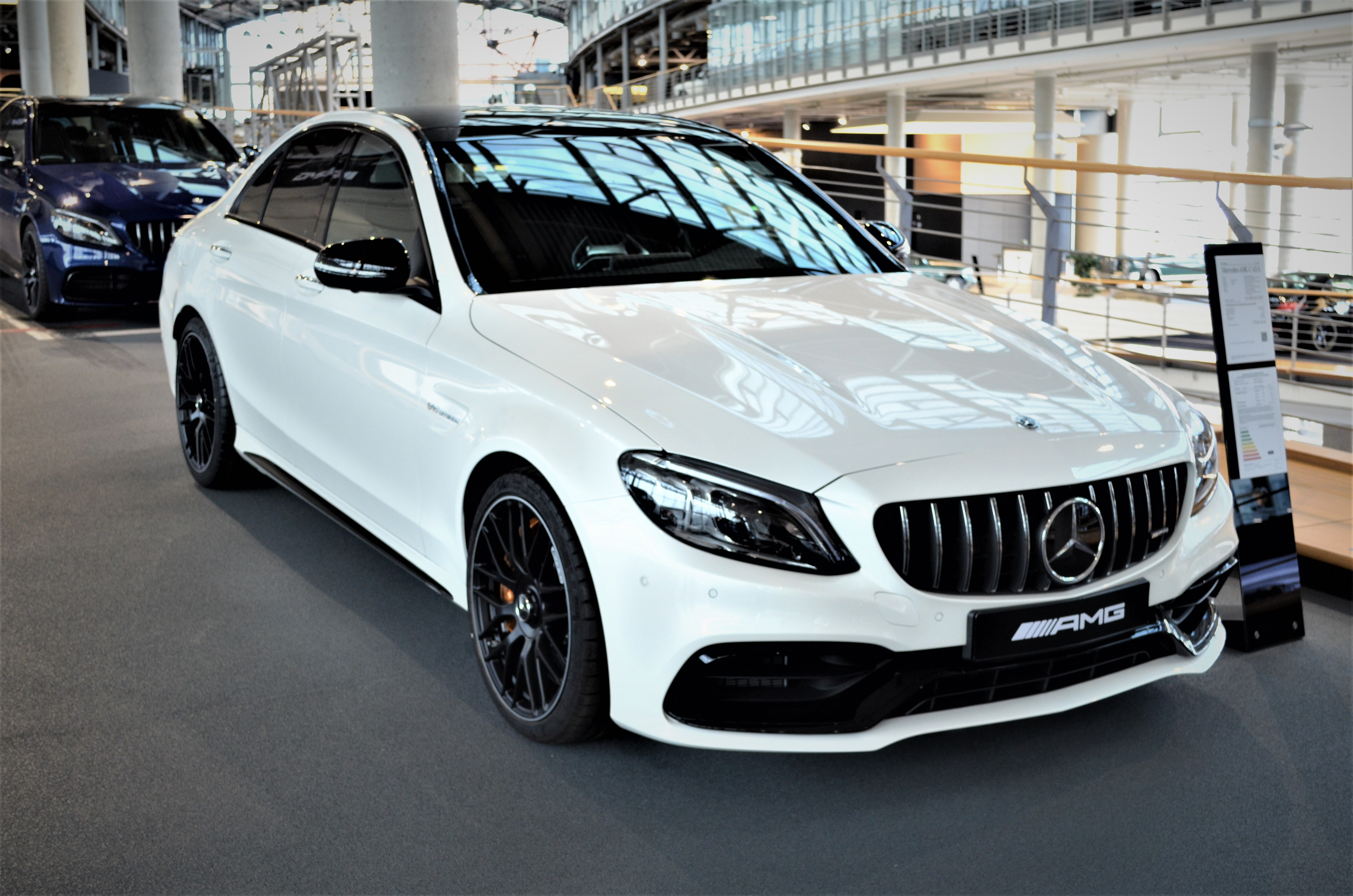
Mercedes-AMG C 63 (Facelift)

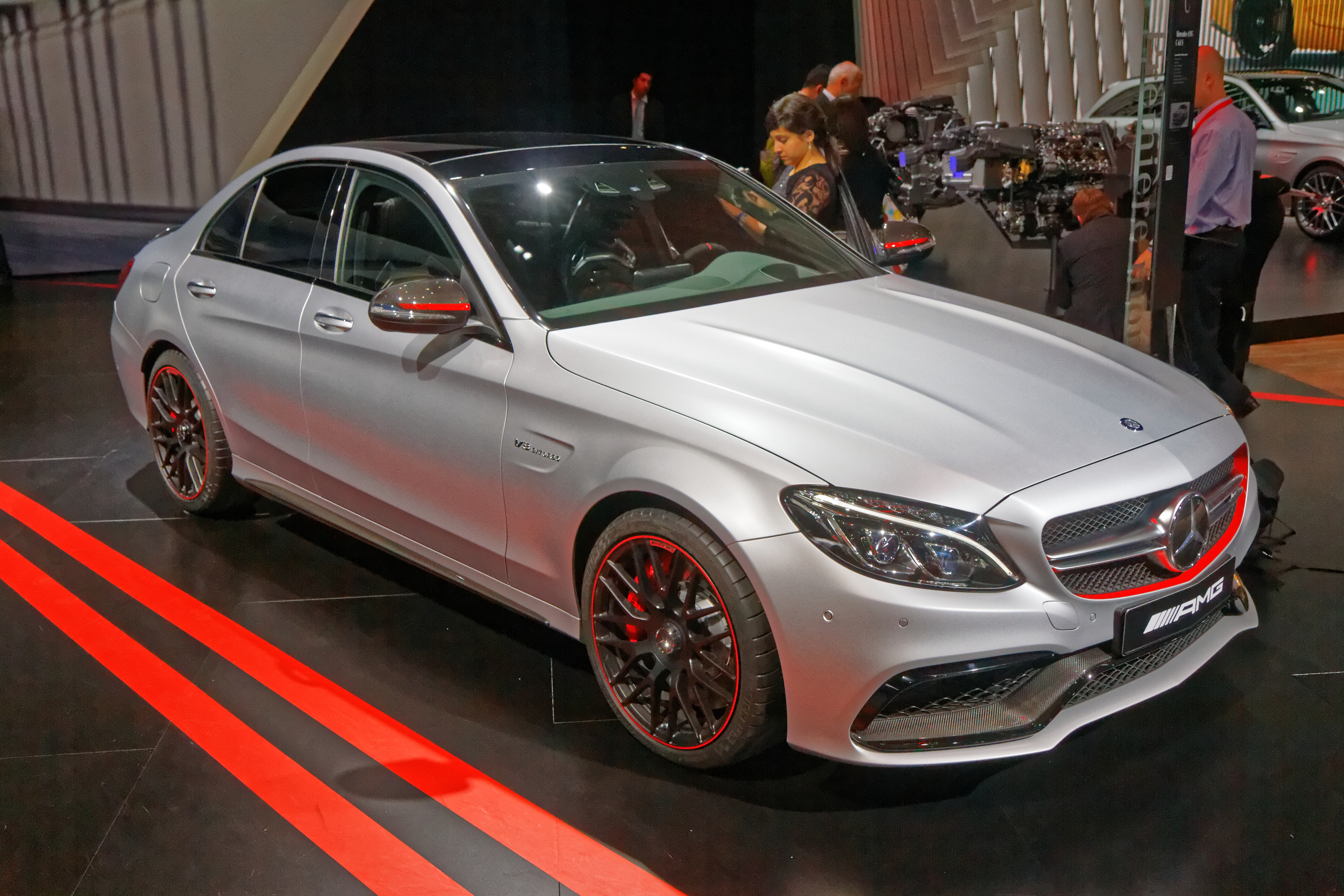
Mercedes-AMG C 63 S Edition 1

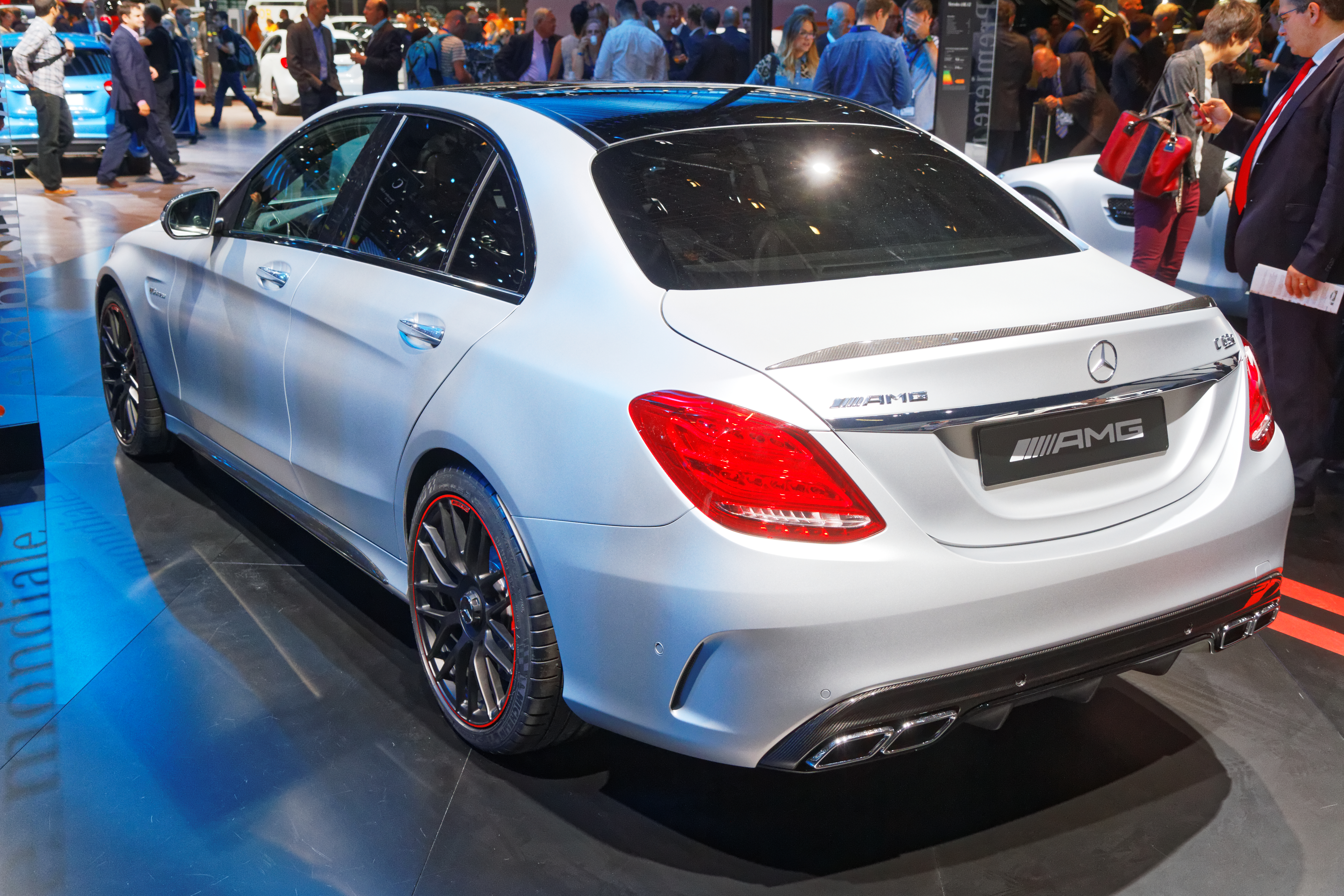
Mercedes-AMG C 63 S Edition 1 (rear)

=== AMG C 63/C 63 S Coupe & Cabriolet (2016–2022) ===
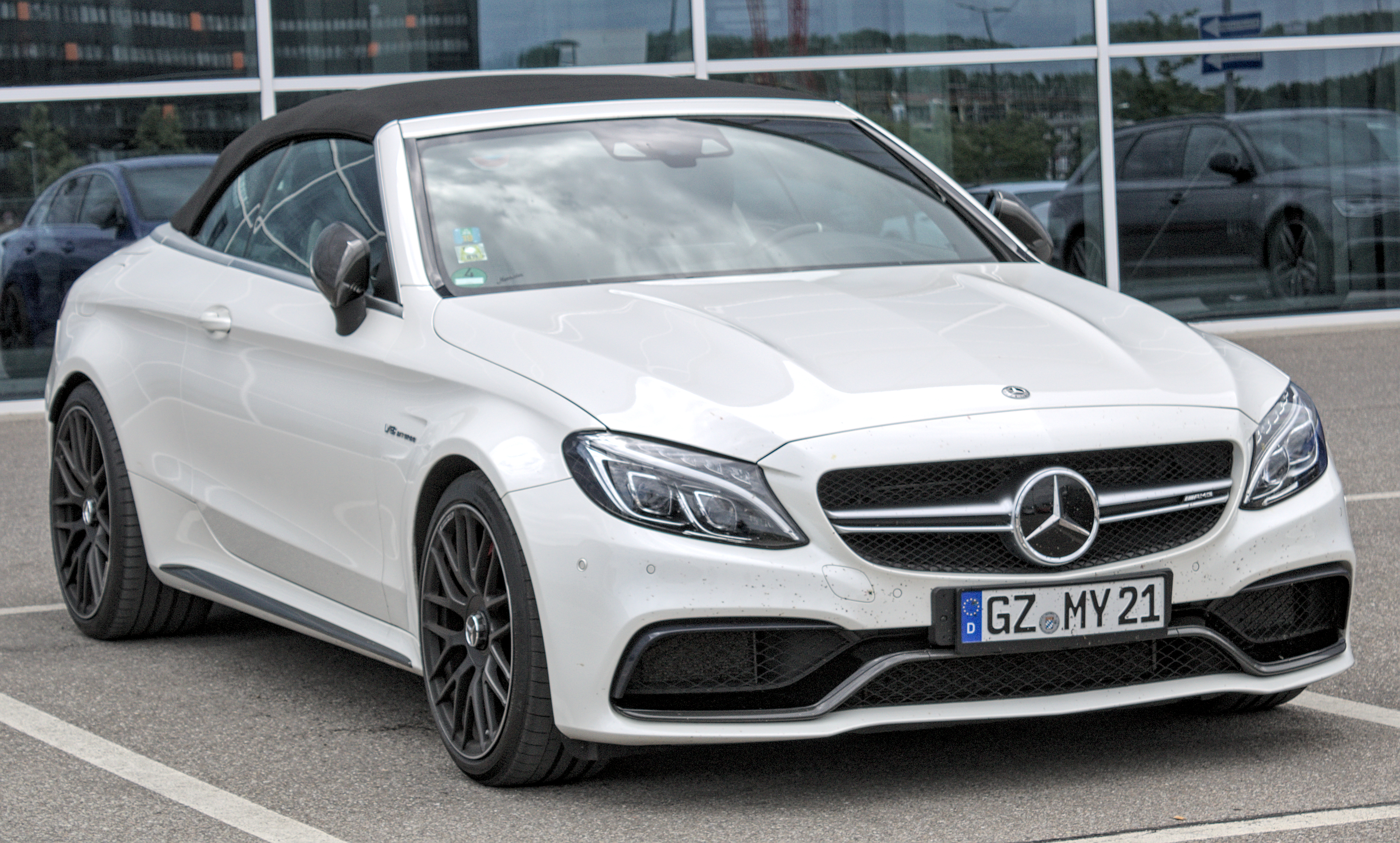
Mercedes-Benz C 63 AMG cabriolet

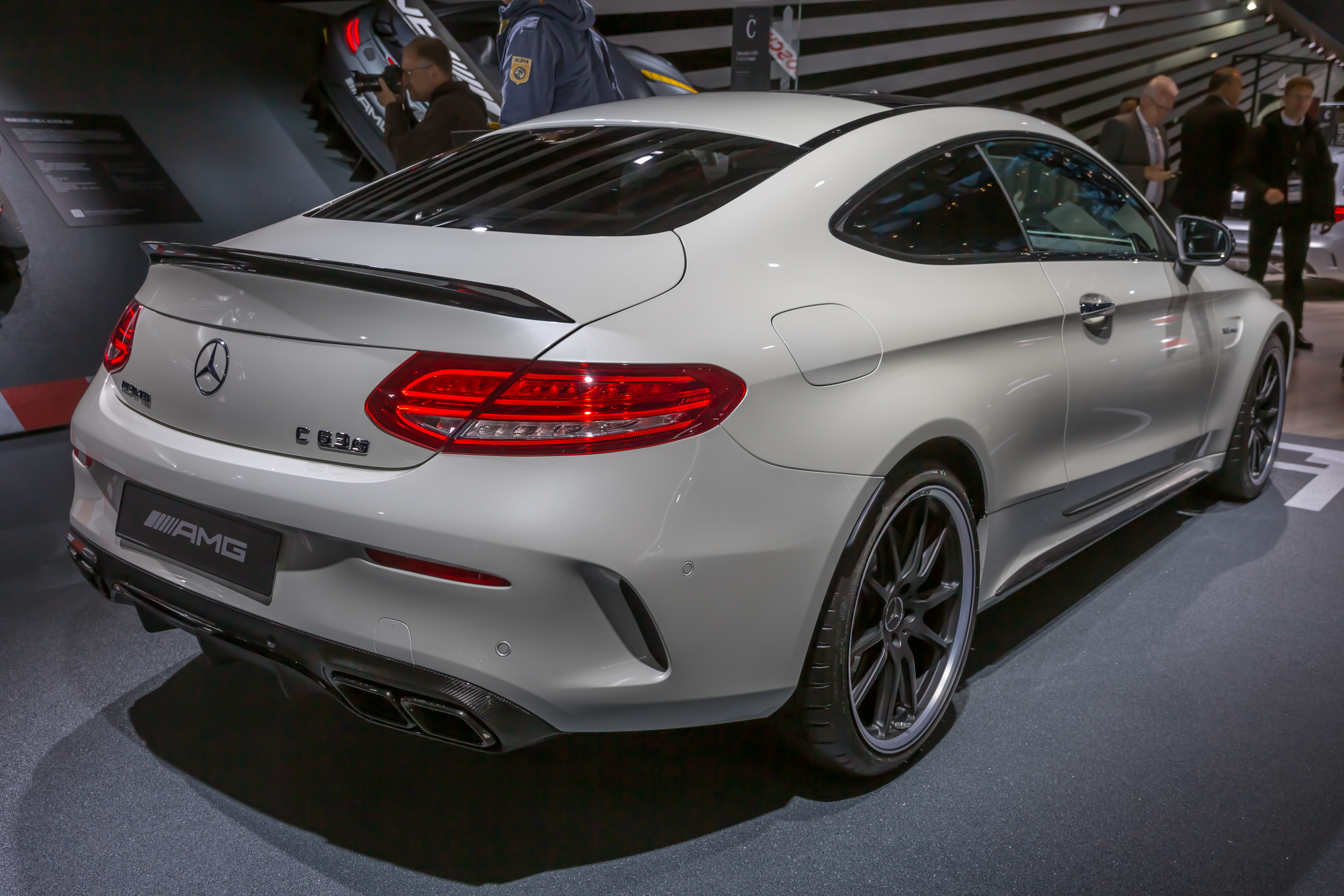
Mercedes-Benz C 63 S AMG coupe

Mercedes-Benz also revealed the high-performance C 63 coupe from Mercedes-AMG at the 2015 Frankfurt Auto Show. The C 63 coupe features many distinct design elements to set it apart from its tamer sibling. The most obvious is the aggressive front bumper, which features larger scoops to feed more air to the car's twin-turbocharged 4.0-litre V-8 as well as to its high-performance brakes. The grille is also unique, and the hood features some muscular ripples that the regular C-Class Coupe does not.

The C 63 coupe also benefits from a wider track, as evidenced by the pumped wheel arches. The wheels are also bigger on the Mercedes-AMG model with 19 inches in diameter. The C-Class Coupe comes with 18-inch wheels as standard.

The mechanical package is almost identical to the C 63 sedan. This means 469 hp (350 kW) in the C 63 coupe and 503 hp (375 kW) for the S-badged model. Drive will be to the rear wheels only, via a paddle-shifted, seven-speed automatic transmission.

== 2018 facelift ==
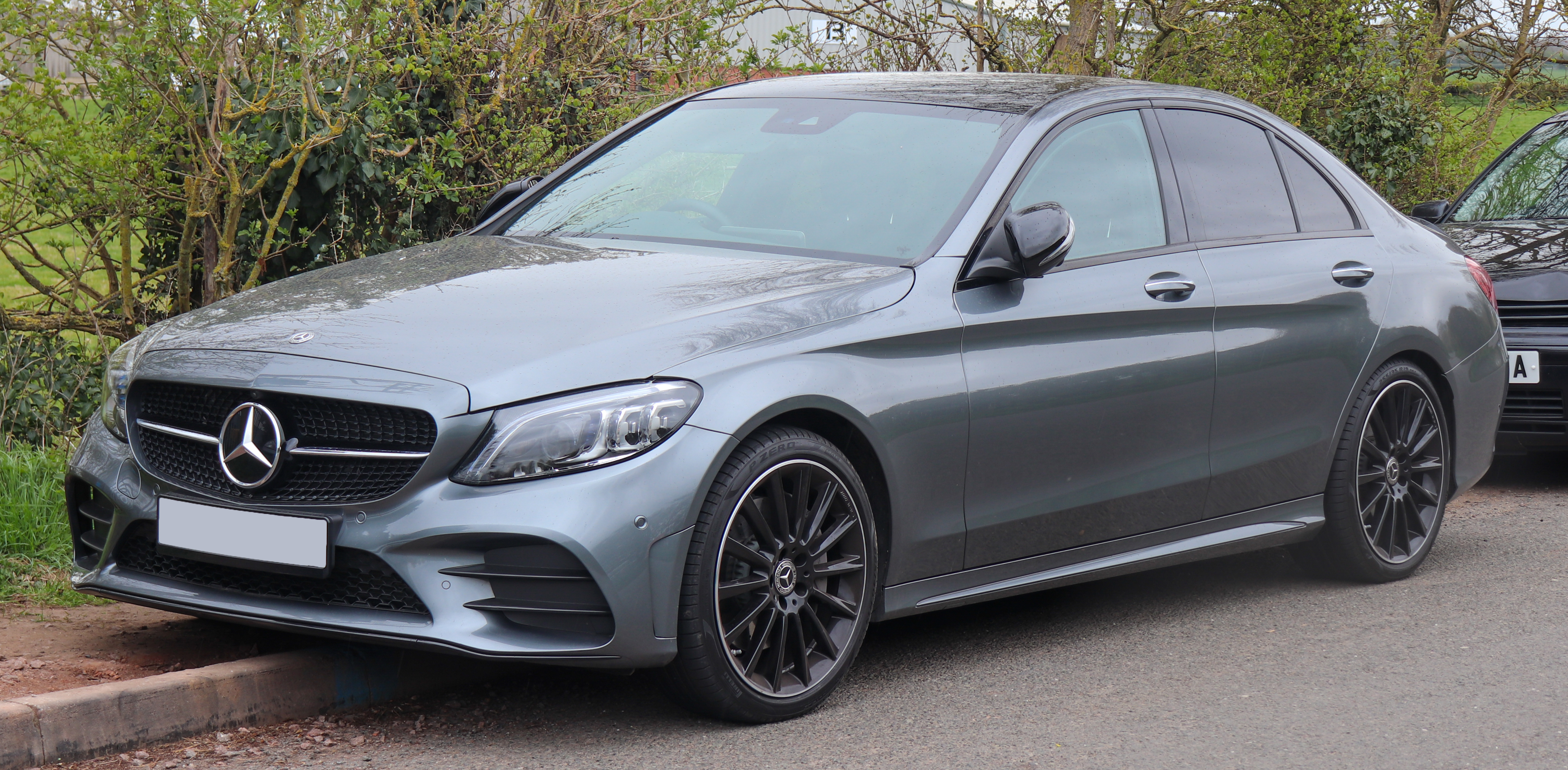
W205 facelift

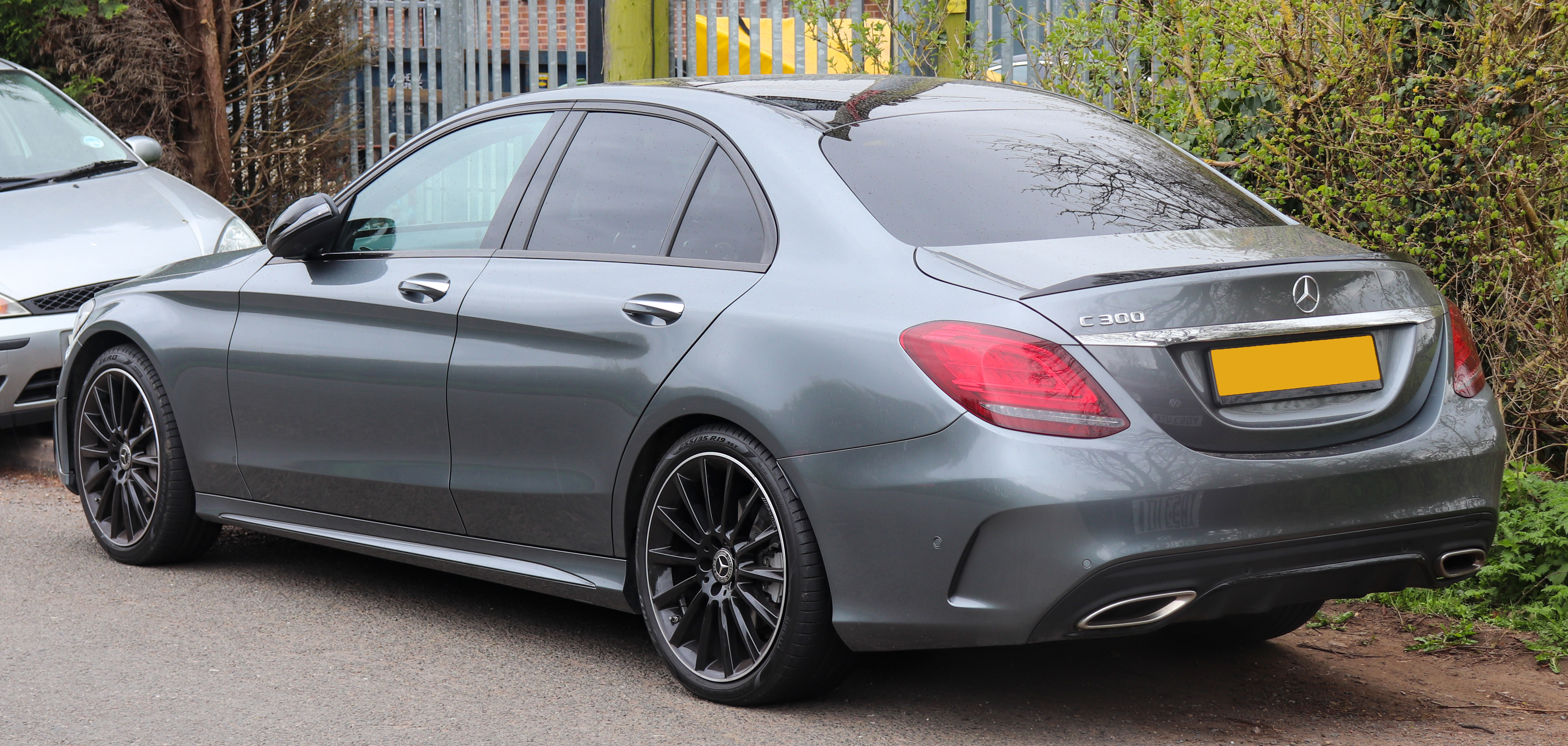
The facelift features C-shaped light guides in the LED tail lights on the sedan models.

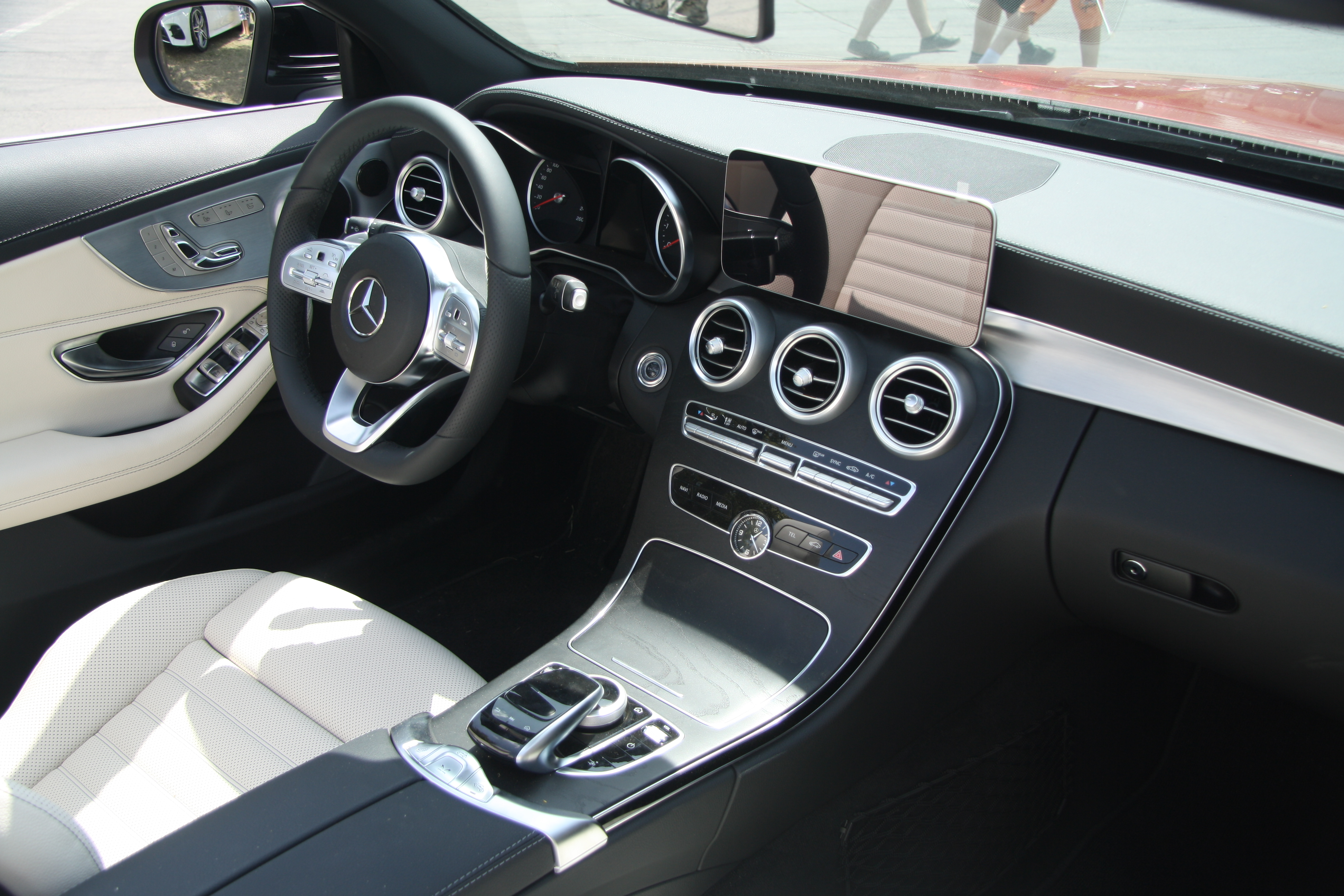
Interior (facelift)

The facelift versions were released in 2018 for the 2019 model year. Changes include:

- LED headlights plus LED DRLs as standard. Option for the LED High-Performance headlamps or the Multibeam LED headlights with Ultra Range High Beam units.
- Can be equipped with the 12.3-inch infotainment display and a 10.25-inch free-standing infotainment display. Smartphone integration was also added, such as Apple CarPlay.
- Semi-autonomous features such as Active Lane Assist, Active Emergency Stop Assist and Active Steering Assist. Mercedes's DISTRONIC feature uses satellite data to control the cruising speed.
- An updated interior design, with silver elements. The car also got new colour options for the interior, namely, Magma Grey, Black and Saddle Brown.
- The steering wheel now features touchpads for controlling both displays, and the optional centre console touchpad now features haptic feedback.
- New Energizing comfort control system that links the climate control, air fragrance and seat heating, ventilation and massage functions.
- Three diesel models: the 148 hp C 200d, 192 hp C 220d (which arrived first) and 241 hp C 300d. Each runs Mercedes’ latest 2.0-litre four-cylinder diesel engine.
- Three petrol models feature in the line-up: the C 180, C 200 (the first to go on sale) and C 300. The C 180 uses a 1.6-litre turbo engine that produces 154 bhp in the SLC 180. The C 200 and C 300 both have Mercedes’ new four-cylinder petrol engine.
- In the C 200, the mild hybrid with EQ Boost badging, the engine delivers a nominal 181 hp, with an added 13 hp available on kick down when the alternator acts as an electric motor to boost performance.
- In the C 300, the engine is in a higher state of tune, at 255 hp, but does not have electric assistance.
- A nine-speed 9G-TRONIC transmission is expected to remain standard on all but the most basic of models.
- Due to emissions and noise regulations, the factory AMG Performance Exhaust (PE) was muted significantly on AMG C 43/63 models worldwide.
- The Mercedes-AMG C 43 uses the same 3.0-litre twin-turbo V6 engine, but gets larger turbos. Power now stands at 385 hp (23 hp more than before).
- The Mercedes-AMG C 43 Coupe' 4MATIC Special EDITION is the Limited Edition for Mercedes-Benz C-Class Coupe Produced 120 Units in Thailand.

=== Engines (2018–2021) ===
Petrol engines
Models	Engines	Power	Torque
C 160	1,595 cc (97.3 cu in) turbocharged 16V I4 (M274 DE16 LA)	129 PS (95 kW; 127 hp) at 5,000 rpm	210 N⋅m (150 lbf⋅ft) at 1,200-4,000 rpm
C 180	1,595 cc (97.3 cu in) turbocharged 16V I4 (M274 DE16 LA)	156 PS (115 kW; 154 hp) at 5,300 rpm	250 N⋅m (180 lbf⋅ft) at 1,250-4,000 rpm
C 180	1,497 cc (91.4 cu in) turbocharged 16V I4 (M264 E15 DE LA)	156 PS (115 kW; 154 hp) at 5,800-6,100 rpm	250 N⋅m (180 lbf⋅ft) at 1,500-4,000 rpm
C 200	1,497 cc (91.4 cu in) turbocharged 16V I4 (M264 E15 DEH LA) + 48V Electric Motor (MHEV)	184 PS (135 kW; 181 hp) + 14 PS (10 kW; 14 hp) at 5,800-6,100 rpm	280 N⋅m (210 lbf⋅ft) at 3,000-4,000 rpm
C 200 4MATIC	1,497 cc (91.4 cu in) turbocharged 16V I4 (M264 E15 DEH LA) + 48V Electric Motor (MHEV)	184 PS (135 kW; 181 hp) + 14 PS (10 kW; 14 hp) at 5,800-6,100 rpm	280 N⋅m (210 lbf⋅ft) at 3,000-4,000 rpm
C 300	1,991 cc (121.5 cu in) turbocharged 16V I4 (M264 E20 DEH LA) + 48V Electric Motor (MHEV)	258 PS (190 kW; 254 hp) + 14 PS (10 kW; 14 hp) at 5,500 rpm	370 N⋅m (270 lbf⋅ft) at 1,800-4,000 rpm
C 300 4MATIC	1,991 cc (121.5 cu in) turbocharged 16V I4 (M264 E20 DEH LA) + 48V Electric Motor (MHEV)	258 PS (190 kW; 254 hp) + 14 PS (10 kW; 14 hp) at 5,500 rpm	370 N⋅m (270 lbf⋅ft) at 1,800-4,000 rpm
C 400 4MATIC	2,996 cc (182.8 cu in) twin-turbo 24V V6 (M276 DE30 LA)	333 PS (245 kW; 328 hp) at 5,250-6,000 rpm	480 N⋅m (350 lbf⋅ft) at 1,400-4,000 rpm
AMG C 43 4MATIC	2,996 cc (182.8 cu in) twin-turbo 24V V6 (M276 DE30 LA)	390 PS (290 kW; 380 hp) at 6,100 rpm	520 N⋅m (380 lbf⋅ft) at 2,500-5,000 rpm
AMG C 63	3,982 cc (243.0 cu in) twin-turbo 32V V8 (M177 DE40 LA)	476 PS (350 kW; 469 hp) at 5,500-6,250 rpm	650 N⋅m (480 lbf⋅ft) at 1,750-4,500 rpm
AMG C 63 S	3,982 cc (243.0 cu in) twin-turbo 32V V8 (M177 DE40 LA)	510 PS (380 kW; 500 hp) at 5,500-6,250 rpm	700 N⋅m (520 lbf⋅ft) at 1,750-4,500 rpm

Diesel engines
Models	Engines	Power	Torque
C 180d	1,597 cc (97.5 cu in) turbocharged 16V I4 (OM654 DE16 G SCR red.)	122 PS (90 kW; 120 hp) at 3,200-4,600 rpm	300 N⋅m (220 lbf⋅ft) at 1,400-2,800 rpm
C 200d	1,597 cc (97.5 cu in) turbocharged 16V I4 (OM654 DE16 G SCR)	160 PS (120 kW; 160 hp) at 3,200-4,800 rpm	360 N⋅m (270 lbf⋅ft) at 1,600-2,600 rpm
C 200d	1,950 cc (119 cu in) turbocharged 16V I4 (OM654 DE20 SCR)	150 PS (110 kW; 150 hp) at 3,200-4,800 rpm	360 N⋅m (270 lbf⋅ft) at 1,400-2,800 rpm
C 220d	1,950 cc (119 cu in) turbocharged 16V I4 (OM654 DE20 SCR)	194 PS (143 kW; 191 hp) at 3,000-4,200 rpm	400 N⋅m (300 lbf⋅ft) at 1,400-2,800 rpm
C 220d 4MATIC	1,950 cc (119 cu in) turbocharged 16V I4 (OM654 DE20 SCR)	194 PS (143 kW; 191 hp) at 3,000-4,200 rpm	400 N⋅m (300 lbf⋅ft) at 1,400-2,800 rpm
C 300d	1,950 cc (119 cu in) twin-turbo 16V I4 (OM654 DE20 SCR)	245 PS (180 kW; 242 hp) at 4,200 rpm	500 N⋅m (370 lbf⋅ft) at 1,600-2,400 rpm
C 300d 4MATIC	1,950 cc (119 cu in) twin-turbo 16V I4 (OM654 DE20 SCR)	245 PS (180 kW; 242 hp) at 4,200 rpm	500 N⋅m (370 lbf⋅ft) at 1,600-2,400 rpm

Hybrid engines
Models	Engines	Power	Torque
C 300e	1,991 cc (121.5 cu in) turbocharged 16V I4 (M274 DE20 LA) + Electric Motor (PHEV)	211 PS (155 kW; 208 hp) + 122 PS (90 kW; 120 hp) at 5,500 rpm	350 N⋅m (260 lbf⋅ft) + 440 N⋅m (320 lbf⋅ft) at 1,200-4,000 rpm
C 300e 4MATIC	1,991 cc (121.5 cu in) turbocharged 16V I4 (M274 DE20 LA) + Electric Motor (PHEV)	211 PS (155 kW; 208 hp) + 122 PS (90 kW; 120 hp) at 5,500 rpm	350 N⋅m (260 lbf⋅ft) + 440 N⋅m (320 lbf⋅ft) at 1,200-4,000 rpm
C 300de	1,950 cc (119 cu in) turbocharged 16V I4 (OM654 DE20 SCR) + Electric Motor (PHEV)	194 PS (143 kW; 191 hp) + 122 PS (90 kW; 120 hp) at 3,000-4,200 rpm	400 N⋅m (300 lbf⋅ft) + 440 N⋅m (320 lbf⋅ft) at 1,400-2,800 rpm

=== Transmissions (2018–2021) ===
Petrol engines
Models	Production years	Standard	Optional
C 160	2018–2019	6-speed manual	9G-TRONIC
C 180	2018–2021	6-speed manual (2018–2020) 9G-TRONIC (2020–2021)	9G-TRONIC (2018–2020)
C 200	2018–2021	9G-TRONIC	-
C 200 4MATIC	2018–2021	9G-TRONIC	-
C 300	2018–2021	9G-TRONIC	-
C 300 4MATIC	2018–2021	9G-TRONIC	-
C 400 4MATIC	2018–2021	9G-TRONIC	-
AMG C 43 4MATIC	2018–2021	AMG SPEEDSHIFT TCT 9-speed	-
AMG C 63	2018–2020	AMG SPEEDSHIFT MCT 9-speed	-
AMG C 63 S	2018–2021	AMG SPEEDSHIFT MCT 9-speed	-

Diesel engines
Models	Production years	Standard	Optional
C 180d	2018–2021	6-speed manual	9G-TRONIC
C 200d	2018–2021	6-speed manual	9G-TRONIC
C 220d	2018–2021	9G-TRONIC	-
C 220d 4MATIC	2018–2021	9G-TRONIC	-
C 300d	2018–2021	9G-TRONIC	-
C 300d 4MATIC	2018–2021	9G-TRONIC	-

Hybrid engines
Models	Production years	Standard	Optional
C 300e	2019–2021	9G-TRONIC	-
C 300e 4MATIC	2019–2021	9G-TRONIC	-
C 300de	2019–2021	9G-TRONIC	-

== Safety ==
IIHS scores (2020 model)
Small overlap frontal offset	Good
Moderate overlap frontal offset	Good
Side impact	Good
Roof strength	Good
Headlights
Halogen	Good
LED	Good
Adaptive LED	Good

ANCAP test results* Mercedes-Benz C-Class C220 BlueTEC, C250 BlueTEC, C200, and C250 variants (2013)
Test	Score
Overall	5 /5 stars
Frontal offset	15.46/16
Side impact	16/16
Pole	2/2
Seat belt reminders	3/3
Whiplash protection	Good
Pedestrian protection	Good
Electronic stability control	Standard

ANCAP test results* Mercedes-Benz C-Class Cabriolet all 2WD C200 & C300 variants (2017, aligned with Euro NCAP)
Test	Points	%
Overall:	5 /5 stars	
Adult occupant:	32.1	84%
Child occupant:	38.8	79%
Pedestrian:	27.8	66%
Safety assist:	6.4	53%

== See also ==
- Mercedes-AMG C-Coupé DTM
