= NOx adsorber =

A NO_{x} adsorber or NO_{x} trap (also called Lean NO_{x} trap, abbr. LNT) is a device that is used to reduce oxides of nitrogen (NO and NO_{2}) emissions from a lean burn internal combustion engine by means of adsorption.

== Purpose and function of a NO_{x} adsorber ==
A NO_{x} adsorber is designed to reduce oxides of nitrogen emitted in the exhaust gas of a lean burn internal combustion engine. Lean burn engines, particularly diesels, present a special challenge to emission control system designers because of the relatively high levels of O_{2} (atmospheric oxygen) in the exhaust gas. The three-way catalytic converter that has been successfully used since the 1980s on stoichiometric engines (such as fueled by petrol, LPG, CNG, or ethanol) will not function at O_{2} levels in excess of 1.0%, and does not function well at levels above 0.5%. Because of the increasing need to limit NO_{x} emissions from diesel engines, technologies such as exhaust gas recirculation (EGR) and selective catalytic reduction (SCR) have been used, however EGR is of limited effectiveness and SCR requires a continuous supply of reductant to the exhaust.

The NO_{x} adsorber was designed to avoid the problems that EGR and SCR experienced. An adsorbent such as zeolite traps the NO and NO_{2} molecules—acting as a molecular sponge. Once the trap is full (like a sponge full of water) no more NO_{x} can be absorbed. Various schemes have been designed to "purge" or "regenerate" the trap. Normally the engine is operated for a short time in rich mode and produces CO as reactant. Another possible reactants used to this aim is diesel fuel. Injection of diesel fuel before the adsorber can purge it—the NO_{x} is made to desorb and react with hydrocarbons under rich conditions to produce water and nitrogen. Also hydrogen is a good reductant, but is dangerous and difficult to store. Some experimental systems have used fuel reformers for on-board hydrogen generation.

== Market use ==
A NO_{x} trap is used on the Volkswagen Jetta TDI and the Volkswagen Tiguan concepts. Both are projected to be introduced into the American market by 2008. They were to be marketed as part of the BlueTec program from Audi, Daimler-Chrysler, and Volkswagen.

In 2015 an ADAC study (ordered by ICCT) of 32 Euro6 cars showed that few complied with on-road emission limits, and LNT cars had the highest emissions.

== Technical details ==
The NO_{x} adsorber is based on a monolithic catalyst support that has been coated with a NO_{x} adsorbing washcoat such as one containing zeolites. Alkali/alkaline oxide (carbonate) can also be used as the adsorbant.

Traps are gradually poisoned by SO_{x} which adsorbs more strongly than NO_{x}. It necessitates a periodic high temperature regeneration that tends to reduce the adsorber's operating life.
