= Selective catalytic reduction =

Chemical process

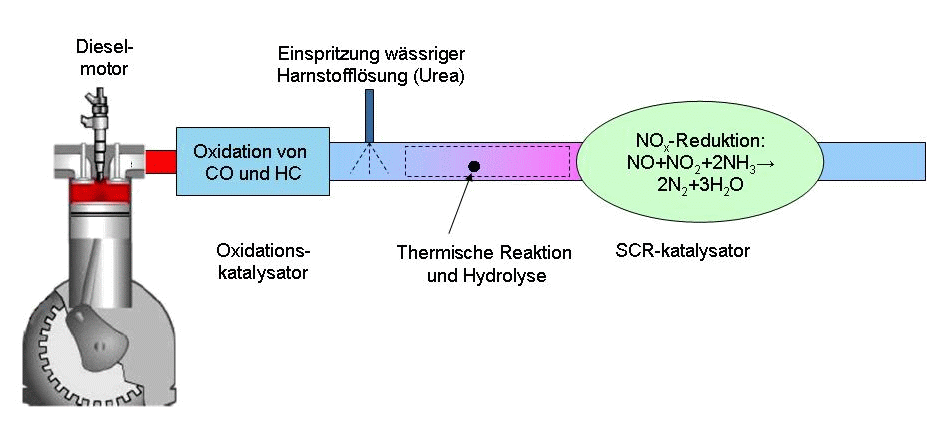
Catalytic reduction

Selective catalytic reduction (SCR) means converting nitrogen oxides, also referred to as NO_{x} with the aid of a catalyst into diatomic nitrogen (N_{2}), and water (H_{2}O). A reductant, typically anhydrous ammonia (NH_{3}), aqueous ammonia (NH_{4}OH), or a urea (CO(NH_{2})_{2}) solution, is added to a stream of flue or exhaust gas and is reacted onto a catalyst. As the reaction drives toward completion, nitrogen (N_{2}), and carbon dioxide (CO_{2}), in the case of urea use, are produced.

Selective catalytic reduction of NO_{x} using ammonia as the reducing agent was patented in the United States by the Engelhard Corporation in 1957. Development of SCR technology continued in Japan and the US in the early 1960s with research focusing on less expensive and more durable catalyst agents. The first large-scale SCR was installed by the IHI Corporation in 1978.

Commercial selective catalytic reduction systems are typically found on large utility boilers, industrial boilers, and municipal solid waste boilers and have been shown to lower NO_{x} emissions by 70-95%. Applications include diesel engines, such as those found on large ships, diesel locomotives, gas turbines, and automobiles.

SCR systems are now the preferred method for meeting Tier 4 Final and EURO 6 diesel emissions standards for heavy trucks, cars and light commercial vehicles. As a result, emissions of NOx, particulates, and hydrocarbons have been lowered by as much as 95% when compared with pre-emissions engines.

== Chemistry ==
The NO_{x} reduction reaction takes place as the gases pass through the catalyst chamber. Before entering the catalyst chamber, ammonia, or other reductant (such as urea), is injected and mixed with the gases. The intended equations for the reactions using ammonia for a SCR are:

$$\ce{2 NO + 2 NH3 + 1/2 O2 -> 2 N2 + 3 H2O}$$
$$\ce{NO2 + 2 NH3 + 1/2 O2 -> 3/2 N2 + 3 H2O}$$
$$\ce{NO + NO2 + 2 NH3 -> 2 N2 + 3 H2O}$$

Several secondary reactions also occur:

$$\ce{1/8 S8 + O2 -> SO2}$$
$$\ce{SO2 + 1/2 O2 -> SO3}$$
$$\ce{SO3 + H2O -> H2SO4}$$
$$\ce{2 NH3 + H2SO4 -> (NH4)2SO4}$$
$$\ce{NH3 + H2SO4 -> NH4HSO4}$$

With urea, the reactions are:

$$\ce{3 NO + CO(NH2)2 -> 5/2 N2 + 2 H2O + CO2}$$
$$\ce{3 NO2 + 2 CO(NH2)2 -> 7/2 N2 + 4 H2O + 2 CO2}$$

As with ammonia, several secondary reactions also occur in the presence of sulfur:

$$\ce{CO(NH2)2 + H2SO4 + H2O -> (NH4)2SO4 + CO2}$$
$$\ce{CO(NH2)2 + 2 H2SO4 + H2O -> 2 NH4HSO4 + CO2}$$

The ideal reaction has an optimal temperature range between 630 and 720 K (357 and 447 °C) but can operate as low as 500 K (227 °C) with longer residence times. The minimum effective temperature depends on the fuels, gas constituents, and catalyst. Other possible reductants include cyanuric acid and ammonium sulfate.

== Catalysts ==
SCR catalysts are made from various porous ceramic materials used as a support, such as titanium oxide, and active catalytic components are usually either oxides (of vanadium, molybdenum and tungsten), zeolites, or cerium.

Base metal catalysts, such as vanadium and tungsten, lack high thermal durability, but are less expensive and operate very well at the temperature ranges most commonly applied in industrial and utility boiler applications. Thermal durability is particularly important for automotive SCR applications that incorporate the use of a diesel particulate filter with forced regeneration. They also have a high catalysing potential to oxidize SO_{2} into SO_{3}, which can be extremely damaging due to its acidic properties.

Zeolite catalysts have the potential to operate at substantially higher temperature than base metal catalysts; they can withstand prolonged operation at temperatures of 900 K (627 °C) and transient conditions of up to 1120 K (847 °C). Zeolites also have a lower potential for SO_{2} oxidation and thus decrease the related corrosion risks.

Iron- and copper-exchanged zeolite urea SCRs have been developed with approximately equal performance to that of vanadium-urea SCRs if the fraction of the NO_{2} is 20% to 50% of the total NO_{x}. The two most common catalyst geometries used today are honeycomb catalysts and plate catalysts. The honeycomb form usually consists of an extruded ceramic applied homogeneously throughout the carrier or coated on the substrate. Like the various types of catalysts, their configuration also has advantages and disadvantages. Plate-type catalysts have lower pressure drops and are less susceptible to plugging and fouling than the honeycomb types, but are much larger and more expensive. Honeycomb configurations are smaller than plate types, but have higher pressure drops and plug much more easily. A third type is corrugated, comprising only about 10% of the market in power plant applications.

== Reductants ==
Several nitrogen-bearing reductants are used in SCR applications including anhydrous ammonia, aqueous ammonia or dissolved urea. All those three reductants are widely available in large quantities.

Anhydrous ammonia can be stored as a liquid at approximately 10 bar in steel tanks. It is classified as an inhalation hazard, but it can be safely stored and handled if well-developed codes and standards are followed. Its advantage is that it needs no further conversion to operate within a SCR and is typically favoured by large industrial SCR operators. Aqueous ammonia must be first vaporized in order to be used, but it is substantially safer to store and transport than anhydrous ammonia. Urea is the safest to store, but requires conversion to ammonia through thermal decomposition. At the end of the process, the purified exhaust gasses are sent to the boiler or condenser or other equipment, or discharged into the atmosphere.

== Limitations ==
Most catalysts have finite service life mainly due to the formation of ammonium sulfate and ammonium bisulfate from sulfur compounds when high-sulfur fuels are used, as well as the undesirable catalyst-induced oxidation of SO_{2} to SO_{3} and H_{2}SO_{4}. In applications that use exhaust gas boilers, ammonium sulfate and ammonium bisulfate can accumulate on the boiler tubes, inhibiting steam output and increasing exhaust back-pressure. In marine applications, this can increase fresh water requirements as the boiler must be continuously washed to remove the deposits.

Most catalysts on the market have porous structures and geometries optimized for increasing their specific surface area (a clay planting pot is a good example of what SCR catalyst feels like). This porosity is what gives the catalyst the high surface area needed for reduction of NOx. However, soot, ammonium sulfate, ammonium bisulfate, silica compounds, and other fine particulates can easily clog the pores. Ultrasonic horns and soot blowers can remove most of these contaminants while the unit is online. The unit can also be cleaned by being washed with water or by raising the exhaust temperature.

Of more concern to SCR performance are poisons, which will chemically degrade the catalyst itself and render it ineffective at NO_{x} reduction, and in severe cases this can result in the ammonia or urea being oxidized and a subsequent increase in NO_{x} emissions. These poisons are alkali metals, alkaline earth metals, halogens, phosphorus, sulfur, arsenic, antimony, chromium, heavy metals (copper, cadmium, mercury, thallium, and lead), and many heavy metal compounds (e.g. oxides and halides).

Catalyst management strategies can include catalyst replacement and catalyst rejuvenation (removal of pluggage and poisons) and regeneration (replenishment of materials).

Most SCRs require tuning to properly perform. Part of tuning involves ensuring a proper distribution of ammonia in the gas stream and uniform gas velocity through the catalyst. Without tuning, SCRs can exhibit inefficient NOx reduction along with excessive ammonia slip due to not utilizing the catalyst surface area effectively. Another facet of tuning involves determining the proper ammonia flow for all process conditions. Ammonia flow is in general controlled based on NOx measurements taken from the gas stream or preexisting performance curves from an engine manufacturer (in the case of gas turbines and reciprocating engines). Typically, all future operating conditions must be known beforehand to properly design and tune an SCR system.

Ammonia slip is an industry term for ammonia passing through the SCR unreacted. This occurs when ammonia is injected in excess, temperatures are too low for ammonia to react, or the catalyst has been poisoned.

In applications using both SCR and an alkaline scrubber, the use of high-sulfur fuels also tend to significantly increase ammonia slip, since compounds such as NaOH and Ca(OH)_{2} will reduce ammonium sulfate and ammonium bisulfate back into ammonia:

$$\ce{2 OH- + NH4HSO4 -> NH3 + SO4^2- + 2 H2O}$$
$$\ce{2 OH- + (NH4)2SO4 -> 2 NH3 + SO4^2- + 2 H2O}$$

Temperature is SCR's largest limitation. Engines all have a period during start-up where exhaust temperatures are too low, and the catalyst must be pre-heated for the desired NOx reduction to occur when an engine is first started, especially in cold climates.

== Power plants ==
In power stations, the same basic technology is employed for removal of NO_{x} from the flue gas of boilers used in power generation and industry. In general, the SCR unit is located between the furnace economizer and the air heater, and the ammonia is injected into the catalyst chamber through an ammonia injection grid. As in other SCR applications, the temperature of operation is critical. Ammonia slip (unreacted ammonia) is also an issue with SCR technology used in power plants.

A significant operational difficulty in coal-fired boilers is the binding of the catalyst by fly ash from the fuel combustion. This requires the usage of sootblowers, ultrasonic horns, and careful design of the ductwork and catalyst materials to avoid plugging by the fly ash. SCR catalysts have a typical operational lifetime of about 16,000 – 40,000 hours (1.8 – 4.5 years) in coal-fired power plants, depending on the flue gas composition, and up to 80,000 hours (9 years) in cleaner gas-fired power plants.

Poisons, sulfur compounds, and fly ash can all be removed by installing scrubbers before the SCR system to increase the life of the catalyst, though in most power plants and marine engines, scrubbers are installed after the system to maximize the SCR system's effectiveness.

== Automobiles ==
=== History ===
SCR was applied to trucks by Nissan Diesel Corporation, and the first practical product "Nissan Diesel Quon" was introduced in 2004 in Japan.

In 2007, the United States Environmental Protection Agency (EPA) enacted requirements to significantly lower harmful exhaust emissions. To achieve this standard, Cummins and other diesel engine manufacturers developed an aftertreatment system that includes the use of a diesel particulate filter (DPF). As the DPF does not function with low-sulfur diesel fuel, diesel engines that conform to 2007 EPA emissions standards require ultra-low sulfur diesel fuel (ULSD) to prevent damage to the DPF. After a brief transition period, ULSD fuel became common at fuel pumps in the United States and Canada. The 2007 EPA regulations were meant to be an interim solution to allow manufacturers time to prepare for the more stringent 2010 EPA regulations, which lowers NOx levels even further.

=== 2010 EPA regulations ===
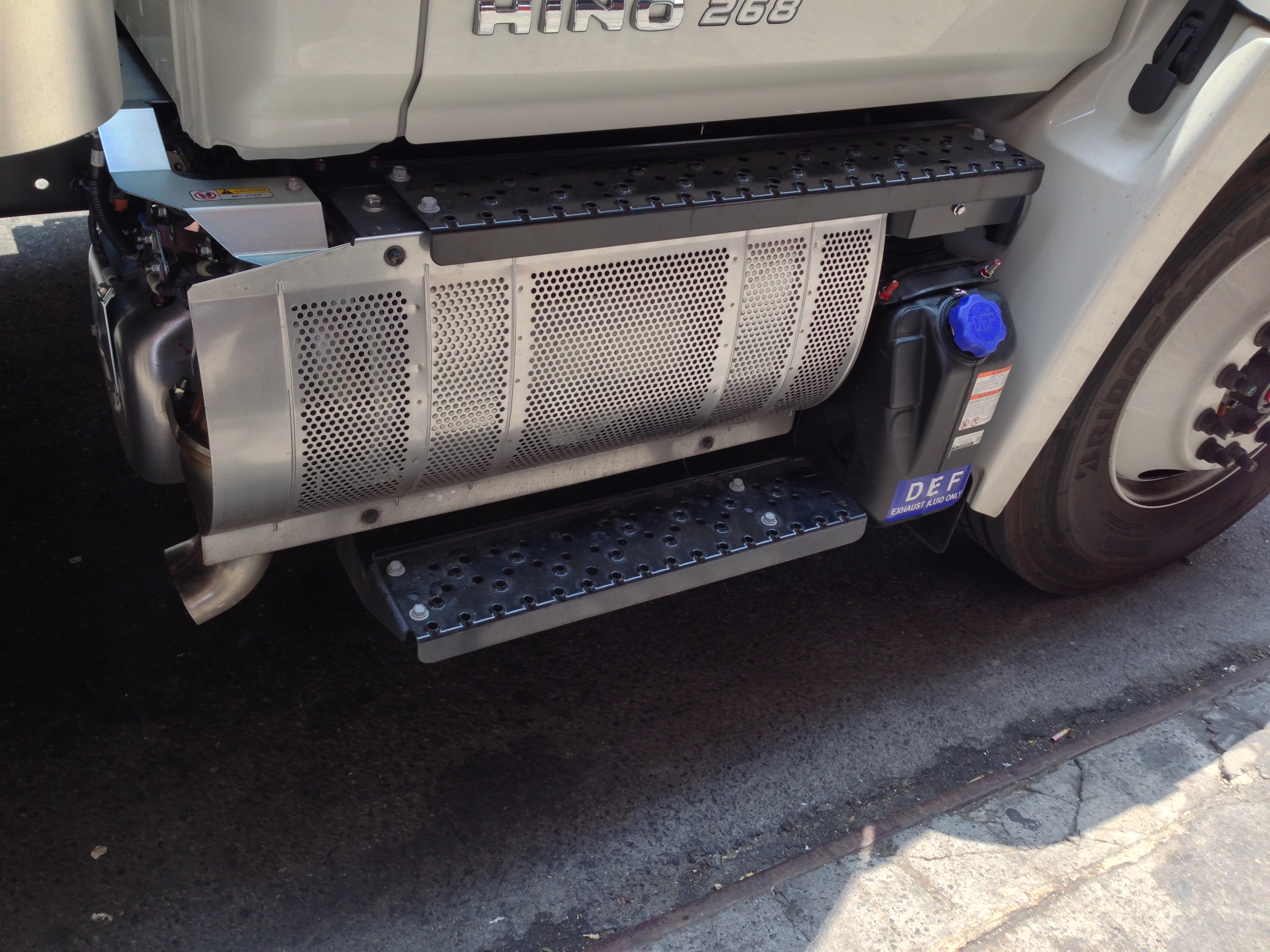
Hino truck and its Standardized SCR Unit which combines SCR with Diesel Particulate Active Reduction (DPR). DPR is a diesel particulate filtration system with regeneration process that uses late fuel injection to control exhaust temperature to burn off soot.

Diesel engines manufactured after January 1, 2010 are required to meet lowered NOx standards for the US market.

All of the heavy-duty engine (Class 7-8 trucks) manufacturers except for Navistar International and Caterpillar continuing to manufacture engines after this date have chosen to use SCR. This includes Detroit Diesel (DD13, DD15, and DD16 models), Cummins (ISX, ISL9, and ISB6.7), Paccar, and Volvo/Mack. These engines require the periodic addition of diesel exhaust fluid (DEF, a urea solution) to enable the process. DEF is available in bottles and jugs from most truck stops, and a more recent development is bulk DEF dispensers near diesel fuel pumps. Caterpillar and Navistar had initially chosen to use enhanced exhaust gas recirculation (EEGR) to comply with the Environmental Protection Agency (EPA) standards, but in July 2012 Navistar announced it would be pursuing SCR technology for its engines, except on the MaxxForce 15 which was to be discontinued. Caterpillar ultimately withdrew from the on-highway engine market prior to implementation of these requirements.

BMW, Daimler AG (as BlueTEC), and Volkswagen have used SCR technology in some of their passenger diesel cars.

== See also ==
- Acid rain
- Catalytic converter, which also catalyzes NO_{x} conversion but does not use urea or ammonia
- Diesel exhaust fluid (DEF) or AdBlue
- Exhaust gas recirculation versus selective catalytic reduction
- Environmental engineering
- Selective non-catalytic reduction (SNCR)
- NOx adsorber (LNT)
- Vehicle emissions control
