= BlueTEC =

Marketing name by Mercedes-Benz Group

BlueTEC is Mercedes-Benz Group's marketing name for engines equipped with advanced NO_{x} reducing technology for vehicle emissions control in diesel-powered vehicles. The technology in BlueTec vehicles includes a selective catalytic reduction (SCR) system that uses diesel exhaust fluid, and a system of NOx adsorbers the automaker calls DeNO_{x}, which uses an oxidizing catalytic converter and diesel particulate filter combined with other NO_{x} reducing systems.

The BlueTEC was on the Ward's 10 Best Engines list for 2007 and 2008.

In February 2016, Mercedes-Benz, Daimler AG, Bosch LLC and Bosch GmbH were sued by private plaintiffs alleging BlueTec violates standards in a manner similar to the Volkswagen emissions scandal. On December 6, 2016, U.S. District Judge Jose L. Linares dismissed the lawsuit without prejudice, finding the plaintiffs had alleged no standing. The case was reinstated after Plaintiffs amended the complaint, and the litigation is ongoing. On July 12, 2021, the court granted final approval to the proposed class action settlement, which includes cash payments to previous and current owners, free retrofits to the cars' emissions systems, and extended emissions systems warranties for the affected models. A similar settlement was reached in Canada on February 2, 2022.

== Uses ==
Daimler introduced BlueTEC in the Mercedes E-Class (using the DeNO_{x} system) and GL-Class (using SCR) at the 2006 North American International Auto Show. At that time, these BlueTEC vehicles were 45- and 50-state legal, respectively, in the United States (a 45-state vehicle does not meet the more stringent California emission standards that have also been adopted by four other states).

Daimler AG has entered into an agreement with Volkswagen and Audi to share BlueTEC technology with them in order to increase the Diesel passenger-vehicle market in the United States. VW introduced the Jetta Clean TDI, the Tiguan concept, and the Touareg BlueTDI as part of the BlueTec licensing program. The Jetta and the Tiguan use NOx adsorbers, while the Touareg uses a Selective Catalytic Reduction catalytic converter.

In August 2007 VW Group announced that cooperation on BlueTEC with Daimler AG would end. The reasoning for this change is due to the recognition of the VW TDI branding. VW did not want to use a competitor's branding for a product they would introduce into the market. VW developed their own system, but it failed and they re-programmed the engine control to show false values during pollution tests.

By 2010 a BlueTEC version of the Mercedes Sprinter was released. The BlueTEC systems allowed the elimination of much of the EGR in that vehicle's engine, which as a result gives 188 horsepower (140 kilowatts) compared to the non-BlueTec engine's 154 horsepower (115 kilowatts).

== Rationale ==
The BlueTEC system was created because diesel engines, while more fuel efficient than gasoline engines, operate at lean air-fuel ratios, preventing them from implementing the highly-efficient three-way catalysts employed for NO_{x} conversion in gasoline engines, which operate at stoichiometric air-fuel ratios. Limiting NO_{x} by use of engine controls alone is possible, but requires a significant penalty to fuel economy. Tier 2 regulations in the US are 0.07 grams per mile of NOx, which is one eighth of the 0.40 limit in the European Union.

== Process ==
The emissions system works in a series of steps:

1. A diesel oxidation catalyst reduces the amounts of carbon monoxide (CO) and hydrocarbons (HC) released from the exhaust.
2. A DeNO_{x} catalytic converter begins a preliminary removal of oxides of nitrogen.
3. A particulate filter traps and stores soot particles, burning them off when the filter gets full.
4. If the above are not sufficient to meet the prevailing emissions regulations, a Selective Catalytic Reduction (SCR) catalytic converter will convert the remaining nitrogen oxides to nitrogen and water; so-called diesel exhaust fluid (solution of urea and water) is injected into the exhaust gas stream to enable the conversion. In order to prevent vehicles from breaking emissions regulations, the engine may go into a limp-home-mode if the DEF tank is depleted; drivers are instructed to keep the tank refilled as necessary. Some commercial vehicles are equipped with a request or inhibit switch which allows the DEF injection to be "postponed" as it can reduce power output and increase temperatures temporarily; if the vehicle is climbing a grade, for example, it may be necessary to delay the cycle.

== Emissions defeat device allegations ==
The Netherlands' official automobile inspector TNO, on behalf of the Dutch Minister of the Environment, conducted an on-road test of a C-Class Mercedes C220 CDi BlueTec diesel and determined it emitted more than 40 times the amount of cancer-causing NO_{x} than in the lab test. The tests were done at temperatures below 10 degrees Celsius (50 °F). Mercedes says it is permissible for the BlueTec engine to emit 40 times more NO_{x} when the temperature is less than 10 °C (50 °F).

As of April 22, 2016, Mercedes-Benz USA disclosed it is under investigation by the Department of Justice for potential discrepancies over its diesel emissions certifications, according to a Daimler statement. The DOJ effectively told MBUSA to begin an internal investigation "to review its certification and admissions process related to exhaust emissions in the United States," Daimler said. The company "has agreed to cooperate fully with the DOJ."

In Feb 2018, German newspaper Bild am Sonntag reported that US authorities investigating Mercedes have discovered that its vehicles are equipped with illegal software to help them pass United States' stringent emission tests. The claimed defeat devices include a "Bit 15" mode to switch off emissions after 16 miles (26 km) of driving (the length of an official U.S. emissions test), and "Slipguard" which tries to directly determine if the car is being tested based on speed and acceleration profiles. Bild am Sonntag said it found emails from Daimler engineers questioning whether those functions were legal.
