= Leapmotor D19 =

Full-size luxury SUV

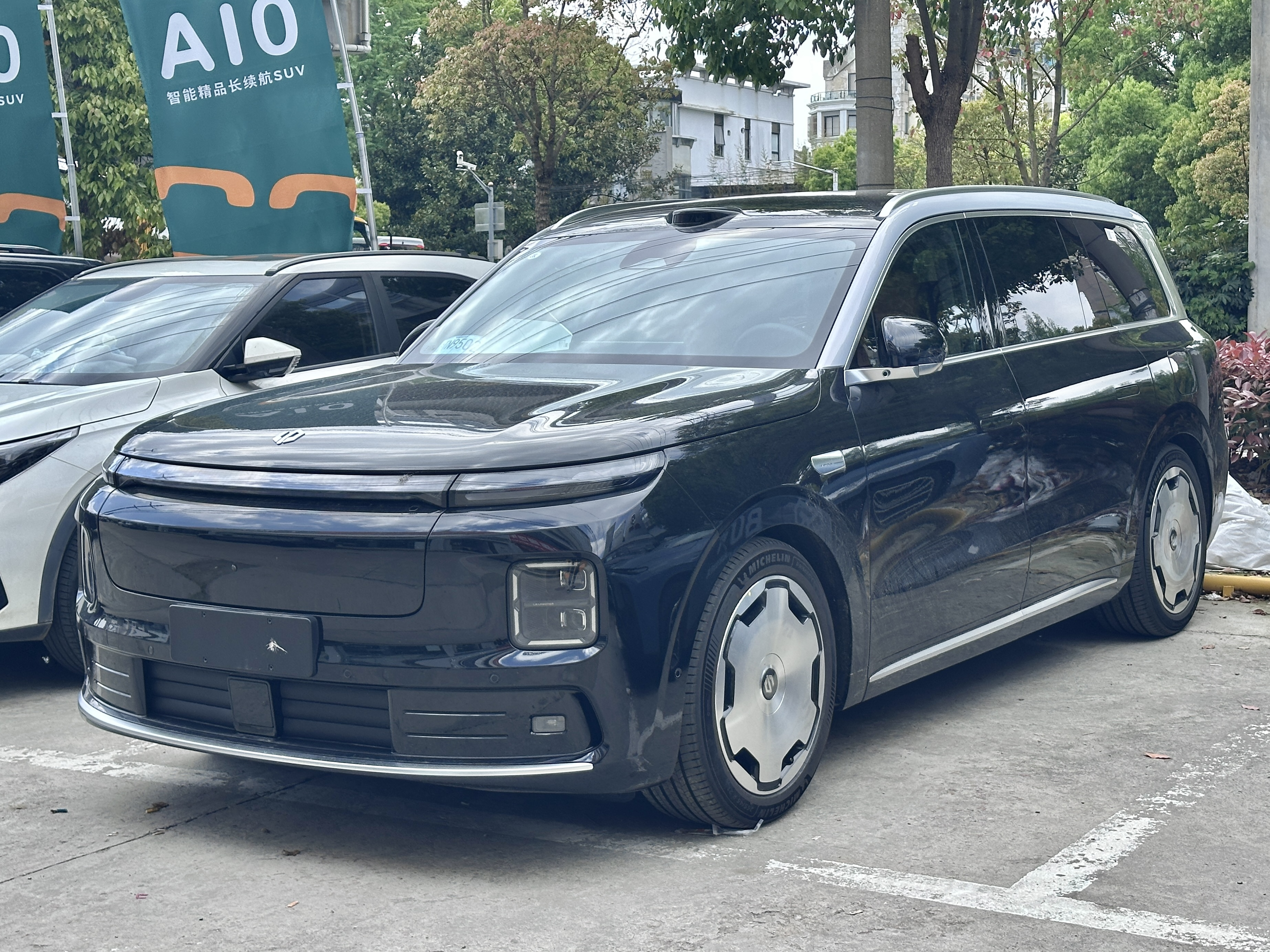

Overview
- Manufacturer: Leapmotor
- Production: 2026–present
- Assembly: China: Jinhua, Zhejiang

Body and chassis
- Class: Full-size luxury SUV
- Body style: 5-door SUV
- Layout: Battery electric: Tri-motor, all-wheel-drive; Range-extended EV: Front-engine, dual-motor, all-wheel-drive
- Platform: LEAP 4.0
- Related: Leapmotor D99

Powertrain
- Engine: Petrol range extender: 1.5 L BHE15-GFT turbo I4
- Electric motor: 180 kW YS220QY032 (EV, front); 230 kW TZ220QY033 (EV, rear)
- Power output: 724 hp (540 kW; 734 PS) (EV); 536 hp (400 kW; 543 PS) (EREV)
- Hybrid drivetrain: Series hybrid
- Battery: 115 kWh CATL Freevoy LFP-NMC (EV); 80.3 kWh 1000 V CATL (EREV)
- Electric range: 720 km (447 mi) (EV); 500 km (311 mi) CLTC (EREV)
- Plug-in charging: 800 V (EREV)

Dimensions
- Wheelbase: 3,110 mm (122.4 in)
- Length: 5,252 mm (206.8 in)
- Width: 1,995 mm (78.5 in)
- Height: 1,780–1,800 mm (70.1–70.9 in)
- Curb weight: 2,730–2,780 kg (6,019–6,129 lb)

The Leapmotor D19 (Chinese: 零跑D19; pinyin: Língpǎo D19) is a battery electric and range-extended full-size luxury SUV produced by Leapmotor. It is the first model in Leapmotor's D-series range of models.

== Overview ==
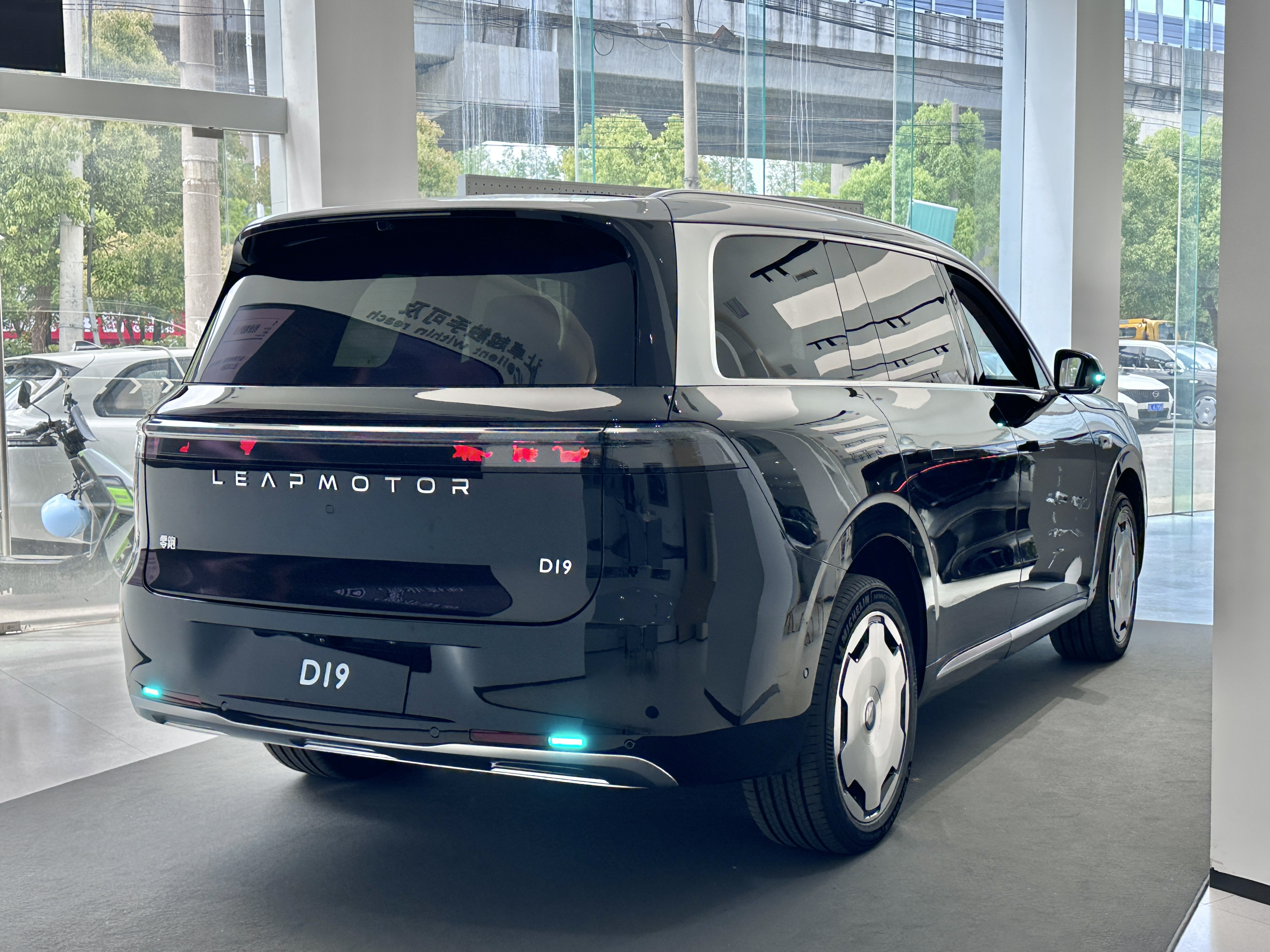
Rear view

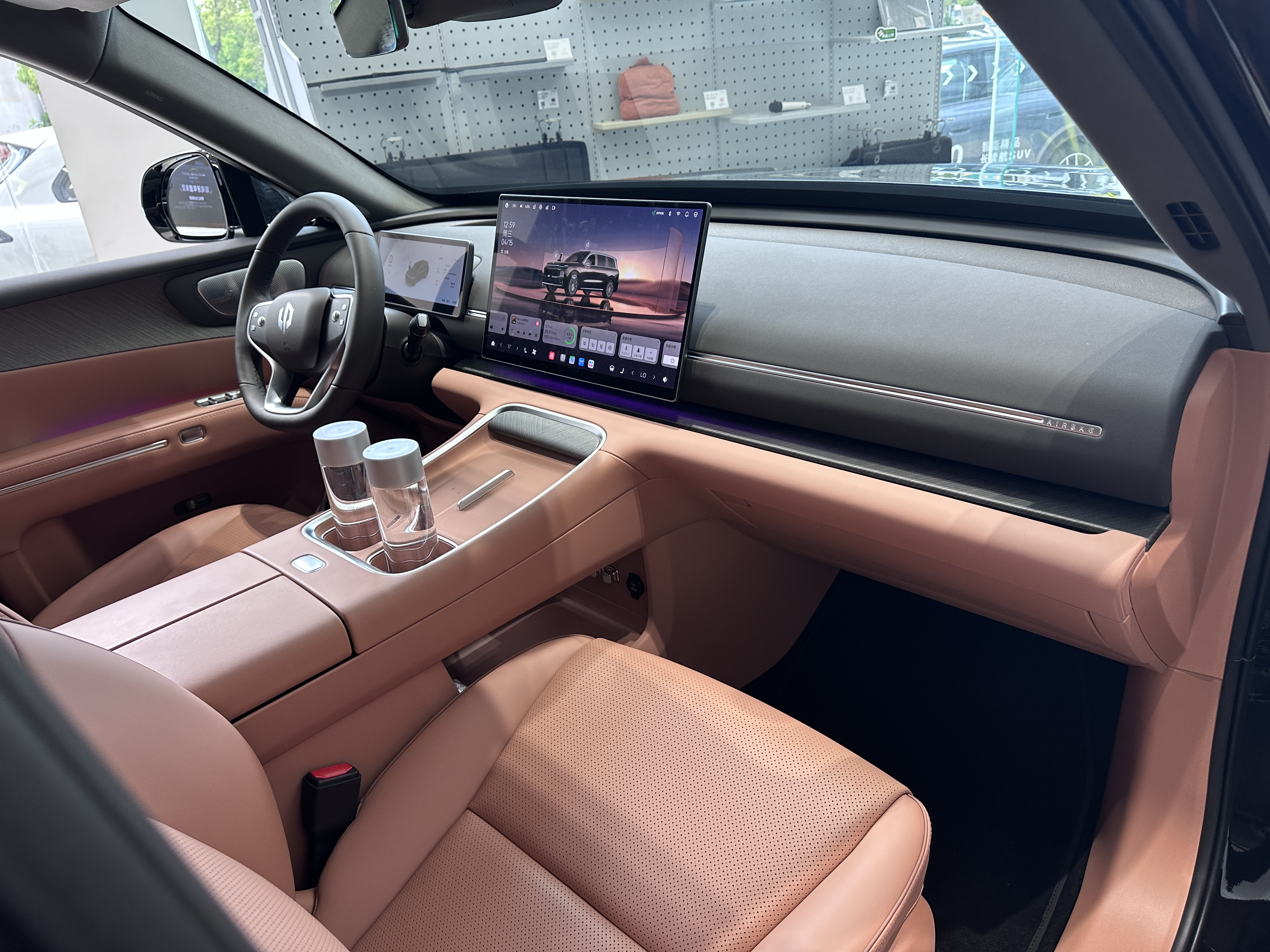
Interior

The D19 is a large SUV and expected to have 3 rows of seating. It was previously expected to launch towards the end of 2025. CarNewsChina and CarExpert have previously stated that the model was planned to be called the D16.

The D19 made its debut on October 16, 2025. It was officially launched in the first half of 2026 in April.

Desert testing for the D19 took place in Turpan, Xinjiang.

It will be Leapmotor's highest-priced model and is expected to compete with models such as the Li L9, Zeekr 9X, Geely Galaxy M9, Chery Fulwin T11, and the Onvo L80/L90. It is about as long as the BMW X7 and the Mercedes-Benz GLS. It will be offered as both a battery electric vehicle and an extended-range electric vehicle.

=== Design ===
The D19 adopts the Technology Natural Aesthetics 2.0 design language featuring a three-stage headlight cluster that can be used as a projector and a lower grille that can automatically open/close based on environmental conditions.

=== Features ===
Polygonal headlamps are placed below the front light bar. Flush door handles and large chrome wheels are also present on the D19.

It will be Leapmotor's first model to use the company's next-generation central domain controller with dual Qualcomm Snapdragon 8797 SoCs capable of a total of 1280 TOPS and comes with LiDAR as standard. One SoC will be used for the intelligent cockpit and the other will be for advanced driving assistance. As of June 2026, the highest Antutu score car in the world, double or quadruple of most other cars.

Leapmotor claims the D19 is the first production vehicle to feature an on-board oxygen generator. Maintain safety and stability after two simultaneous tyre blowouts on the same side, with six people, on a icy road at 75mph.

In the interior a 17.3-inch central touchscreen, a 10.25-inch LCD instrument cluster, and a large 60-inch high-brightness all-weather AR-HUD are present in the front row. Second row passengers have access to a 6-inch multi-function control screen and a 21.4-inch 3K screen.

The D19's chassis has a torsional rigidity of 50,500 Nm/deg. It is equipped with dual-chamber air suspension and continuous damping control.

== Powertrain ==
The D19 will be available as both a range extender and pure electric vehicle, both available in all-wheel drive.

Range extender variants use a 1.5-liter turbocharged petrol engine supplied by Horse Powertrain producing 95 kW (127 hp; 129 PS), with the exhaust system routed through the door sills to maximize space for the 80.3kWh CATL-supplied battery pack, claimed to be the world's largest ever fitted to an EREV. It has a 180 kW (241 hp; 245 PS) AC induction motor at the front and a 230 kW (308 hp; 313 PS) permanent magnet motor at the rear for a total of 536 hp (400 kW; 543 PS). Leapmotor says it has a wheel torque figure of 7,850 N⋅m (5,790 lb⋅ft; 800 kg⋅m). The vehicle uses 800V power electronics, allowing for a 30-80% charging time of 15 minutes and a pure-electric CLTC range of 500 km (311 mi). Range extended models also have a 40 liter fuel tank.

The pure electric version uses a triple-motor all-wheel drive system with an output of 724 hp (540 kW; 734 PS), making it capable of 0–100 km/h (62 mph) acceleration times under 3 seconds. Leapmotor says it has a wheel torque of 8,770 N⋅m (6,468 lb⋅ft; 894 kg⋅m). It uses a CATL-supplied 115 kWh NMC-LFP hybrid dual chemistry battery pack and 1000V power electronics for a CLTC range of 720 km (447 mi) and is capable of recharging 50% of its range within 15 minutes.
