= D99 =

D99 may refer to:

- HMS Duncan (D99)
- HMS Durban (D99)
- Greek destroyer Kountouriotis (D99)
- an ECO code for the Grünfeld Defence in chess
- slogan of XHJD-FM radio, a CHR radio station from Monterrey, Nuevo León
- D99 (New York City bus), a New York City Bus route in Brooklyn
- Leapmotor D99, a series of battery electric and range-extended full-size luxury minivans
