= Mercedes-Benz OM656 engine =

Mercedes-Benz OM656
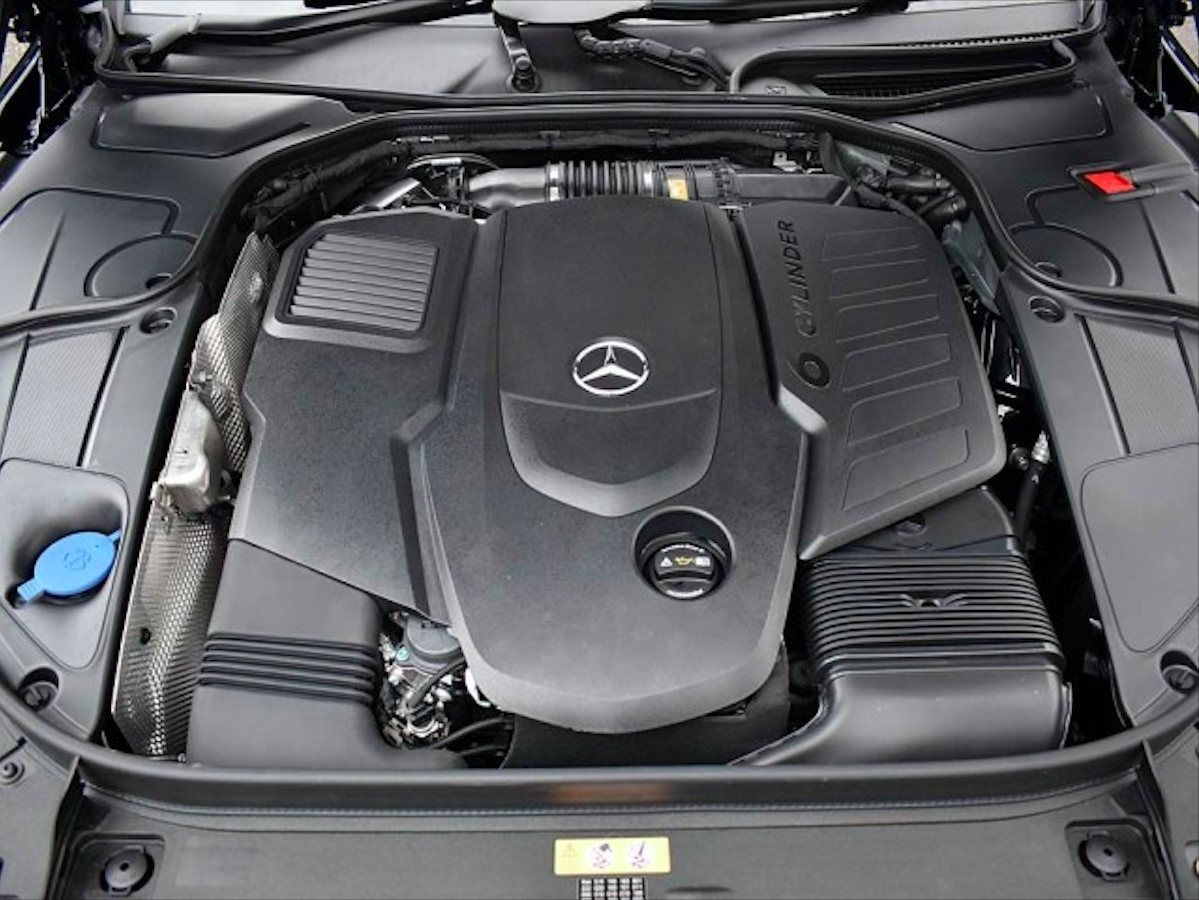

Overview
- Manufacturer: Mercedes-Benz
- Production: 2017–present

Layout
- Configuration: Straight-six engine
- Displacement: 2.9 L (2,927.8 cc), 3.0 L (2,989.8 cc)
- Cylinder bore: 82 mm (3.23 in)
- Piston stroke: 92.4 mm (3.64 in)
- Cylinder block material: Aluminium alloy
- Cylinder head material: Aluminium alloy
- Valvetrain: DOHC 4 valves x cyl. with VVL - CAMTRONIC
- Compression ratio: 15.5:1

Combustion
- Supercharger: BorgWarner eBooster electrically driven compressor
- Turbocharger: BorgWarner R2S® Biturbo (only one twin-scroll)
- Fuel system: Common rail direct injection
- Fuel type: Diesel
- Cooling system: Water cooled

Output
- Power output: 210–270 kW (282–362 hp)
- Torque output: 600–750 N⋅m (443–553 lb⋅ft)

Chronology
- Predecessor: Mercedes-Benz OM642; Mercedes-Benz OM629

The OM656 is a turbocharged diesel engine produced by Mercedes-Benz since 2017. It was first introduced in the facelift W222 S-Class.

== Design ==
The OM656 is based on a modular design that is shared with other 4-cylinder and 6-cylinder, petrol and diesel engines. It is the replacement to the previous V6, in order to maintain the cost of production between different engines. The OM656 has dual overhead camshafts with variable valve timing, and uses AdBlue injection and exhaust gas recirculation to reduce emissions. The cylinder walls are coated with arc sprayed steel whose increased porosity aids oil film strength to reduce friction.

== Models ==
| Engine | Power | Torque | Years |
|---|---|---|---|
| OM656 D29T R SCR | 210 kW (286 PS; 282 hp) at 3,400–4,600 rpm | 600–650 N⋅m (443–479 lb⋅ft) at 1,200–3,200 rpm | 2017– |
| OM656 D29T SCR | 250 kW (340 PS; 335 hp) at 3,600–4,400 rpm | 700 N⋅m (516 lb⋅ft) at 1,200–3,200 rpm | 2017– |
| OM656 D30T R M | 230 kW (313 PS; 308 hp) + 15 kW (20 PS; 20 hp) at 3,400–4,600 rpm | 650 N⋅m (479 lb⋅ft) at 1,200–3,200 rpm | 05/2023– |
| OM656 D30T M | 270 kW (367 PS; 362 hp) + 17 kW (23 PS; 23 hp) at 3,600–4,200 rpm | 750 N⋅m (553 lb⋅ft) at 1,200–3,200 rpm | 05/2023– |

=== OM656 D29T R SCR ===
- 2017–2020 W222 S 350 d
- 2018–2020 C257 CLS 350 d
- 2018–2020 W213 E 350 d
- 2018–present W463 G 350 d
- 2019–present V167 GLE 350 d
- 2020–present X167 GLS 350 d
- 2021–present W223 S 350 d

=== OM656 D29T SCR ===
- 2017–2020 W222 S 400 d
- 2018–2023 C257 CLS 400 d 4MATIC
- 2018–present W213 E 400 d 4MATIC
- 2018-present W463 G 400 d
- 2019–present V167 GLE 400 d
- 2020–present X167 GLS 400 d
- 2021–present W223 S 400 d 4MATIC

=== OM656 D30T R M ===
- 2023–present W223 S 350 d (RWD-version and 4MATIC-version)
- 2023–present X167 GLS 350 d 4MATIC

=== OM656 D30T M ===
- 2023–present X254 GLC 450 d 4MATIC
- 2023–present C254 GLC 450 d Coupe 4MATIC
- 2023–present W214 E 450 d 4MATIC
- 2023–present V167 GLE 450 d 4 MATIC
- 2023–present C167 GLE 450 d Coupe 4MATIC
- 2023–present W223 S 450 d 4MATIC
- 2023–present X167 GLS 450 d 4MATIC
- 2023–present W465 G 450 d
