= Mercedes-Benz GL-Class (X166) =

Mercedes-Benz GL-Class/GLS (X166)
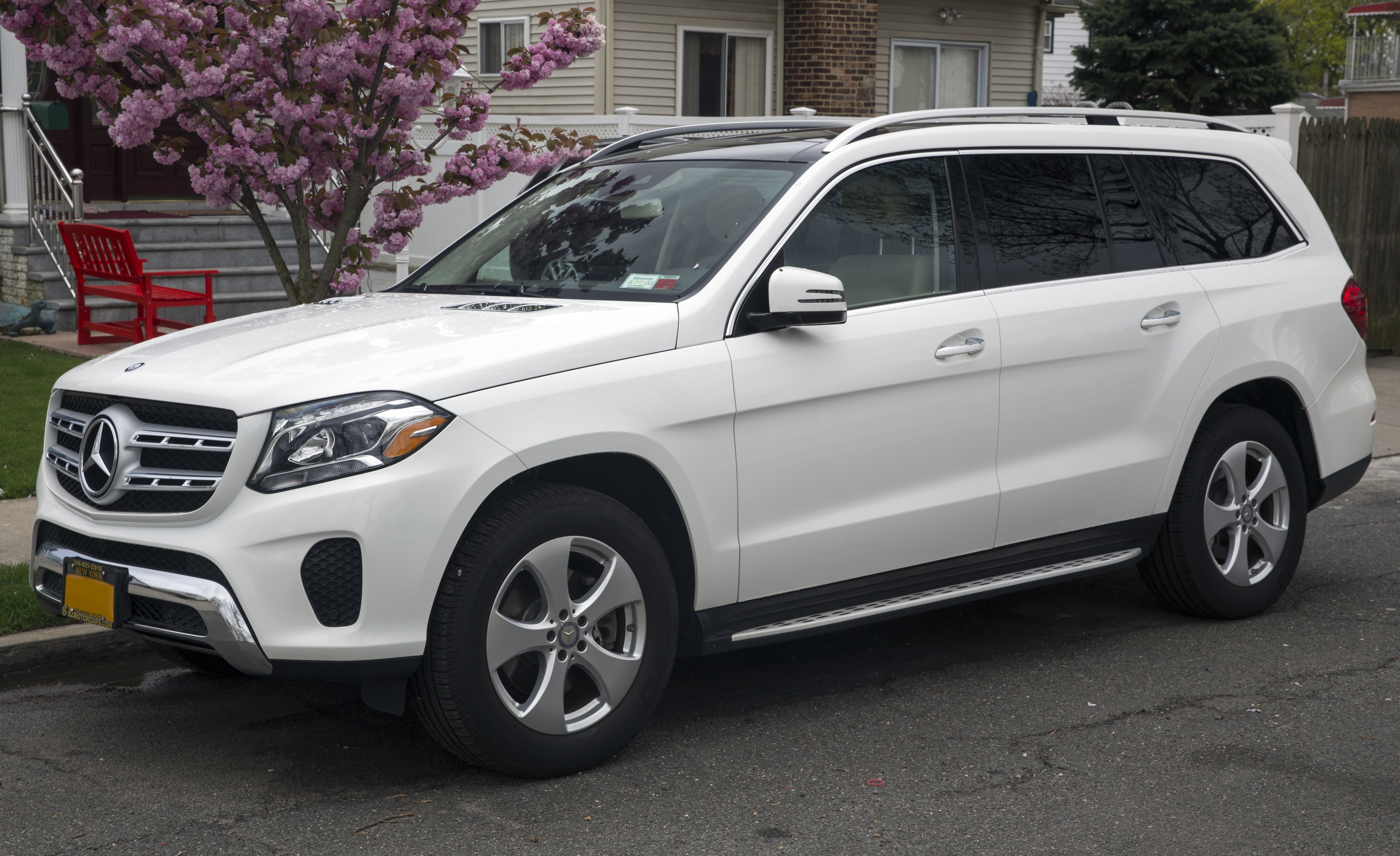
- 2017 GLS 450 wagon (facelift)

Overview
- Manufacturer: Daimler AG
- Also called: Mercedes-Benz GLS (facelift)
- Production: June 2012 – April 2019
- Model years: 2013–2019
- Assembly: United States: Vance, Alabama (MBUSI); India: Pune, Maharashtra (MBI); Indonesia: Wanaherang, Bogor Regency (U.S. CKD kits); Thailand: Samut Prakan

Body and chassis
- Class: Full-size luxury crossover SUV
- Body style: 5-door SUV
- Layout: Front-engine, four-wheel-drive (4matic)
- Platform: W164/V251/W166
- Related: Mercedes-Benz M-Class (W166) BAIC BJ90

Powertrain
- Engine: Petrol: 3.0 L M276 twin-turbo V6; 4.7 L M278 twin-turbo V8; 5.5 L M157 twin-turbo V8; Diesel: 3.0 L OM642 turbo V6
- Transmission: 7-speed 7G-Tronic automatic 9-speed 9G-Tronic automatic

Dimensions
- Wheelbase: 3,075 mm (121.1 in)
- Length: 5,125 mm (201.8 in); 5,130 mm (202.0 in) (facelift)
- Width: 1,934 mm (76.1 in)
- Height: 1,850 mm (72.8 in)
- Kerb weight: 2,380–2,505 kg (5,247–5,523 lb)

Chronology
- Predecessor: Mercedes-Benz GL-Class (X164)
- Successor: Mercedes-Benz GLS-Class (X167)

The X166 Mercedes-Benz GL-Class is a full-size luxury crossover SUV produced from 2012 to 2019. It is the second generation model in the GL-Class range, and was renamed GLS as of the 2016 facelift.

== Development and launch ==
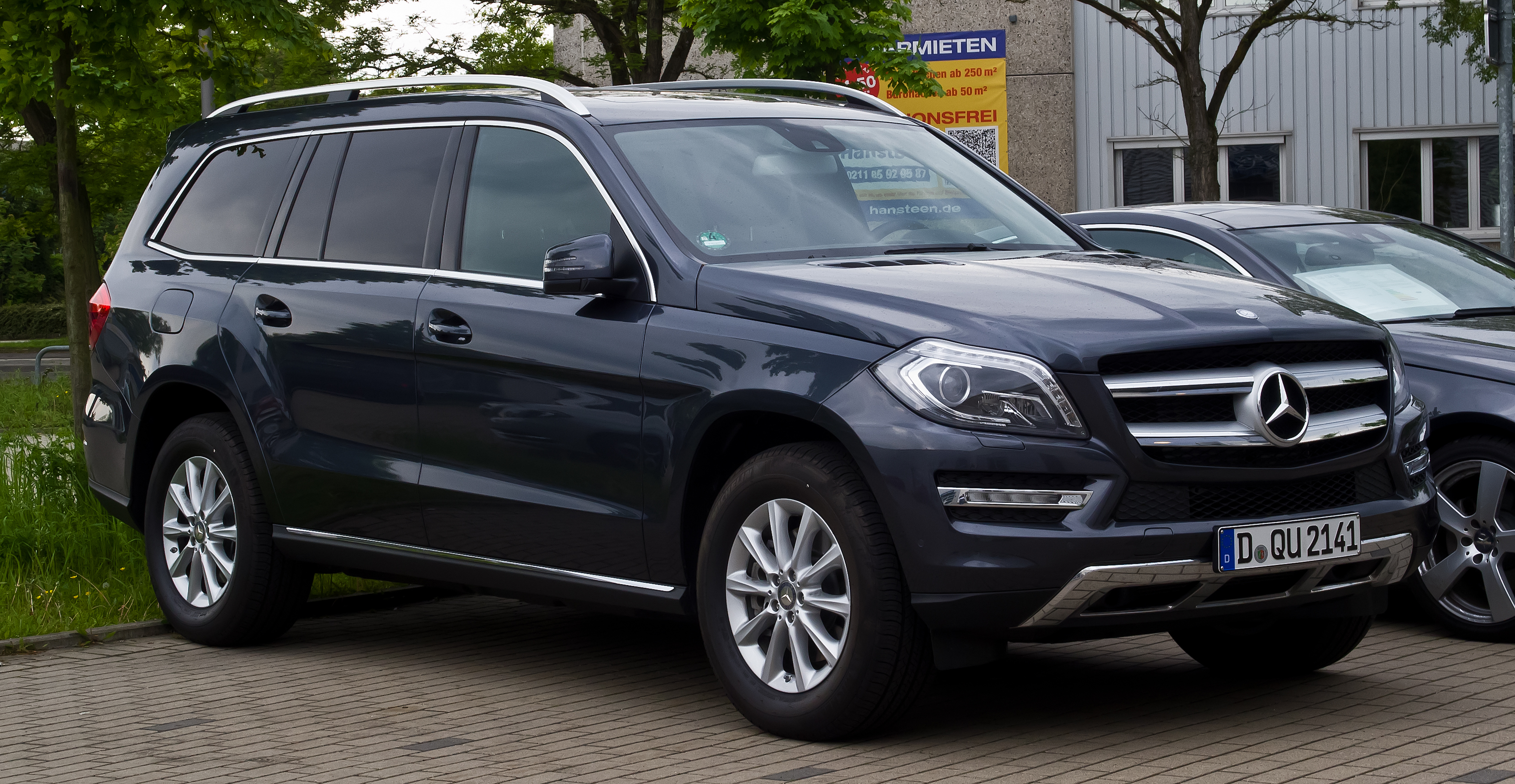

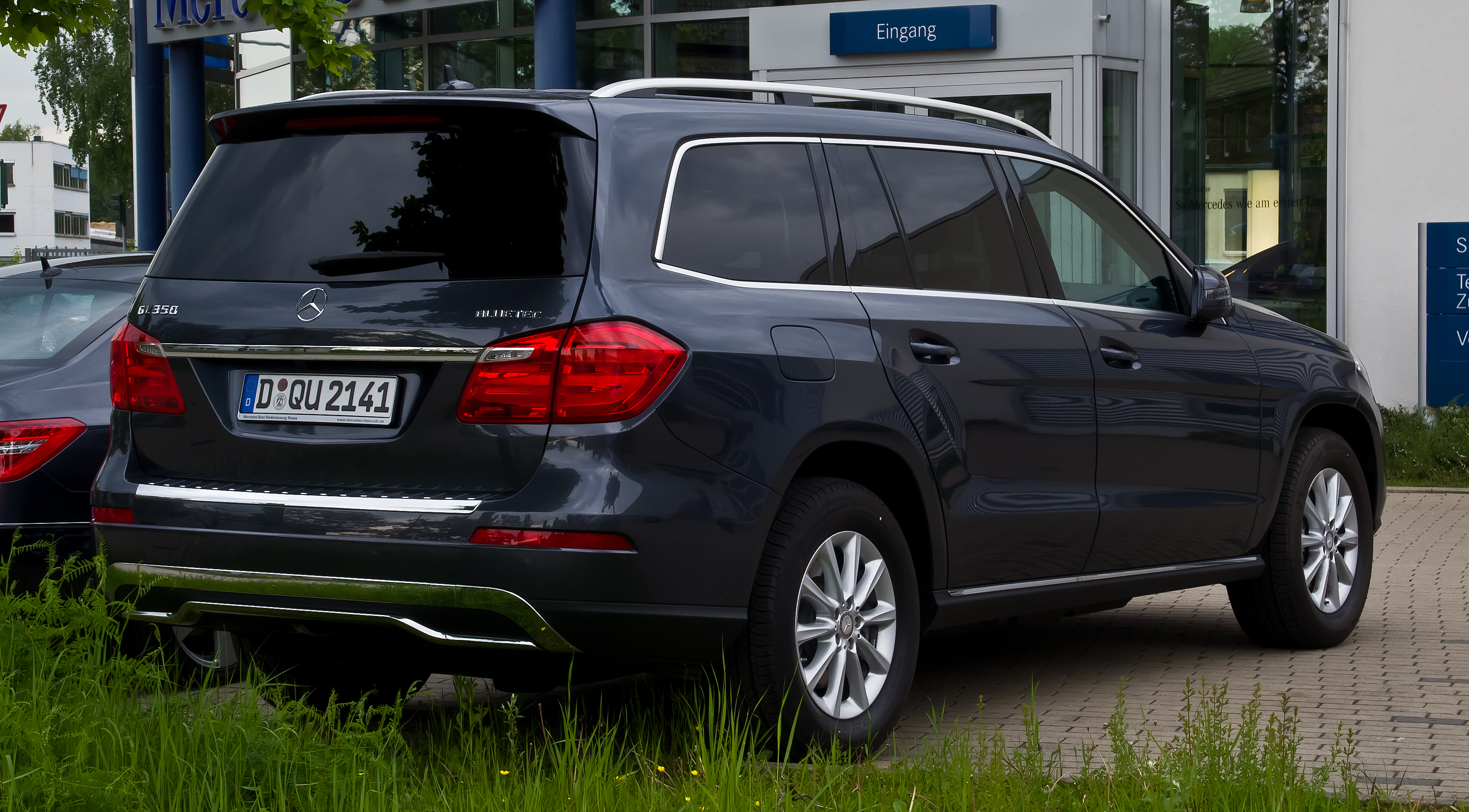
2013 GL 350 (pre-facelift, Germany)

The X166 GL-Class debuted at the 2012 New York International Auto Show and later went on sale in September 2012. Compared to its predecessor, the GL-Class is 10 mm (0.4 in) taller, 14 mm (0.6 in) wider, 21 mm (0.8 in) longer, and up to 100 kg (220 lb) lighter.

== Equipment ==
Standard equipment includes the COMAND system with a 5.8-inch display, LED headlights, and an adaptive air suspension for up to 285 mm (11.2 in) of ground clearance. Options include soft close doors, rear-seat infotainment displays, 20 and 21-inch wheel options, and an off-road package that adds an increased ride height, a skid plate, and a low-range gearbox. The GL-Class is also available with driver assistance systems such as active cruise control, lane-departure warning, and blind-spot monitoring systems.

== Models ==
=== Petrol engines ===
Model	Years	Engine	Power	Torque	0–100 km/h (0–62 mph)
GL400/GLS400 4MATIC	2014–2019	M276 DE30 LA; 3.0 L V6 turbo	245 kW (329 hp) @ 5,250–6,000 rpm	480 N⋅m (354 lb⋅ft); 1,600–4,000 rpm	
GL450 4MATIC	2013–2014	M278 DE46; 4.7 L V8 twin-turbo	270 kW (362 hp) @ 5,000–6,000 rpm	550 N⋅m (406 lb⋅ft) @ 1,500–4,000 rpm	6.6 s
GLS450 4MATIC	2015–2019	M276 E30; 3.0 L V6 twin-turbo	270 kW (362 hp) @ 5,500–6,000 rpm	500 N⋅m (369 lb⋅ft) @ 1,800–4,500 rpm	6.9 s
GL550 4MATIC	2012–2015	M278 DE46; 4.7 L V8 twin-turbo	320 kW (429 hp) @ 5,250 rpm	700 N⋅m (516 lb⋅ft) @ 1,800–3,500 rpm	5.2 s
GLS500/GLS550 4MATIC	2015–2019	M278 DE46; 4.7 L V8 twin-turbo	335 kW (449 hp) @ 5,250–5,500 rpm	700 N⋅m (516 lb⋅ft) @ 1,800–4,000 rpm	5.3 s
GL63 AMG	2013–2015	M157 DE55; 5.5 L V8 twin-turbo	410 kW (550 hp) @ 5,500 rpm	760 N⋅m (561 lb⋅ft) @ 2,000–4,500 rpm	4.9 s
GLS63 AMG	2015–2019	M157 DE55; 5.5 L V8 twin-turbo	430 kW (577 hp) @ 5,500 rpm	760 N⋅m (561 lb⋅ft) @ 1,750–5,250 rpm	4.6 s

=== Diesel engines ===
Model	Years	Engine	Power	Torque	0–100 km/h (0–62 mph)
GL350; BlueTEC	2012–2015	OM642 LS DE30; 3.0 L V6 turbo	190 kW (255 hp) @ 3,600 rpm	620 N⋅m (457 lb⋅ft) @ 1,600–2,400 rpm	7.9 s
GLS 350d 4MATIC	2015–2019	OM642 LS DE30; 3.0 L V6 turbo	190 kW (255 hp) @ 3,600 rpm	620 N⋅m (457 lb⋅ft) @ 1,600–2,400 rpm	7.8 s

== GL 63 AMG version ==
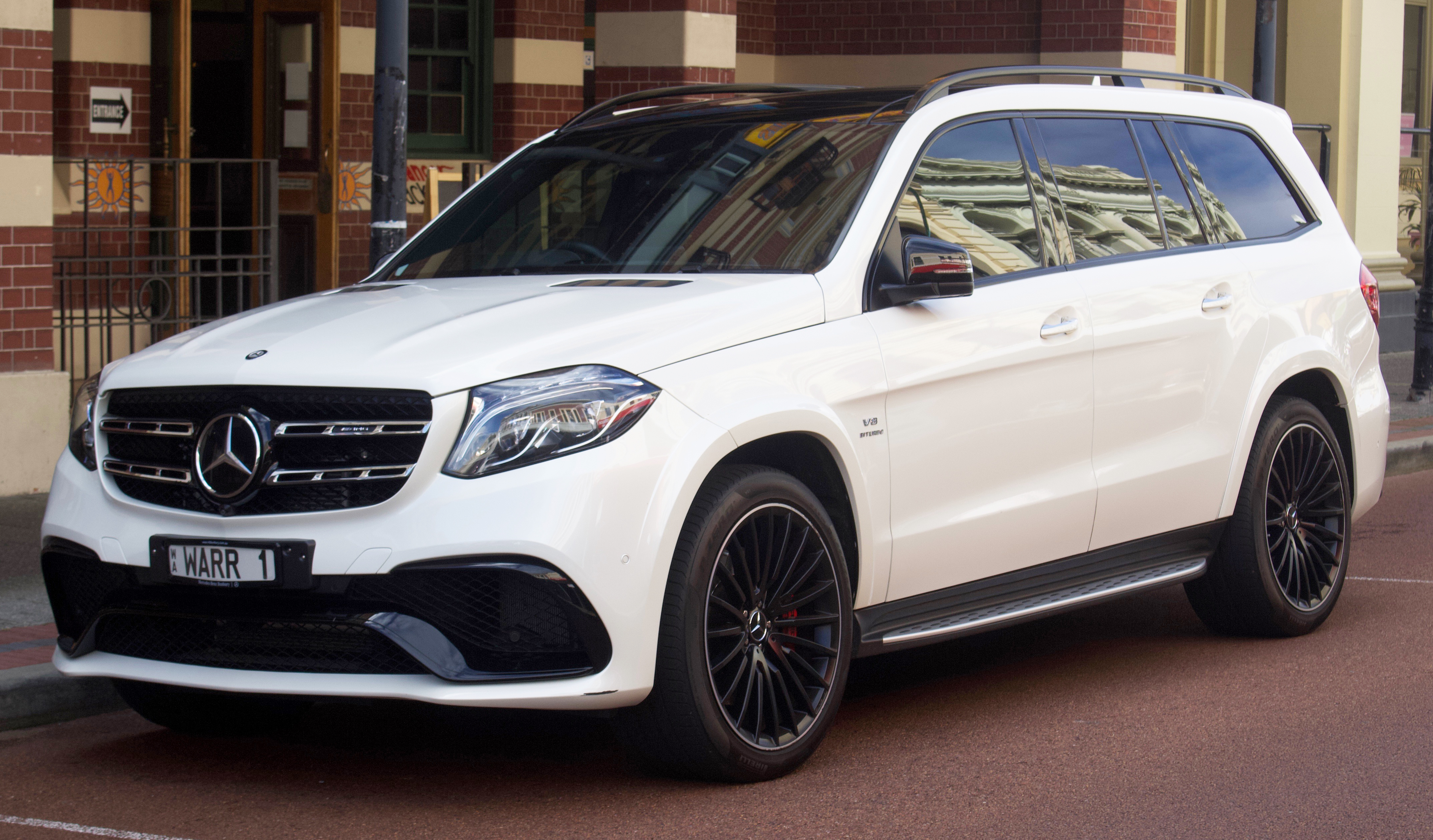
2017 GLS 63 AMG (facelift)

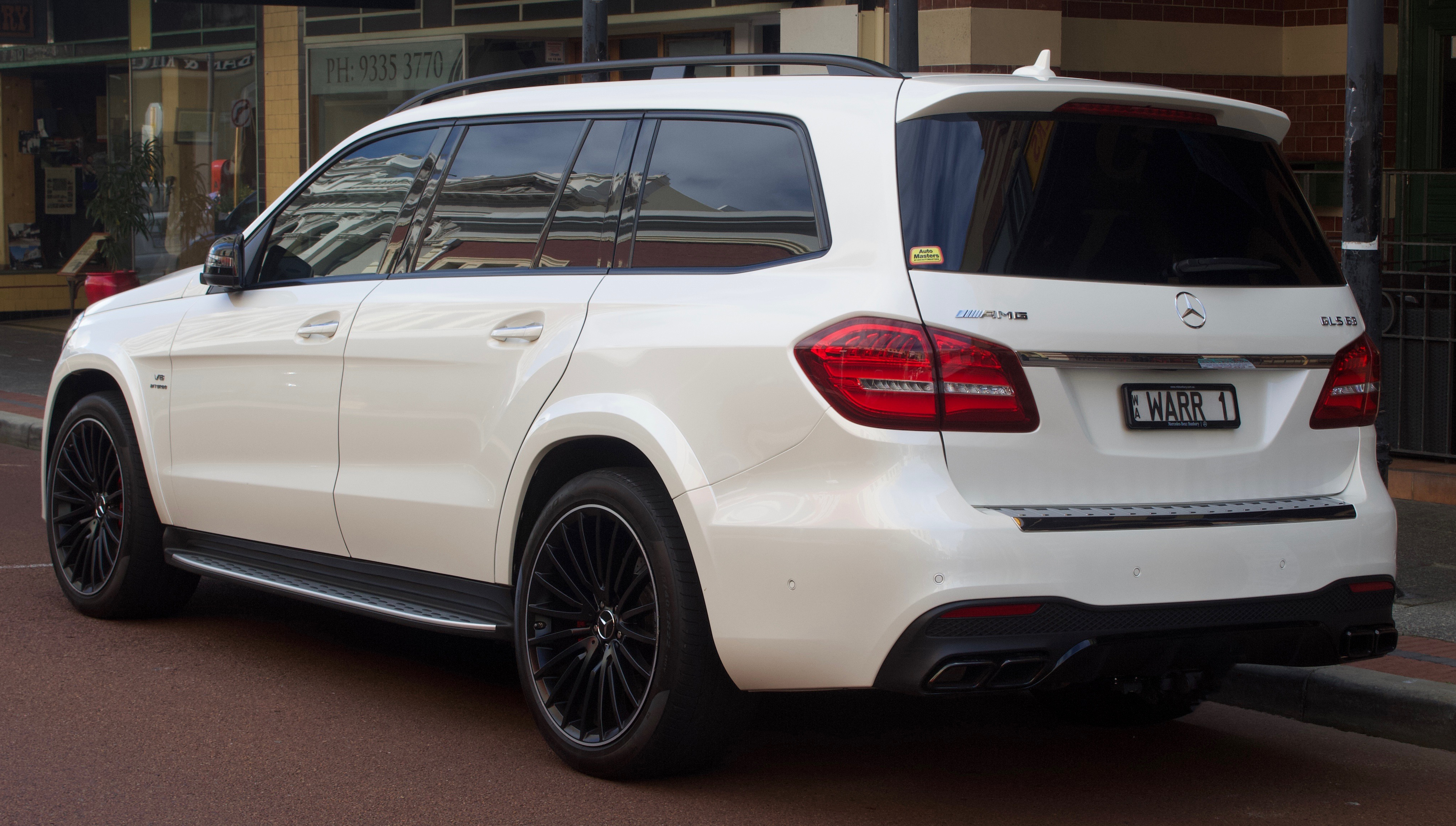
2017 GLS 63 AMG (facelift) rear

The GL63 AMG was introduced at the 2012 Los Angeles Auto Show. It features a hand-built twin-turbocharged 5.5 L V8 that produces 410 kW (550 hp) and 760 N⋅m (561 lb⋅ft). It is mated to a 7-speed AMG SPEEDSHIFT PLUS semi-automatic transmission, with Efficiency, Sport, and Manual modes. Additional features include upgraded brakes, a sports exhaust, AMG exterior and interior styling, 21-inch 5-spoke alloy wheels, and an air suspension system that automatically lowers the car at higher speeds. The engine was updated in 2016 and now produces 430 kW (577 hp) and 760 N⋅m (561 lb⋅ft).

== 2016 facelift ==
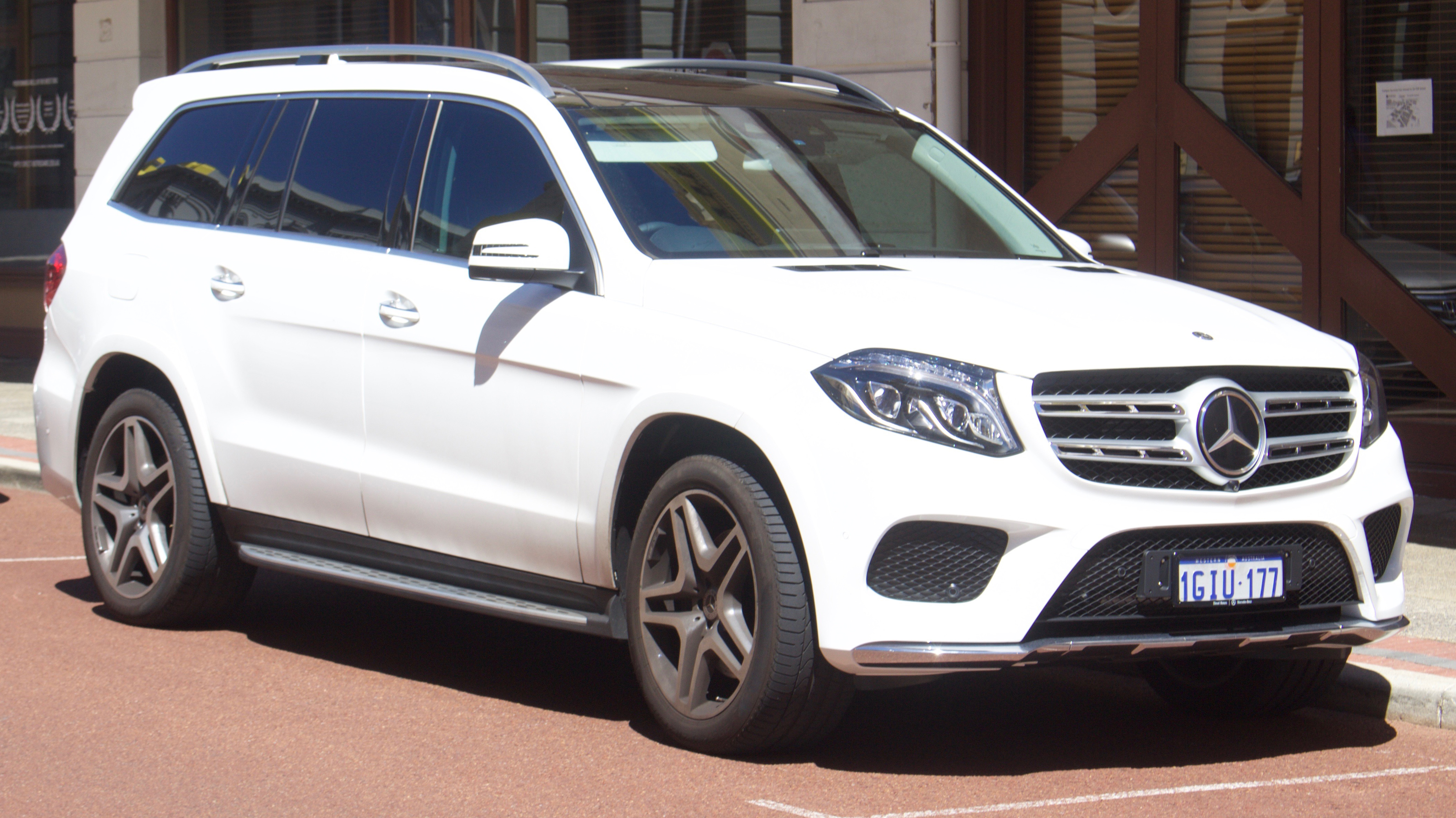

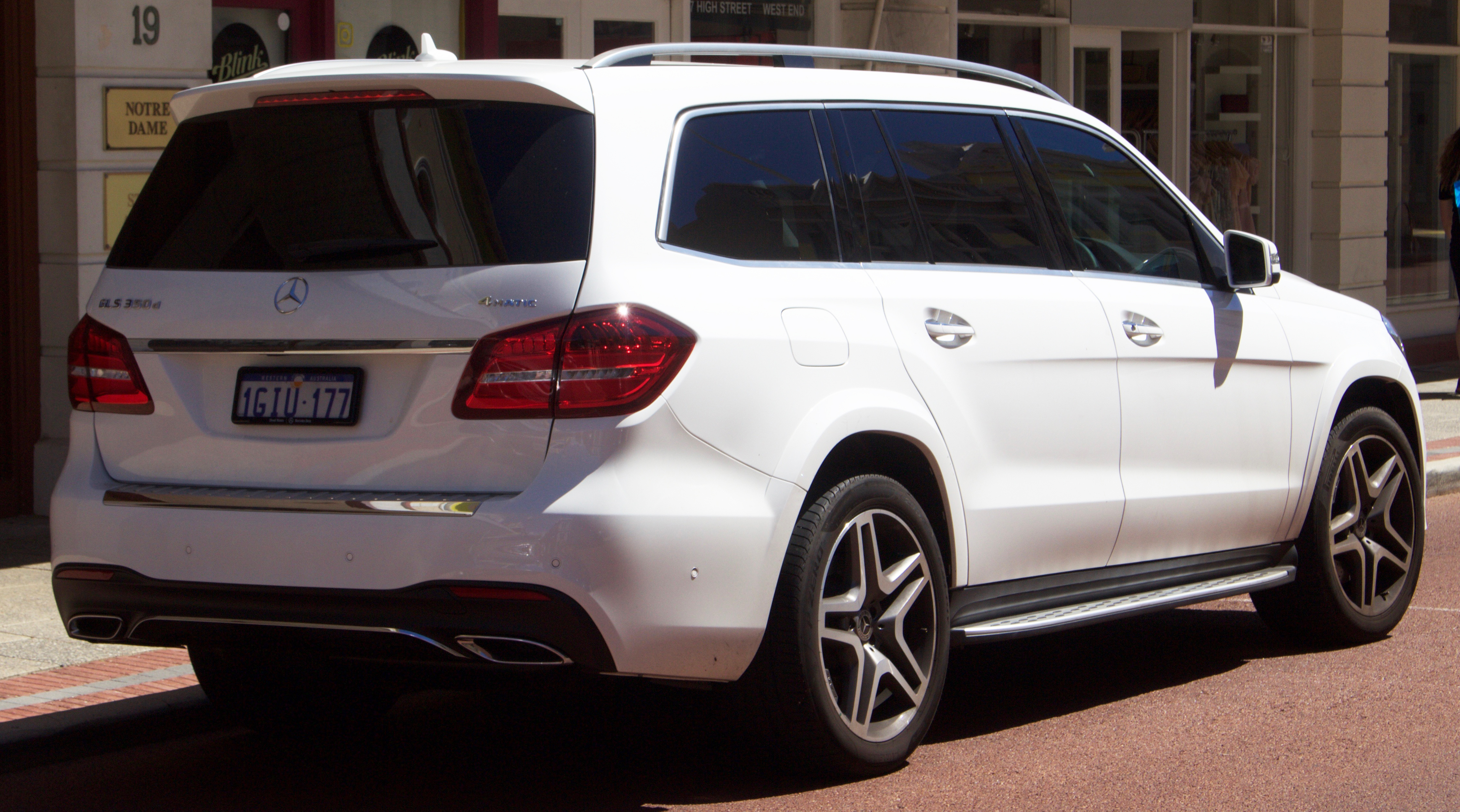
2017 GLS 350d (facelift, Australia)

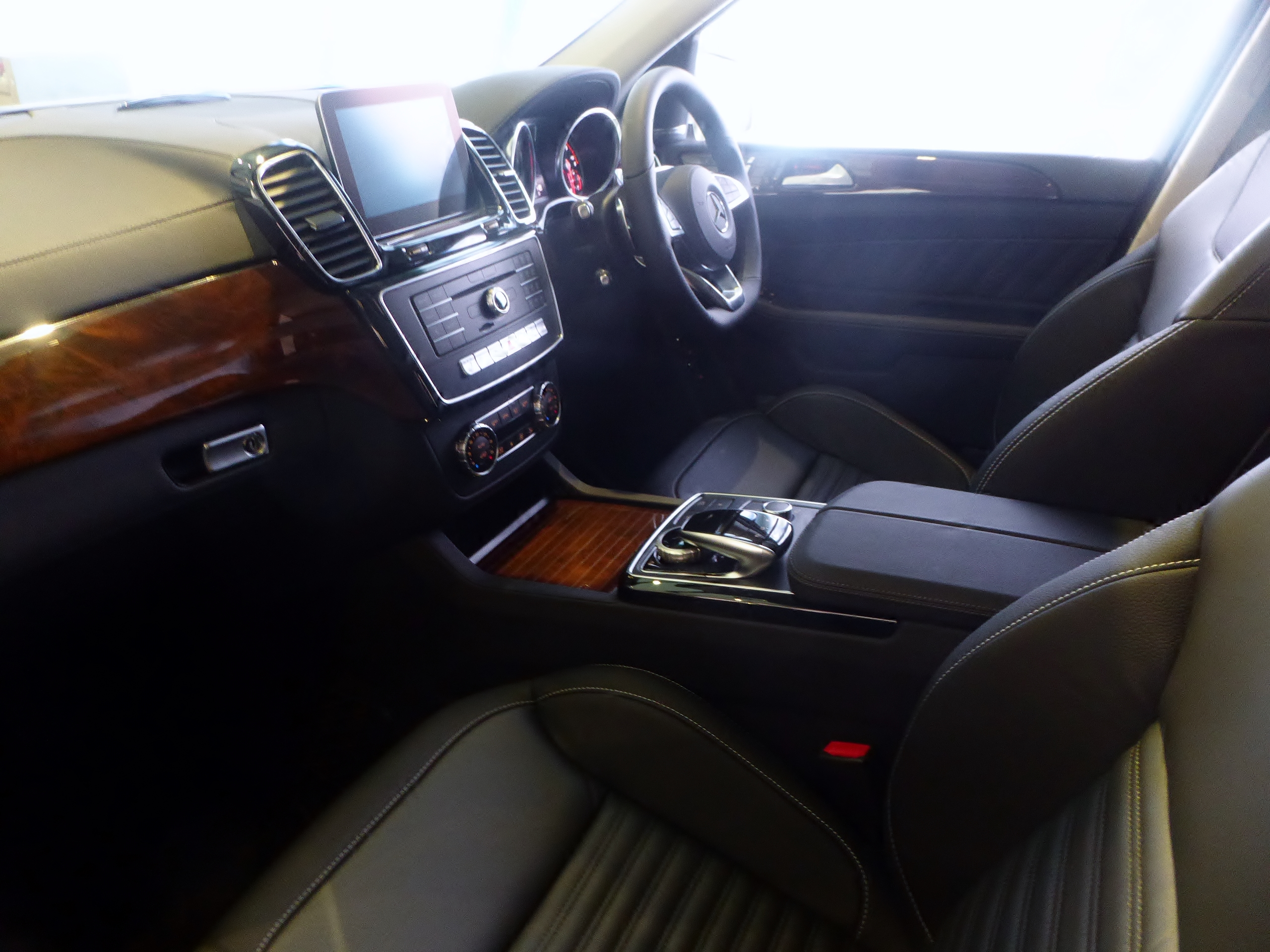
GLS 350d interior (facelift)

The facelift was unveiled in November 2015 with production beginning from January 2016. The GL-Class model range was renamed to GLS to correspond with the new Mercedes naming scheme. The exterior now featured full LED tail-lights and a revised front fascia with updated LED headlights, grille, and bumpers. The Guardian described it as "a laughably outsized car" and went on to say "it's amazing, but sooner or later, we'll all end up paying for this sort of unfettered excess. The car is epic in dimension and ability, but it's stunted in terms of its awareness of its place in our world." New exterior paint colours and alloy-wheel designs were also introduced.

Interior changes include a revised instrument panel and new 3-spoke multifunction steering wheel, as well as an upgraded free-standing 8-inch COMAND system display with Apple CarPlay and Android Auto support. GL500 and GL63 AMG models received performance improvements, and the 7-speed automatic was replaced by the 9-speed 9G-Tronic transmission.

== Sales figures ==
The following are the sales figures for the X166 GL-Class:

Note: 2012 sales figures include the previous generation model.

Year	EU sales	US sales
2012	1,573	26,042
2013	4,829	29,912
2014	4,187	26,597
2015	3,753	27,707
2016	5,361	30,442
2017	4,537	32,248
2018	3,534	21,973
Total:	27,774	194,921

== Awards ==
- 2013 MotorTrend "SUV of the Year"
- 2017 Car and Driver "10Best Award" in the large SUV category
