= Mercedes-Benz OM642 engine =

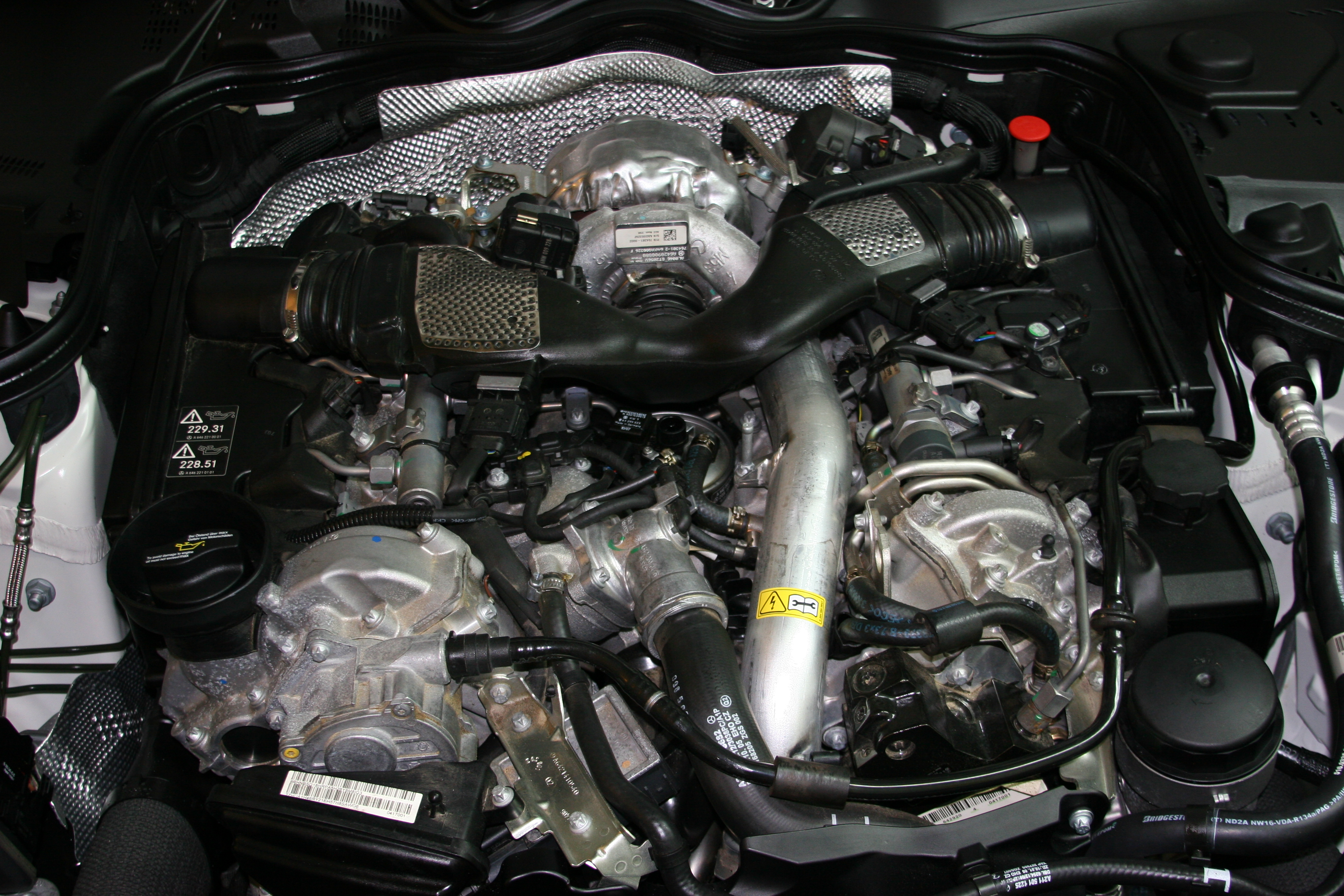

Overview
- Manufacturer: Daimler AG
- Production: 2005–2021

Layout
- Configuration: 72° V6
- Displacement: 3.0 L; 182.3 cu in (2,987 cc)
- Cylinder bore: 83 mm (3.27 in)
- Piston stroke: 92 mm (3.62 in)
- Cylinder block material: Aluminium
- Cylinder head material: Aluminium
- Valvetrain: DOHC 4 valves x cyl.
- Compression ratio: 18.0:1

Combustion
- Turbocharger: Variable nozzle Garrett GT2056VK, GTB2060VKLR, GTB2260VKLR
- Fuel system: Common rail direct injection
- Fuel type: Diesel
- Cooling system: Water cooled

Output
- Power output: European models: 195 kW (265 PS; 261 hp). US vehicles: 157 kW (213 PS; 211 hp). Mercedes/Dodge Sprinter, x280 CDI models: 140 kW (190 PS; 188 hp). Mercedes-Benz G-Class (W461) G280/G300 CDI: 135 kW (184 PS; 181 hp).
- Torque output: European models: 620 N⋅m (457 lb⋅ft). US vehicles: 540 N⋅m (398 lb⋅ft). Mercedes/Dodge Sprinter, x280 CDI models: 440 N⋅m (325 lb⋅ft). Mercedes-Benz G-Class (W461) G280/G300 CDI: 400 N⋅m (295 lb⋅ft).

Dimensions
- Dry weight: 208 kg (459 lb)

Chronology
- Predecessor: Mercedes-Benz OM648 engine
- Successor: Mercedes-Benz OM656 engine VM A630 (VM Motori)

The Mercedes-Benz OM642 engine is a 3.0 litres (2,987 cc), 24-valve, aluminium/aluminium block and heads diesel 72° V6 engine manufactured by the Mercedes-Benz division of Daimler AG as a replacement for the Mercedes straight-5 and straight-6 cylinder engines.

By 2010 a BlueTEC version of the Mercedes Sprinter OM642 was released. The BlueTEC systems allowed the elimination of much of the EGR in that vehicle's engine, which as a result gave 188 horsepower (140 kilowatts) compared to the non-BlueTec engine's 154 horsepower (115 kilowatts).

The engine features common rail Direct injection and a variable nozzle turbocharger. The injection system operates at 1,600 bar (23,000 psi), while the compression ratio is 18.0:1. The engine features a counter-rotating balance shaft mounted between the cylinder banks to cancel the vibrations inherent to the 72 degree V6 design, and the crankpins are offset by 48 degrees to achieve even 120 degree firing intervals. In some heavy vehicle applications, Mercedes' BlueTec AdBlue urea injection is utilised for NOx reduction. In lighter vehicle applications, a NOx storage catalyst captures nitrous oxides, which are periodically purged (decomposed) by running the engine slightly rich. A particulate filter lowers soot, making this engine ULEV certified. Engine mass is 208 kg (459 lb). Power output is 165 kW (224 PS; 221 hp) and 510 N⋅m (376 lb⋅ft) of torque. For the 2007 model year, torque is raised to 540 N⋅m (398 lb⋅ft).

At the beginning of summer 2017 the engine, together with Mercedes-Benz OM651 was under investigation by the Federal Motor Transport Authority in respect of the alleged emissions cheating scandal wherein the laboratory emissions testing produced a different amount of diesel exhaust fluid usage and lower emissions than in real world operating scenarios.

== Implementation ==
Vehicles using this engine include:

- Dodge / Freightliner Trucks / Mercedes-Benz Sprinter (2006–2022)
- Jeep Grand Cherokee WK/WH (2005–2010 (Europe)^{1}, 2007–2008 (North America)^{2})
- Jeep Commander XK/XH (2006–2010 (Europe))
- Mercedes-Benz C320 CDI (2005–2007)
- Mercedes-Benz E280/E300/E320 CDI/BlueTEC (2006–2009)
- Mercedes-Benz C320/C350 CDI (2009–2014)
- Mercedes-Benz CLK320 CDI (2005–2010)
- Mercedes-Benz E350 CDI/BlueTEC (2010–2016)
- Mercedes-Benz E 350d (2016–2018)
- Mercedes-Benz GLK 350 CDI (2013–2015)
- Mercedes-Benz R280/R300/R320/R350 CDI/BlueTEC (2007–2012)
- Mercedes-Benz ML280/ML300/ML320/ML350 CDI/BlueTEC (2007–2011)
- Mercedes-Benz ML350 BlueTEC/GLE 350d (2011–2018)
- Mercedes-Benz G280 CDI Worker/G280 CDI Edition 30 PUR/G280/G300 CDI Professional (2007–2013)
- Mercedes-Benz G320 CDI/G350 CDI/BlueTEC (2007–2018)
- Mercedes-Benz GL320/350 CDI/BlueTEC (2006–2012)
- Mercedes-Benz GL350 BlueTEC/GLS 350d (2012–2018)
- Mercedes-Benz GLC 350d (2016–2019)
- Mercedes-Benz S320/350 CDI/BlueTEC (2005–2013)
- Mercedes-Benz S350 BlueTEC/S 350d (2013–2017)
- Mercedes-Benz CLS320/350 CDI (2005–2011)
- Mercedes-Benz Vito 120/122 CDI/Viano 3.0 CDI (2006–2014)
- Chrysler 300C (2006–2011) (Europe, Australia and New Zealand only)
- Mercedes-Benz X350d (2017–2020)

^{1} EMEA market ^{2} NAFTA market

== Intake System ==
Air is drawn into the engine through two air filters located above each cylinder head. The amount of the air is measured by two hot film mass air flow sensors B2/6&7. On Sprinter models, a single air filter housing is mounted upon brackets on top of the engine.

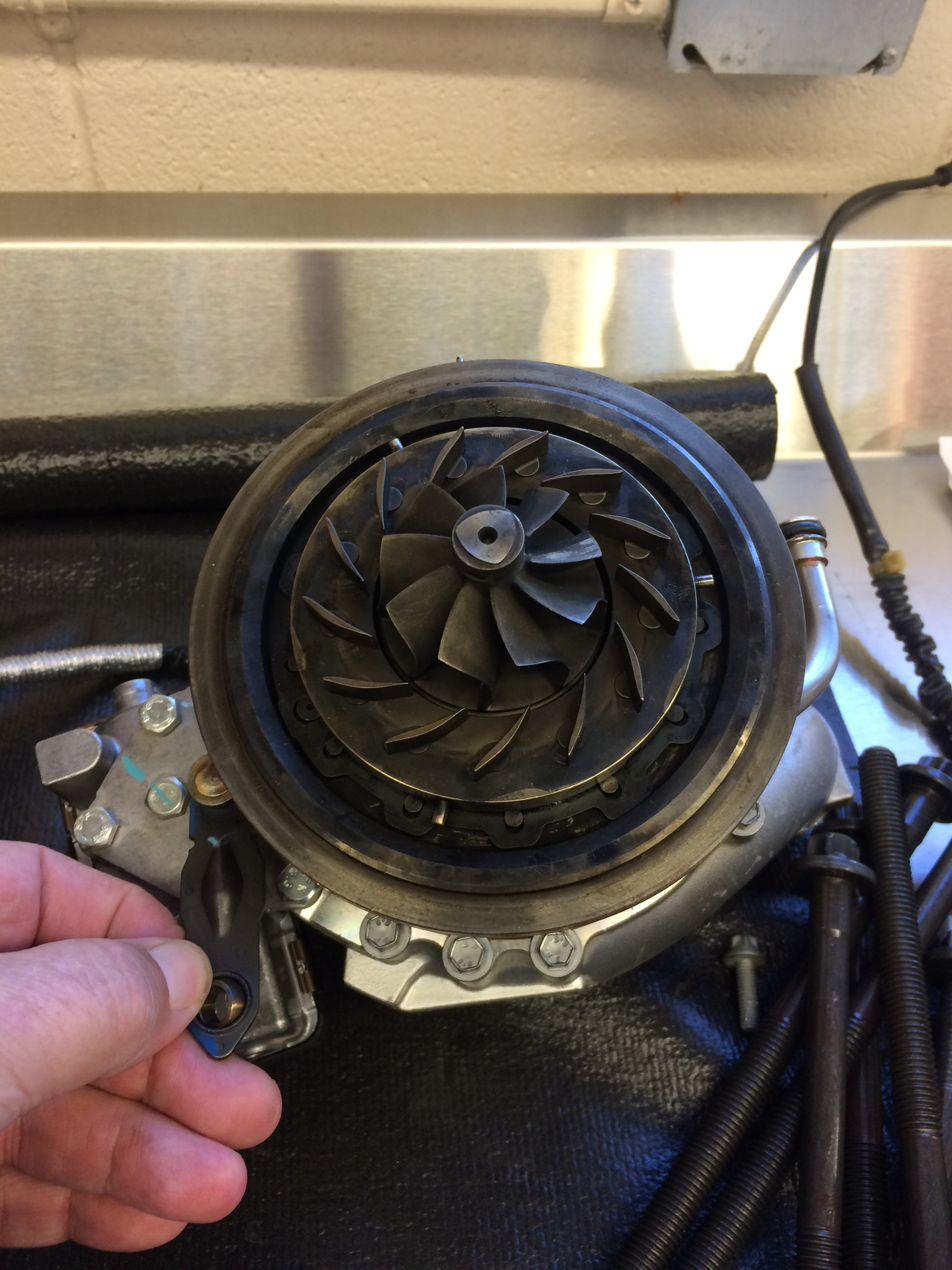
OM642 VGT low boost position

The variable geometry turbine is actuated via a linkage connecting the controller to vanes inside the turbine housing. With the VGT vanes in a closed position, the exhaust gases are accelerated into the turbine wheel blades increasing shaft speed thereby increasing boost. With the vanes in the open position the exhaust gases are decelerated causing a drop in the shaft speed and consequent drop in boost.

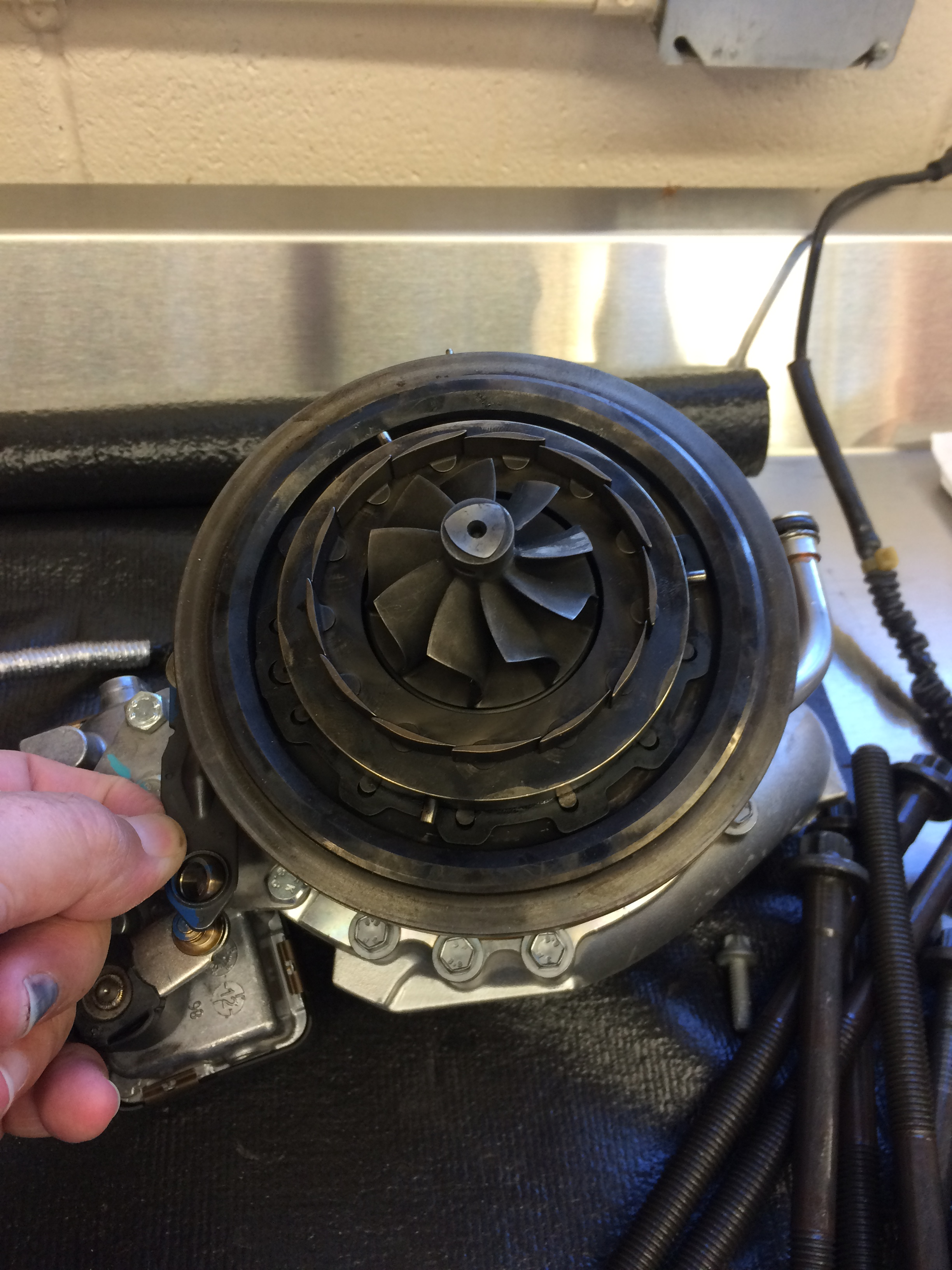
OM642 VGT in boost position

== See also ==
- List of Mercedes-Benz engines
- List of engines used in Chrysler products
