= Leapmotor D99 =

Full-size luxury minivan

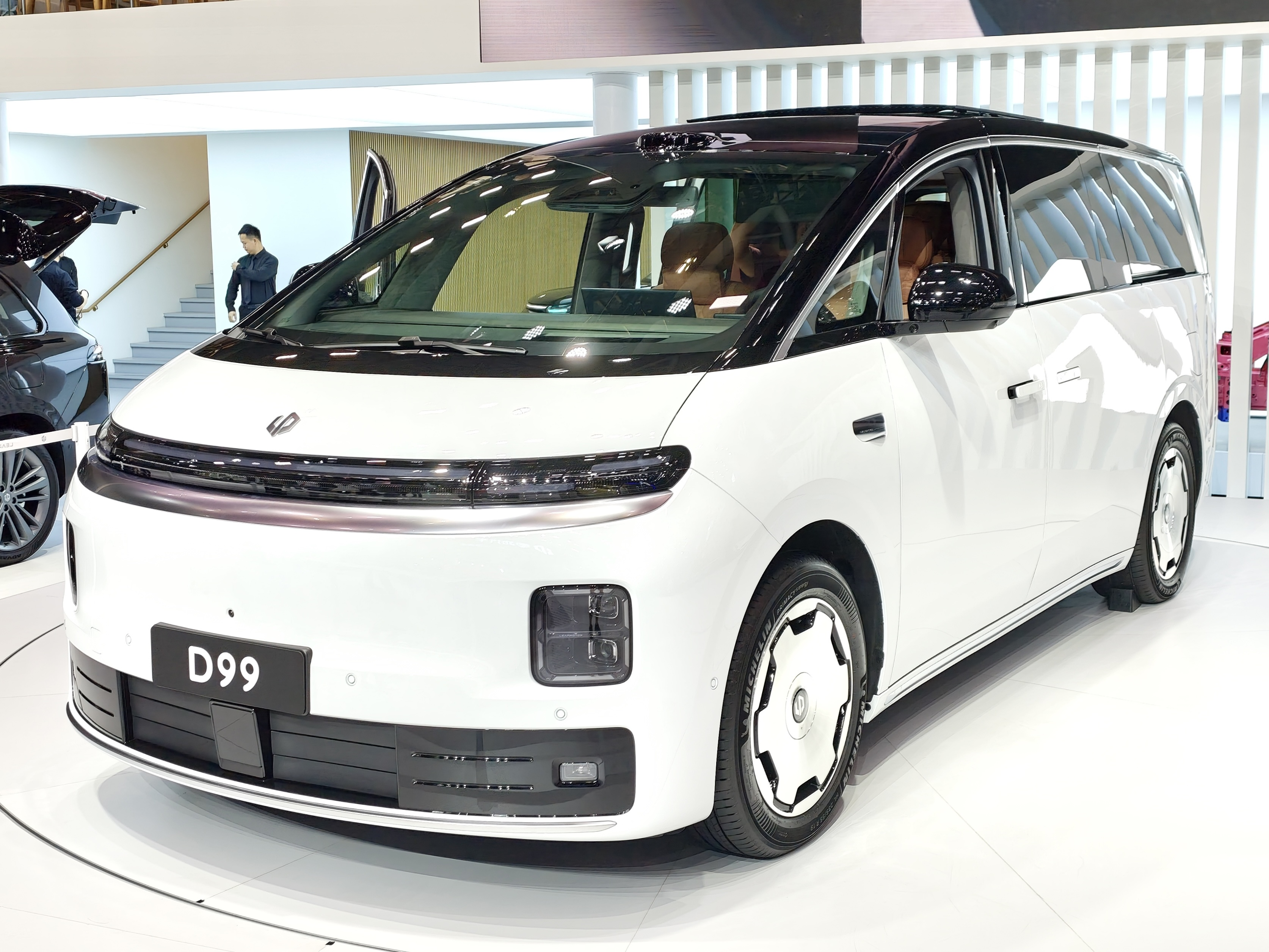

Overview
- Manufacturer: Leapmotor
- Production: 2026–present
- Assembly: China: Jinhua

Body and chassis
- Class: Luxury minivan
- Body style: 5-door minivan
- Layout: Battery electric: Dual-motor, all-wheel-drive; Range-extended EV: Front-engine, dual-motor, all-wheel-drive
- Platform: LEAP 4.0
- Related: Leapmotor D19

Powertrain
- Engine: Petrol range extender: 1.5 L turbocharged I4
- Hybrid drivetrain: Series (EREV)
- Battery: 115 kWh CATL Freevoy LFP/NMC (EV); 80.3 kWh CATL LFP (EREV)
- Electric range: 720 km (447 mi) (EV); 500 km (311 mi) (EREV)

Dimensions
- Wheelbase: 3,110 mm (122.4 in)
- Length: 5,280 mm (207.9 in)
- Width: 1,995 mm (78.5 in)
- Height: 1,880–1,900 mm (74.0–74.8 in)

The Leapmotor D99 (Chinese: 零跑D99; pinyin: Língpǎo D99) is a battery electric and range-extended luxury minivan produced by Leapmotor since 2026. It is Leapmotor's first-ever minivan.

The D99 is the second vehicle in its D-series range of models from Leapmotor, after the D19.

== Development ==
=== Spy shots ===
Spy shots of a D99 prototype alongside a D19 prototype undergoing testing were shared by the company's COO, Xu Jun, on August 7, 2025. The same post also stated that both the D19 and D99 would be positioned as the brand's flagships.

=== Reveal ===
The D99 is Leapmotor's second vehicle in its D-series range of models. It was revealed at the brand's 10th anniversary event, which was held in Hangzhou, on December 28, 2025. Leapmotor also confirmed at the event that the D99 would be the brand's flagship model, even as a luxury minivan. At the same time, during the event, the details of the D19's interior were also revealed.

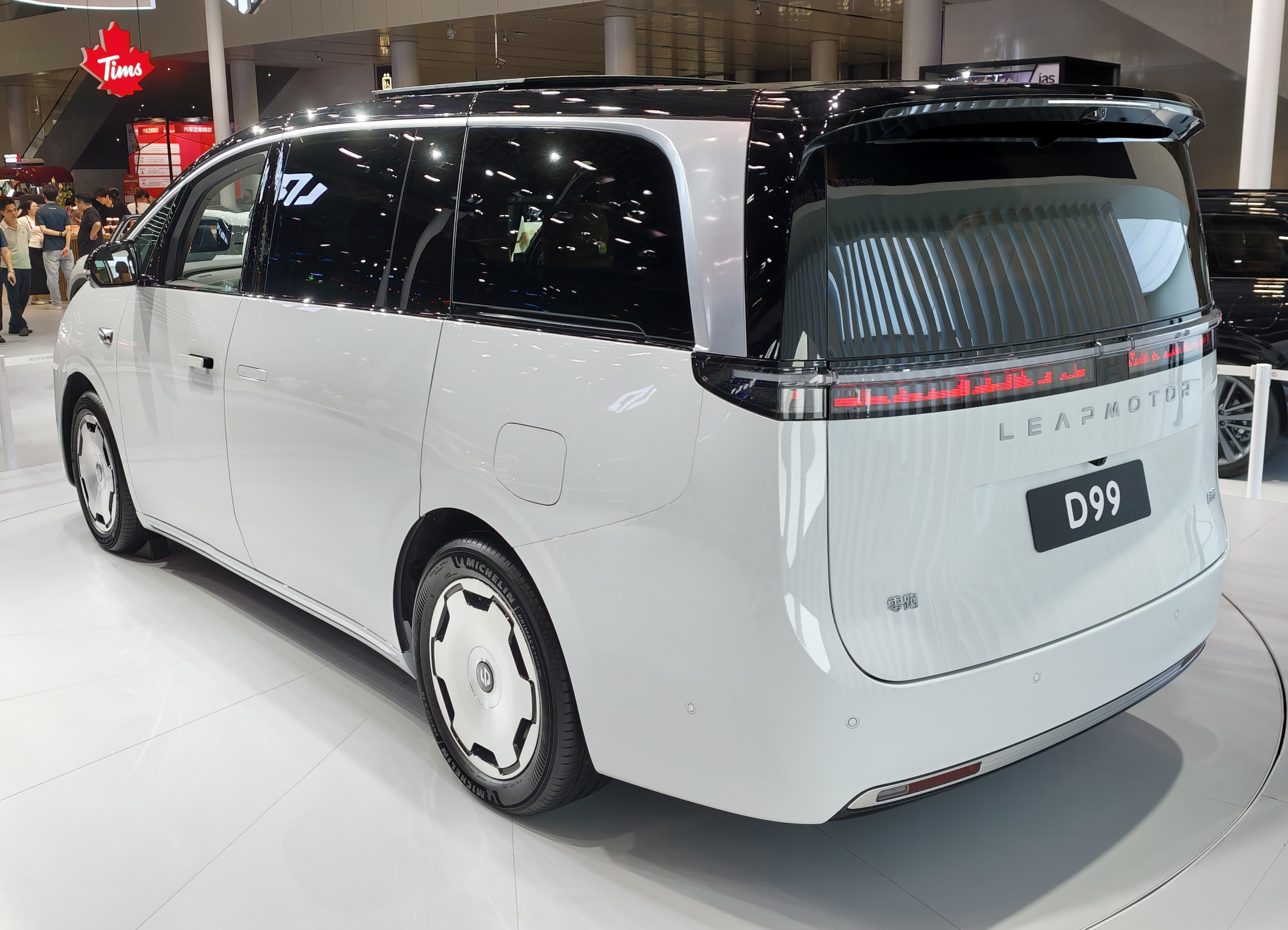
Rear view

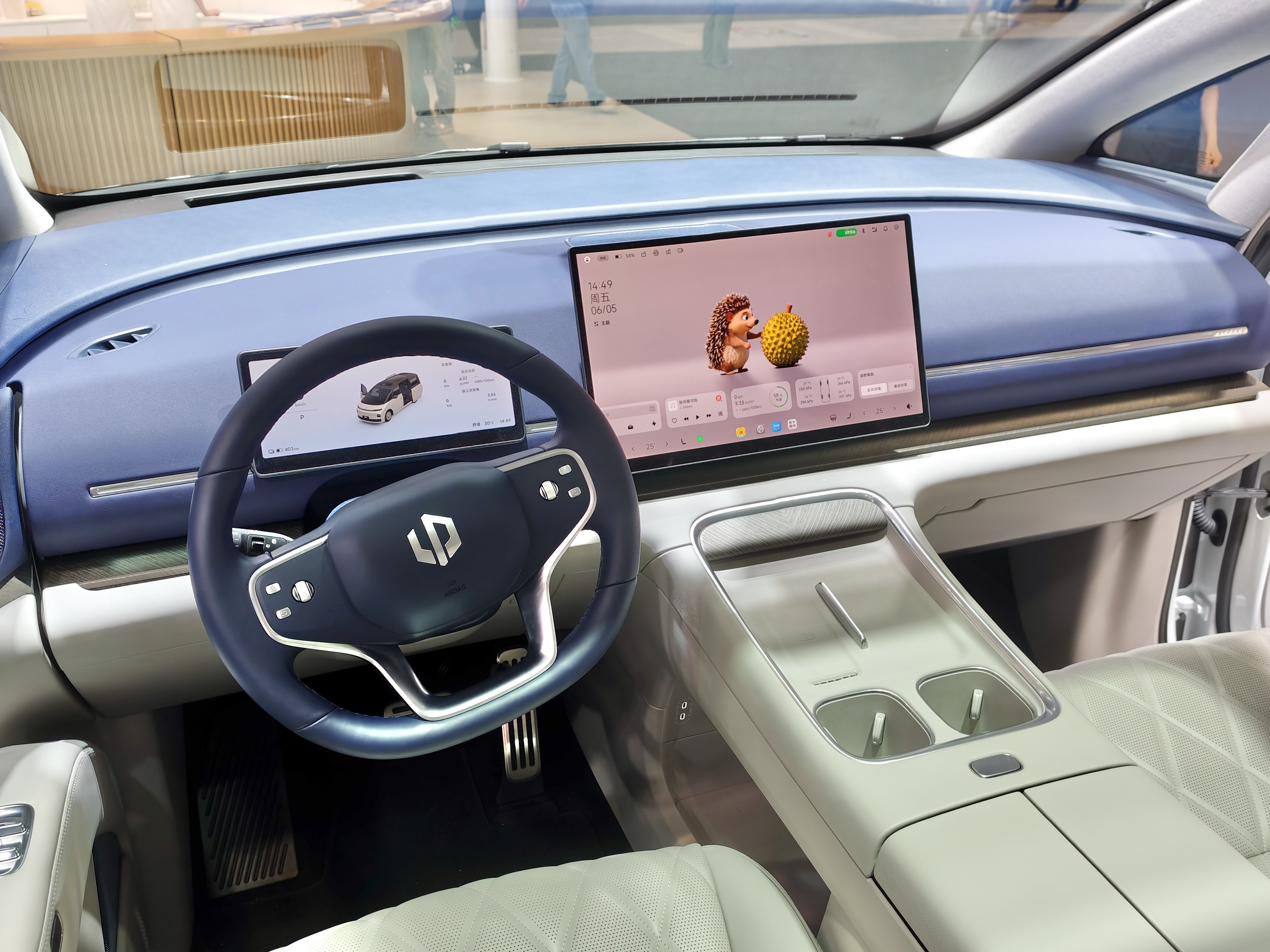
Interior

== Overview ==
=== Design ===
The D99’s front shares the D19's design language, featuring the three-segment daytime running lights and split headlamps. The front bumper uses active air intake grilles. The D99 has a dynamic, streamlined profile with an angled A-pillar incorporating triangular windows that integrate with the roof. The exterior features a two-tone design with a laser radar system mounted on the roof. It has a short overhang but a long rear overhang and uses concealed door rails for the rear sliding doors.

=== Features ===
The D99 uses two Qualcomm Snapdragon 8797 chips to power its smart driving system, with the two chips able to make a combined 1280 TOPS of computing power and can also support VLA large language models.

A full-width light bar is present at the back of the D99. It uses 8,260 LED units. The D99 also uses 19-inch wheels, dual-chamber air suspension, and variable damping shock absorbers.

== Powertrain ==
The power outputs of the D99 are yet to be revealed. What is known is that both versions will use CATL batteries, with the EV version using a 1000-volt architecture and a 115 kWh Freevoy LFP/NMC battery, and the EREV version will use an 800-volt architecture and an 80.3 kWh CATL LFP battery. Leapmotor claims the EREV version will have a range of around 500 km (311 mi), while the EV will get around 720 km (447 mi).

The overall powertrain options of the D99 are expected to mirror that of the D19.
