= Mercedes-Benz GLS (X167) =

Third generation of Mercedes-Benz GLS

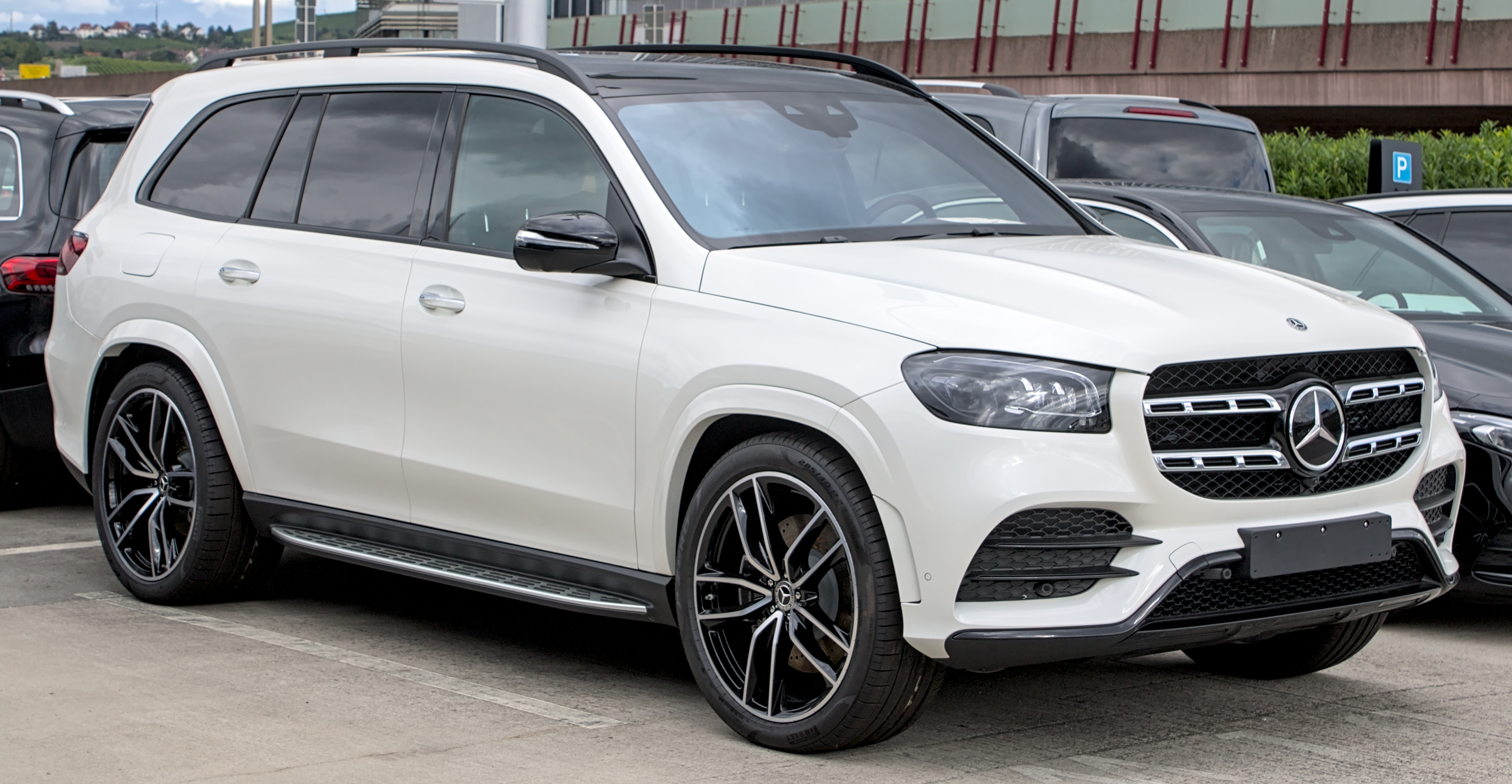

Overview
- Manufacturer: Daimler AG (2019–2022); Mercedes-Benz Group (2022–present)
- Model code: X167
- Production: October 2019 – present
- Model years: 2020–present
- Assembly: United States: Vance, Alabama (MBUSI) (GLS 450, 580, AMG 63 only); Egypt: 6th of October City (EGA); Indonesia: Bogor (MBI, CKD); Thailand: Samut Prakan (TAAP, CKD)
- Designer: Balázs Filczer

Body and chassis
- Class: Full-size luxury crossover SUV
- Body style: 5-door SUV
- Layout: Front-engine, four-wheel-drive (4matic)
- Related: Mercedes-Benz GLE (W167)

Powertrain
- Engine: Petrol mild hybrid: 3.0 L M256 turbo I6; 4.0 L M176 twin-turbo V8; 4.0 L M177 twin-turbo V8; Diesel mild hybrid: 2.9 L OM 656 D29 twin-turbo I6
- Transmission: 9-speed 9G-Tronic automatic

Dimensions
- Wheelbase: 3,135 mm (123.4 in)
- Length: 5,207 mm (205.0 in)
- Width: 1,956–2,030 mm (77.0–79.9 in)
- Height: 1,850 mm (72.8 in)
- Kerb weight: 2,410–2,415 kg (5,313–5,324 lb)

Chronology
- Predecessor: Mercedes-Benz GL-Class (X166)

The Mercedes-Benz GLS (X167) is the third generation of the Mercedes-Benz GLS full-sized luxury crossover SUV produced since October 2019. It replaces the Mercedes-Benz GL-Class/GLS (X166).

== Development and launch ==
The third generation X167 GLS debuted at the 2019 New York International Auto Show. It is launched in October 2019 in the United States and at the end of 2019 for Europe and rest of the world. The X167 is 7.7 cm longer and 2.2 cm wider than X166. The wheelbase is 6 cm longer, which increases interior space for the second row seats. Additionally, X167 GLS is first SUV from Mercedes-Benz to have fully electrically adjustable three rows of seats and to offer the optional six-seat configuration with captain seats for second row. The second and third row seats can be folded electrically flat with a touch of a button.

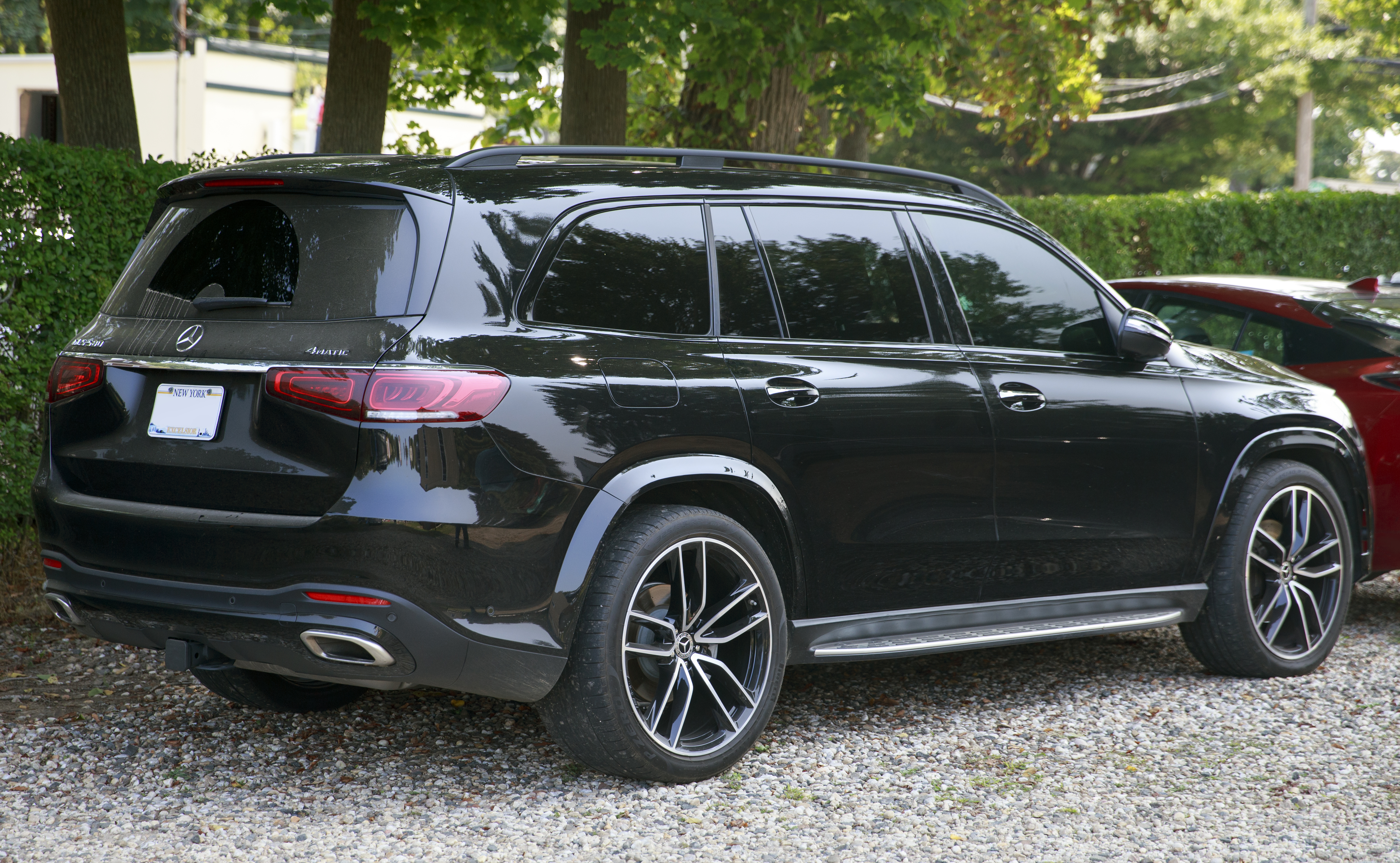
Rear view (pre-facelift)

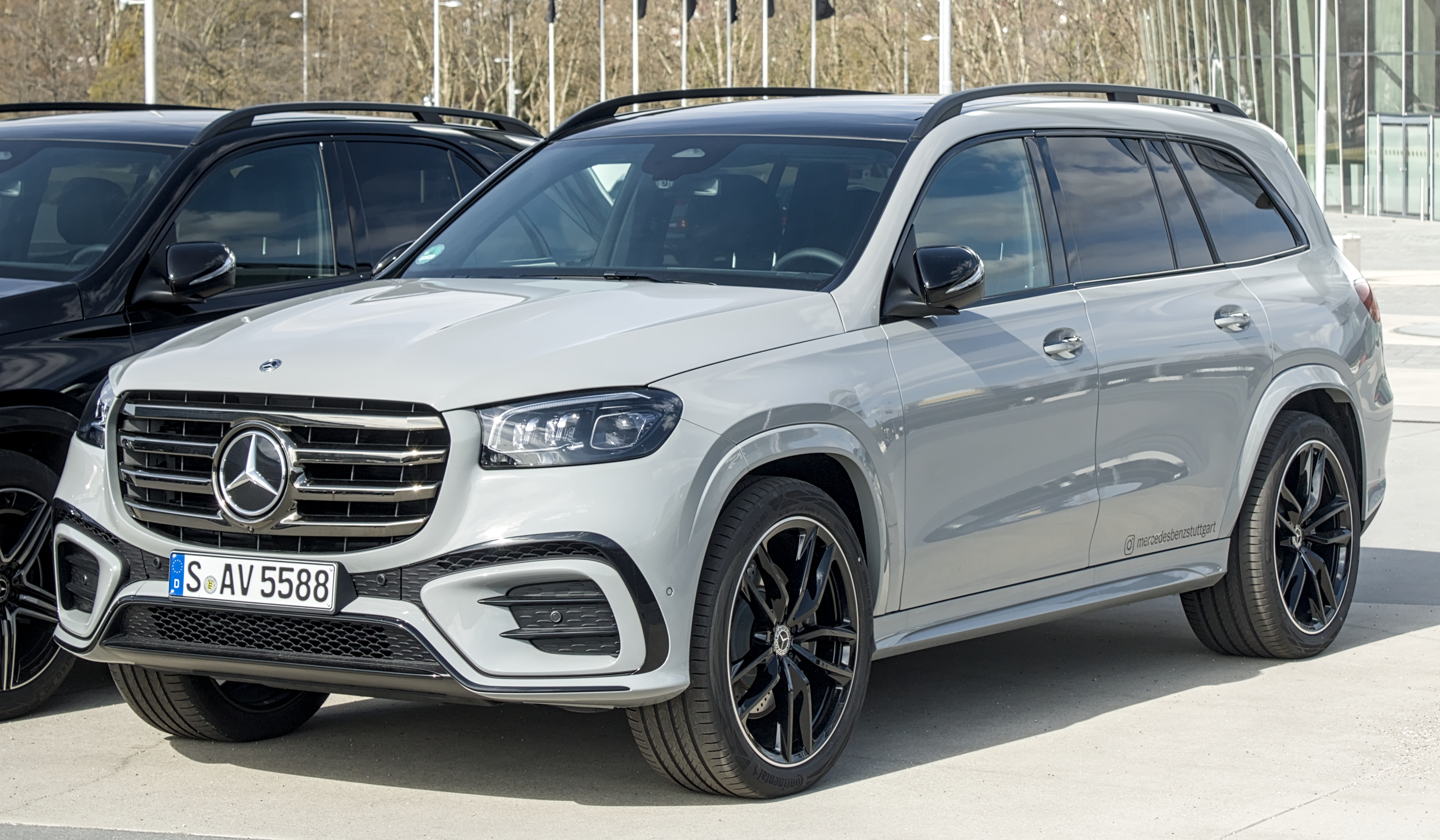
Mercedes-Benz GLS (2023 facelift)

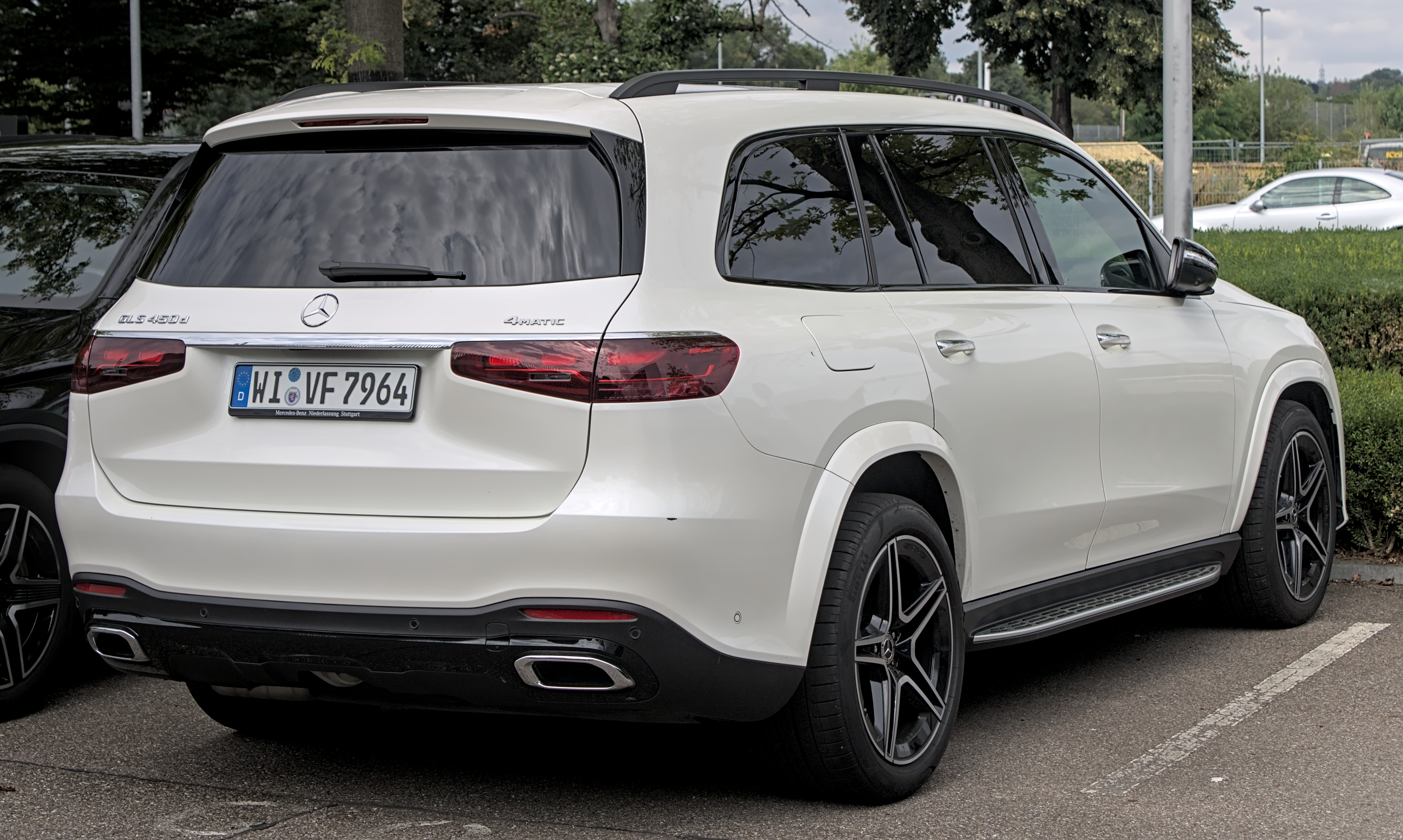
Rear view (2023 facelift)

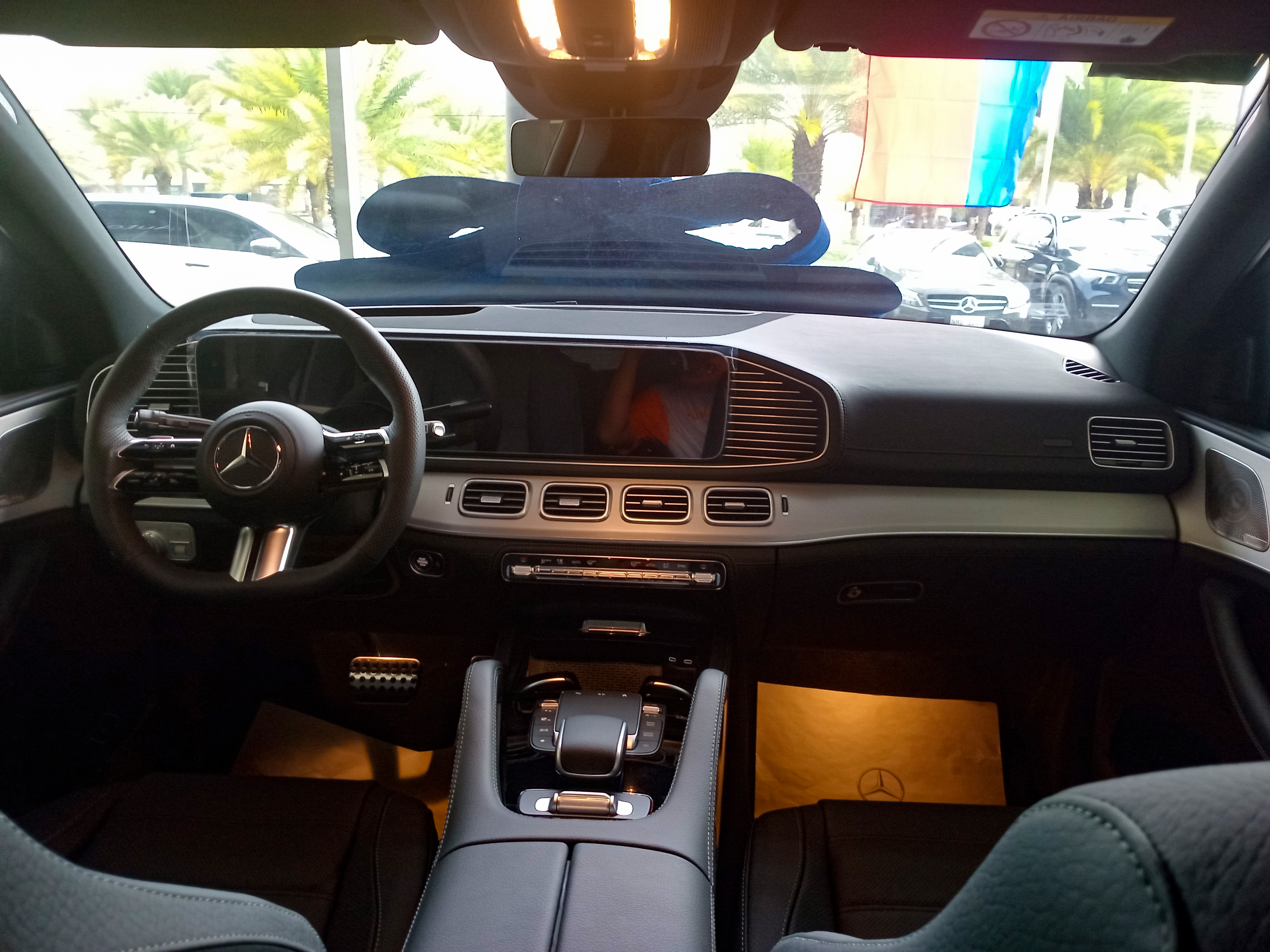
Interior (2023 facelift)

== Models ==
=== Mercedes-Maybach GLS 600 4Matic ===
A first Maybach version of the GLS, the GLS 600 4Matic, was unveiled at 2019 Guangzhou International Motor Show on 21 November 2019. The engine is a detuned version of the M177 V8 Biturbo found in the Mercedes-AMG GLS 63 4Matic+, but with a 48-Volt mild hybrid system. Although Mercedes-Benz has registered both GLS 600 4Matic and GLS 680 4Matic nomenclatures, the latter was designated exclusively to the Chinese market due to the auspicious nature of number 8, closely associated with luck and wealth, as the manufacturer also did with Mercedes-Maybach S 680 (known as the S 650 in other markets). The GLS 600 4Matic isn't based on the Mercedes-Maybach Vision Ultimate Luxury concept vehicle shown at 2018 Shanghai Motor Show. This version is the first time that a three-point star stand-up ornament affixed to the hood/bonnet on an SUV, rather than the large "jet-engine" three-point star filling up the grille space as found in every SUV from Mercedes-Benz since 1979.

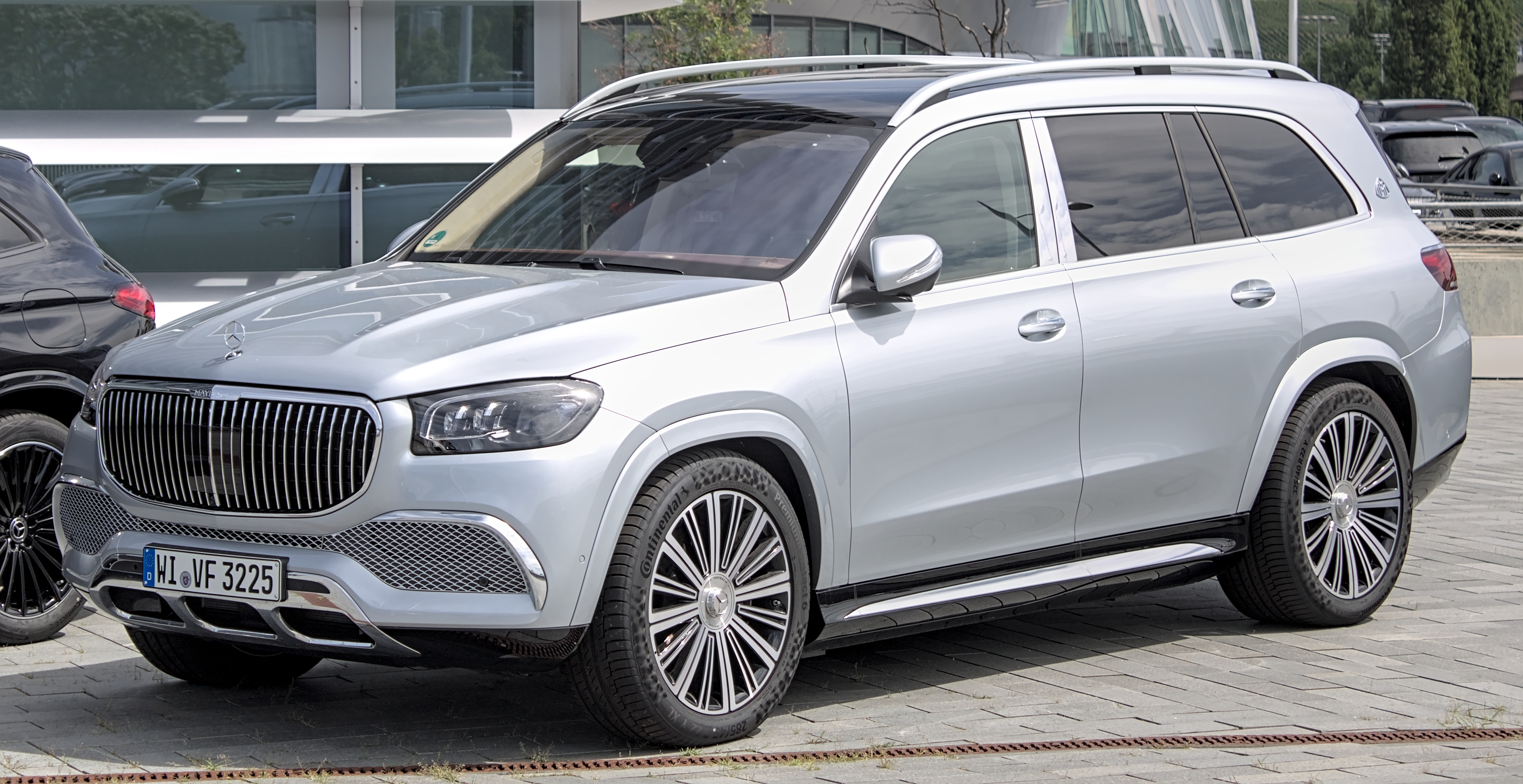
2023 Mercedes-Maybach GLS 600 (pre-facelift)

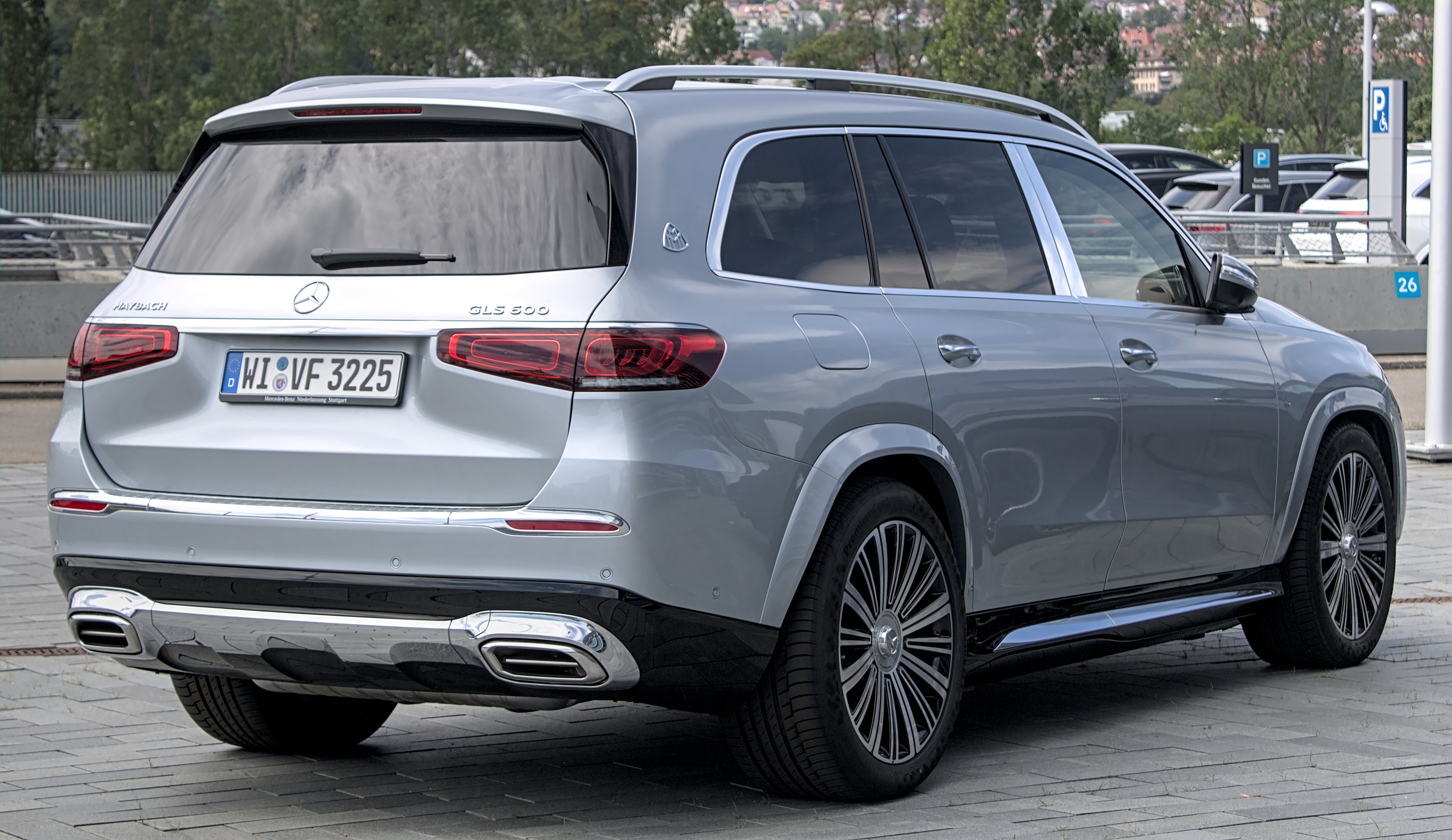
2023 Mercedes-Maybach GLS 600 (pre-facelift)

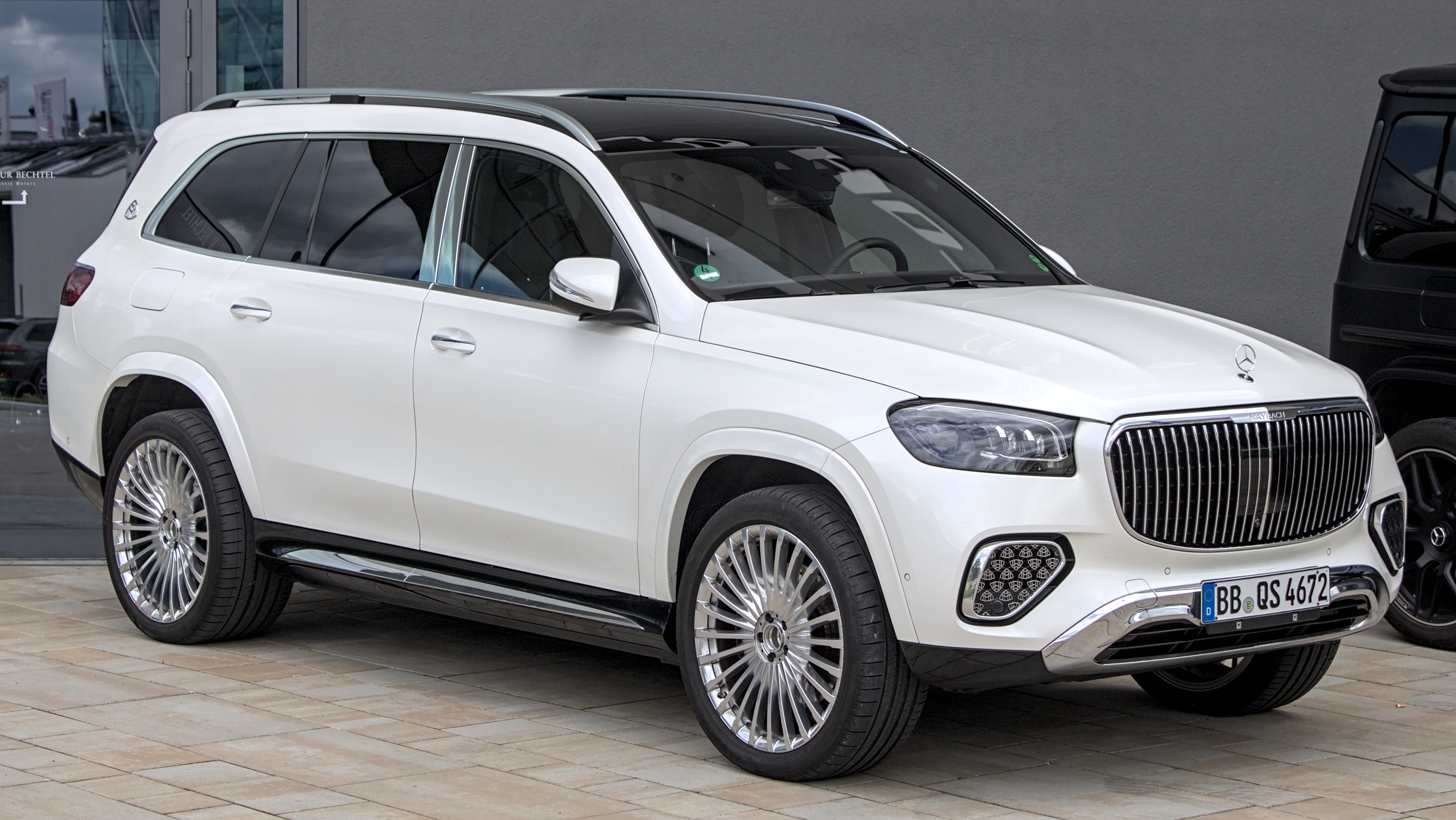
2024 Mercedes-Maybach GLS 600 (2023 facelift)

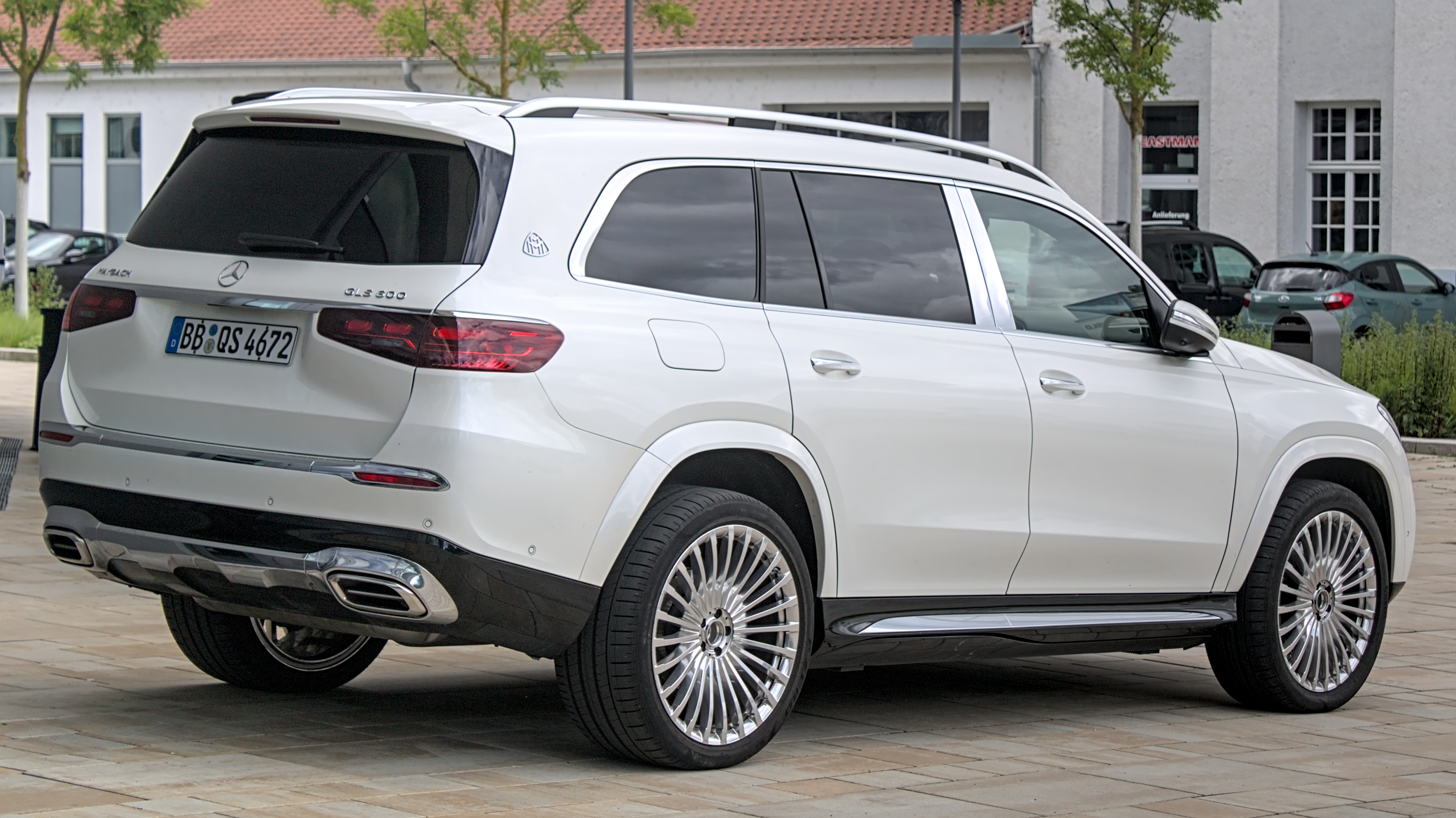
2024 Mercedes-Maybach GLS 600 (2023 facelift)

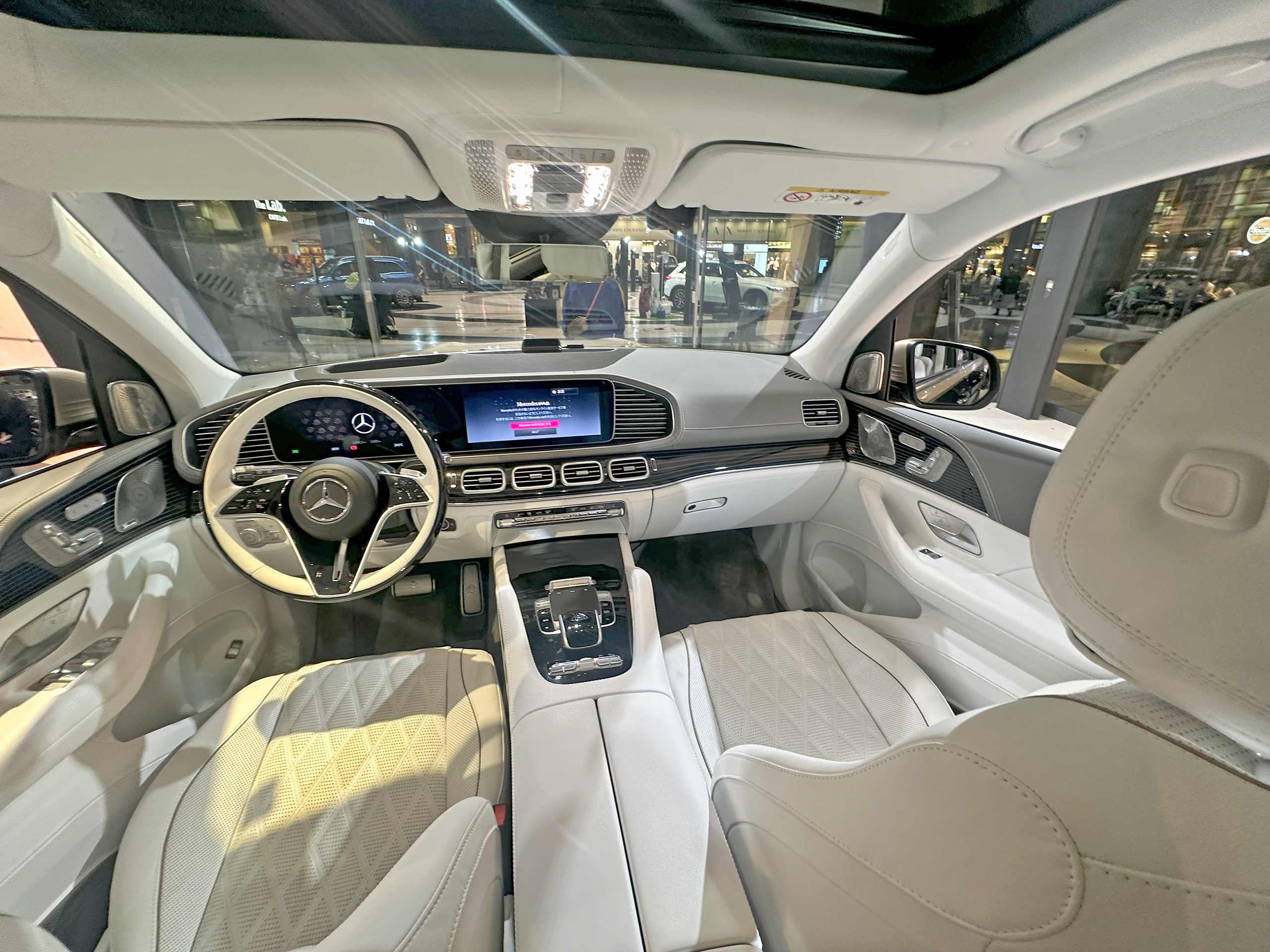
Interior (2023 facelift)

=== Mercedes-AMG GLS 63 4Matic+ ===
The second generation AMG version of the GLS-Class, GLS 63 4Matic+, was introduced at the same time as Mercedes-Maybach GLS 600 4Matic. The 4.0-litre M177 V8 Biturbo is rated at 455 kW (619 PS; 610 bhp), making the GLS 63 4Matic+ the most powerful GLS ever. One of the available 23 inch wheel designs is inspired by classic AMG monoblock alloy wheels.

Due to its large size and negative environmental impact, Environmental Action Germany gave the car their Goldener Geier (Golden Vulture) award in 2020.

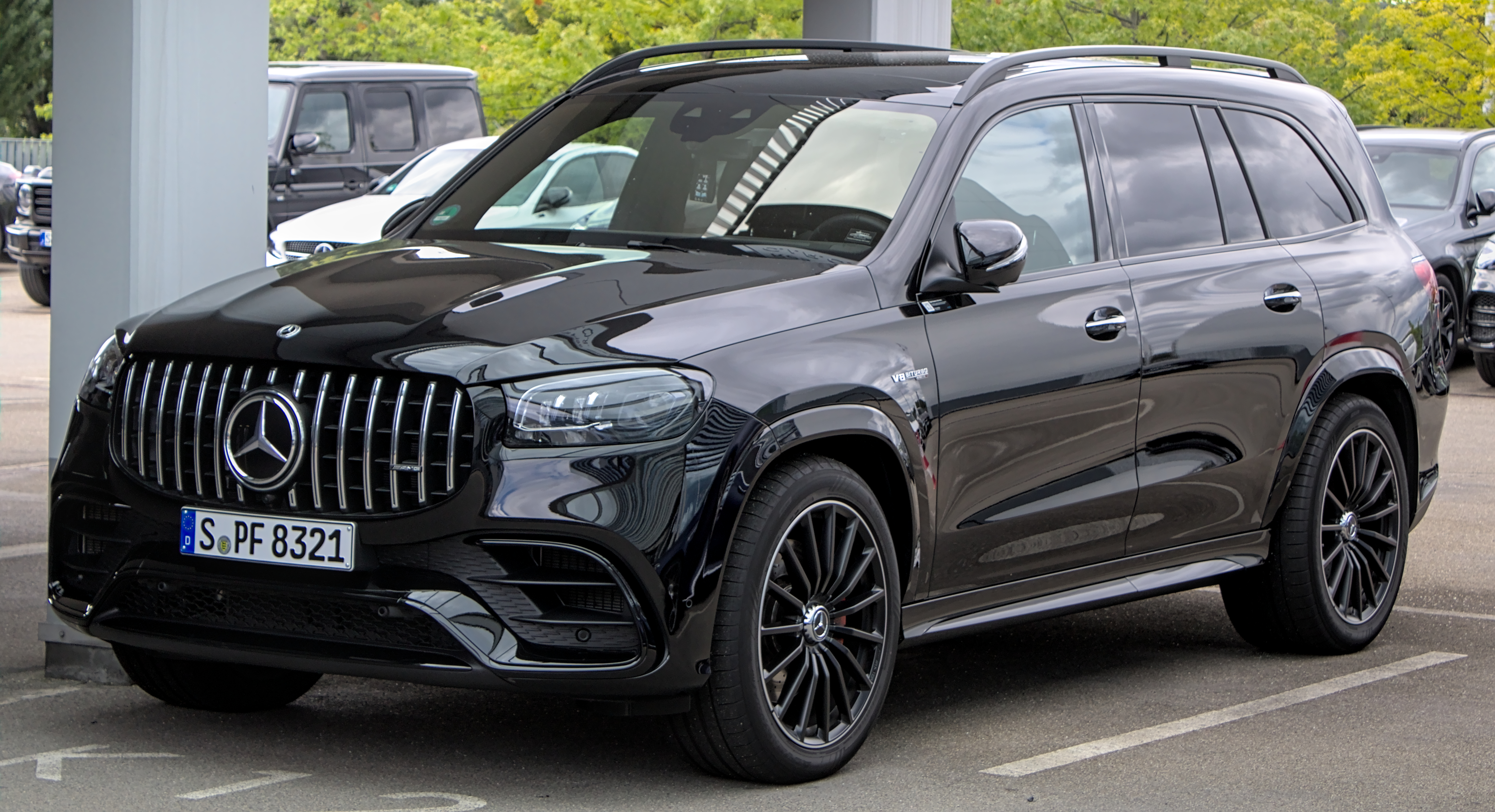
Mercedes-AMG GLS 63 4Matic+

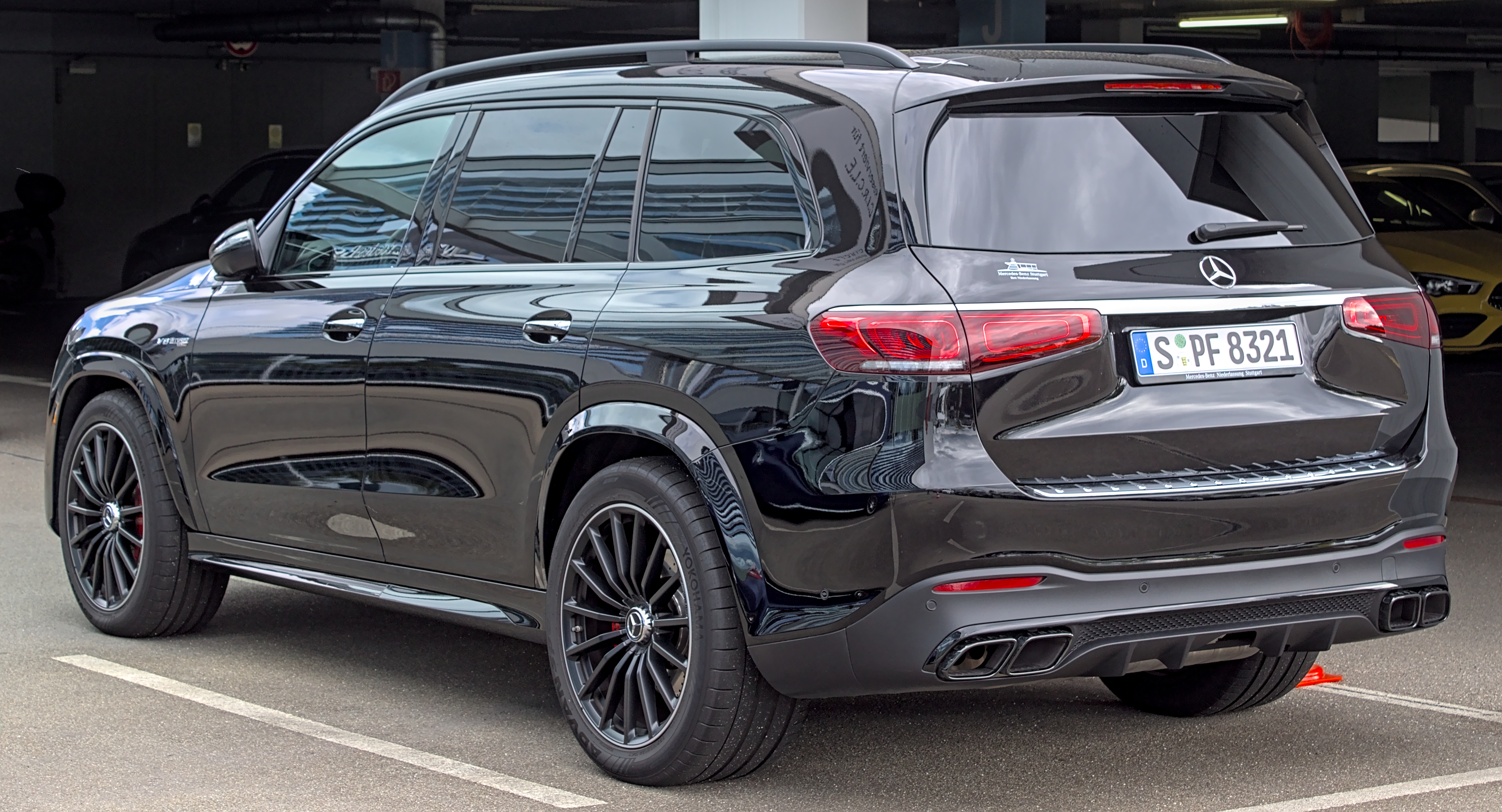
Rear view

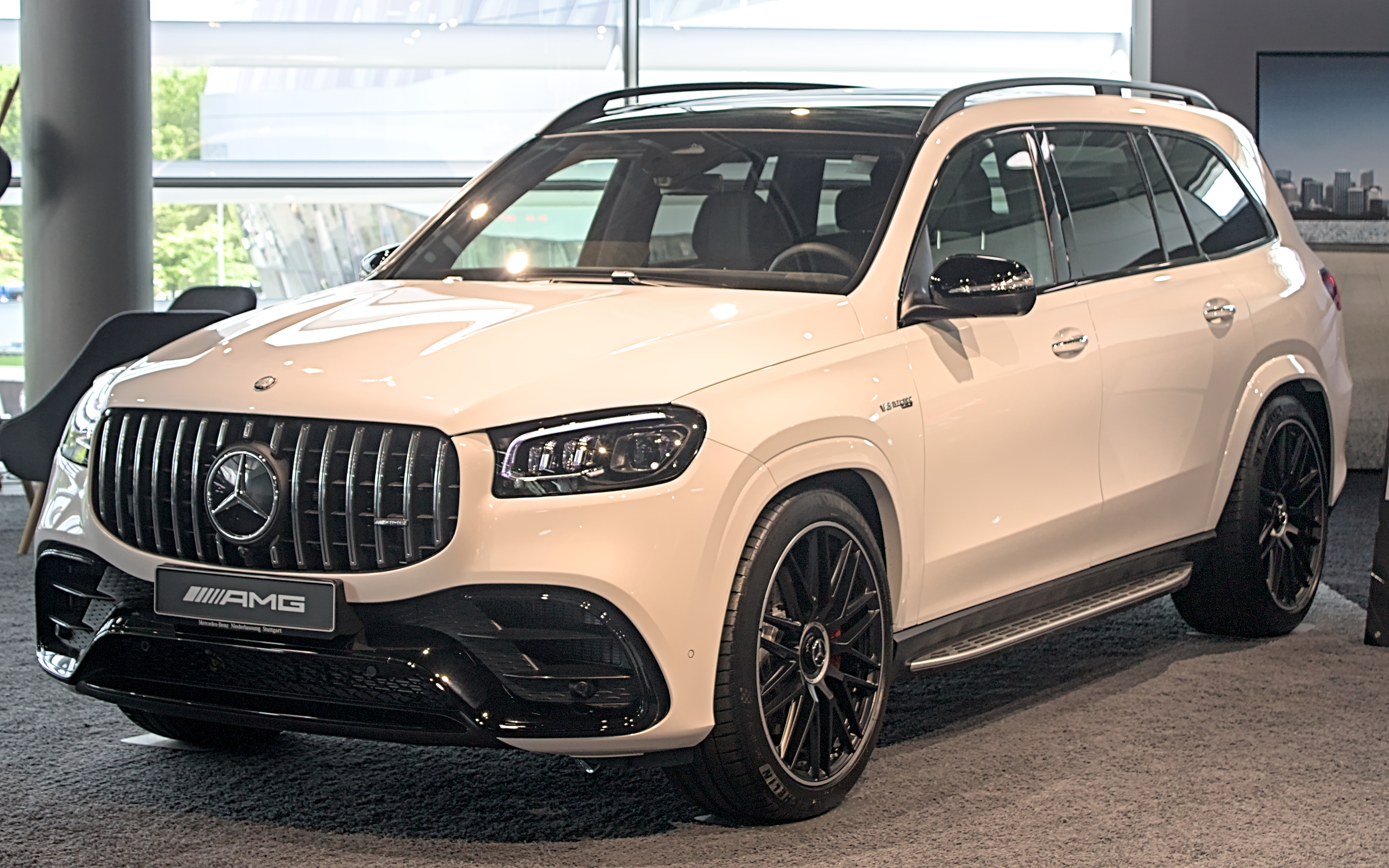
Mercedes-AMG GLS 63 4MATIC+ (2023 Facelift)

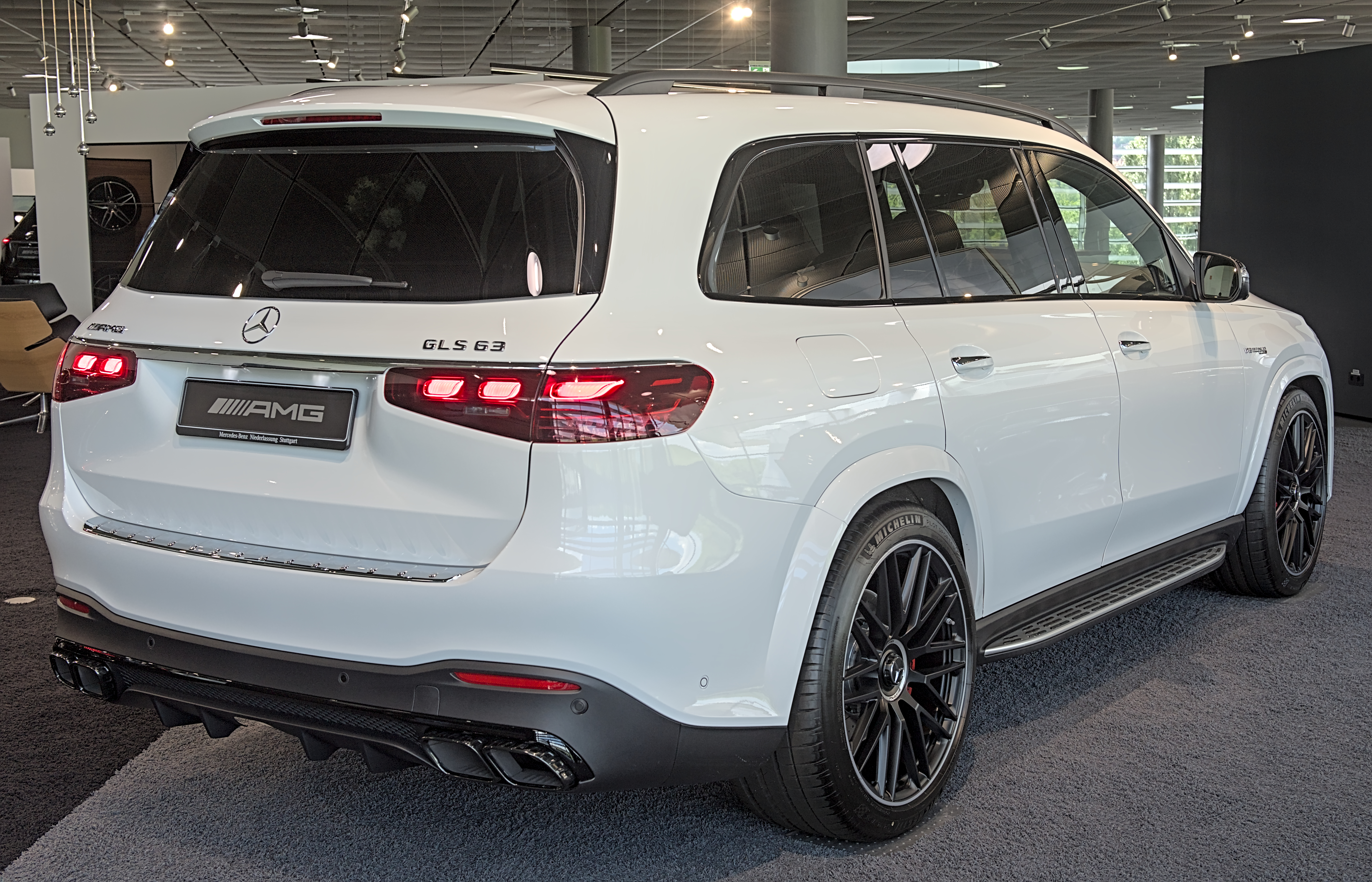
Mercedes-AMG GLS 63 4MATIC+ Rear view

=== Engines (2019–present) ===
Model	Years	Configuration	Displacement	Power	Torque	0–100 km/h (0–62 mph)	Top Speed	Fuel Consumption/Efficiency (EU-Norm combined)
Petrol Engines
GLS 450 4Matic	10/2019–present	Inline-6 turbocharged (M 256 E30 DEH LA G R) + 48V Mild Hybrid EQ Boost	3.0 L (2,999 cc)	270 kW (367 PS; 362 bhp) at 5,900–6,100 rpm (Engine) / 16 kW (22 PS; 21 bhp) (Electric)	500 N⋅m (369 lb⋅ft) (Engine) / 250 N⋅m (184 lb⋅ft) (Electric)	6.2 seconds	240 km/h (149 mph)	19–23 mpg_{‑US} (12–10 L/100 km) (USA)
GLS 580 4Matic	10/2019–present	V8 biturbo (M176) + 48V Mild Hybrid EQ Boost	4.0 L (3,982 cc)	360 kW (489 PS; 483 bhp) at 5,900–6,100 rpm (Engine) / 16 kW (22 PS; 21 bhp) (Electric)	700 N⋅m (516 lb⋅ft) (Engine) / 250 N⋅m (184 lb⋅ft) (Electric)	5.3 seconds	250 km/h (155 mph)	9.8–10.0 L/100 km (24–24 mpg_{‑US})
Maybach GLS 600 4Matic	2020–present	V8 biturbo (M177) + 48V Mild Hybrid EQ Boost	4.0 L (3,982 cc)	410 kW (557 PS; 550 bhp) at 6,000–6,500 rpm (Engine) / 16 kW (22 PS; 21 bhp) (Electric) (comb) 426 kW (579 PS; 571 bhp) at 6,000–6,500 rpm	730 N⋅m (538 lb⋅ft) (Engine) / 250 N⋅m (184 lb⋅ft) (Electric) (comb) 980 N⋅m (723 lb⋅ft)	4.9 seconds	250 km/h (155 mph)	12.0–11.7 L/100 km (19.6–20.1 mpg_{‑US})
AMG GLS 63 4Matic+	2020–present	V8 biturbo (M177) + 48V Mild Hybrid EQ Boost	4.0 L (3,982 cc)	450 kW (612 PS; 603 bhp) at 6,000–6,500 rpm (Engine) / 16 kW (22 PS; 21 bhp) (Electric)	850 N⋅m (627 lb⋅ft) (Engine) / 250 N⋅m (184 lb⋅ft) (Electric)	4.2 seconds	250 km/h (155 mph) / 280 km/h (174 mph) with optional Driver's Package	12.0–11.7 L/100 km (19.6–20.1 mpg_{‑US})
Diesel engines
GLS 350 d 4Matic	10/2019–present	Inline-6 turbocharged (OM 656 D 29 R SCR) + 48V Mild Hybrid EQ Boost	2.9 L (2,925 cc)	210 kW (286 PS; 282 bhp) at 3,400–4,600 rpm	600 N⋅m (443 lbf⋅ft) at 1,200–3,200 rpm	7.0 seconds	227 km/h (141 mph)	7.6–7.9 L/100 km (31–30 mpg_{‑US})
GLS 400 d 4Matic	10/2019–present	Inline-6 turbocharged (OM 656 D 29 SCR) + 48V Mild Hybrid EQ Boost	2.9 L (2,925 cc)	243 kW (330 PS; 326 bhp) at 3,600–4,200 rpm	700 N⋅m (516 lbf⋅ft) at 1,200–3,200 rpm	6.3 seconds	238 km/h (148 mph)	7.6–7.9 L/100 km (31–30 mpg_{‑US})

=== Transmission (2019–present) ===
Model	Years	Types
GLS 450 4Matic	10/2019–present	9-speed automatic 9G-TRONIC
GLS 580 4Matic	10/2019–present	9-speed automatic 9G-TRONIC
AMG GLS 63 4Matic+	2020–present	9-speed automatic 9G-TRONIC AMG SPEEDSHIFT
Maybach GLS 600 4Matic	2020–present	9-speed automatic 9G-TRONIC
GLS 350 d 4Matic	10/2019–present	9-speed automatic 9G-TRONIC
GLS 400 d 4Matic	10/2019–present	9-speed automatic 9G-TRONIC

=== Recall ===
In March 2024, Mercedes-Benz recalled over 116,000 GLE and GLS cars, built from 2019 to 2024, due to a loose 48-volt ground cable that may not have been tightened properly during assembly. The ground cable is located under the front passenger seat that could pose a potential safety risk when the cables become hot.

== 2023 facelift ==
The first facelift for the GLS X167 was unveiled on 4 April 2023 for the 2024 model year. The changes includes a redesigned front fascia with a larger four-louvre grille, updated graphics for the LED taillights and new exterior colours. Inside, the MBUX infotainment system receives new display choices, improved standard features and new trim and upholstery options.

== 2026 facelift ==
The second facelift for the GLS X167 was unveiled on 31 March 2026 for the 2027 model year.
