= Mercedes-AMG SL =

Mercedes-AMG SL is the name given to four automobiles:

- Mercedes-Benz SL-Class (R129)
- Mercedes-Benz SL-Class (R230)
- Mercedes-Benz SL-Class (R231)
- Mercedes-AMG SL-Class (R232)
