= Mercedes-Benz F800 =

Mercedes-Benz F800 Style
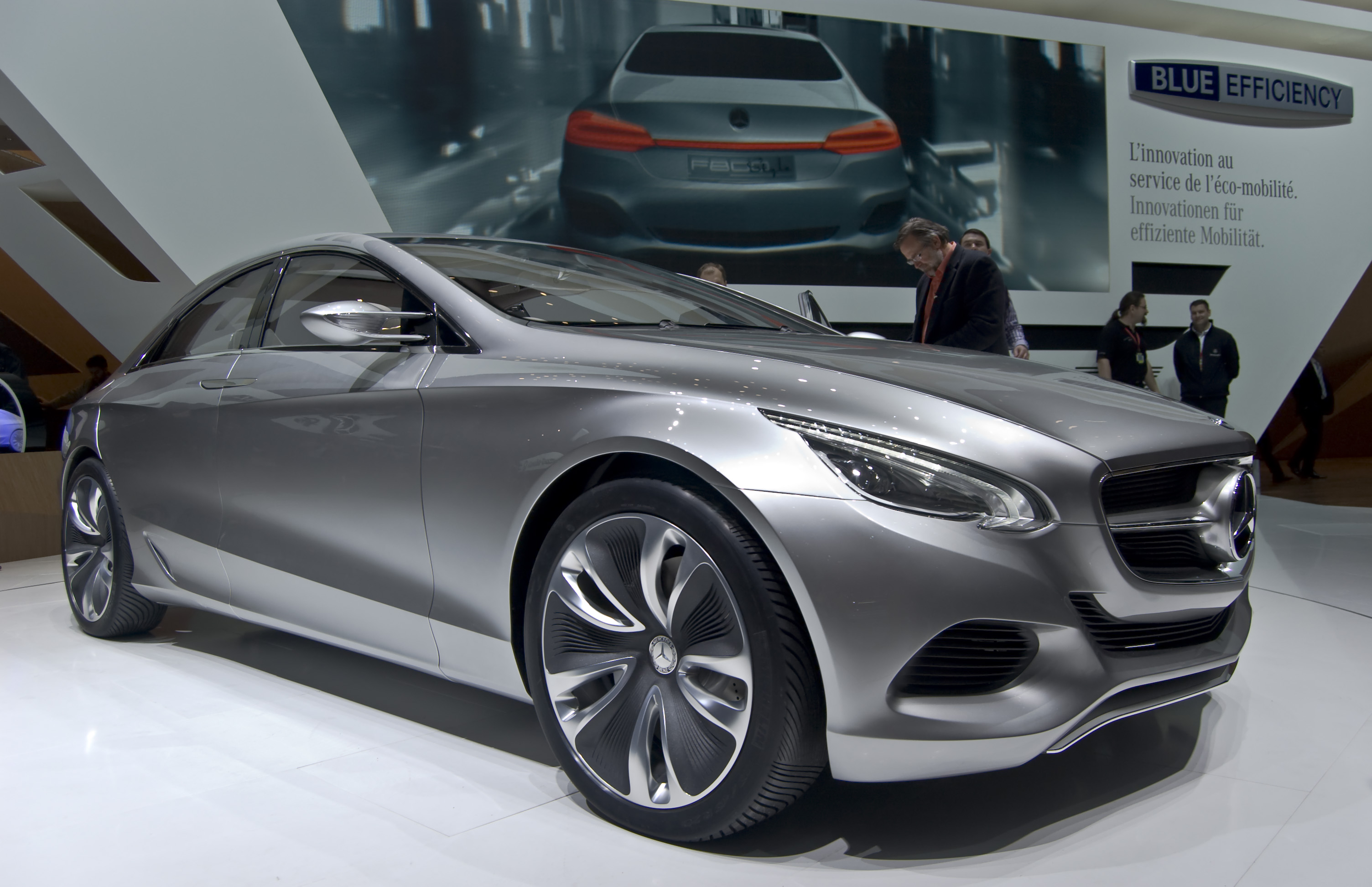

Overview
- Manufacturer: Daimler AG
- Production: 2009 (Concept car)
- Designer: Karim Habib

Body and chassis
- Class: Executive car (E)
- Body style: 4-door saloon
- Layout: Front-engine, rear-wheel-drive
- Doors: Conventional (Front); Sliding (Rear)
- Related: Mercedes-Benz CLS

Powertrain
- Engine: internal combustion engine and electric motor 3.5L M276 DE35 V6 (F800 Style Plug-in Hybrid); Fuel-cell powered (F800 Style F-CELL)
- Electric motor: 109-hp Permanent magnet electric motor (F800 Style Plug-in Hybrid); Synchronous Electric Motor (F800 Style F-CELL)
- Hybrid drivetrain: PHEV (F800 Style Plug-in Hybrid); Fuel-cell Plug-in Hybrid (F800 Style F-CELL)

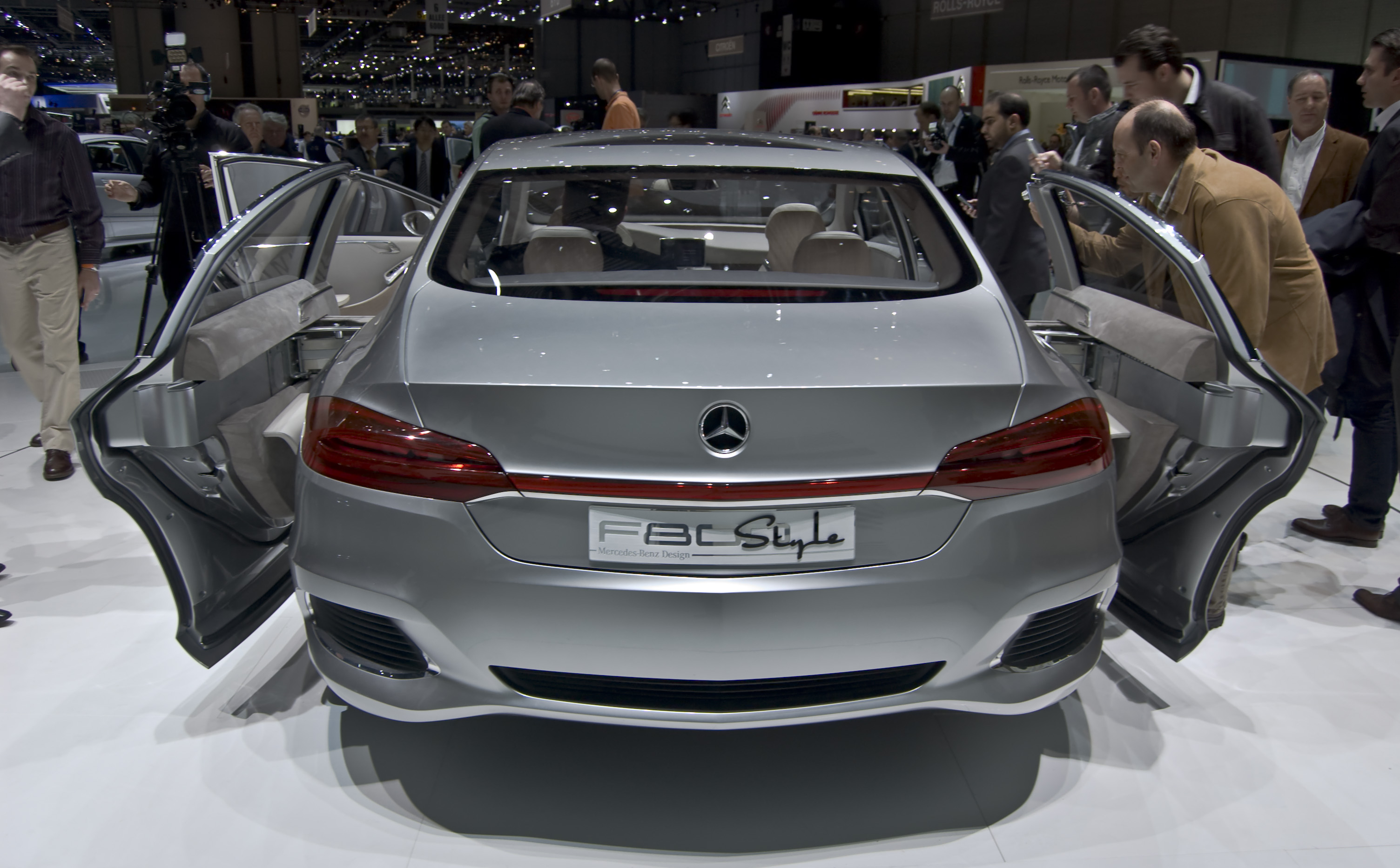
Rear view with all 4 doors open

The Mercedes-Benz F800 Style is a concept car made by the German brand Mercedes-Benz and first shown at the 2010 Geneva Motor Show. It was a preview to the second generation Mercedes-Benz CLS.

== Overview ==
The F800 Style is a 5-seat executive saloon that is powered by efficient drive technologies and expresses the new design language of Mercedes-Benz that would influence several aspects of the brand's subsequent production models. It features a multi drive platform, which is suited for electric drives with fuel cells as well as the use of plug-in hybrids. Long wheelbase, short body overhangs, a coupe-like roof line and the rear sliding doors are the main features of the F800 Style research vehicle. The front of the car is very similar to the SLS AMG model.

== Engine and Drivetrain ==
F800 Style Plug-in Hybrid

Powered by a 3.5-litre V6 petrol engine, the plug-in hybrid version of the concept vehicle has an output of 296 bhp (221 kW; 300 PS). It features the next-generation direct injection and a hybrid module with an output of about 107 bhp (80 kW; 108 PS), delivering a total power of around 403 bhp (301 kW; 409 PS).

The F800 Style has a drive range of 30 km (19 mi) solely on electric power thanks to the lithium-ion battery with a storage capacity of >10 kWh. The battery can be recharged either at a charging station or a household power socket.

The F800 Style is able to reach a top speed of 250 km/h (155 mph) and accelerate from 0 to 100 km/h in 4.8 seconds. In the electric mode the concept reaches a maximum speed of 120 km/h (75 mph).

F800 Style F-CELL

The F800 Style can also be driven using an electric drive based on fuel cell technology. This version has a maximum power output of 100 kW (136 PS; 134 bhp) and a torque of 290 N⋅m (214 lb⋅ft). The concept car is able to reach a maximum speed of 180 km/h (111.8 mph) (electronically limited). The use of the fuel cell technology gives the car a range of almost 600 km (370 mi), with 5.2 kilograms of hydrogen.

== See also ==
- Mercedes-Benz F700
