= Mercedes-Benz GLS =

Luxury motor vehicle produced since 2006

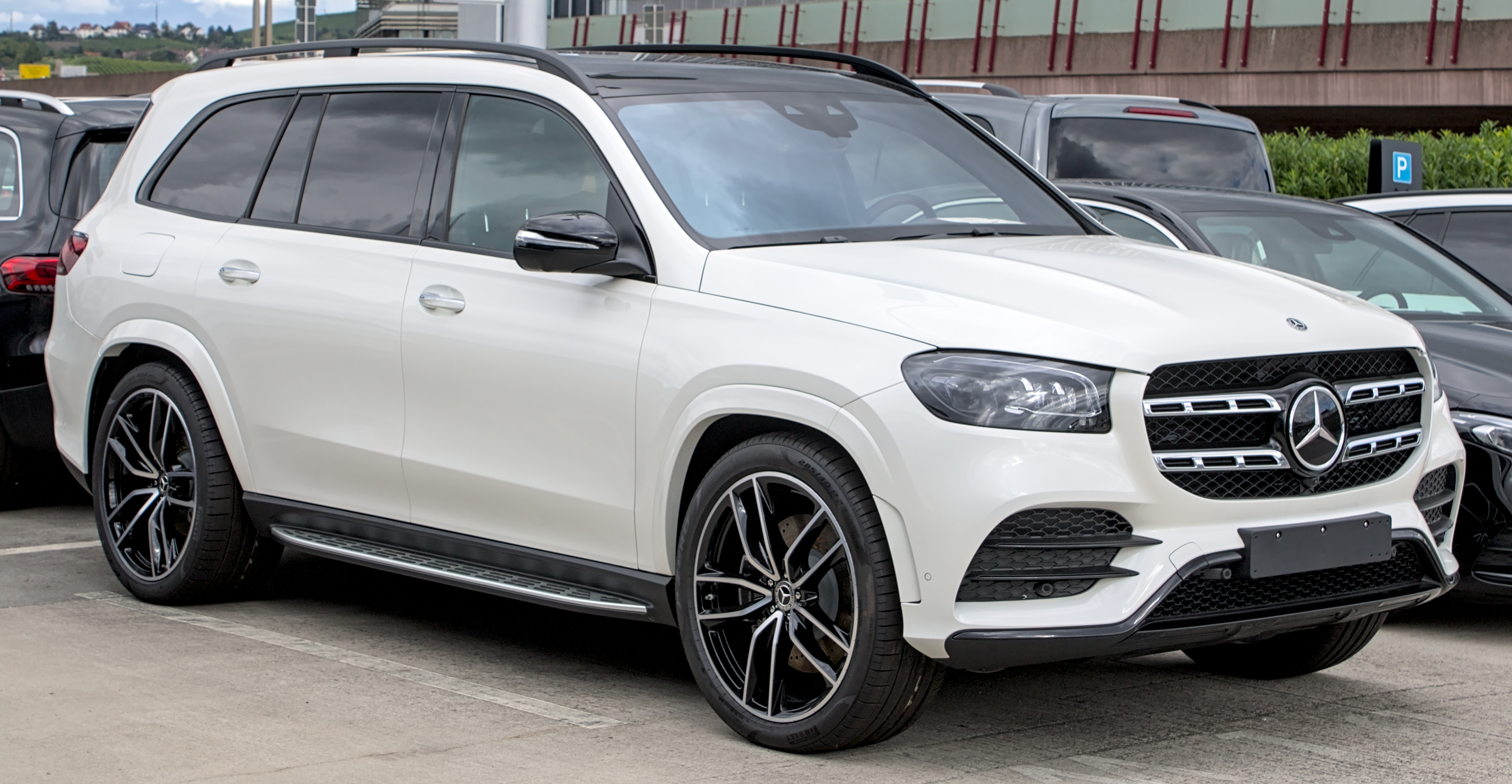

Overview
- Manufacturer: DaimlerChrysler (2006–2007); Daimler AG (2007–2022); Mercedes-Benz Group (2022–present)
- Production: 2006–2015 (GL-Class); 2015–present (GLS)
- Model years: 2007–2016 (GL-Class); 2017–present (GLS)

Body and chassis
- Class: Full-size luxury crossover SUV
- Layout: Front-engine, four-wheel drive (4Matic)
- Related: Mercedes-Benz ML-Class/GLE

The Mercedes-Benz GLS, formerly Mercedes-Benz GL-Class, is a full-size luxury crossover SUV produced by Mercedes-Benz since 2006. In each of its generations it is a three-row, seven-passenger vehicle positioned above the GLE (formerly Mercedes-Benz M-Class before 2016). The GLS is considered the flagship of the marque's SUV lineup, although the body-on-frame G-Class (originally intended for military off-roading but also offered in luxurious trims) is more expensive and has been in production longer.

The GLS shares the same unibody architecture with the GLE. Most GLS vehicles are assembled at the Mercedes plant in Alabama, except for a number of early 2007 production vehicles which were manufactured in Germany. The first generation model (X164) was manufactured between 2006 and 2012 and was replaced in 2013 by the new generation GL-Class (X166).

From 2016 with the release of the facelifted second generation model, the GL-Class was renamed to GLS as per the revised nomenclature adopted by Mercedes. Under this scheme, SUVs use the base name "GL", followed by the model's placement in Mercedes-Benz hierarchy. The "G" is for geländewagen (German for off-road vehicle) and alludes the long-running G-Class. This is followed by the letter "L" that acts as a linkage with the letter "S", the SUV equivalent to the S-Class, marketing the GLS as the corresponding SUV to the S-Class full-size sedan.

== First generation (X164; 2006) ==
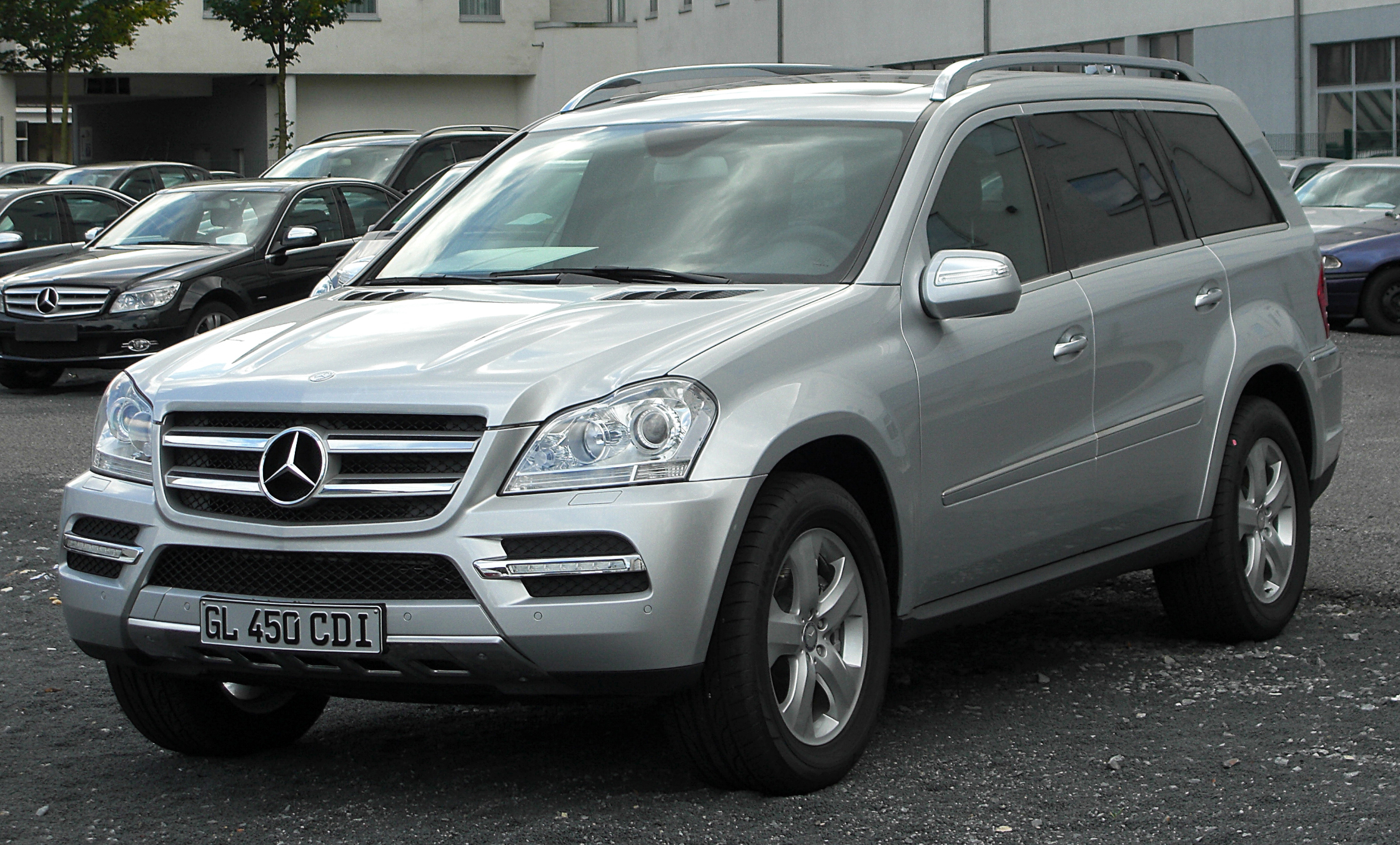
X164 GL-Class

The X164 GL-Class debuted at the 2006 North American International Auto Show. It was released around the same time as the similarly sized Audi Q7, and was the first full-size, 7-seater SUV produced by a German automaker. The range of engines consists of V8 petrol engines, and turbocharged V6 and V8 diesel engines. All models are available only in all-wheel drive (4MATIC) configuration.

== Second generation (X166; 2012) ==
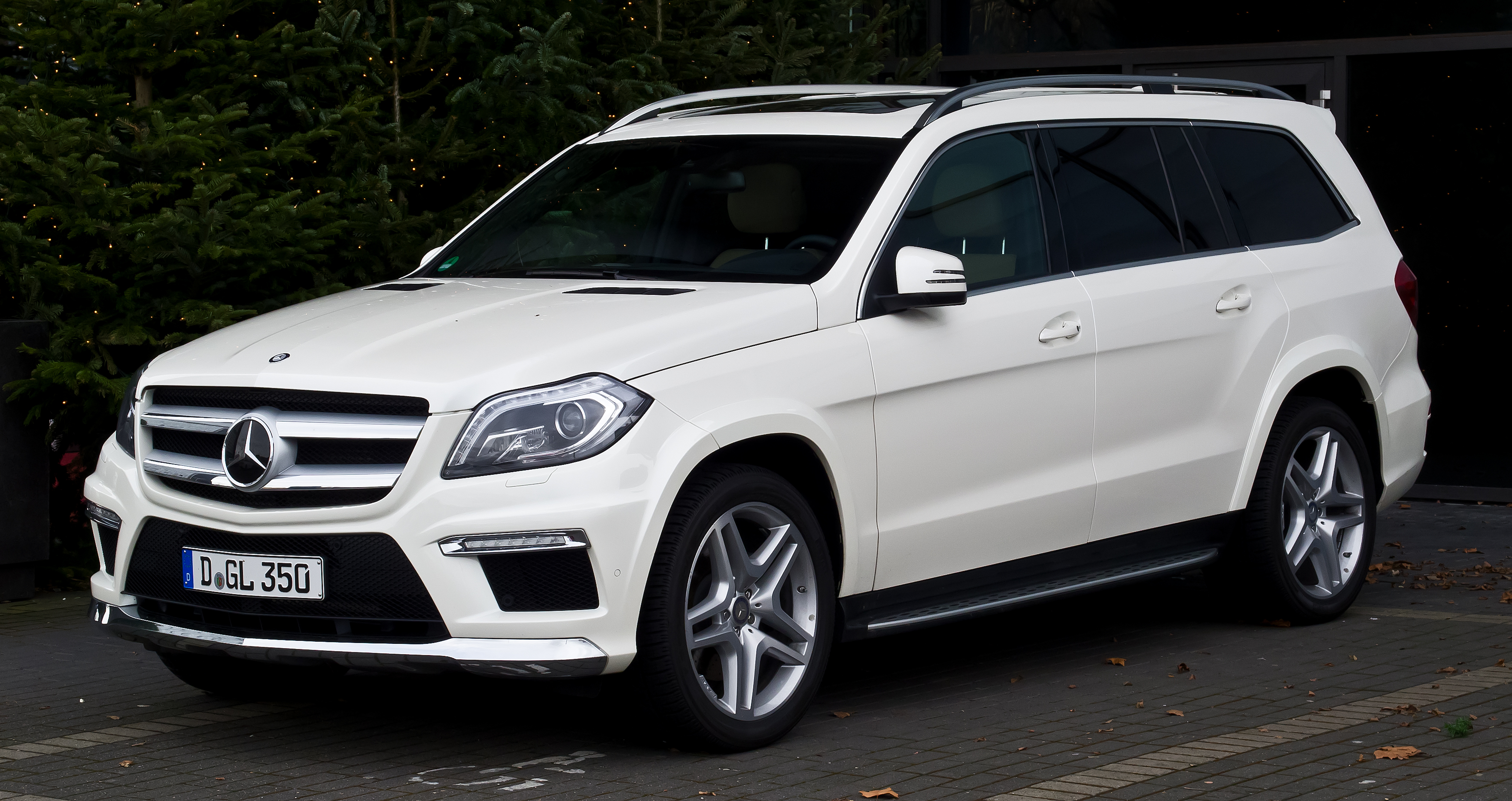
X166 GL-Class

The X166 GL-Class went on sale in September 2012. Models feature efficiency improvements via the addition of an engine start stop system, drive by wire steering, and new turbocharged petrol and diesel engines. The second generation model also introduced a high performance GL63 AMG variant, powered by the hand-built M157 engine. Following a 2016 facelift it was renamed the GLS, to correspond with the new Mercedes-Benz naming scheme. The model update also featured minor exterior and interior design changes and performance improvements.

== Third generation (X167; 2019) ==
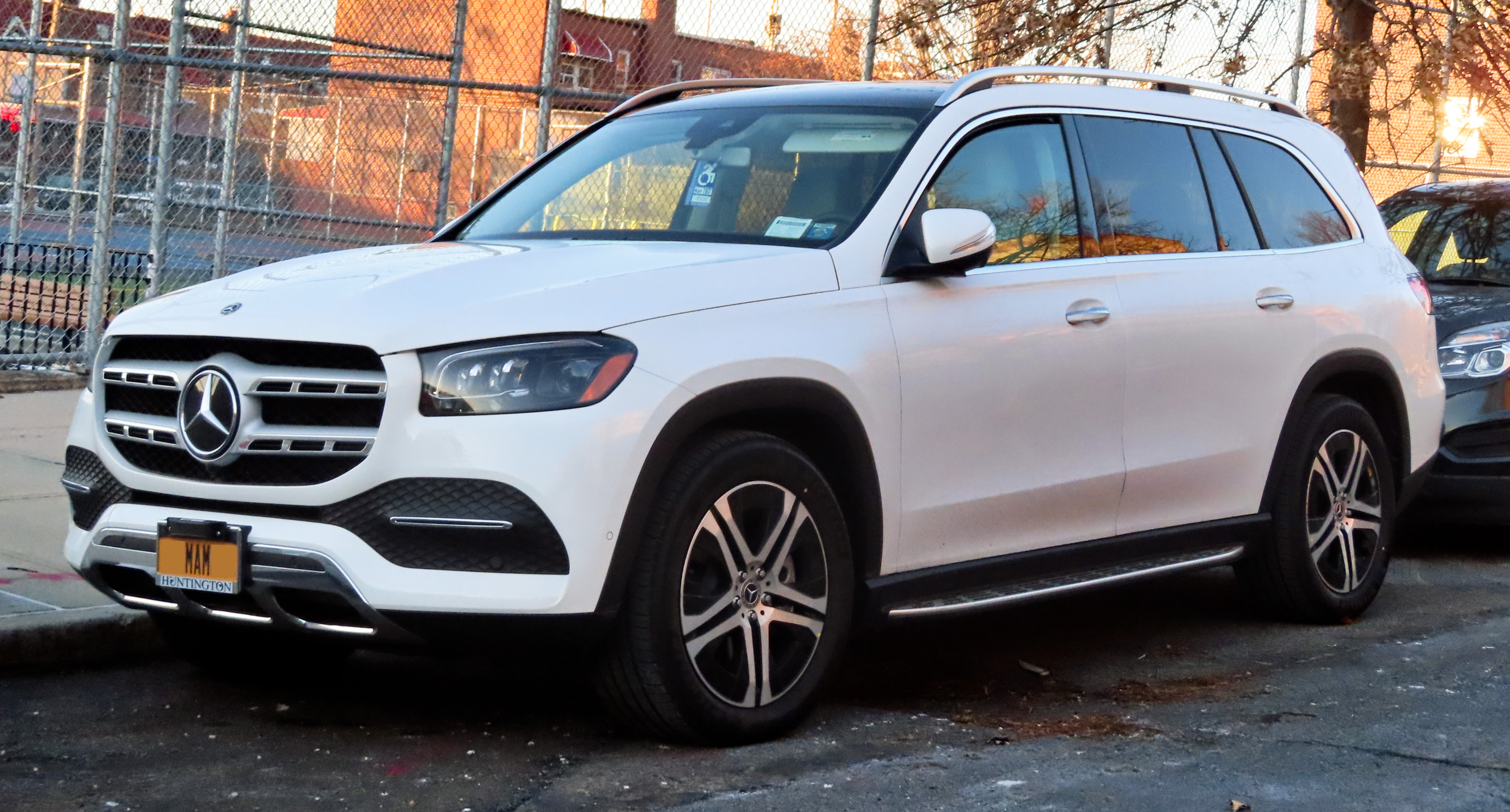
X167 GLS-Class

The third generation model debuted at the 2019 New York International Auto Show. The engine options at the launch are 3.0-litre turbo inline six (GLS 450 4MATIC) and 4.0-litre twin-turbo V8 (GLS 580 4MATIC & AMG GLS 63), both petrol with EQ Boost electric motors, and 2.9-litre twin-turbo diesel inline six in two different outputs (GLS 350 d 4MATIC and GLS 450 d 4MATIC). A first SUV version of Mercedes-Maybach, Mercedes-Maybach GLS 600 4MATIC model was released in late 2019.

The wheelbase is 2.3 inches longer and nearly an inch wider. It uses the same architecture as the latest GLE with MBUX and dual 12.3-inch screens as well as E-Active Body Control and car-to-X communication. The exterior has also been redesigned with sleeker headlamps and taillamps.

== Sales ==
| Year | Europe | U.S. | China | |
| Year | Europe | U.S. | GLS | Maybach GLS |
|---|---|---|---|---|
| 2006 | 3,007 | 18,776 | | |
| 2007 | 8,027 | 26,396 | | |
| 2008 | 4,227 | 23,328 | | |
| 2009 | 2,871 | 15,012 | | |
| 2010 | 2,249 | 19,943 | | |
| 2011 | 2,508 | 25,139 | | |
| 2012 | 1,573 | 26,042 | | |
| 2013 | 4,829 | 29,912 | | |
| 2014 | 4,187 | 26,597 | | |
| 2015 | 3,753 | 27,707 | | |
| 2016 | 5,361 | 30,442 | | |
| 2017 | 4,537 | 32,248 | | |
| 2018 | 3,534 | 21,973 | | |
| 2019 | 2,386 | 22,223 | | |
| 2020 | 4,795 | 16,928 | | |
| 2021 | 4,110 | 24,482 | | |
| 2022 | | | | |
| 2023 | | | 18,090 | 3,167 |
| 2024 | | | 14,068 | 2,866 |
| 2025 | | | 9,082 | 1,708 |
