= Mercedes-Benz M278 engine =

Mercedes-Benz M278/M157
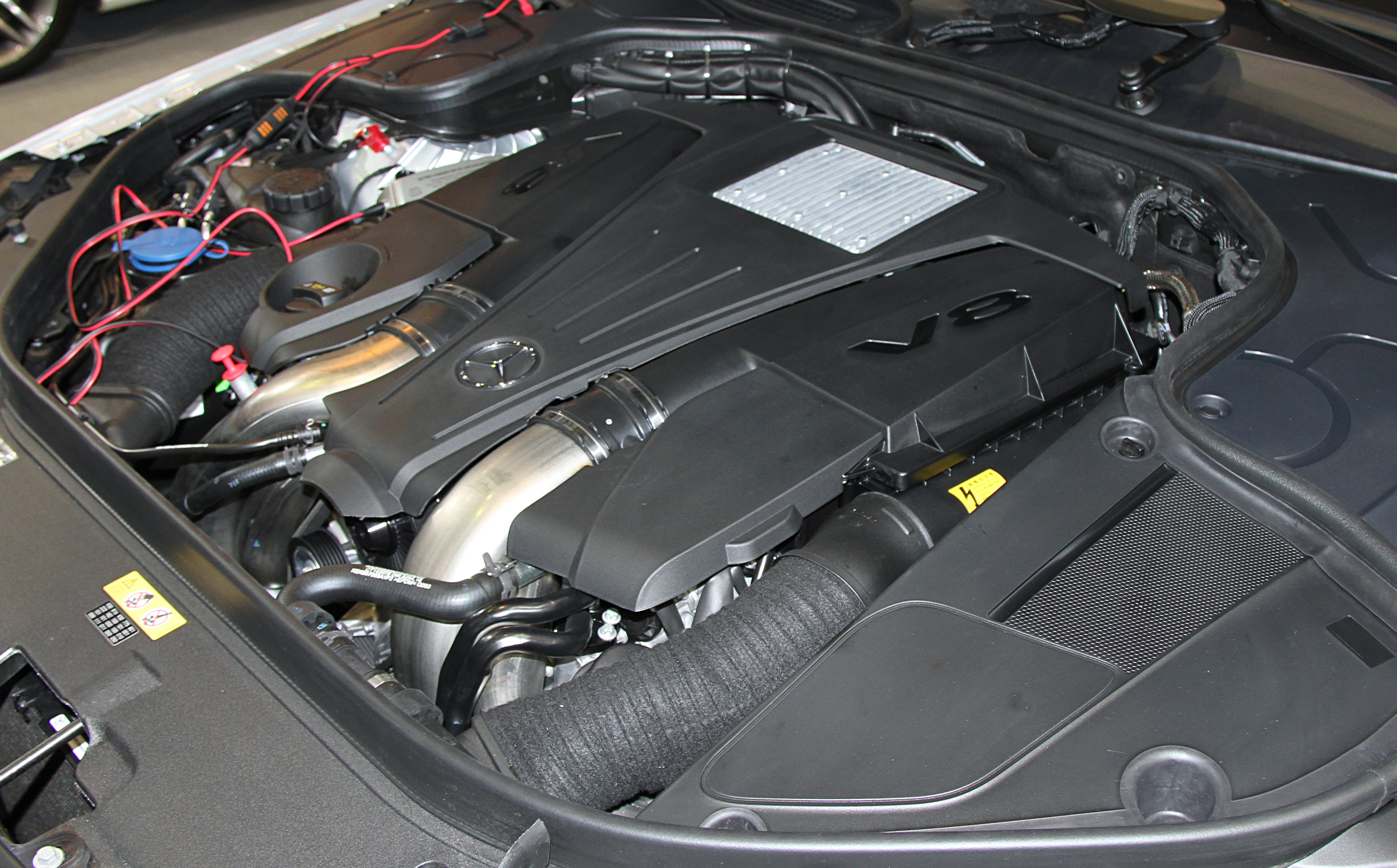

Overview
- Manufacturer: Mercedes-Benz; Mercedes-AMG (AMG)
- Production: 2010–2020

Layout
- Configuration: 90° V8
- Displacement: 4.7 L; 284.6 cu in (4,663 cc) (M278); 5.5 L; 333.3 cu in (5,461 cc) (M157)
- Cylinder bore: 92.9 mm (3.66 in); 98 mm (3.86 in)
- Piston stroke: 86 mm (3.39 in); 90.5 mm (3.56 in)
- Cylinder block material: Aluminium
- Valvetrain: DOHC 4 valves x cyl. with VVT

Combustion
- Turbocharger: Honeywell Bi-turbos
- Fuel system: Direct injection
- Fuel type: Gasoline
- Cooling system: Water-cooled

Output
- Power output: 300–430 kW (408–585 PS; 402–577 bhp)
- Torque output: 540–900 N⋅m (398–664 lb⋅ft)

Chronology
- Predecessor: Mercedes-Benz M273; Mercedes-Benz M156
- Successor: Mercedes-Benz M176/M177/M178

The Mercedes-Benz M278 is a family of direct injected, Bi-turbocharged, V8 gasoline automotive piston engines.

The M278 is derived from the company's previous M273 V8 engine, sharing its bore pitch, aluminium engine block, and Silitec aluminium/silicon low-friction cylinder liners. ( There is contrasting information that after engine # 2789xx 30 266191 they changed over to "cast-in" iron liners.) In contrast to the port-injected M273, the M278 features gasoline direct injection, with piezo-electrically actuated fuel injectors for more precise fuel delivery, and multi-spark ignition, which enables the spark plugs to be fired multiple times over the combustion sequence for more efficient combustion. Other changes relative to the M273 include an increased adjustment range for the variable valve timing system, a new timing chain arrangement, and new engine accessories (such as the oil pump, water pump, fuel pump, and alternator) which reduce parasitic loads. Many of these new features are shared with the M276 V6 engine family, which was announced at the same time.

While the M273 was naturally aspirated, the M278 features twin turbochargers from Honeywell, one per cylinder bank, producing 0.9 bar (13 psi) boost pressure in most configurations.

Mercedes-Benz estimated that these changes, with vehicle modifications such as a stop-start system, give the 4.7–litre M278 22% lower fuel consumption and CO_{2} emissions than the 5.5–litre M273 while producing more power 320 kW (435 PS; 429 bhp) versus 285 kW (387 PS; 382 bhp) and torque 700 N⋅m (516 lb⋅ft) versus 530 N⋅m (391 lb⋅ft).

The entire M278 lineup avoids the United States Gas Guzzler Tax, a first for V8 production engines from Mercedes-Benz.

== M278 ==
The basic M278 has a displacement of 4,663 cc (4.7 L; 284.6 cu in) with a bore and stroke of 92.9 mm × 86 mm (3.66 in × 3.39 in). Output is 320 kW (429 bhp; 435 PS) at 5,250 rpm with 700 N⋅m (516 lb⋅ft) of torque at 1,800-3,500 rpm for S-Class, CL-Class, SL-Class, and GL-Class models. CLS-Class, E-Class, and M-Class models are detuned to 300 kW (402 bhp; 408 PS) with 600 N⋅m (443 lb⋅ft) of torque at 1,600 rpm. Although it no longer corresponds with the engine displacement, all of the above models are still badged as "550". The GL-Class, besides the GL550 above, also features the GL450 trim that carries a detuned version of the 4.7 L engine making 270 kW (362 bhp; 367 PS) and 550 N⋅m (406 lb⋅ft)

For 2014 S-Class models (chassis code W222), power is increased to 335 kW (449 bhp; 455 PS) at 5,250 rpm, while torque remains at 700 N⋅m (516 lb⋅ft) between 1,800-3,500 rpm. .

These engines are mated to the 7G-Tronic 7-speed automatic transmission, and the new 9G-Tronic 9-speed automatic transmission.

Applications:

- 2011–2017 S 500/S 550
- 2011–2014 CL 500/CL 550
- 2015–2017 S 500 Coupé/S 550 Coupé
- 2011–2018 CLS 500/CLS 550
- 2012–2020 SL 500/SL 550
- 2012–2014 E 500/E 550
- 2012–2014 ML 500/ML 550
- 2013–2014 GL 450
- 2013–2019 GL 500/GLS 500/GL 550/GLS 550

== M157 AMG ==
The second variant, designated M157, is tuned by Mercedes-AMG for use in higher-performance models. This version has a displacement of 5,461 cc (5.5 L) with a bore and stroke of 98 mm × 90.5 mm (3.86 in × 3.56 in). Increased power and torque comes from the increased displacement as well as higher boost pressure of 1 bar (15 psi).

There are six states of output with the M157. For the S-Class and CL-Class, power is 400 kW (544 PS; 536 bhp) at 5,500 rpm with 800 N⋅m (590 lb⋅ft) of torque at 2,000-4,500 rpm, or 420 kW (571 PS; 563 bhp) at 5,500 rpm with 900 N⋅m (664 lb⋅ft) of torque at 2,500-3,750 rpm with the optional AMG Performance Package. For the 2013-15 SL-Class, power is 395 kW (537 PS; 530 bhp) or 415 kW (564 PS; 557 bhp) with the optional AMG Performance Package. For the 2012-2013 E-Class and CLS-Class, power is 386 kW (525 PS; 518 bhp) with 700 N⋅m (516 lb⋅ft) of torque in standard tune, or 410 kW (557 PS; 550 bhp) with 800 N⋅m (590 lb⋅ft) of torque with the AMG Performance Package. Beginning with the 2014 E-Class and CLS-Class, power increases to 410 kW (557 PS; 550 bhp) 720 N⋅m (531 lb⋅ft) of torque for standard tune, or 430 kW (585 PS; 577 bhp) with 800 N⋅m (590 lb⋅ft) of torque for "S-Model" variants. At the same time for SL-Class, power increases to 430 kW (585 PS; 577 bhp) and 900 N⋅m (664 lb⋅ft).

These engines are mated to the AMG Speedshift MCT 7-speed semi-automatic transmission, which replaces the 7G-Tronic's torque converter with a wet clutch pack. Note that this MCT 7-speed can handle considerably more torque and is not the same unit as the dual-clutch transmission found on the Mercedes-Benz SLS AMG.

Applications:

- 2011–2013 S 63 AMG
- 2013–2017 S 63 AMG
- 2011–2014 CL 63 AMG
- 2012–2018 CLS 63 AMG
- 2012–2015 ML 63 AMG
- 2015–2019 AMG GLE 63
- 2012–2016 GL 63 AMG
- 2016–2019 AMG GLS 63
- 2013–2018 G 63 AMG
- 2012–2016 E 63 AMG
- 2012–2019 SL 63 AMG
- 2013–2015 Mercedes-AMG G 63 6x6

The M157 engine will replace the previous M156 in most of the AMG lineup. Despite the 5.5–litre displacement, all models are designated "63" for marketing purposes.

== M152 ==
The third variant, designated M152, is a naturally aspirated derivative of the M157 engine, sharing the same displacement, direct injection, and many other features. The M152 engine includes a cylinder deactivation variable displacement system for improved fuel economy (up to 30 percent better than the M113 E55 engine used in the previous model). Output is 310 kW (421 PS; 416 bhp) at 6,800 rpm, with 540 N⋅m (398 lb⋅ft) of torque at 4,500 rpm.

Applications

- 2012–2016 SLK 55 AMG (R172)
