= Mercedes-Benz CLS-Class (C218) =

Second generation of Mercedes-Benz CLS-Class

Mercedes-Benz CLS (C218/X218)
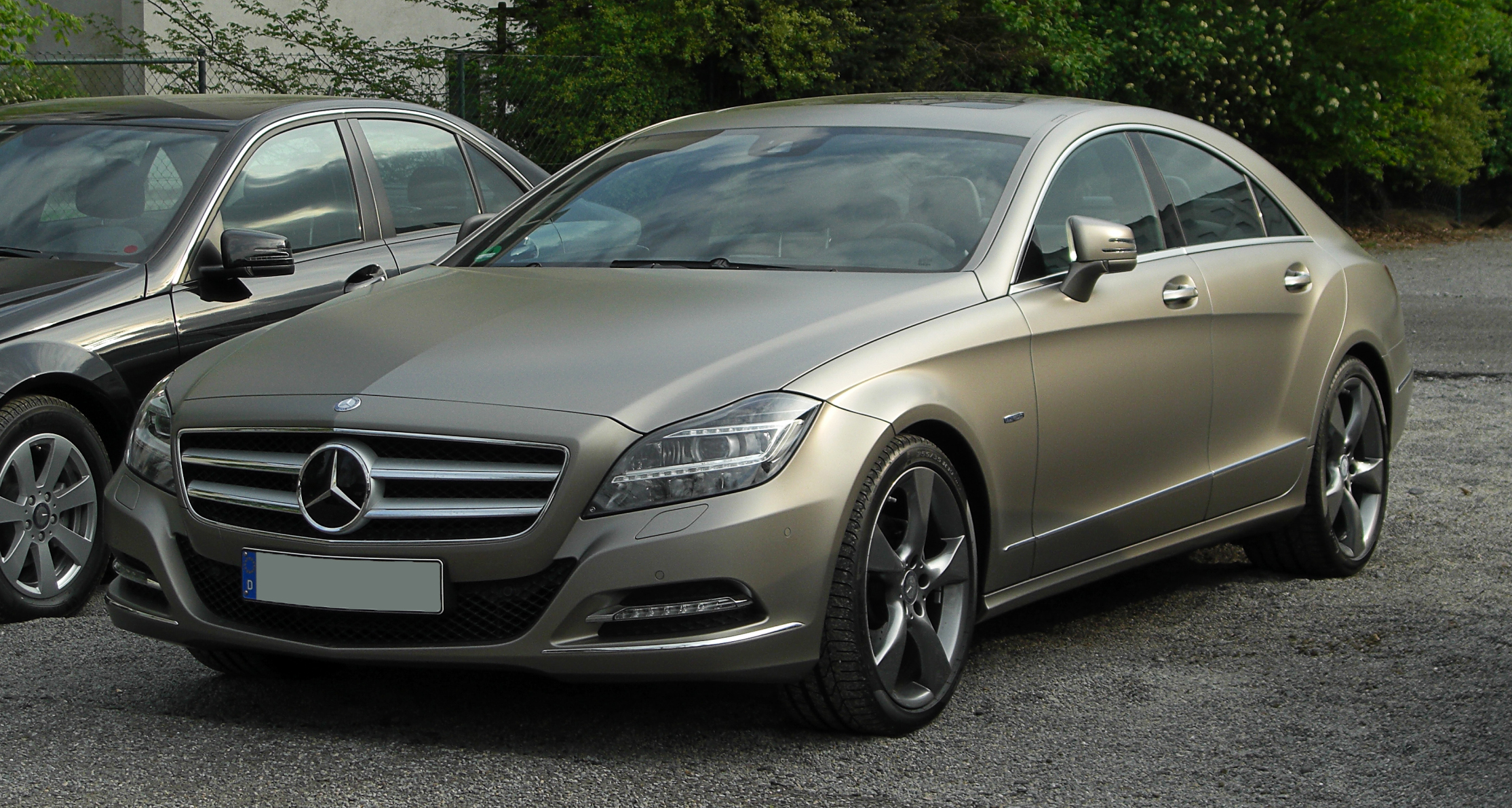

Overview
- Manufacturer: Daimler AG
- Production: January 2011 – December 2017
- Assembly: Germany: Sindelfingen
- Designer: Gorden Wagener (2006)

Body and chassis
- Class: Executive (E)
- Body style: 4-door saloon (C218); 5-door shooting brake (X218)
- Layout: Front-engine, rear-wheel-drive; Front-engine, all-wheel-drive (4Matic)
- Related: Mercedes-Benz E-Class (W212)

Powertrain
- Engine: petrol: 3.0 L M276 V6; 3.5 L M276 V6; 4.7 L M278 twin-turbo V8; 5.5 L M157 twin-turbo V8; diesel: 2.1 L OM651 twin-turbo I4; 3.0 L OM642 turbo V6
- Transmission: 7-speed 7G-Tronic automatic; 9-speed 9G-Tronic automatic

Dimensions
- Wheelbase: 2,874 mm (113.1 in)
- Length: 4,937 mm (194.4 in) (C218); 4,998 mm (196.8 in) (CLS63); 4,953 mm (195.0 in) (X218)
- Width: 1,881 mm (74.1 in)
- Height: 1,418 mm (55.8 in) (C218); 1,419 mm (55.9 in) (X218)
- Kerb weight: 1,660–1,950 kg (3,660–4,299 lb)

Chronology
- Predecessor: Mercedes-Benz CLS-Class (C219)
- Successor: Mercedes-Benz CLS-Class (C257)

The C218 Mercedes-Benz CLS is the second generation of the Mercedes CLS-Class range of four-door coupé sedans. The model shares the chassis and most of the technology with the W212 E-Class and was produced from 2011 to 2017.

Unlike its predecessor, the C218/X218 CLS can be optioned with all-wheel drive 4MATIC on all models including CLS 63 AMG variants. Mercedes also introduced a new five-door estate version to the CLS lineup, called the CLS Shooting Brake.

The C218 CLS-Class was succeeded by the Mercedes-Benz CLS-Class (C257) in 2018.

== Development and launch ==
The design of the C218 CLS is based on the F800 Style concept car unveiled by Mercedes-Benz at the 2009 Geneva Motor Show. It is a four-door coupé featuring a new COMAND interface utilizing a touchpad, design cues inspired by the Mercedes SLS AMG, and sliding rear doors. The production version C218 CLS was publicly unveiled at the 2010 Paris Motor Show and as with the previous generation, is based on the E-Class platform, utilising the same rear multi-link suspension setup.

== Body styles ==
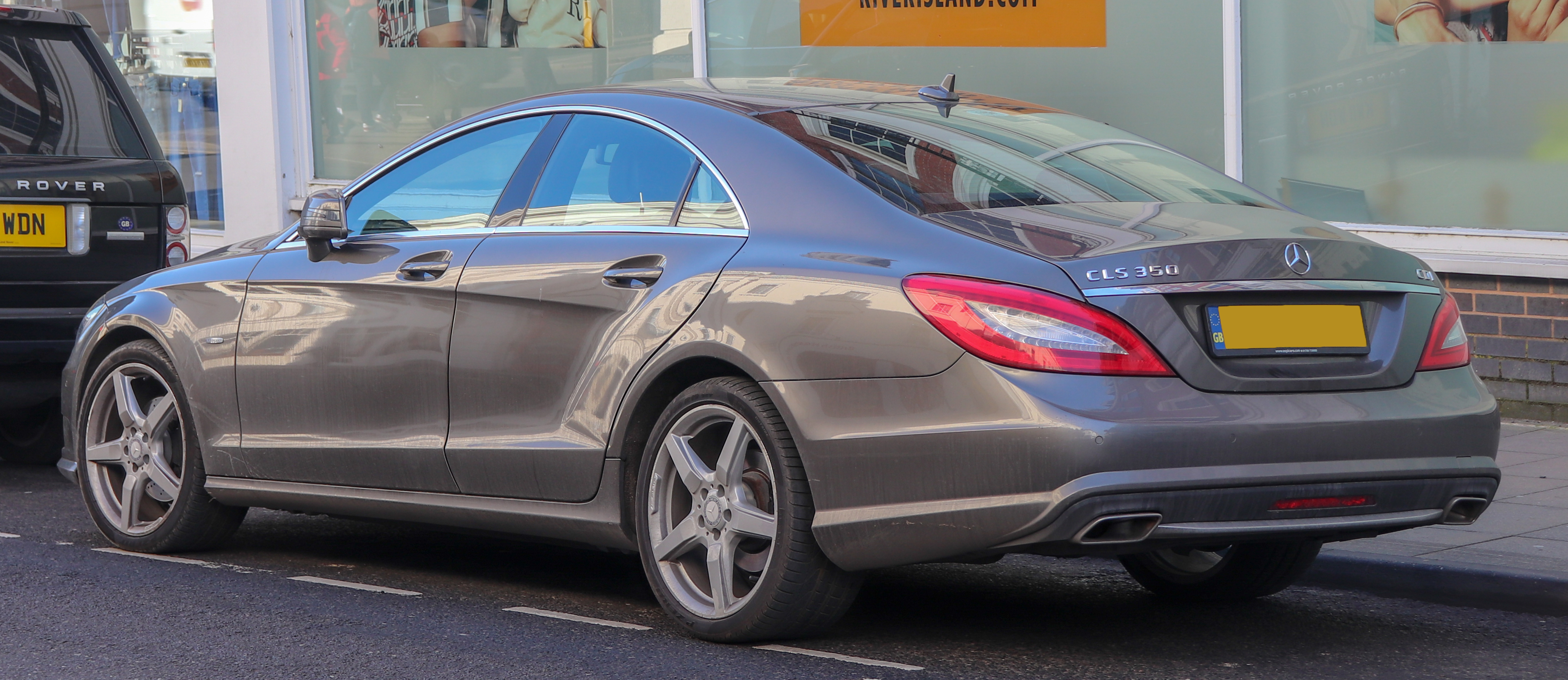
C218 sedan

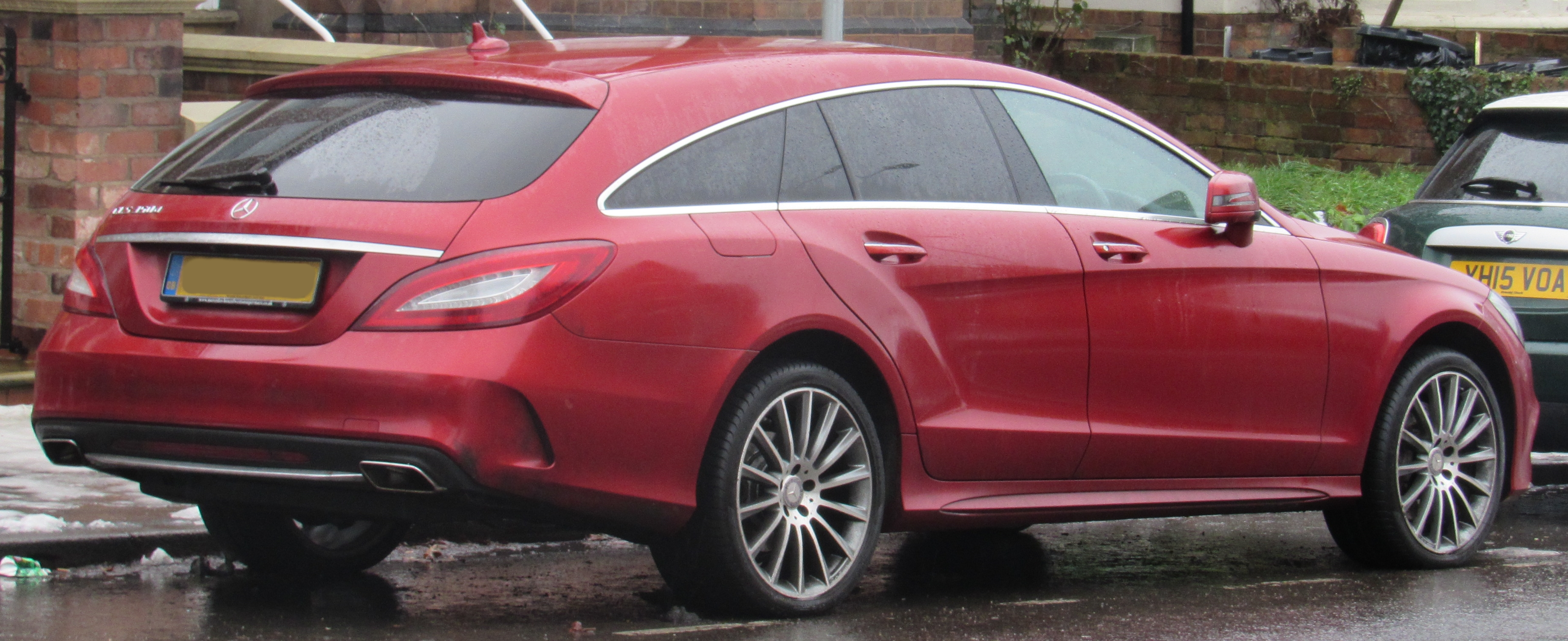
X218 Shooting Brake

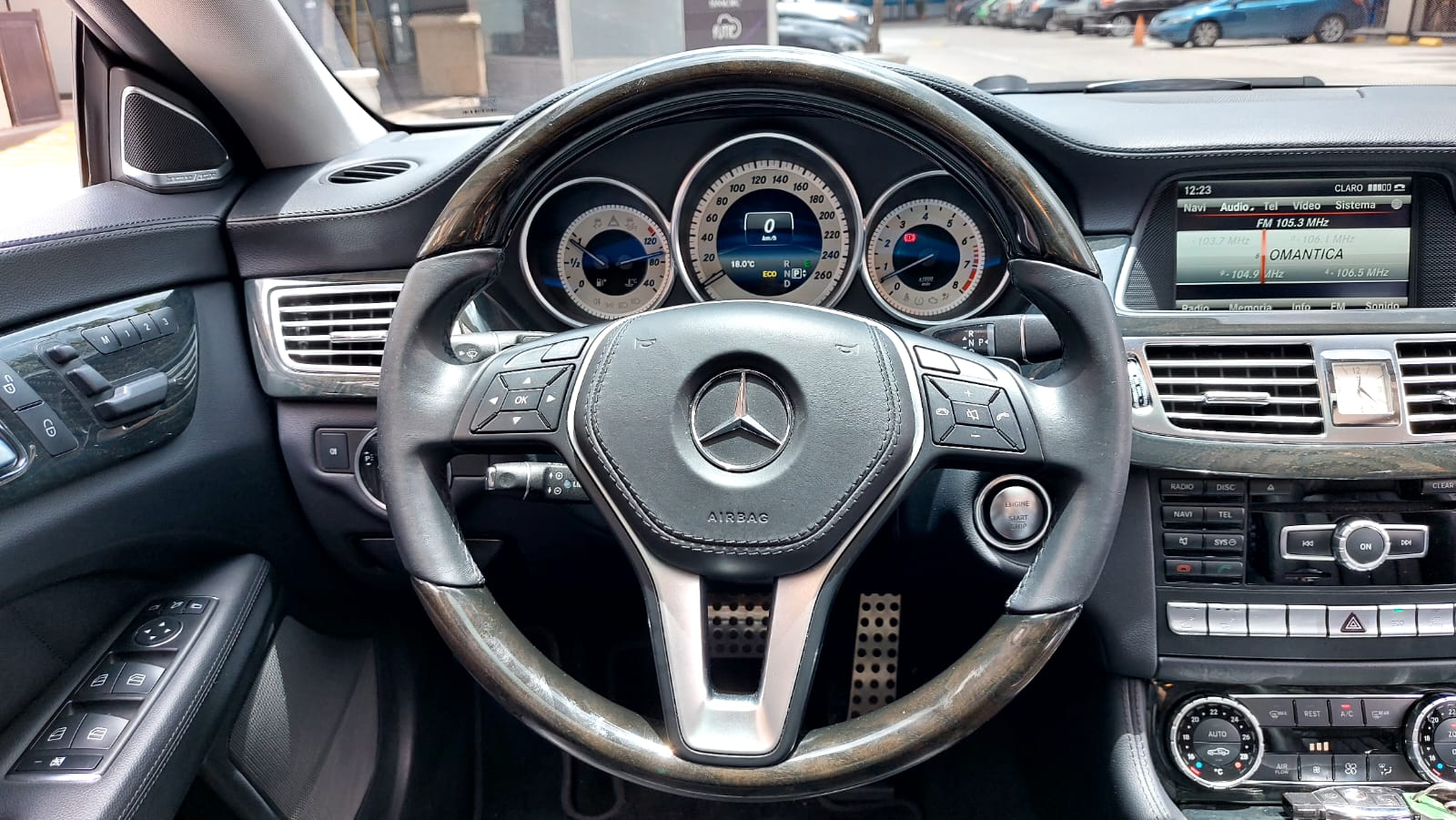
Interior CLS 2014

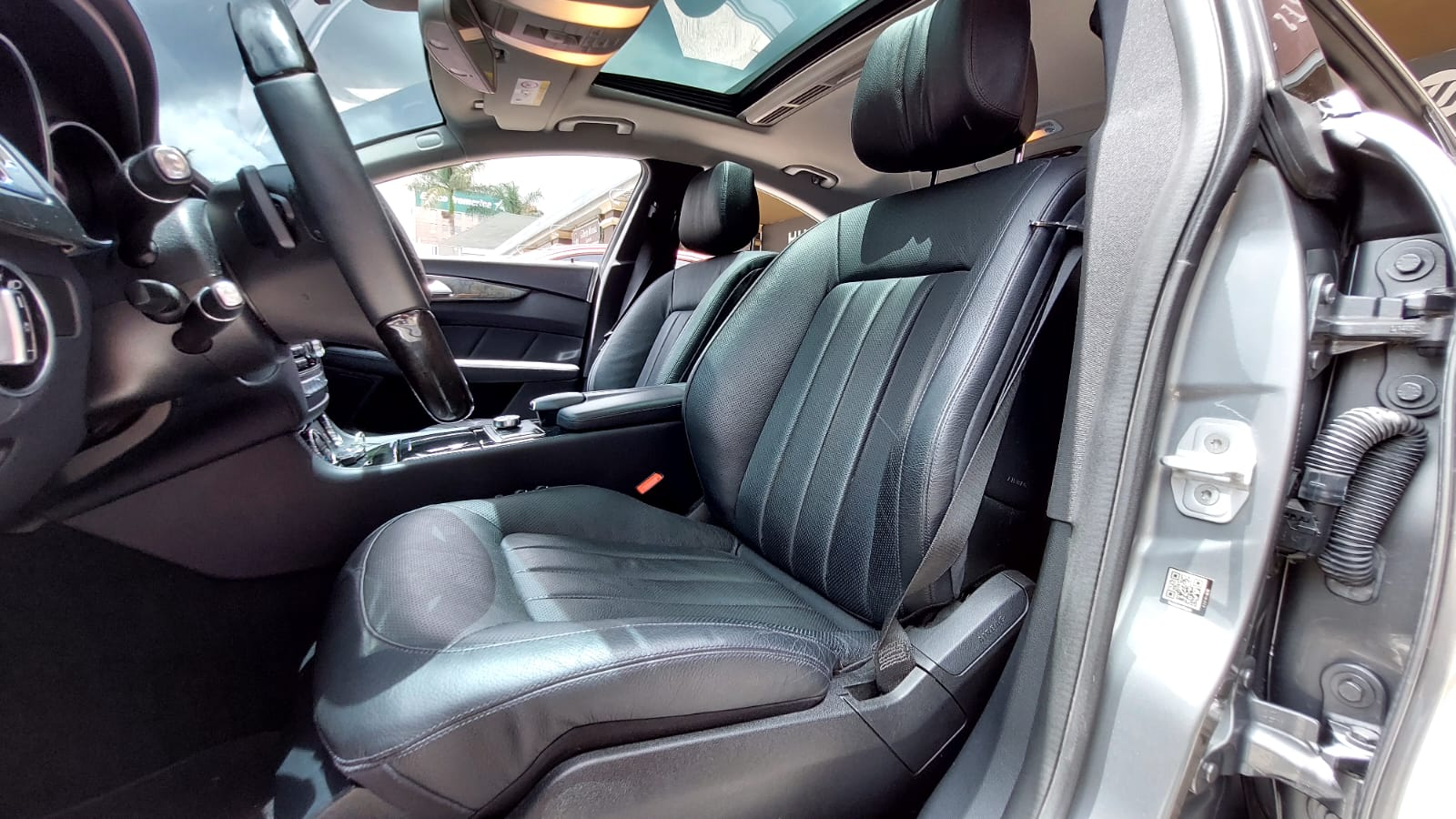
Interior CLS 2014

=== Sedan (C218) ===
Production started in January 2011, with 4MATIC model sales starting later in September.

=== Shooting Brake (X218) ===
The CLS Shooting Brake was announced in June 2012, and is an estate version of the CLS sedan. It is based on the Concept Shooting Brake unveiled at Auto China 2010. Shooting Brake models went on sale from October 2012, and are available alongside sedan models in all-wheel drive and AMG variants. It is currently not sold in the United States. It is the most expensive serial production station wagon in the world since year 1992.

== Equipment ==
Standard equipment includes bi-xenon headlights, 18-inch alloy wheels, dual zone automatic climate control, power sunroof, and satellite navigation with a 10GB hard-drive. Standard safety equipment consists of anti-lock brakes, electronic stability control, active head restraints, and 10 total front, side, and knee airbags. CLS models also come with driver fatigue detection and lane departure warning system functions as standard. Available options include Mercedes' AIRMATIC air suspension, traffic sign recognition, and a reversing camera in conjunction with the COMAND APS system.

== Models ==
=== Petrol engines ===
Model	Years	Engine	Power	Torque	0–100 km/h (0–62 mph)
CLS 300 (Note: Chinese market only)	02/2012–2018	M276 DE35; 3.5 L V6	185 kW (252 PS; 248 hp) at 6,500 rpm	340 N⋅m (251 lb⋅ft) at 3,500–4,500 rpm	7.0 s
CLS 350; BlueEFFICIENCY	01/2011–08/2014	M276 DE35; 3.5 L V6	225 kW (306 PS; 302 hp) at 6,500 rpm	370 N⋅m (273 lb⋅ft) at 3,500–5,250 rpm	6.1 s
CLS 400	2014-2017	M276 DE30 LA 3.0 L V6 twin-turbo	245 kW (333 PS; 329 hp) at 5,250–6,000 rpm	480 N⋅m (354 lb⋅ft) at 1,600–4,000 rpm	5.3 s
CLS 400	2014–2017	M276 DE35 AL; 3.5 L V6 twin-turbo	245 kW (333 PS; 329 hp) at 5,250–6,000 rpm	480 N⋅m (354 lb⋅ft) at 1,200–4,000 rpm	5.3 s
CLS 500; BlueEFFICIENCY	2011–2014	M278 DE46; 4.7 L V8 twin-turbo	300 kW (408 PS; 402 hp) at 5,000–5,750 rpm	600 N⋅m (443 lb⋅ft) at 1,600–4,750 rpm	5.2 s
CLS 500	2014–2017	M278 DE46; 4.7 L V8 twin-turbo	300 kW (408 PS; 402 hp) at 5,000–5,750 rpm	600 N⋅m (443 lb⋅ft) at 1,600–4,750 rpm	4.8 s
CLS 63 AMG (after 2013 also available with AWD)	2011–2013	M157 DE55; 5.5 L V8 twin-turbo	386 kW (525 PS; 518 hp) at 5,250–5,750 rpm	700 N⋅m (516 lb⋅ft) at 1,700–5,000 rpm	4.4 s
CLS 63 AMG (after 2013 also available with AWD)	2013–2018	M157 DE55; 5.5 L V8 twin-turbo	410 kW (557 PS; 550 hp) at 5,250–5,750 rpm	720 N⋅m (531 lb⋅ft) at 1,750–5,000 rpm	4.2 s
CLS 63 AMG; Performance Package	2011–2013	M157 DE55; 5.5 L V8 twin-turbo	410 kW (557 PS; 550 hp) at 5,750 rpm	800 N⋅m (590 lb⋅ft) at 2,000–4,500 rpm	4.3 s
CLS 63 AMG S 4MATIC	2013–2018	M157 DE55; 5.5 L V8 twin-turbo	430 kW (585 PS; 577 hp) at 5,500 rpm	800 N⋅m (590 lb⋅ft) at 2,000–4,500 rpm	3.6 s

=== Diesel engines ===
Model	Years	Engine	Power	Torque	0–100 km/h (0–62 mph)
CLS 220 BlueTEC*	2014–2017	OM651 DE22; 2.1 L twin-turbo I4	125 kW (170 PS; 168 hp) at 3,000–4,200 rpm	400 N⋅m (295 lb⋅ft) at 1,400–2,800 rpm	8.3 s
CLS 250 CDI; BlueEFFICIENCY	2011–2014	OM651 DE22; 2.1 L twin-turbo I4	150 kW (204 PS; 201 hp) at 4,200 rpm	500 N⋅m (369 lb⋅ft) at 1,600–1,800 rpm	7.5 s
CLS 250 BlueTEC*	2014–2017	OM651 DE22; 2.1 L twin-turbo I4	150 kW (204 PS; 201 hp) at 4,200 rpm	500 N⋅m (369 lb⋅ft) at 1,600–1,800 rpm	7.5 s
CLS 350 CDI; BlueEFFICIENCY	2011–2014	OM642 DE30; 3.0 L turbo V6	195 kW (265 PS; 261 hp) at 3,800 rpm	620 N⋅m (457 lb⋅ft) at 1,600–2,400 rpm	6.2 s
CLS 350 BlueTEC*	2014–2017	OM642 DE30; 3.0 L turbo V6	190 kW (258 PS; 255 hp) at 3,400 rpm	620 N⋅m (457 lb⋅ft) at 1,600–2,400 rpm	6.5 s

*The designation "d" replaces "BlueTEC" for the 2015 model year

== CLS 63 AMG ==
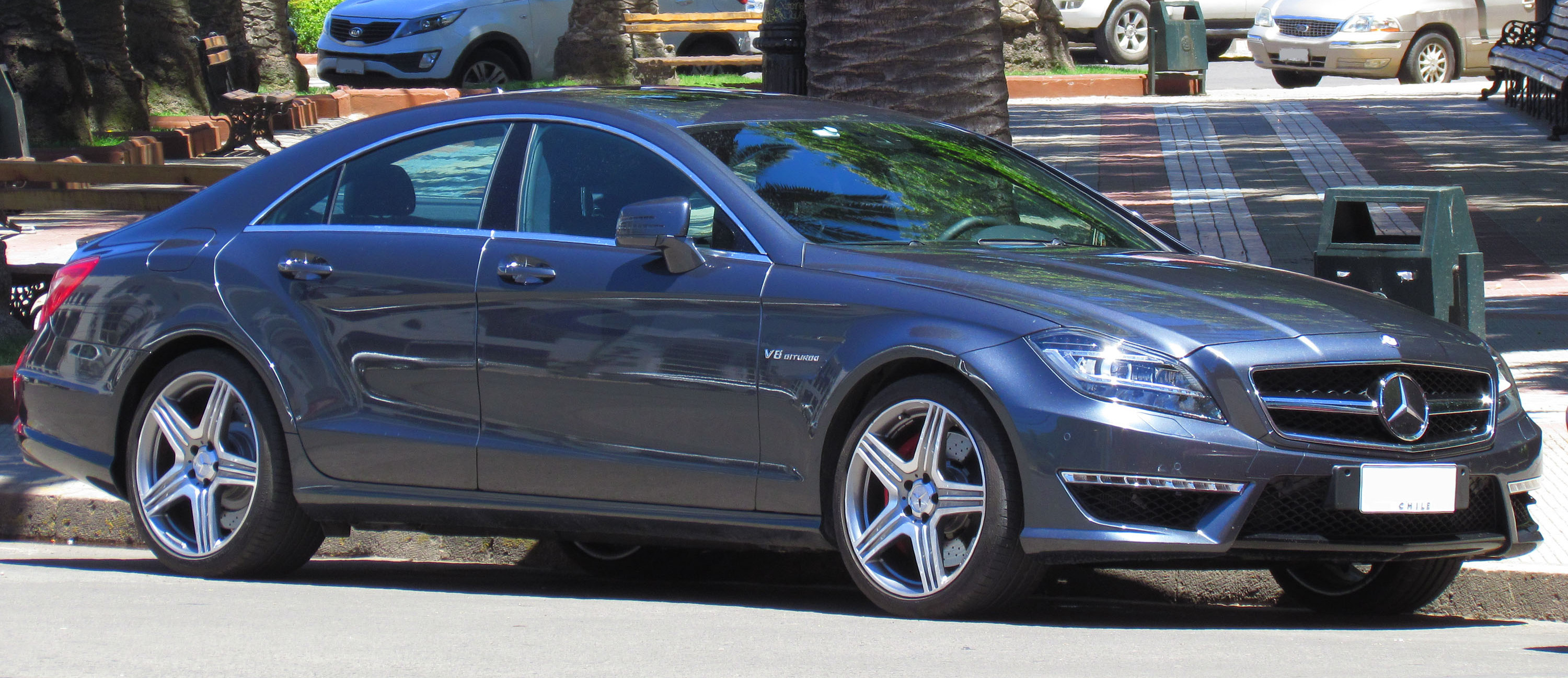
CLS 63 AMG sedan

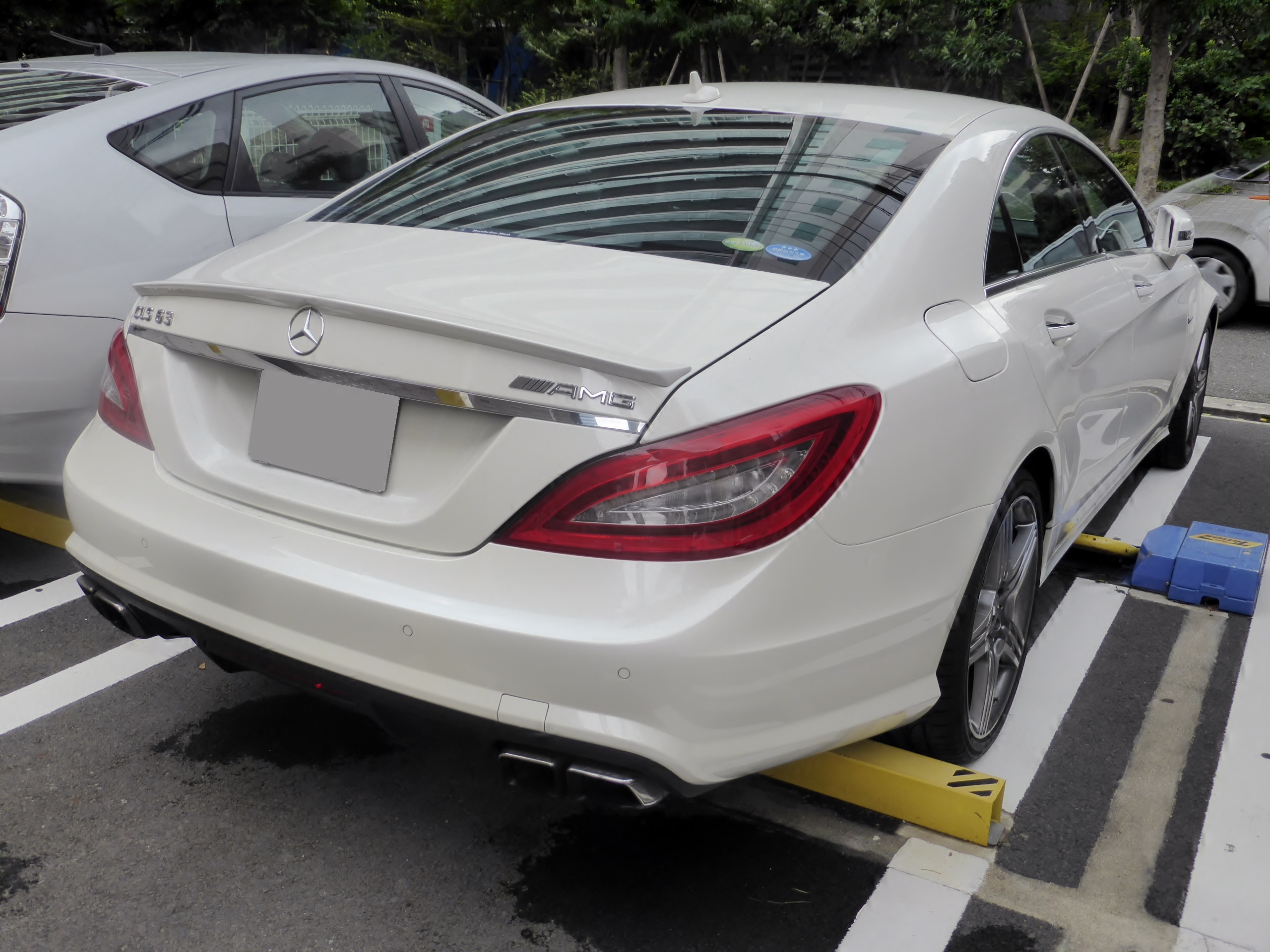
CLS 63 AMG sedan

The CLS 63 AMG is a high performance variant of the CLS and went on sale in March 2011. It features a 5.5 L bi-turbo V8 rated at 386 kW (518 hp) and 700 N⋅m (516 lb⋅ft). Standard equipment includes an AMG SpeedShift MCT 7-speed transmission, a 24 mm (1 in) wider front track, larger 360 mm ventilated and perforated brake discs, an AMG sports exhaust system, and a three-spoke AMG Performance steering wheel with shift paddles. The CLS 63 AMG is available in both sedan and Shooting Brake variants, as well as in rear-wheel drive or 4MATIC all-wheel drive configurations.

Edition 1 models were available exclusively in the first year of its market launch, and featured power increases of 24 kW (32 hp) and 100 N⋅m (74 lb⋅ft). Other additions include Edition 1 insignia, matte exterior paintwork, designo leather, and a choice of three AMG exclusive interior trim. An AMG Performance Package was also offered separately, and featured a carbon-fiber spoiler lip, red brake calipers, and increased performance gains of 24 kW (32 hp) and 100 N⋅m (74 lb⋅ft), resulting in a 0–60 mph (97 km/h) time of 4.1 seconds.

From April 2013, the CLS 63 AMG range was updated to now produce 410 kW (550 hp) and 720 N⋅m (531 lb⋅ft). The Performance Package was also replaced by the new CLS 63 AMG S model, featuring further performance and efficiency enhancements, all-wheel drive 4MATIC as standard, and a rear locking differential. It is also available as a Shooting Brake variant and launched in June 2013.

== Model year changes ==
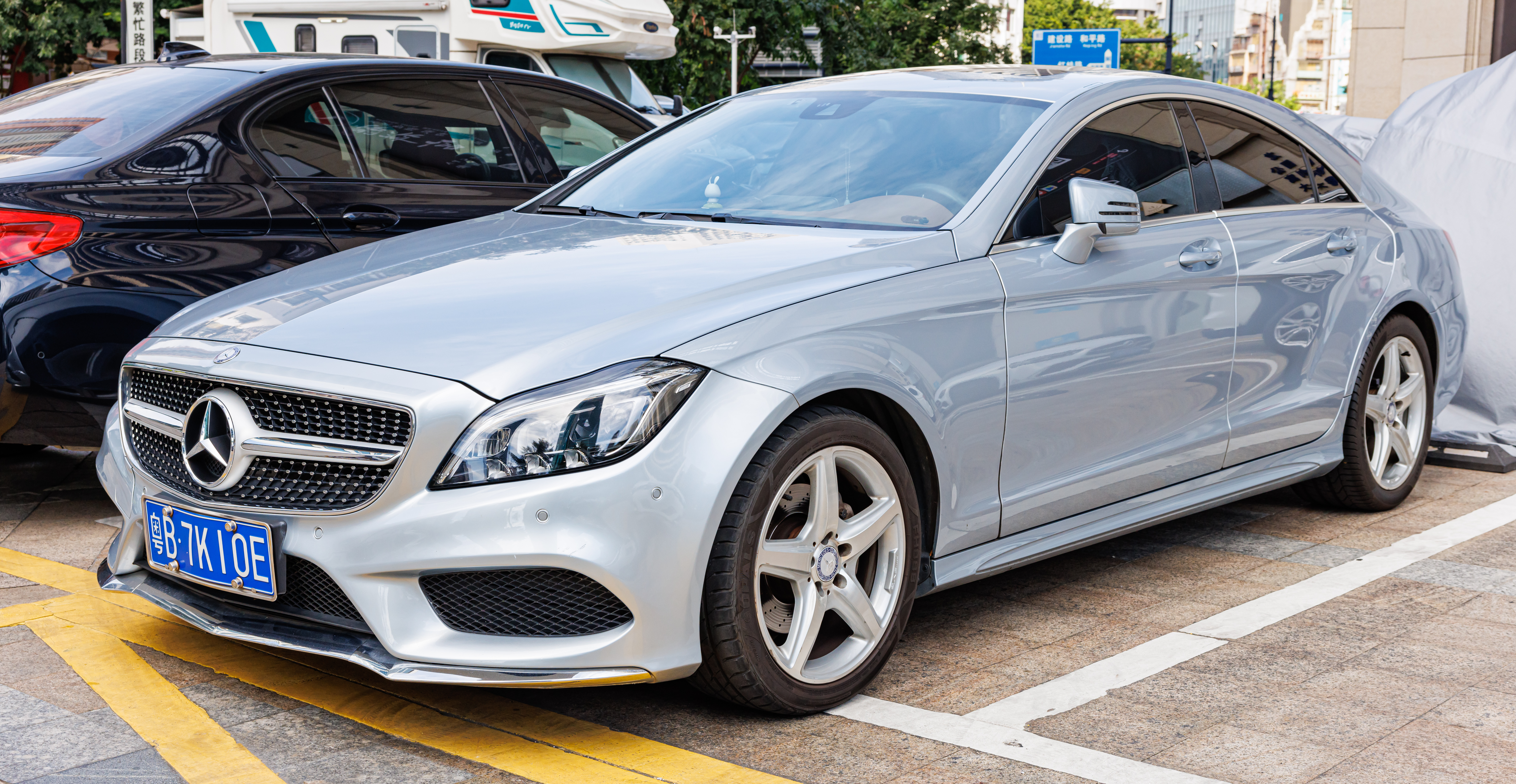

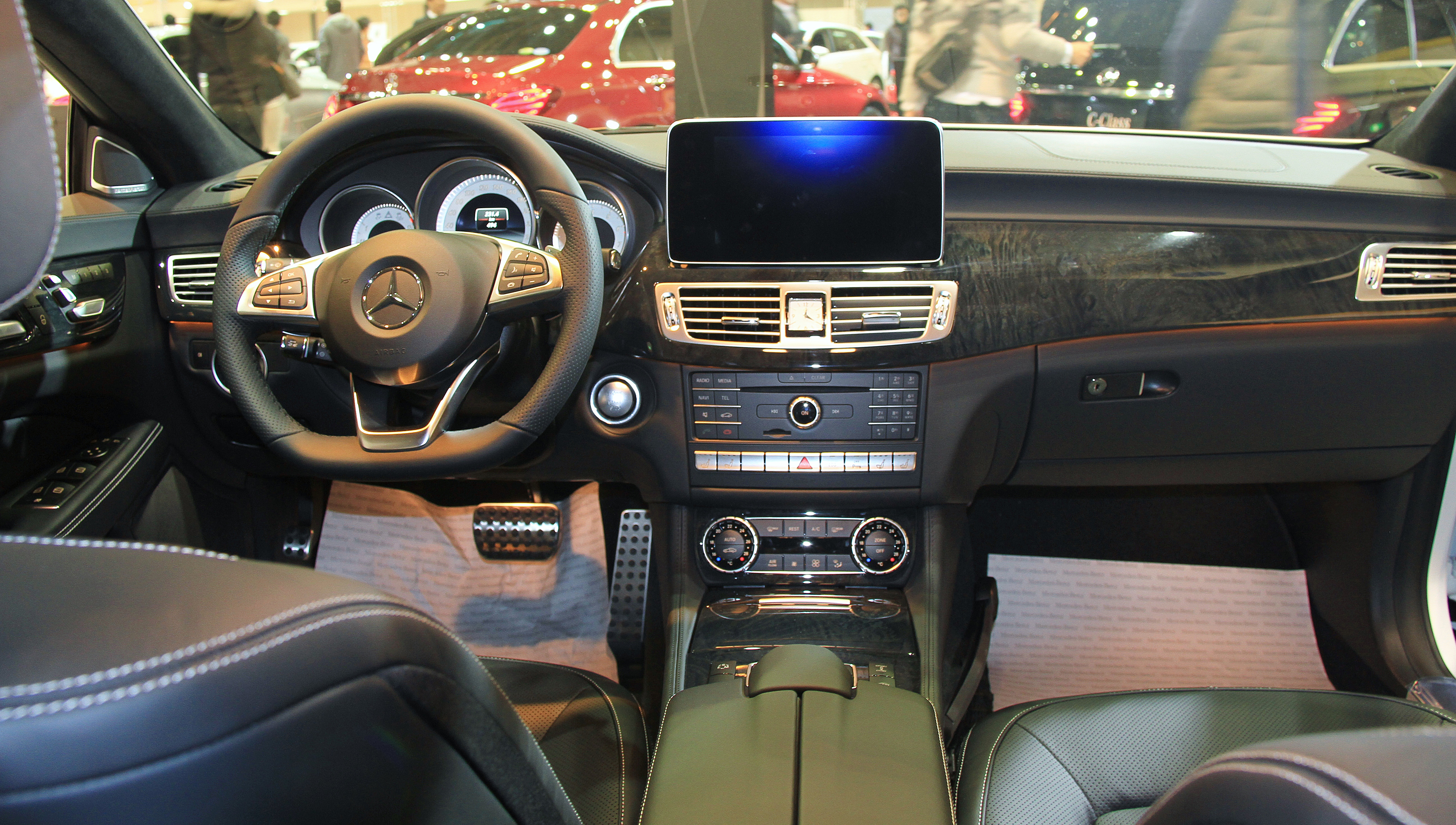
Facelift C218 CLS sedan

=== 2014 facelift ===
A facelift was introduced for the CLS model range in 2014 (for model year 2015).

The major changes are:

- A redesigned front fascia with a diamond-patterned radiator grille (for AMG package models) and new anti-dazzle MULTIBEAM LED headlights
- Tail lights in slightly darker shade of red
- Interior changes including a new steering wheel design and a larger free standing 8-inch COMAND APS display
- New model naming scheme for diesel engines (CLS 350 BlueTEC now called CLS 350d)
- Introduction of CLS 400 and CLS 220d models, and updated CLS 350d engine
- Introduction of 9G-TRONIC nine-speed automatic transmission on all models (excluding the CLS 400)

=== 2016 ===
- CLS 400 receives 9-speed automatic transmission

== Sales figures ==
As with the previous generation, the CLS sedan and Shooting Brake models are produced in Sindelfingen, Germany.

The following are the sales figures for the C218 CLS in Europe only:

Year	Total
2011	17,414
2012	12,797
2013	15,139
2014	10,289
2015	12,600
2016	7,803
2017	5,116
Total:	81,158

== Awards ==
- 2010 Auto Bild 'Golden Steering Wheel Award'
- 2010 Auto Zeitung 'Best Car of the Year' (luxury segment)
- 2011 auto motor und sport 'Autonis Awards'
- 2011 Automotive Brand Contest 'Best of Best' (exterior category)
- 2013 Auto Zeitung Design Award for the CLS Shooting Brake
- 2016 cars.com 'Luxury Car of the Year'
