= Mercedes-Benz SL-Class (R231) =

German luxury roadster (2012–2020)

Mercedes-Benz SL (R231)
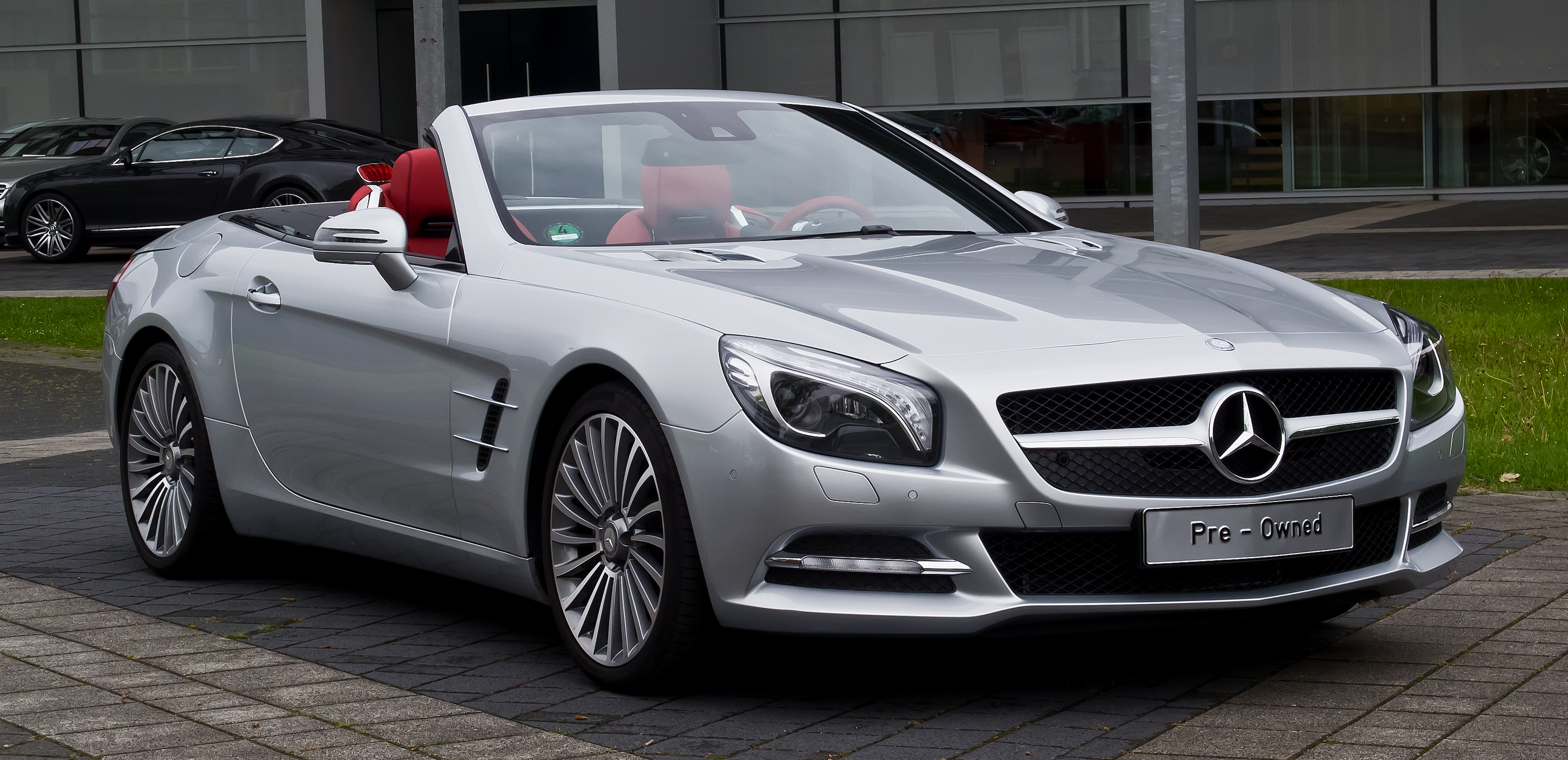

Overview
- Manufacturer: Daimler AG
- Production: March 2011–2020
- Model years: 2012–2020
- Assembly: Germany: Bremen
- Designer: Frank Pfisterer; Mark Fetherston (2007)

Body and chassis
- Class: Grand tourer (S)
- Body style: 2-door retractable hardtop
- Layout: Front-engine, rear-wheel-drive
- Related: Mercedes-Benz E-Class (W212)

Powertrain
- Engine: Petrol: 3.0 L M276 twin-turbo V6; 3.5 L M276 V6; 4.7 L M278 twin-turbo V8; 5.5 L M157 twin-turbo V8; 6.0 L M279 twin-turbo V12
- Transmission: 7-speed 7G-Tronic automatic 9-speed 9G-Tronic automatic

Dimensions
- Wheelbase: 2,585 mm (101.8 in)
- Length: 4,582 mm (180.4 in); AMG: 4,592 mm (180.8 in)
- Width: 1,877 mm (73.9 in)
- Height: 1,315 mm (51.8 in)
- Curb weight: 1,675–1,845 kg (3,693–4,068 lb)

Chronology
- Predecessor: Mercedes-Benz SL-Class (R230)
- Successor: Mercedes-Benz SL (R232)

R231 is a chassis code for the sixth generation of the Mercedes-Benz SL-Class roadster, replacing the R230. The car was released in March 2012 and uses Mercedes-Benz's new 4.7 litre twin turbo V8 engine with a power output of 435 PS (320 kW; 429 hp). AMG version of the roadster will follow. The new SL is 140 kg (309 lb) lighter than the previous, being made almost entirely out of aluminium. For the first time, the R231 SL-Class was not available with a non-AMG V12 engined SL 600 model.

== Design ==
The R231 is designed with an aluminium space-frame, 182 in (4,623 mm) in length by 83 in (2,108 mm) in width. (2 in (51 mm). wider/longer than previous generation). Engineers at Mercedes have also installed a new folding hardtop roof with a panoramic sunroof that will have as an option, variable tint. The design process began in 2007, with a final design by Frank Pfisterer and Mark Fetherston being chosen, delayed for over 2 years, and then approved for production in early 2010. Design patents were filed on 5 August 2009 using a CAD file and in German patents in April 2010 using a prototype. Changes from last generation include all-aluminium body, MAGIC VISION CONTROL windscreen wipe/wash system, FrontBass footwell bass loudspeakers, HANDS-FREE ACCESS boot lid opening system via foot movement around rear bumper.

== Equipment ==
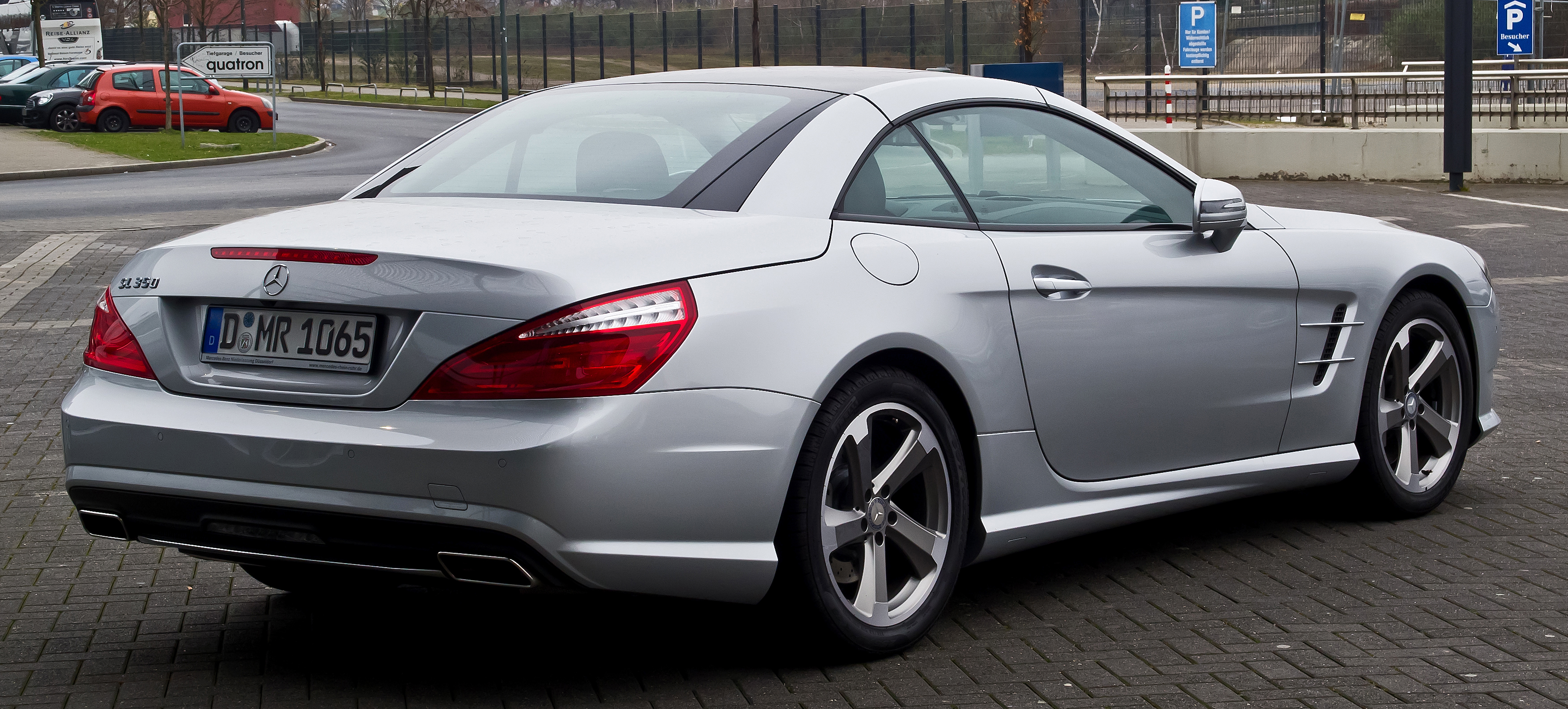
Mercedes-Benz SL 350 AMG Line (Germany; roof unretracted)

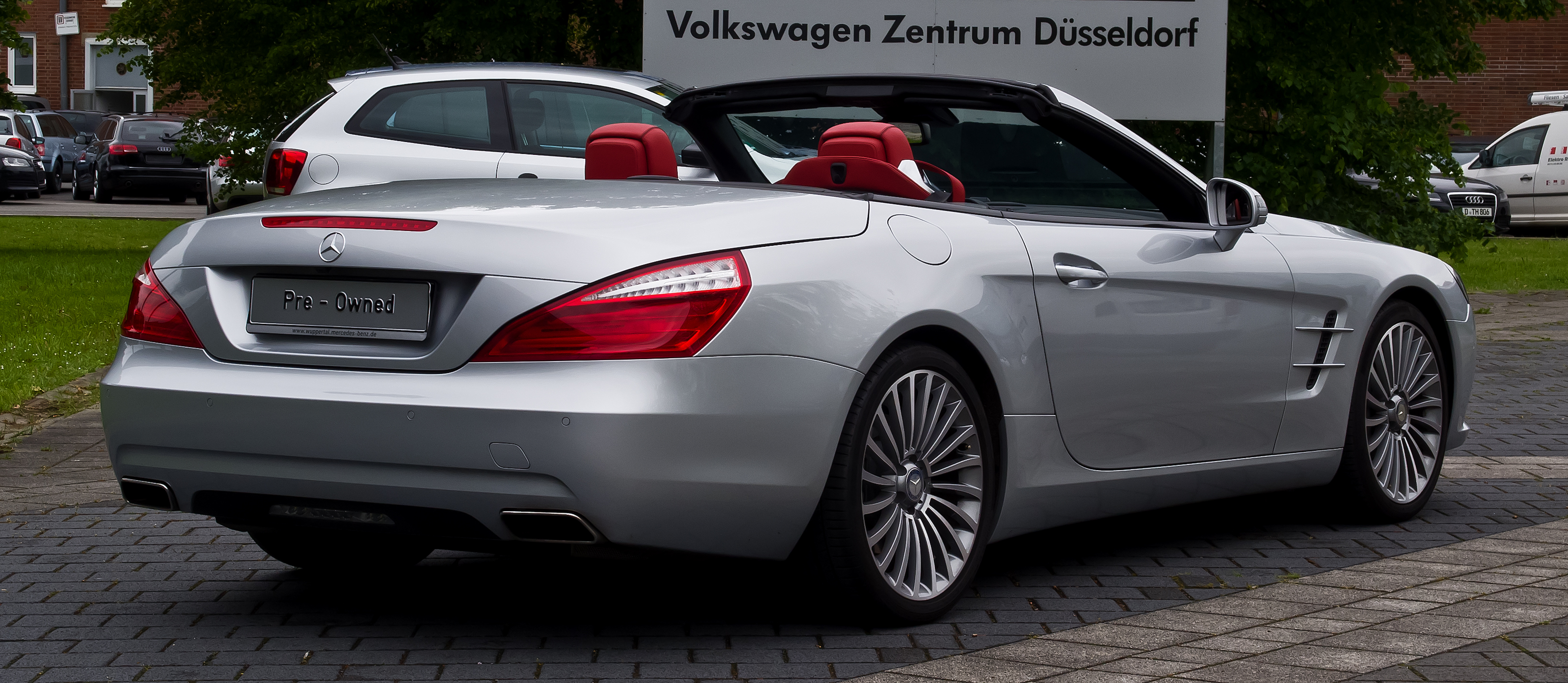
Mercedes-Benz SL 350 (Germany; roof retracted)

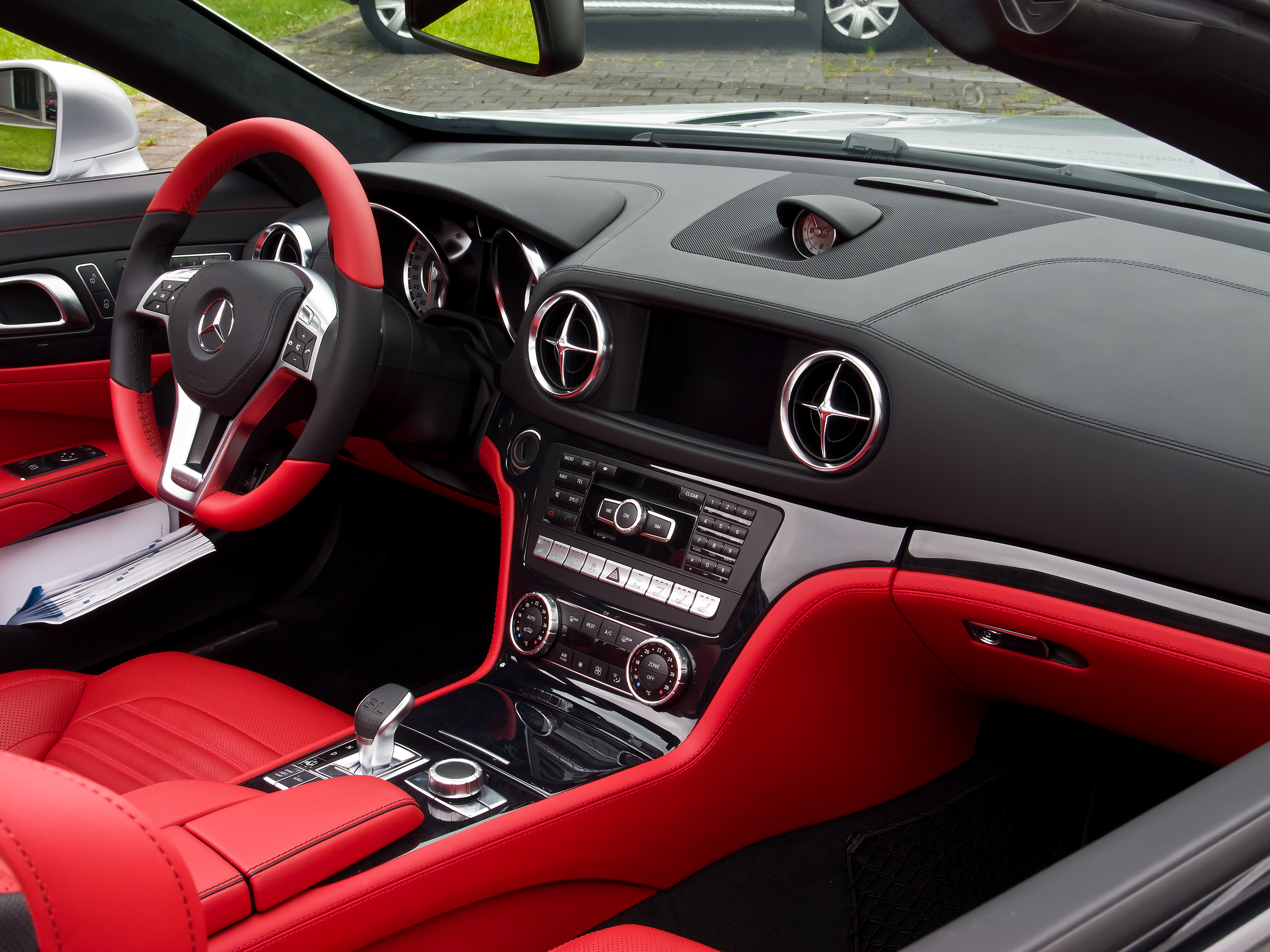
SL 350 interior

- Active Body Control fully active suspension (optional) or standard semi-active suspension with adaptive damping system
- Torque Vectoring Brake
- MAGIC VISION CONTROL wiper blades
- MAGIC SKY CONTROL glass roof with selectable transparency
- Traffic Sign Assist with Speed Limit Assist and wrong-way driving warning function
- COLLISION PREVENTION ASSIST (as standard)
- ATTENTION ASSIST (as standard)
- ADAPTIVE BRAKE (as standard)
- DISTRONIC PLUS
- Brake Assist system BAS PLUS
- NECK-PRO crash-responsive head restraints
- PRE-SAFE, PRE-SAFE Brake, PRE-SAFE PLUS
- Active bonnet
- Active Lane Keeping Assist
- Full-LED headlamps with Intelligent Light System and Adaptive Highbeam Assist PLUS
- Night View Assist PLUS
- Active Parking Assist
- Active Blind Spot Assist
- Backup camera
- Electric parking brake with emergency braking function
- Direct-Steer Electromechanical steering with Steer Assist electromechanical steering power assistance

== Models ==
=== SL Edition 1 (2012) ===
At the launch of the new SL, Mercedes offered a limited production 'Edition 1' version with an exclusive designo crystal silver magno body colour, panoramic vario-roof, AMG bodystyling, sports suspension, AMG 19-inch light-alloy wheels, designo Nappa leather with contrasting topstitching, AIRSCARF, heated seats, electric draft-stop, ambient lighting, Harman/Kardon Logic7 surround sound system, and trim in either black piano lacquer or deep white aluminium.

The vehicle was unveiled at the 2012 North American International Auto Show, followed by the 2012 Geneva Motor Show.

The vehicle was available from Mercedes-Benz sales partners from 31 March 2012. Early models include the SL 350 BlueEFFICIENCY and SL 500.

=== SL 63 AMG (2012–2019) ===
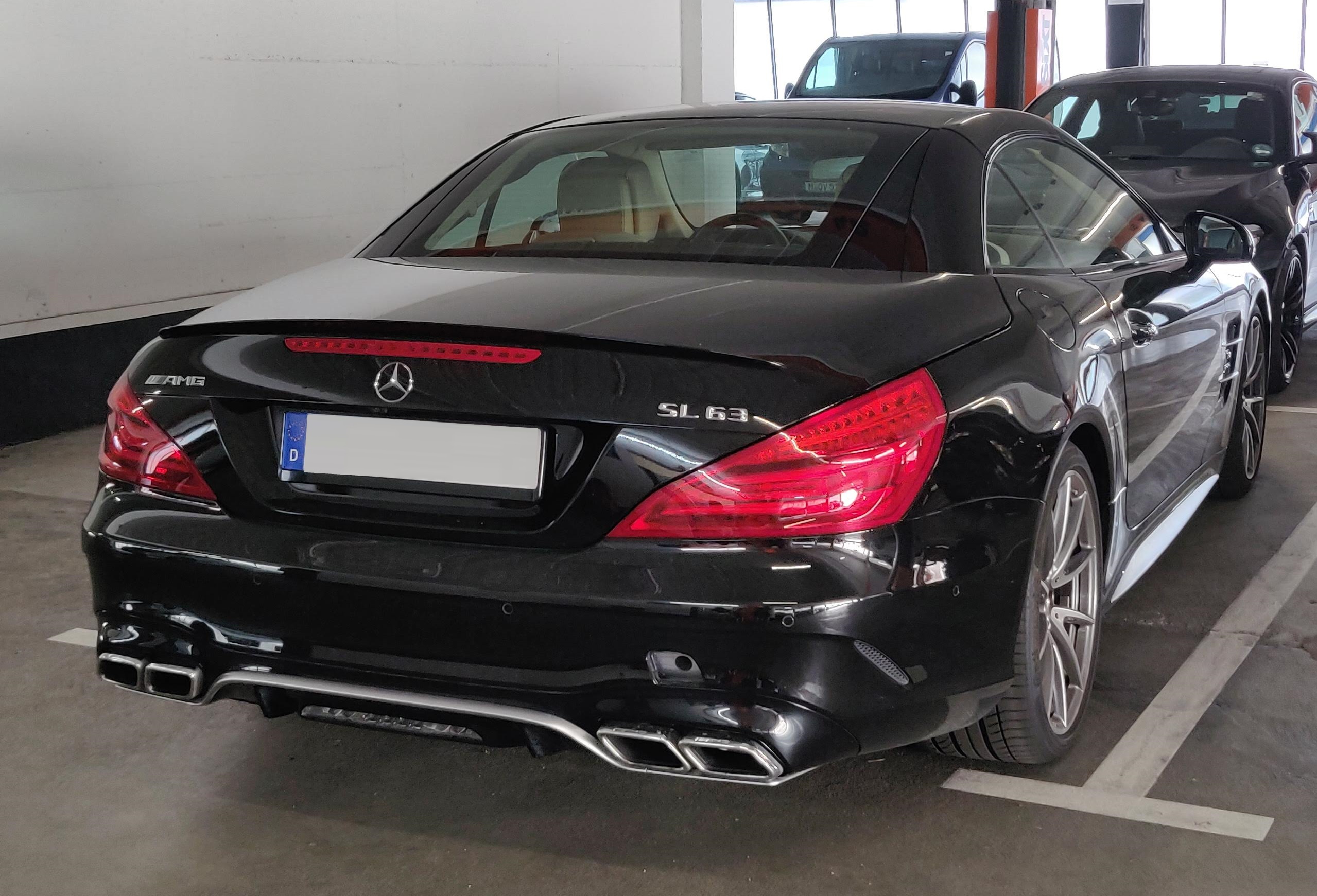
Mercedes-Benz SL 63 AMG (facelifted) in Germany

The SL 63 AMG is powered by a 5.5-litre V8 'biturbo' (twin-turbocharged) engine rated at 537 PS (395 kW; 530 hp) at 5500 rpm and 800 N⋅m (590 lb⋅ft) at 2000–4500 rpm, paired with an AMG SpeedshiftT MCT 7-speed automatic transmission. It also features AMG sports suspension, five-twin-spoke AMG light-alloy wheels in titanium grey with a high-sheen finish with 255/35 R 19 front and 285/30 R 19 rear tyres, front apron with large air dams, AMG-specific LED daytime running lamps and a lower cross strut in silver chrome, AMG radiator grille with a double louvre in silver chrome, optional Vario-roof, AMG sports seats in single-tone or two-tone Nappa leather with a unique V8 seat upholstery layout and AMG badges in the seat backrests, a multicontour function and seat heating; AMG carbon-fibre trim, AMG illuminated door sill panels, ambient lighting and an IWC-design analogue clock.

The AMG Performance Package includes increased engine power to 564 PS (415 kW; 556 hp) at 5500 rpm and 900 N⋅m (664 lb⋅ft) at 2250–3750 rpm, raised top speed to 300 km/h (186 mph), carbon fibre AMG engine cover and AMG spoiler lip, AMG rear axle differential lock, red-painted callipers and an AMG performance steering wheel in Nappa leather.

The Edition 1 model of the SL 63 includes AIRSCARF neck-level heating, AMG forged light-alloy wheels (painted matt black, rim flange with a high-sheen finish), AMG Performance package, designo Exclusive leather in classic red or deep white with contrasting topstitching, designo headliner in black leather, Harman/Kardon Logic 7 surround sound system, MAGIC SKY CONTROL panoramic vario-roof.

The European model went on sale in May 2012 for €157,675, €189,269.50 for Edition 1 car, €14,280 for AMG Performance package (incl. 19% VAT).

The vehicle was unveiled at the 2012 Geneva Motor Show.

=== SL 65 AMG (2012–2018) ===
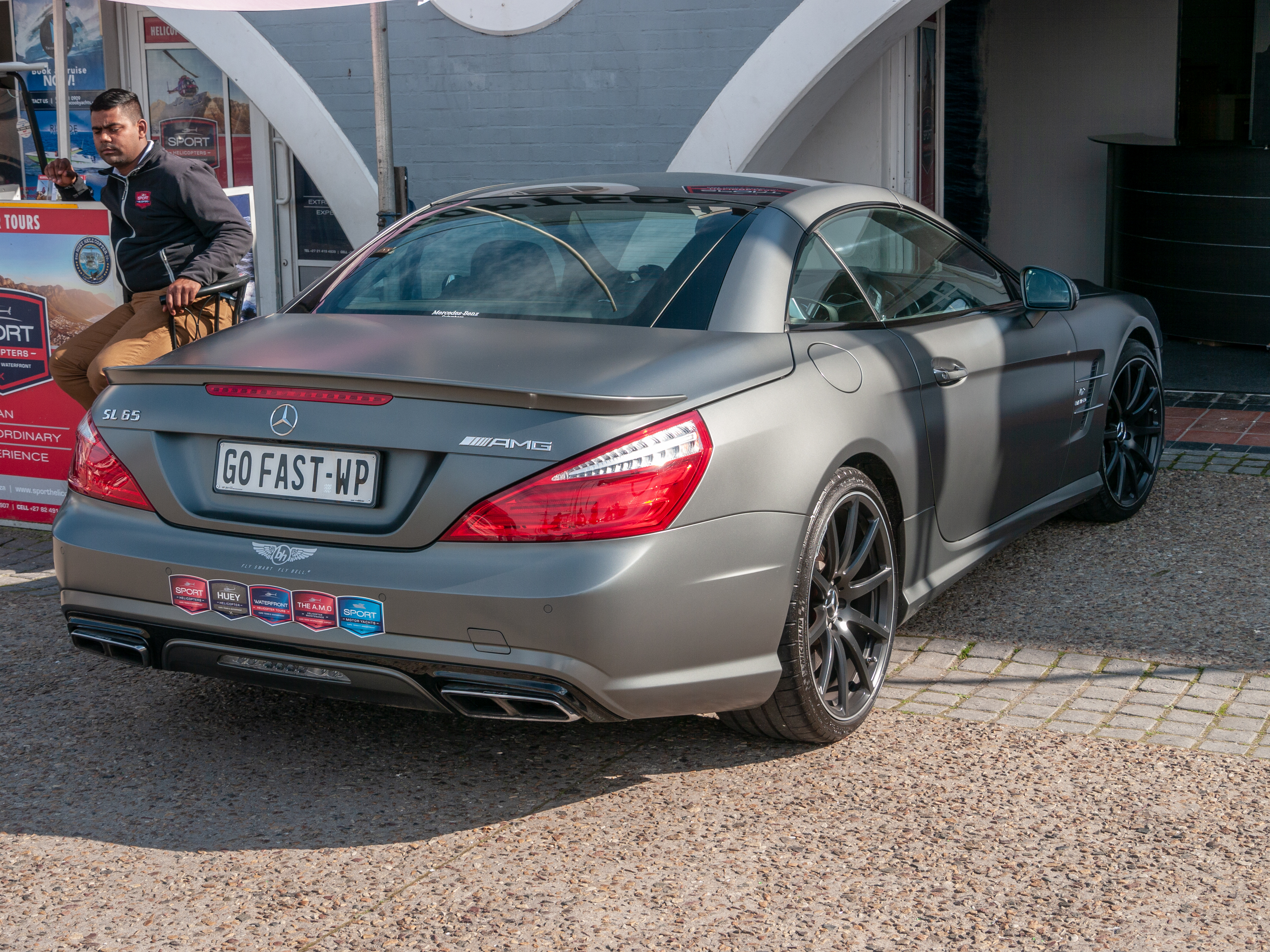
Mercedes-Benz SL 65 AMG in Cape Town, South Africa

The SL 65 AMG is powered by a bi-turbo V12 engine rated at 630 PS (463 kW; 621 hp) at 4800–5400 rpm and 1,000 N⋅m (738 lbf⋅ft) at 2300–4300 rpm, paired with an AMG Speedshift Plus 7G-TRONIC automatic transmission. It also features AMG five-spoke light-alloy wheels in titanium grey with a high-sheen finish with 255/35 R 19 front and 285/30 R 19 rear tyres (optional matt black with a high-sheen rim flange wheels), optional MAGIC SKY CONTROL Vario-roof, AMG sports seats with single or two-tone upholstery in Exclusive Nappa leather with a special AMG diamond pattern, AMG carbon-fibre trim elements, the IWC-design analogue clock, the chromed AMG door sill panels illuminated in white, the AMG Performance steering wheel, 360 km/h (224 mph) speedometer, and an AMG start-up display with an exclusive AMG V12 BITURBO animation.

The vehicle was unveiled at the 2012 New York International Auto Show.

The German model went on sale in September 2012 for €236,334 (incl. 19% VAT). The Japanese market model went on sale on 29 August 2012.

=== SL 65 AMG "45th Anniversary" (2012) ===
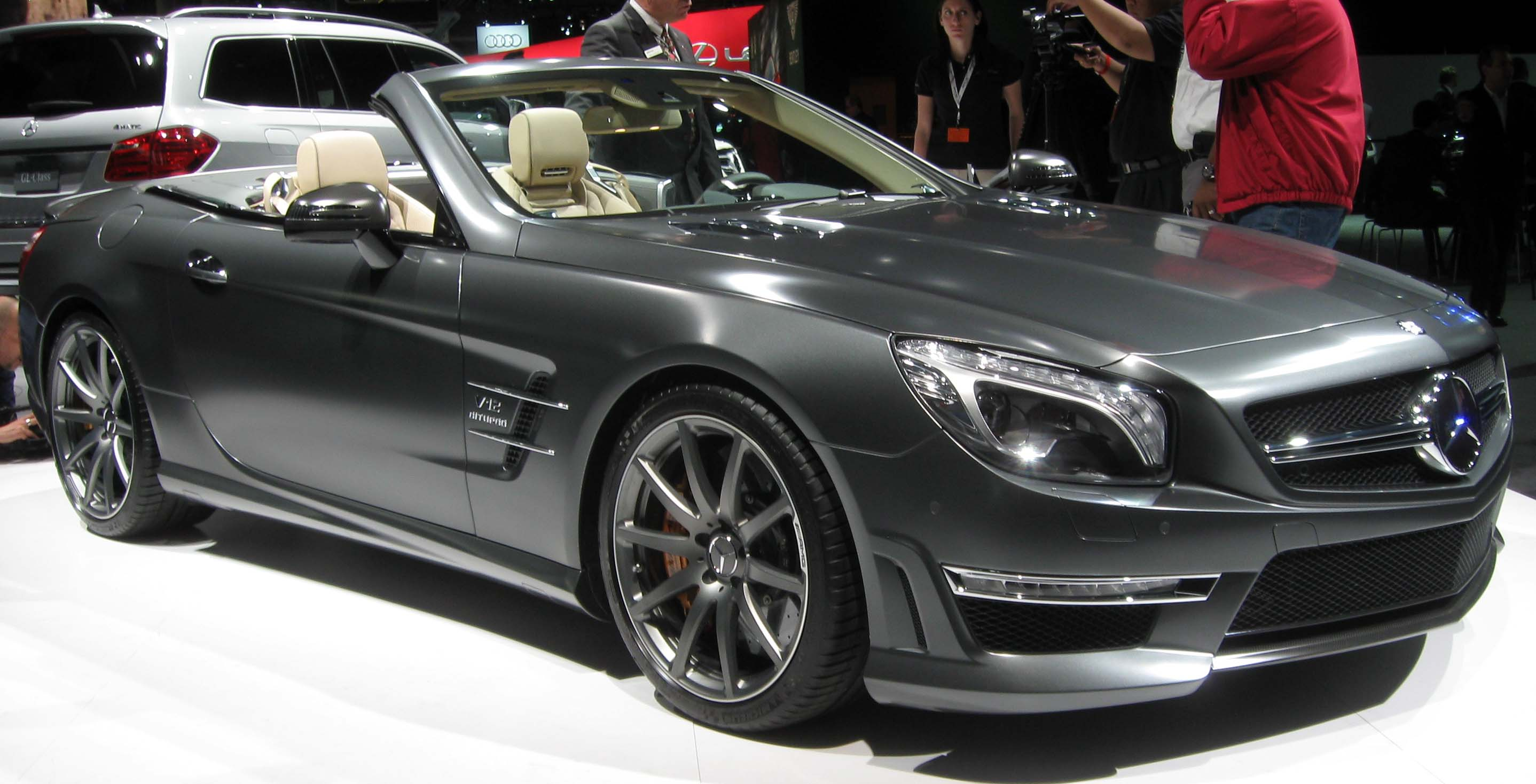
2013 Mercedes-Benz SL65 AMG Anniversary Edition

It is a limited (45 units, 5 in Japan) version of the SL 65 AMG commemorating the 45th anniversary of the AMG brand. It included designo magno graphite (grey) body colour, "twin-blade" radiator grille with blade-like slats, the surround for the AMG-specific LED daytime driving lights, fins on the wings and the hood, Exterior Carbon-Fibre package, AMG sports exhaust system (black with chrome plating twin tailpipe, high-gloss chrome inner insert), AMG Performance Studio multi-spoke forged wheels painted in titanium grey with high-sheen rim flange and matt finish, 255/35 R 19 front and 285/30 R 20 rear tires, designo Exclusive STYLE leather upholstery in grey pearl/ginger beige, AMG Performance steering wheel, matt carbon fibre interior trim.

The vehicle went on sale in September 2012.

Japan models went on sale on 2012-08-29.

=== Facelift (2017) ===
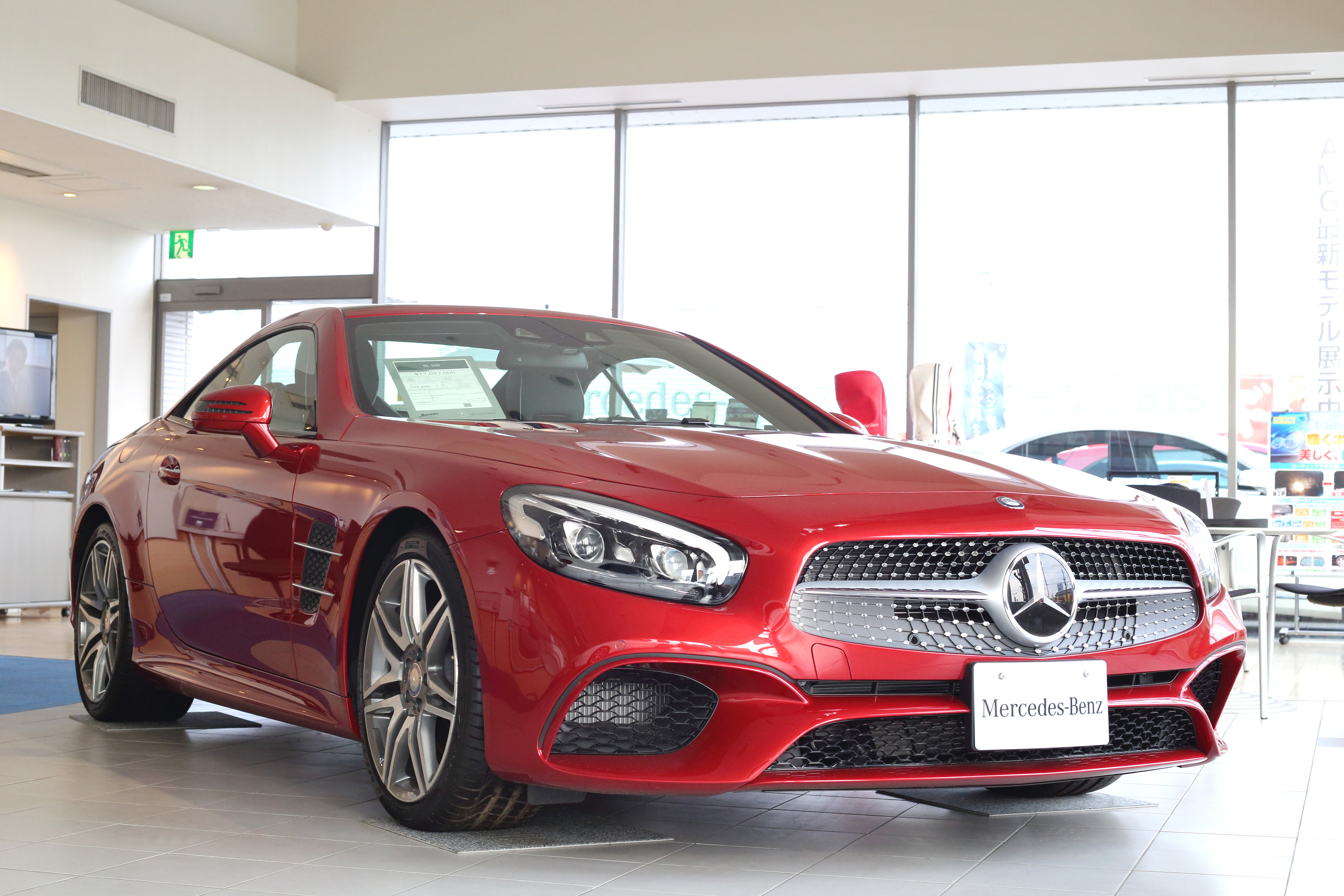
SL 550 JDM version

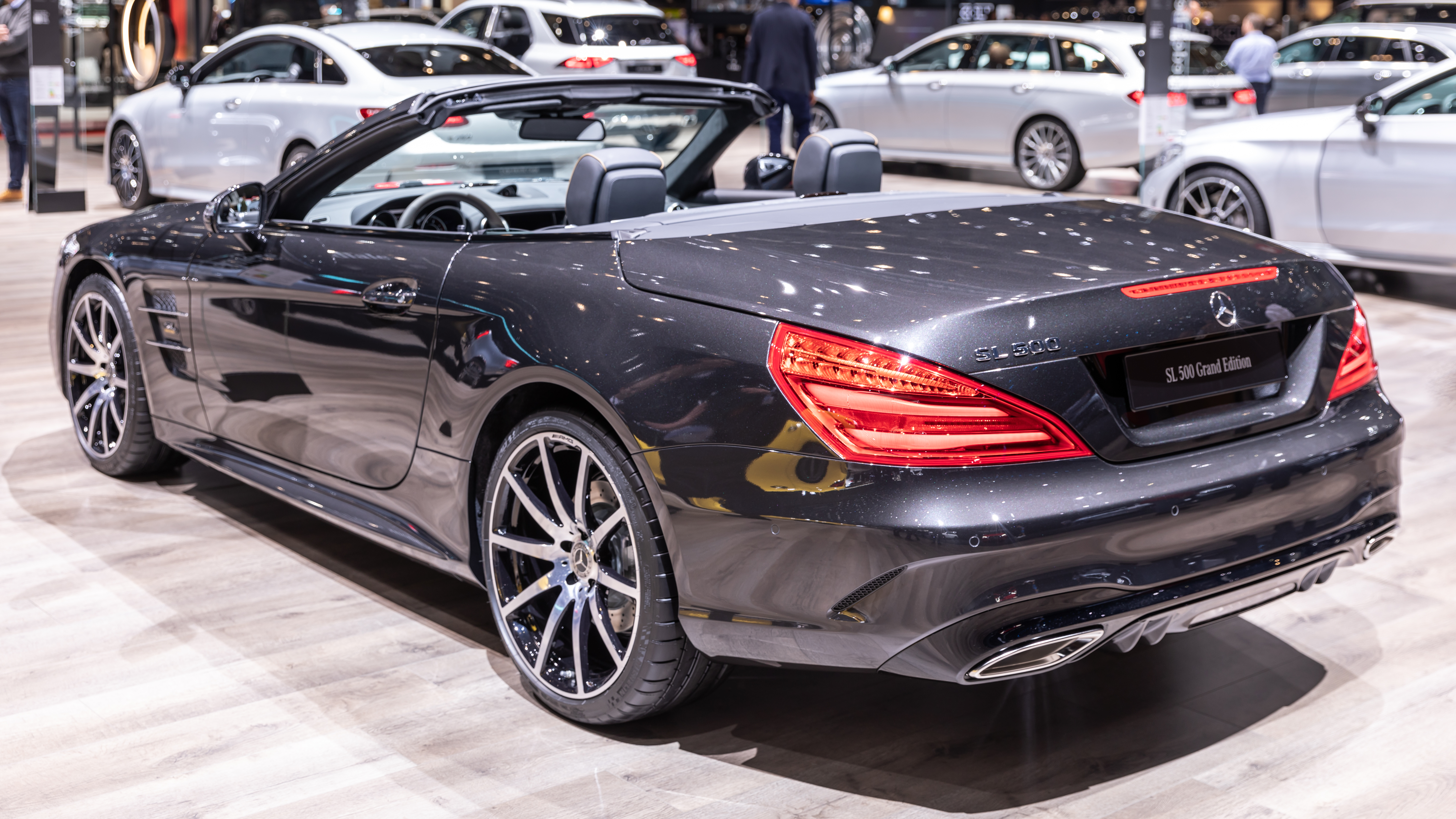
SL 500 Grand Edition (2019)

A mid-cycle facelift was introduced in 2016 for the 2017 model year. Launched early 2016 in California, the revised SL 400 (renamed SL 450 in the US) featured a 3-litre 362 hp (270 kW; 367 PS) biturbo V6 mated, for the first time in the SL, to Mercedes' own 9G-Tronic PLUS 9-speed automatic transmission.

An SL 500 (US SL 550), with a 4.7 litre biturbo V8 producing 449 hp (335 kW; 455 PS), was likewise paired with the 9G-tronic PLUS transmission. The Mercedes-AMG SL 63 (577 hp (430 kW; 585 PS)) and SL 65 (621 hp (463 kW; 630 PS)) variants continued with virtually unchanged powertrains, paired with AMG's SPEEDSHIFT MCT 7-speed sports transmission with claimed improved shift times.

Cosmetically, every SL received a revised front end, front grille treatment and larger non-functional side 'vents' behind the front wheels. All variants also received adaptive LED front headlights with integrated daytime running lights and turn signals, leaving the below bumper intake area free from lighting. The LED tail lights received single colour red or red and amber lenses instead of the red and white of the pre-facelift models.

Front and rear bumper assemblies were redesigned to align more closely with recent models introduced by Mercedes, while selected convenience and driver assistance technologies, introduced earlier on various other Mercedes models, were made optionally available, including revised Active Body Control (ABC), now with the "Curve Tilting" function from the S-Class Coupe. Externally, the SL 63 and SL 65 were distinguishable from the non-AMG variants by embellishments to their bumper assemblies and side sills in gloss black or polished aluminium, respectively. The SL 63 and SL 65 also featured trademark AMG 'twin lamella' front grilles and dual twin tailpipe exhaust trims as well as a carbon fibre composite trunk lid.

A slight revision to the folding 'Vario-roof' hardtop operation meant it would continue to deploy at speeds up to 25 mph (40 km/h) once initiated and the luggage compartment partition, required to prevent the hardtop components, when folded, and any luggage compartment contents coming into contact with each other, no longer had to be deployed in a separate manual operation.

Interiors continued virtually unchanged for MY2017 with the exception of slightly revised minor switchgear and a redesigned steering wheel.

== Engines and transmissions ==
Model	Years	Type/code	Power at rpm, Torque at rpm	Transmission
SL 350	2012–2014	3,498 cc (213.5 cu in) V6 (M 276 DE 35)	306 PS (225 kW; 302 hp) at 6,500, 370 N⋅m (273 lbf⋅ft) at 3,500-5,250	7-speed automatic (7G-Tronic Plus)
SL 400	2014–2020	2,996 cc (182.8 cu in) V6 BiTurbo (M 276 DE 30 LA)	333 PS (245 kW; 328 hp) at 5,250-6,000, 480 N⋅m (354 lbf⋅ft) at 1,600-4,000	7-speed automatic (7G-Tronic Plus)
SL 450	2017–2020	2,996 cc (182.8 cu in) V6 BiTurbo (M 276 DE 30 LA)	367 PS (270 kW; 362 hp) at 5,250-6,000, 500 N⋅m (369 lbf⋅ft) at 1,600-4,000	9-speed automatic (9G-Tronic Plus)
SL 500 (SL550)	2012–2015	4,663 cc (284.6 cu in) V8 BiTurbo (M 278 DE 46 AL)	435 PS (320 kW; 429 hp) at 5,250, 700 N⋅m (516 lbf⋅ft) at 1,800-3,500	7-speed automatic (7G-Tronic Plus)
SL 500 (SL550)	2016–2020	4,663 cc (284.6 cu in) V8 BiTurbo (M 278 DE 46 AL)	455 PS (335 kW; 449 hp) at 5,250, 700 N⋅m (516 lbf⋅ft) at 1,800-3,500	9-speed automatic (9G-Tronic Plus)
SL 63 AMG	2012–2014	5,461 cc (333.3 cu in) V8 BiTurbo (M 157 DE 55 AL)	537 PS (395 kW; 530 hp) at 5,500, 800 N⋅m (590 lbf⋅ft) at 2,000–4,500 AMG Performance Package: 564 PS (415 kW; 556 hp) at 5,500, 900 N⋅m (664 lbf⋅ft) at 2,250–3,750	7-speed (AMG SPEEDSHIFT MCT)
SL 63 AMG	2014–2018	5,461 cc (333.3 cu in) V8 BiTurbo (M 157 DE 55 AL)	585 PS (430 kW; 577 hp) at 5,500, 900 N⋅m (664 lbf⋅ft) at 2,250–3,750	7-speed (AMG SPEEDSHIFT MCT)
SL 63 AMG	2018–2019	5,461 cc (333.3 cu in) V8 BiTurbo (M 157 DE 55 AL)	571 PS (420 kW; 563 hp) at 5,500 900 N⋅m (664 lbf⋅ft) at 2,250–3,750	7-speed (AMG SPEEDSHIFT MCT)
SL 65 AMG	2012–2018	5,980 cc (365 cu in) V12 BiTurbo (M 279 E 60 AL)	630 PS (463 kW; 621 hp) at 4,800–5,400, 1,000 N⋅m (738 lbf⋅ft) at 2,300–4,300 (limited)	7-speed automatic (AMG SPEEDSHIFT PLUS 7G-TRONIC)

The SL 500 is badged as SL 550 in U.S., Canada, and Japan.

The SL 63 AMG was discontinued from 2019 onwards due to poor sales.
