= Mercedes-Benz M276 engine =

Mercedes-Benz M276 DE35
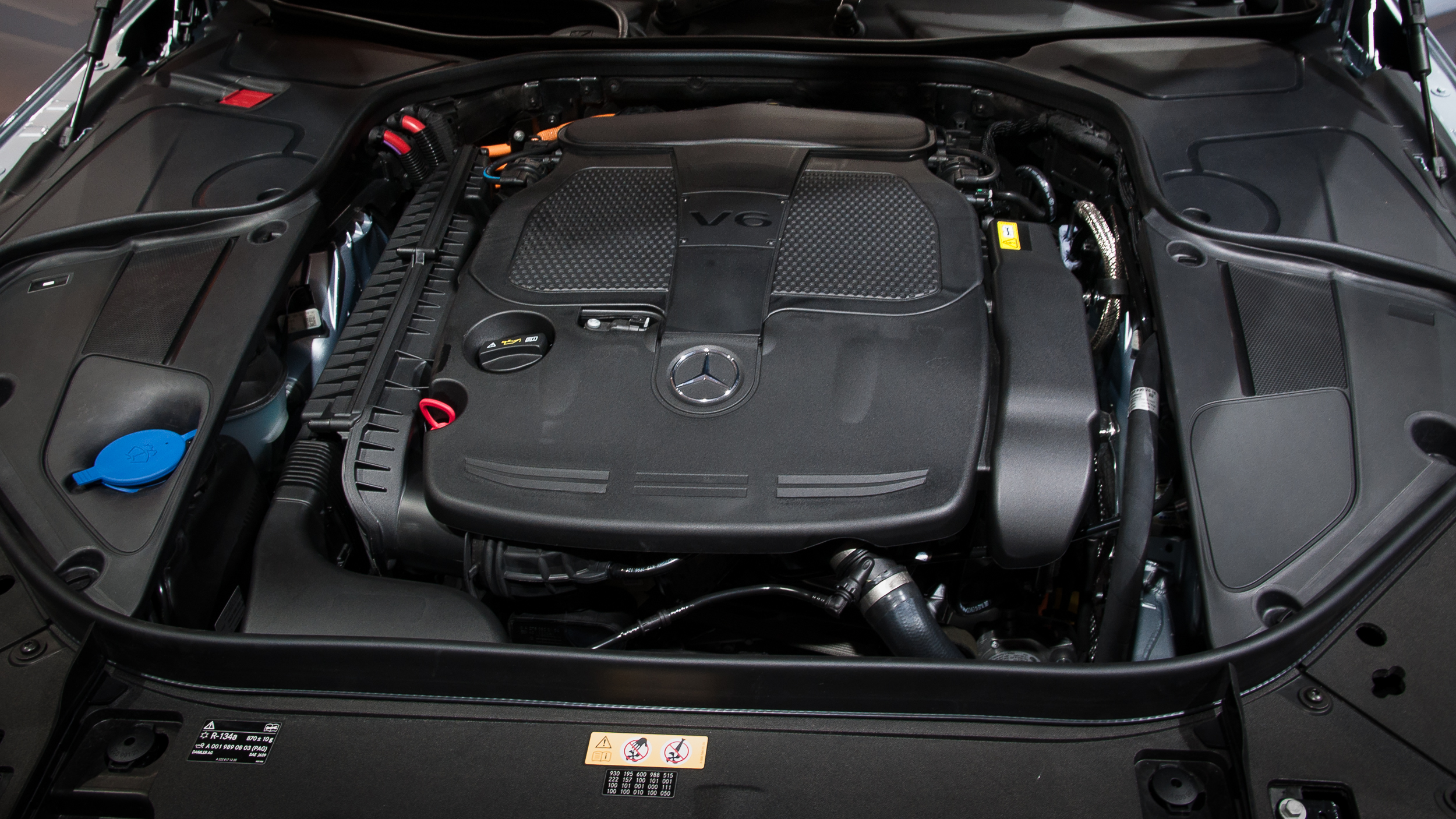

Overview
- Manufacturer: Mercedes-Benz
- Production: 2010–2018

Layout
- Configuration: Naturally aspirated 60° V6
- Displacement: 3.5 L (3,498 cc)
- Cylinder bore: 92.9 mm (3.66 in)
- Piston stroke: 86 mm (3.39 in)
- Cylinder block material: Aluminum
- Cylinder head material: Aluminum
- Valvetrain: DOHC with VVT

Combustion
- Fuel system: Direct injected
- Fuel type: Gasoline
- Oil system: Wet sump
- Cooling system: Water cooled

Output
- Power output: 248–302 hp (185–225 kW; 251–306 PS)
- Torque output: 340–370 N⋅m (251–273 lb⋅ft)

Chronology
- Predecessor: Mercedes-Benz M272
- Successor: M276 DE30LA

Mercedes-Benz M276 DE30LA

Overview
- Manufacturer: Daimler AG
- Production: 2013-2023

Layout
- Configuration: Turbocharged 60° V6
- Displacement: 3.0 L (2,996 cc)
- Cylinder bore: 88 mm (3.46 in)
- Piston stroke: 82.1 mm (3.23 in)
- Cylinder block material: Aluminum
- Cylinder head material: Aluminum
- Valvetrain: DOHC with VVT

Combustion
- Turbocharger: Twin-turbo
- Fuel system: Direct injected
- Fuel type: Gasoline

Output
- Power output: 328–385 hp (245–287 kW; 333–390 PS)(DELA30-DE30AL)
- Torque output: 480–521 N⋅m (354–384 lb⋅ft)(DELA30-DE30AL)

Chronology
- Predecessor: M276 DE35
- Successor: M276 DELA35 (DE35AL); M256

The Mercedes-Benz M276 engine is a gasoline direct injection automotive piston V6 engine.

The M276 engine is not related to the Chrysler Pentastar engine except for the 60-degree angle, despite that it was developed while Chrysler was still owned by Daimler AG. This can be seen in its 60 degree vee–angle, as opposed to the 90-degree angle of its M272 predecessor. The 60 degree vee–angle eliminates the need for a balance shaft, improving refinement while reducing mechanical complexity. None of the parts are shared at all.

The M276 engine features an aluminum engine block with Nanoslide cylinder coating and dual overhead camshafts with independent variable valve timing on 12 intake and 12 exhaust valves and a new 2–stage timing chain arrangement. The M276 also includes direct injection with piezo–electrically controlled injectors for 2 to 3 sprays per intake stroke in normal operation, multi–spark ignition that creates up to 4 sparks per cycle, and the demand–controlled fuel pump, water pump, oil pump and alternator that reduce parasitic loads.

The first spray of fuel injection creates the base lean burn mixture in the intake cycle, while the later spray(s), up to 4 more times in combustion cycle in difficult conditions for a clean burn, control when and where the ignition starts and how the burn propagates in stratified charge fashion. In combination with a new smaller and more efficient Variable Valve Timing mechanism on all 4 camshafts, the precise combustion control allows a quicker and smoother re–start of the engine for the stop–start system. This VVT can alter cam timing up to 40 crank degrees with a higher speed than before, and enables limiting the intake charge combined with a normal combustion stroke, thus making the operating process an Atkinson cycle in partial throttle conditions for better fuel efficiency. These features are also shared with Mercedes' M278 V8 engine, announced at the same time.

Mercedes–Benz claims that the new engine, in conjunction with the demand–controlled ancillaries and the stop–start system, can produce up to a 24% improvement in fuel economy while increasing power and torque over the M272. This efficiency improvement led to the various models with this engine being labeled with Blue Efficiency moniker.

Retaining most of the above characteristics, turbocharged smaller displacement DELA 30 variant was introduced in 2013 for C400 (W205) and subsequently offered on other models without the name Blue Efficiency.

For 2014 CLS400, a turbocharged larger displacement variant named DELA 35 came out to the market with a lower boost of 0.7 bar (10 psi) compared to 1.8 bar (26 psi) of DELA30 resulting in the same power and torque ratings at a lower fuel consumption.

In 2015, a higher boost and a slightly lower compression ratio (10.5:1) were used to create a DE30LA version for AMG models, and is used for many AMG and Mercedes–Benz vehicles since.

== DE35 ==
Three variants of the naturally aspirated M276 DE 35 engine were produced in 2010–2017 with a displacement of 3.5 L (3,498 cc), bore and stroke of 92.9 mm × 86 mm (3.66 in × 3.39 in). Output of the first variant introduced on 2011 C350 BlueEfficiency with 12.2:1 compression ratio is 215 kW (292 PS; 288 hp) at 6400 rpm with 365 N⋅m (269 lb⋅ft) of torque at 3000–5100 rpm.

Output of the second variant with 12.2:1 compression ratio is 225 kW (306 PS; 302 hp) at 6500 rpm with 370 N⋅m (273 lb⋅ft) of torque at 3500–5250 rpm. S350, CLS350, ML350, E350, R350, C350 and GLK350 models received this higher output version from 2011 to 2015. S400h hybrid model used this engine from 2012 to 2017 in combination with an electric motor in between the engine and torque converter.

A detuned version of this engine was introduced on C300, and used also by E300 and S300 from model year 2013 to 2015, producing 248 hp (185 kW; 251 PS) and 251 lb⋅ft (340 N⋅m) of torque.

=== Applications ===
- 2011–2013 W221 S 350/S 350 4MATIC
- 2011–2014 W212 E 300 BlueEFFICIENCY/E 300 BlueEFFICIENCY 4MATIC
- 2011–2014 W218 CLS 350 BlueEFFICIENCY
- 2011–2014 W204 C 350 / C 350 4MATIC
- 2011–2014 W204 C 350 BlueEFFICIENCY / C 350 BlueEFFICIENCY 4MATIC
- 2012–2014 W204 C 300 4MATIC (US/Canada)
- 2012–2016 W212 E 350 BlueEFFICIENCY / E 350 BlueEFFICIENCY 4MATIC
- 2012–2016 W212 E 400 HYBRID
- 2012–2015 W166 ML 350 BlueEFFICIENCY 4MATIC
- 2015–2018 W166 GLE 350 / GLE 350 4MATIC
- 2012–2015 X204 GLK 350 4MATIC BlueEfficiency
- 2013–2015 X204 GLK 350
- 2012–2014 W251 R 350 4MATIC BlueEfficiency
- 2013–2017 W222 S 400 HYBRID
- 2011–2015 R172 SLK 350 BlueEFFICIENCY

== DE30 LA ==
With a reduced bore and stroke at 88 mm × 82.1 mm (3.46 in × 3.23 in) and reduced compression ratio at 10.7:1, DE 30 LA is turbocharged with twin IHI turbochargers for 245 kW (329 hp; 333 PS) at 5,250–6,000rpm and 480 N⋅m (354 lb⋅ft) of torque at 1,600–4,000rpm and weighs in at 179.2 kg DIN. This engine was introduced on 2013 C400(W205), and used for E400 Coupe 4Matic, ML(GLE)400 4Matic, E450 4Matic, CLS450, S450, S500e and other models.

For 2015–2016, a higher output version is also offered with 362 hp (270 kW; 367 PS) and 384 lb⋅ft (521 N⋅m) on higher boost and 10.5:1 compression ratio for C450 AMG and GLE450 AMG. This engine powers 2017–on AMG SLC43, AMG C43 and AMG GLE43, as well as 2018–2020 E450 4Matic, S560e and other models.

For 2018–2021, another higher output version is offered with 385 hp (287 kW; 390 PS) and 384 lb⋅ft (521 N⋅m) on higher boost.

=== Applications ===
- 2013–2014 W212 E 400/E 400 4MATIC
- 2013–2017 C207 E 400
- 2014–2020 W222 S 400 & S 320 (China)
- 2014–2019 X166 GL 400 / GLS 450
- 2014–2017 C218 CLS 400
- 2014–2017 W222 S 500 PLUG–IN HYBRID
- 2014–2015 W218 CLS 400/CLS 400 4MATIC
- 2015–2019 W166 AMG GLE 43 4MATIC
- 2015–2021 W205 C 400 4MATIC
- 2015–2022 X253 AMG GLC 43 4MATIC
- 2015–2017 W205 C 450 AMG 4MATIC
- 2015–2017 W166 ML 400 / GLE 400 4MATIC
- 2016–2023 BAIC BJ90 (an SUV from Chinese brand BAIC based on the second generation Mercedes-Benz GL-Class)
- 2016–2017 W166 GLE 450 AMG 4MATIC
- 2016–2018 W166 GLE 500 e / GLE 550 e (US) 4MATIC
- 2016–2021 W205 AMG C 43 4MATIC
- 2016–2018 W213 E 400 4MATIC
- 2016–2018 W213 AMG E 43 4MATIC
- 2018–2020 W222 S 580 e
- 2019–2020 W213 E 450 4MATIC
- 2014-2020 R231 SL 400
- 2017-2020 R231 SL 450
- 2016–2018 R172 AMG SLC 43 (362hp version)
- 2019–2020 R172 AMG SLC 43 (385hp version)

== DE35 LA ==
The same bore and stroke of the normally aspirated DE 35 (92.9 mm × 86 mm (3.66 in × 3.39 in)) are used for this turbocharged version, with a lower boost level than the DE 30 LA on the same twin turbocharged format using a different model IHI turbocharger. While the power and torque remained the same, this larger displacement lower boost model yields a lower fuel consumption than the M276 DE 30 LA. Sometimes called DE 35 LA, this engine was offered on S400, CLS400, E400 4Matic (up to 2018) and Maybach S400 4Matic models up to 2017.

=== Applications ===
- 2015–2017 W222 S 400 4MATIC
- 2015–2016 W212 E 400/E 400 4MATIC
- 2015–2017 C218 CLS 400/CLS 400 4MATIC
- 2017–2018 W213 E 400 4MATIC
- 2015–2017 W222 Maybach S 400 4MATIC
