= Mercedes-Benz 560 =

Mercedes-Benz has sold a number of automobiles with the "560" model name:

- 1986–1989 R107
  - 1986–1989 560SL
- 1986–1991 W126
  - 1986–1991 560SEC
  - 1986–1991 560SEL
  - 1989–1991 560SE
- 2013–current W222
  - 2018 S 560 4MATIC
  - 2018 Mercedes-Maybach S 560 4MATIC
  - 2018 S 560 e Plug-In Hybrid
- 2014–current C217
  - 2018 S 560 Coupe 4MATIC
  - 2018 S 560 Cabriolet 4MATIC
