= Nissan Fuga =

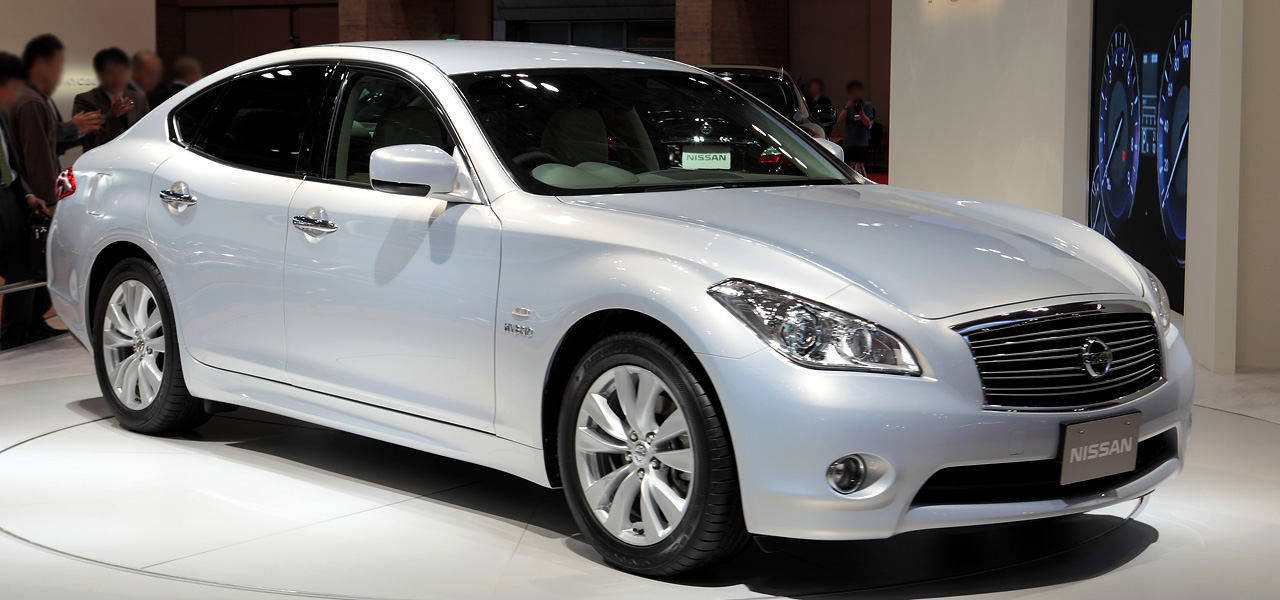
- 2009 Nissan Fuga Hybrid (Y51)

Overview
- Manufacturer: Nissan
- Also called: Infiniti M/Q70 (2006–2019)
- Production: 2004–2022
- Assembly: Japan: Kaminokawa, Tochigi

Body and chassis
- Class: Executive/mid-size luxury car (E)
- Body style: 4-door sedan
- Related: Nissan Skyline; Nissan Cedric; Nissan Gloria

Chronology
- Predecessor: Nissan Gloria; Nissan Cima (F50); Nissan Cedric; Nissan Leopard

The Nissan Fuga (Japanese: 日産・フーガ Nissan Fūga) is a mid-size luxury sedan produced by Japanese automaker Nissan from 2004 to 2022. It is built on a wider, stretched wheelbase version of the Nissan FM platform. After the Nissan Cima and Nissan President were discontinued in August 2010, the Fuga became Nissan's flagship vehicle. In North America and Europe, the Fuga was sold as the second and third-generation Infiniti M and Infiniti Q70, where it was the flagship sedan of the Infiniti luxury division of Nissan from 2006 to 2019. In 2022, the Fuga was discontinued alongside the Cima, leaving the Skyline as Nissan's sole sedan offering in Japan.

First shown as the Fuga Concept at the 2003 Tokyo Motor Show, the F51 replaced the long-running Nissan Cedric, Gloria, Cima and President. The name derives from the Italian fuga, for fugue, the musical composition form.

== First generation (Y50; 2004) ==
First generation (Y50)
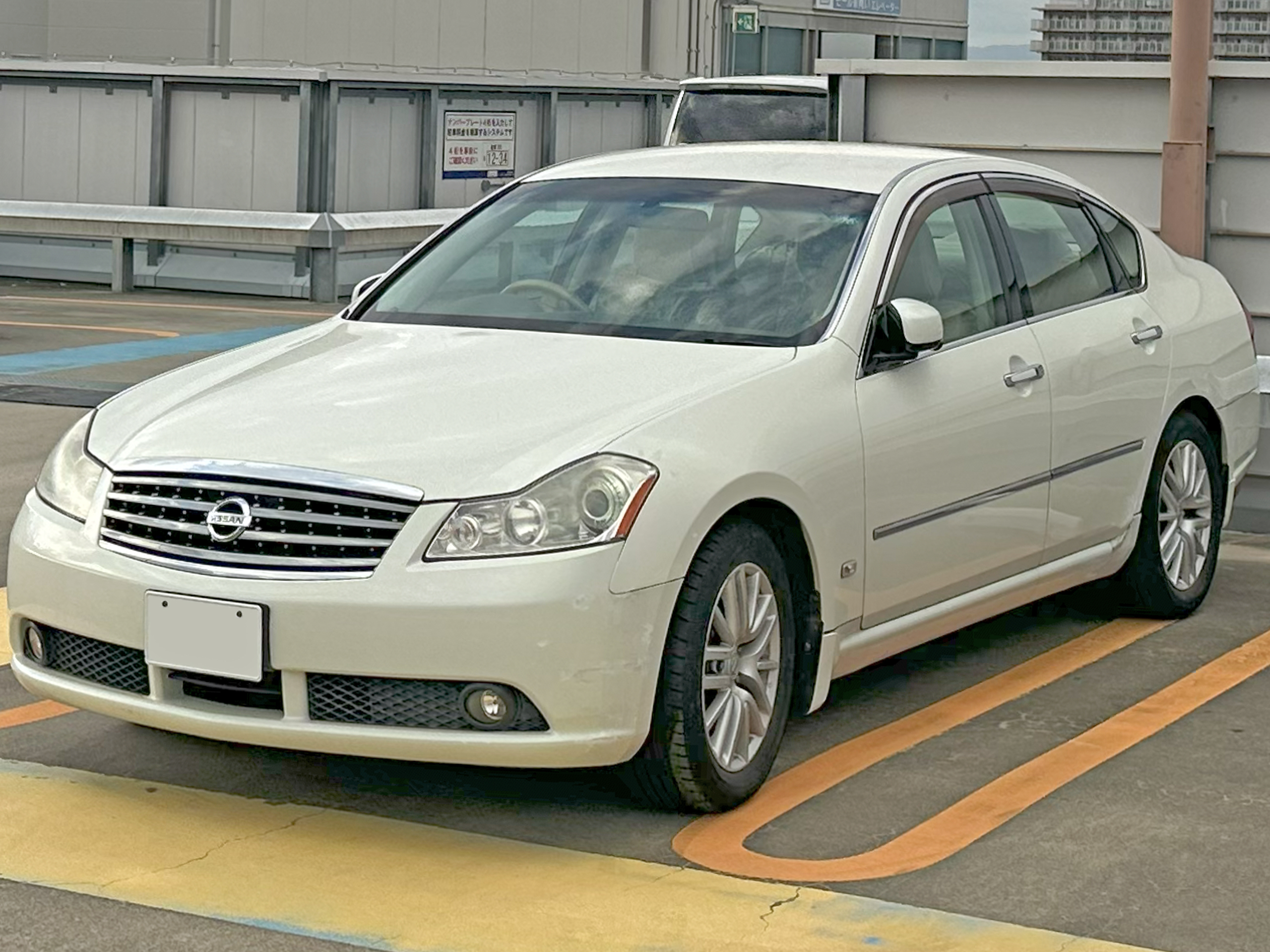
- 2004–2007 Nissan Fuga 250GT

Overview
- Also called: Infiniti M35/45 (export)
- Production: October 2004 – November 2009
- Model years: 2005–2010 (Infiniti M35/45)
- Designer: Tatsuo Osawa (chief designer); Mamoru Aoki

Body and chassis
- Body style: 4-door sedan
- Layout: FR layout; AWD
- Platform: FR-L "enhanced FM"

Powertrain
- Engine: 2.5 L V6 VQ25DE; 2.5 L V6 VQ25HR; 3.5 L V6 VQ35DE; 3.5 L V6 VQ35HR; 4.5 L V8 VK45DE
- Transmission: 5-speed automatic

Dimensions
- Wheelbase: 2,900 mm (114.2 in)
- Length: 4,900 mm (192.9 in)
- Width: 1,805 mm (71.1 in)
- Height: 1,510 mm (59.4 in)
- Curb weight: 1,780 kg (3,924 lb)

The Fuga was launched in Japan on 14 October 2004, as the successor to the Cedric and Gloria.

When the Prince (Nissan) Gloria was first introduced in 1959, it was based on a stretched version of the original Prince Skyline, which was first introduced in 1957. Nissan used this approach again for the Fuga, using the Skyline platform again. The Fuga was available at Japanese Nissan dealerships called Nissan Red Stage and Nissan Blue Stage until Blue Stage and Red Stage dealerships were combined into one Japanese Nissan dealership network utilized internationally in 2005.

Nissan wanted to create a fresh approach started by the Cedric/Gloria and focus its efforts to compete with European executive mid-sized sports sedans, such as the BMW 5 series, Audi A6, Mercedes-Benz E-Class and Jaguar S-Type. The Fuga's primary competitor is the Toyota Crown Athlete Series, but also competes with the Lexus GS, as well as Honda Legend.

The Fuga trim levels were divided into the "XV" and "GT" trims, including significant styling differences (different grilles, taillights). This was the result of the car having been intended to be sold as either a Cedric or a Gloria, with the XV replacing the Cedric and the GT the Gloria. After the 2007 facelift, the range was unified into the GT model.

The 450GT was released in August 2005. It was equipped with the same 4.5L VK45DE engine as the one previously installed in the North American market Infiniti M45. However, in order to prioritize responsiveness and power, the maximum output of the Japanese model was 333 PS (245 kW; 328 hp) compared to 340 PS (250 kW; 335 hp) in the North American market M45.

From 2005 until 2007, the Fuga was imported to China, with the sole engine choice being the VQ35DE(NEO) Upon the introduction of the Infiniti brand to China in 2008, the Fuga was discontinued in favor of the Infiniti M.

The export version sold as the second-generation Infiniti M (M35/45). The Infiniti M became the flagship of the Infiniti luxury division after the 2006 model year, as the Infiniti Q (the Cima's counterpart in certain markets) was discontinued. However the Cima would remain in production for the Japanese domestic market and it is 2 in (51 mm) longer than the Fuga which slots below it in the lineup.

The Fuga is also used as an uplevel taxi in Japan.

Mitsuoka Motors, a small Japanese automobile company, uses the Nissan Fuga as a base for their Galue-III luxury sedan which has been produced since 2005 until 2010.

=== Equipment ===
Aluminium is used in the body, hood, trunk lid and door internal structure to reduce weight. The front suspension uses a double wishbone setup, also to reduce unsprung weight, and to improve vehicle handling. This type of suspension was previously used on the Cedric/Gloria until 1983, when that platform began to use MacPherson struts for the front suspension, but still uses the multilink rear suspension which was introduced on the Cedric/Gloria in 1979. The Fuga uses aluminum alloy extensively in both the front and rear suspension components.

The GT sports package includes Nissan's 4WS version of HICAS to improve stability and handling, taking advantage of the 53:47 weight distribution.

A driver aid system used in Japan, called Distance Control Assistance, pushes the gas pedal against the foot when the DVD navigation with GPS determines that an unsafe speed is being maintained. If the Autonomous cruise control system is being used, the Distance Control Assistance will reduce speed automatically, and will warn the driver that an adjustment is being made with an audible bell sound.

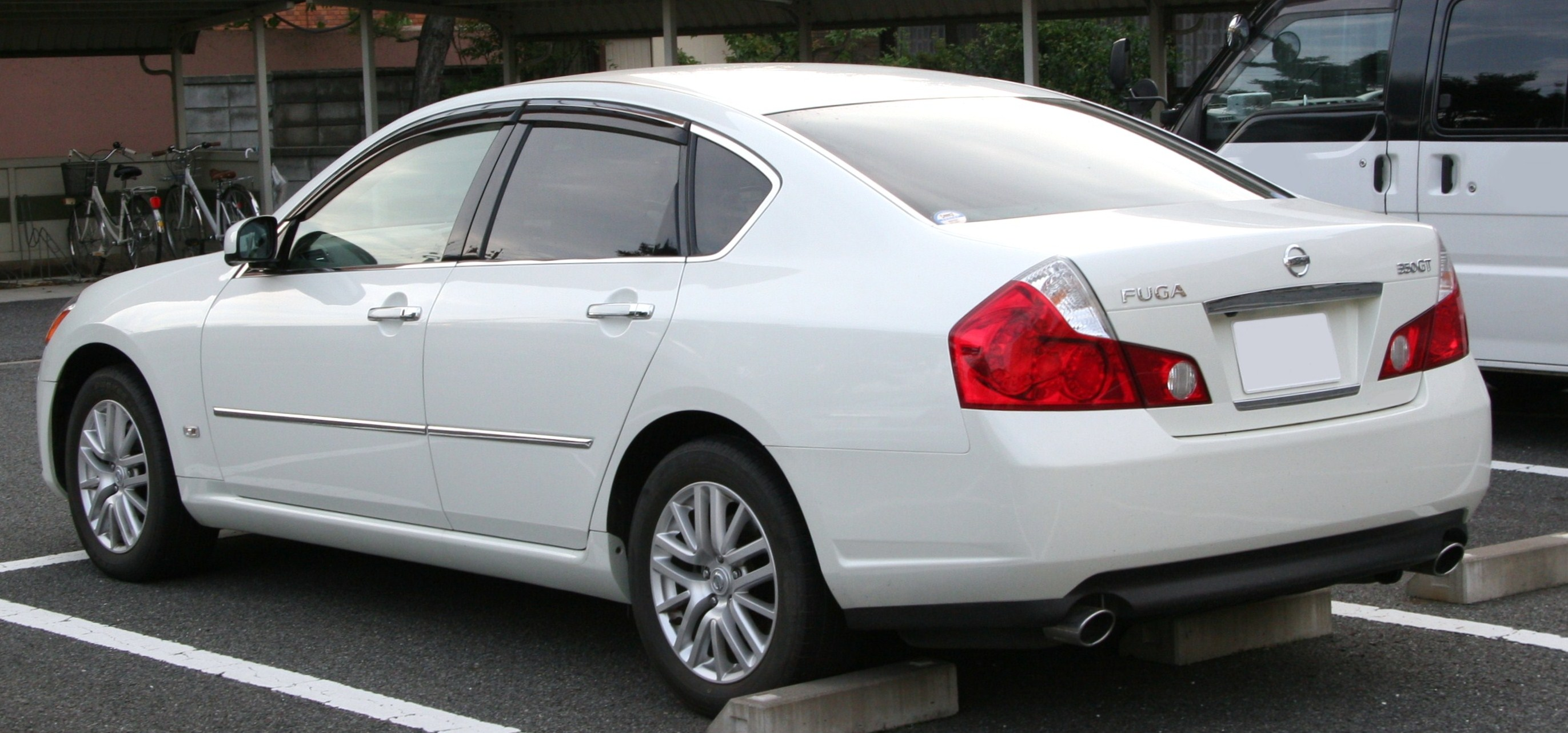
Nissan Fuga (Japan)

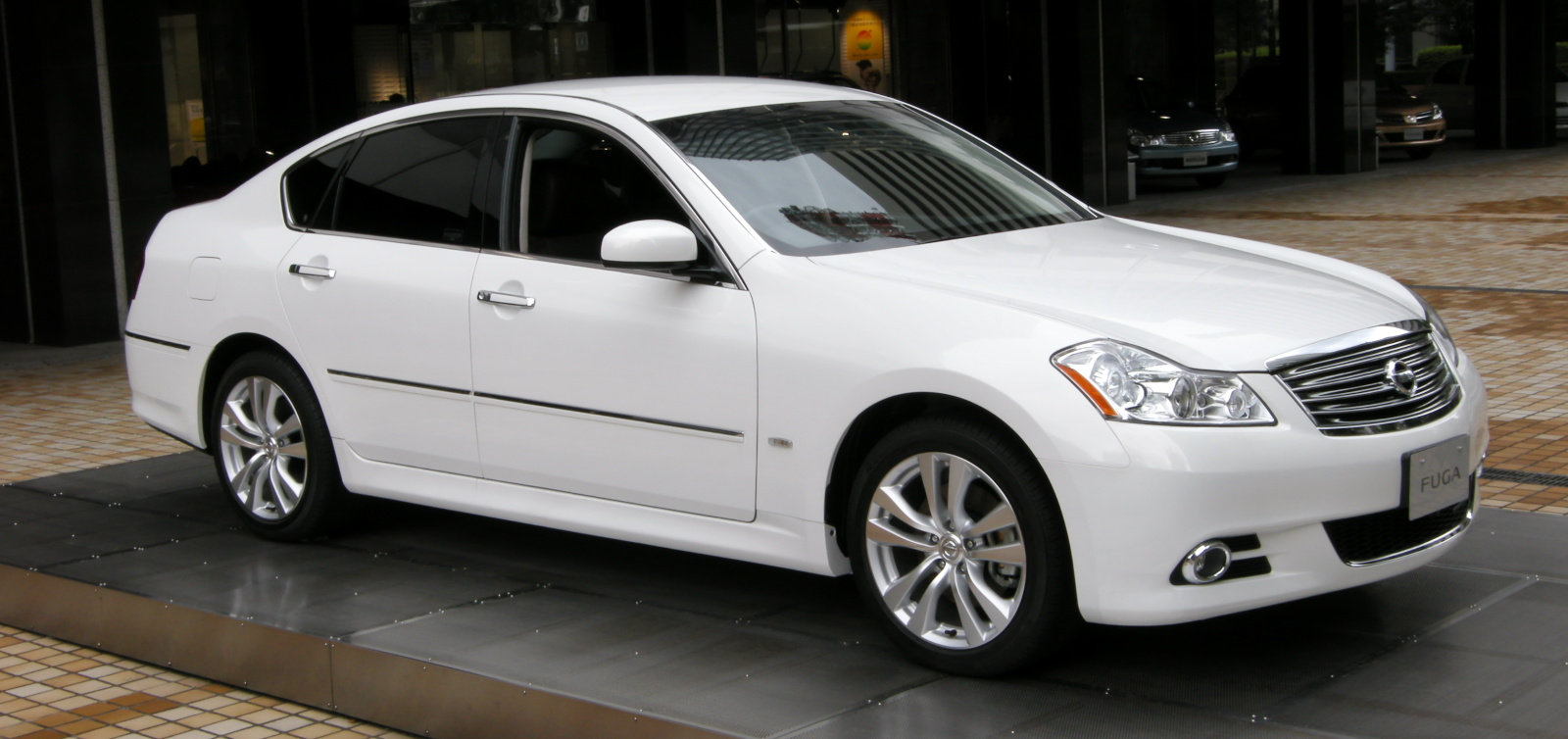
2007–2009 Nissan Fuga 450GT

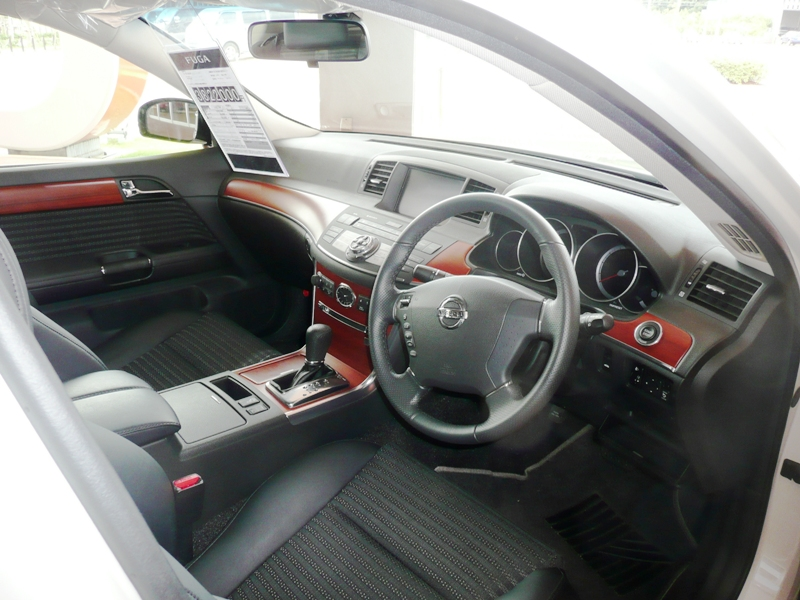
2004–2007 Interior

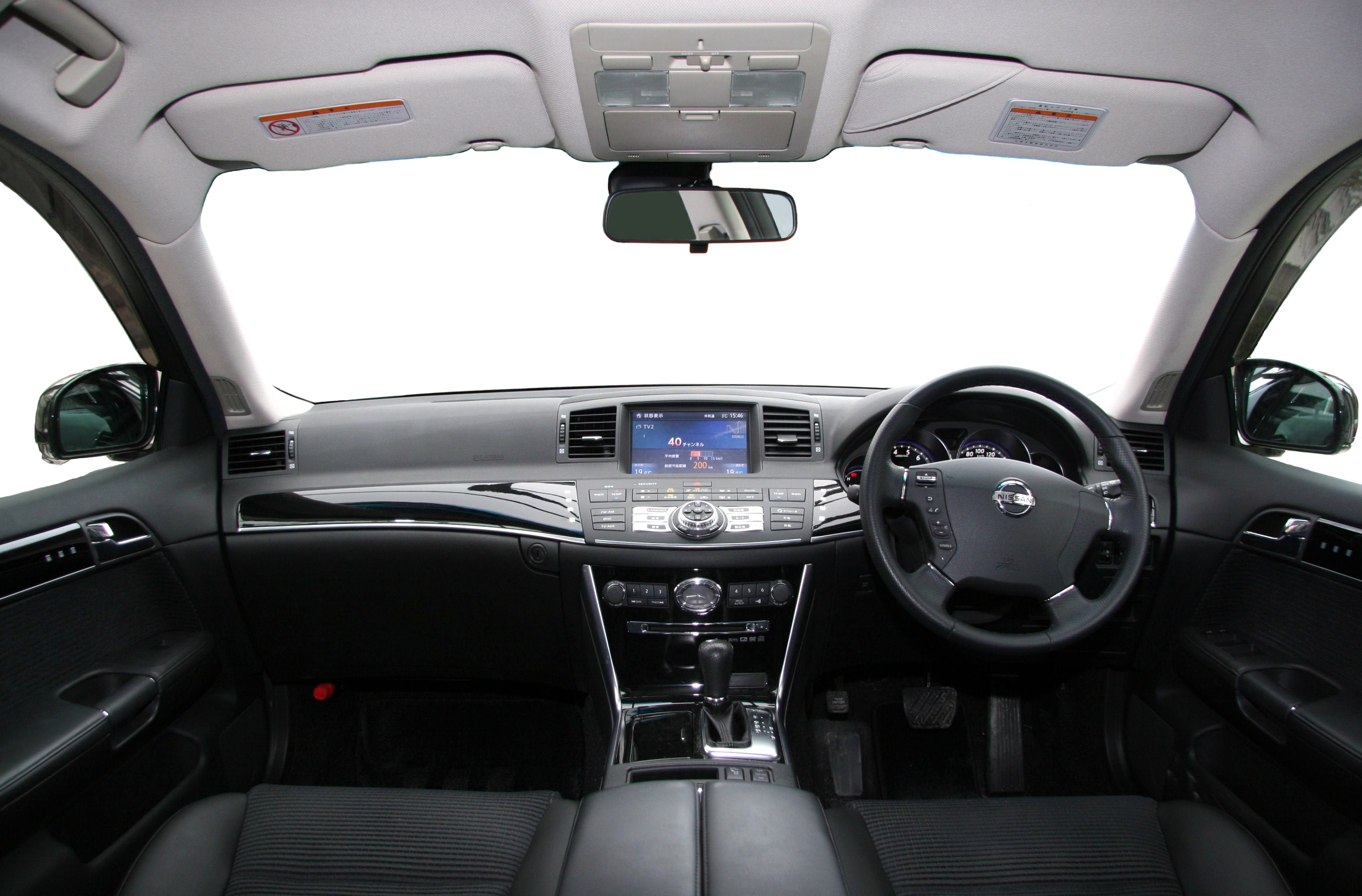
2007–2009 facelift Interior

=== Body styles ===
Chassis code	(CBA-)Y50	(CBA-P)Y50	(CBA-PN)Y50	(CBA-G)Y50
Engine	VQ25DE(NEO)	VQ35DE(NEO)	VQ35DE(NEO)	VK45DE(NEO)
Drive	RWD	RWD	ATTESA E-TS 4WD	RWD

Chassis code	(DBA-)Y50	(DBA-P)Y50	(DBA-PN)Y50	(CBA-G)Y50
Engine	VQ25HR	VQ35HR	VQ35HR	VK45DE(NEO)
Drive	RWD	RWD	ATTESA E-TS 4WD	RWD

=== Engines ===
Engine code	Years	Layout	Compression (:1)	Power, torque at rpm
VQ25DE(NEO)	2004–2007	2,495 cc (152.3 cu in) V6	10.3	210 PS (154 kW; 207 hp) at 6000, 265 N⋅m (195 lb⋅ft) at 4400
VQ25HR	2007-2010	2,495 cc (152.3 cu in) V6	10.3	223 PS (164 kW; 220 hp) at 6800, 263 N⋅m (194 lb⋅ft) at 4800
VQ35DE(NEO)	2004–2007	3,498 cc (213.5 cu in) V6	10.3	280 PS (206 kW; 276 hp) at 6200, 363 N⋅m (268 lb⋅ft) at 4800
VQ35HR	2007–2010	3,498 cc (213.5 cu in) V6	10.6	313 PS (230 kW; 309 hp) at 6800, 358 N⋅m (264 lb⋅ft) at 4800
VK45DE(NEO)	2004–2010	4,494 cc (274.2 cu in) V8	10.5	333 PS (245 kW; 328 hp) at 6400, 455 N⋅m (336 lb⋅ft) at 4000

=== Specifications ===
Model	250GT, 250XV	350GT, 350XV	450GT
Layout	6-Cylinder-V-Motor (four stroke), Angle 60°		8-Cylinder-V-Motor (four stroke), 90°
Displacement	2,495 cubic centimetres (152.3 cu in)	3,498 cubic centimetres (213.5 cu in)	4,494 cubic centimetres (274.2 cu in)
Engine type	VQ25DE (NEO)	VQ35DE (NEO)	VK45DE (NEO)
Bore x Stroke(mm)	85x73.3	95.5x81.4	93x82.7
Maximum Power/rpm	210 PS (154 kW; 207 hp) at 6000	280 PS (206 kW; 276 hp) at 6200	333 PS (245 kW; 328 hp) at 6400
Maximum Torque/rpm	265 N⋅m (195 lbf⋅ft) at 4400	363 N⋅m (268 lbf⋅ft) at 4800	455 N⋅m (336 lbf⋅ft) at 4000
Compression ratio (:1)	10.3	10.3	10.5
Valve gear	Chain driven DOHC, 4 valves per cylinder		
Transmission	5 speed automatic with manual mode		
Suspension front	Double wishbone axle, coil springs		
Suspension rear	Multi-link axle, coil springs		
Brakes	Power assisted disc brakes		
Steering	Rack and pinion, servo assisted optional all wheel steering "Super-Hicas"		
Body	Steel monocoque, with subframe		
Track front/rear	1540/1555mm		
Wheelbase	2900 mm		
Length x breadth x height	4930 x 1805 x 1510 mm		
Weight empty	1,670 kg (3,682 lb)	1,700–1,760 kg (3,748–3,880 lb)	1,770–1,800 kg (3,902–3,968 lb)
Top speed	not published		
0–100 km/h (0–62 mph)	not published		
Consumption (L./100 Kilometer, Japanese std cycle)	9,0 High octane	10,7–11,5 High octane	12,4 High octane
Domestic price	¥3.969–4.200 m (12/07); EUR equivalent €25,800–27,300	¥4.494–5.334 m (12/07); EUR equivalent €29,200–34,700	¥5.712–6.279 m (2008); EUR equivalent €37,100–40,800

=== Marketing ===
When the Fuga was first introduced for sale October 14, 2004 the advertising campaign used a musical work in the fugue style. The work is titled "Vortex", composed and arranged by Akihiko Matsumoto, and was specially commissioned for Nissan. The music was played in three movements by a full orchestra for 7 minutes and 42 seconds, and a recording was given to dealers in Japan as a promotional DVD-CD gift for customers called "Fuga The Movie and Premium Soundtrack", free of charge.

The DVD and CD package was not available for private sale, with the DVD providing a gallery of images, and descriptions of key technologies such as how the adaptive cruise control functions, various safety technologies like the Blind Spot camera, which is a camera installed on the passenger side side view mirror displaying a view of the curb on the in-dash monitor, and a movie with the Fuga on a mountain road, using the "Vortex" soundtrack. The DVD is recorded in Dolby 5.1 surround sound.

== Second generation (Y51; 2009) ==
Second generation (Y51)
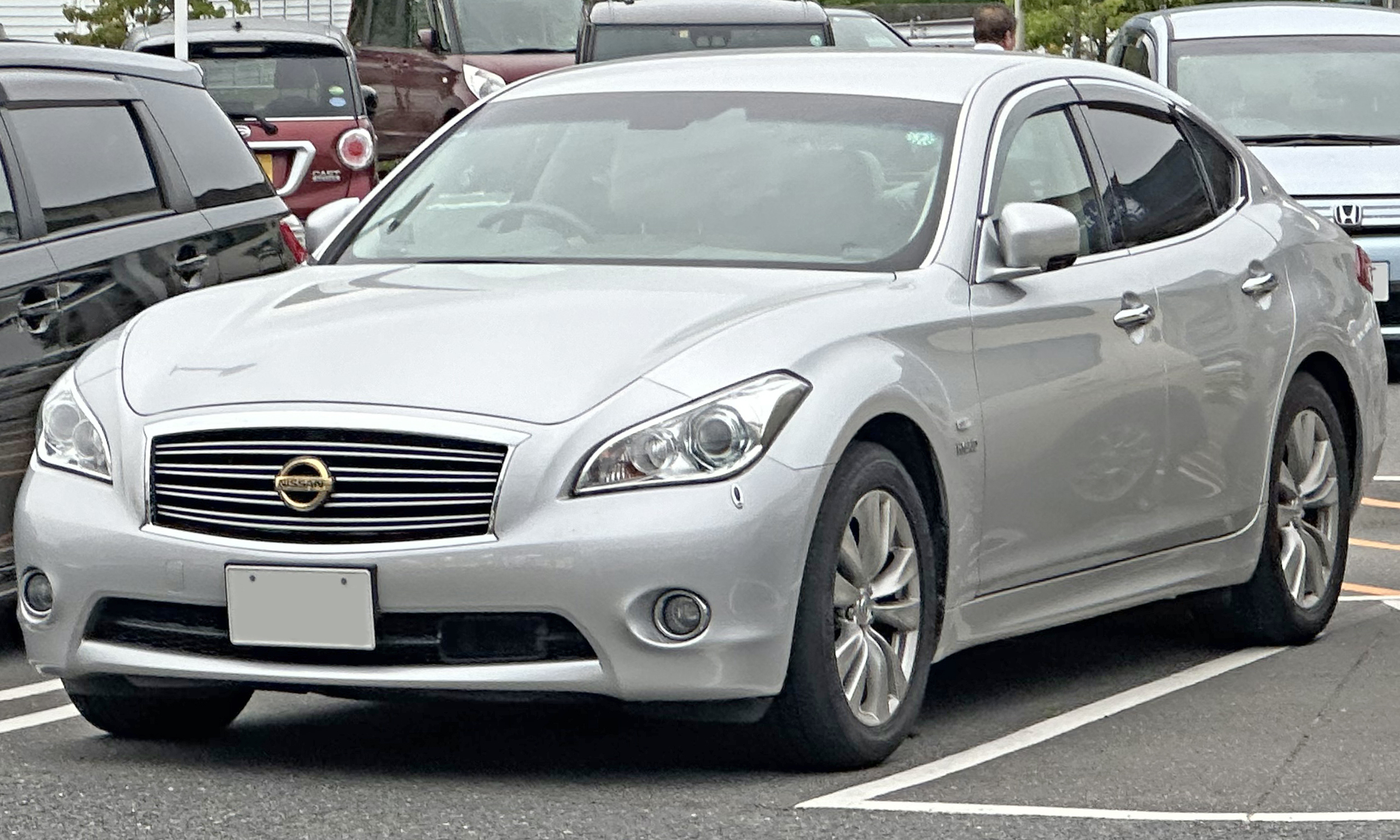
- Nissan Fuga Hybrid VIP (HY51) in Japan

Overview
- Also called: Mitsubishi Proudia/Infiniti M/Q70; Mitsubishi Dignity/Nissan Cima/Infiniti Q70L (LWB)
- Production: 2009–2022
- Designer: Hideo Komuro (2007)

Body and chassis
- Body style: 4-door sedan
- Layout: FR layout/AWD
- Platform: FR-L "enhanced FM"
- Related: Infiniti M Infiniti FX; Infiniti G Infiniti EX; Nissan 370Z; Nissan Skyline

Powertrain
- Engine: 2.5 L V6 VQ25HR; 3.7 L V6 VQ37VHR; 3.5 L V6 (Hybrid) VQ35HR
- Electric motor: 68PS Nissan HM34 high-response Motor (3.5 L models only)
- Transmission: 7-speed Jatco JR712E automatic
- Hybrid drivetrain: Intelligent Dual Clutch Control
- Battery: 1.4 kWh Li-ion

Dimensions
- Wheelbase: 2,900 mm (114.2 in)
- Length: 4,945 mm (194.7 in)
- Width: 1,845 mm (72.6 in)
- Height: 1,500 mm (59.1 in)
- Curb weight: 1,720 kg (3,792 lb)

The second generation Nissan Fuga, was previewed at the 2009 Pebble Beach Concours d'Elegance as the Infiniti M.

The second-generation Fuga debuted at the 2009 Tokyo Motor Show. The production version went on sale across Japan starting on 21 December 2009. It is sold in overseas markets under the Infiniti nameplate as the third-generation M (M37/M56/35h/30d). The second generation Fuga's body design (styled by Hideo Komuro in 2007), took on a more organic look. and was a resurrection of a 1960s and 1970s appearance called "coke bottle styling" that was used on the 1970s Nissan Cedric and Nissan Gloria.

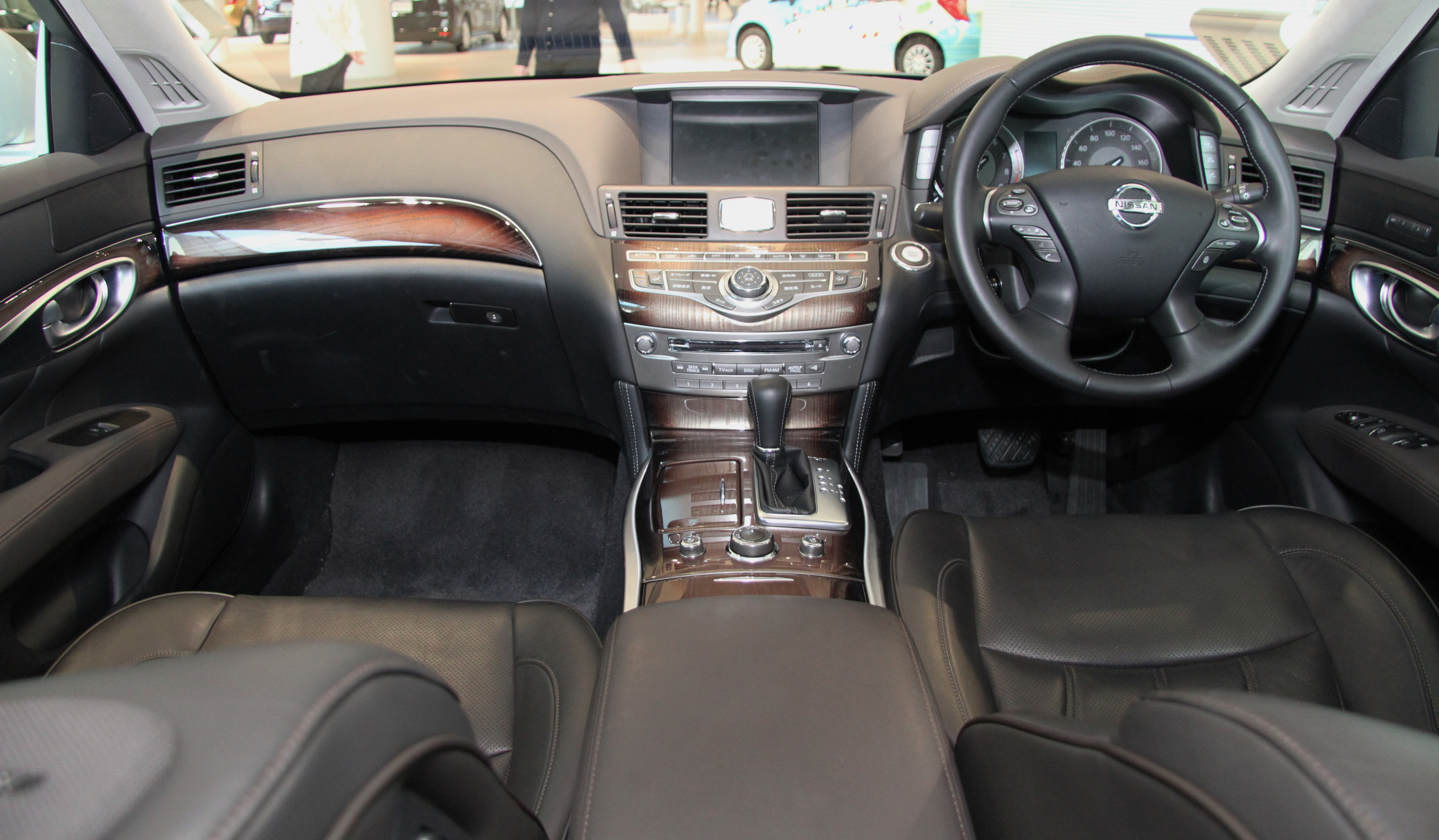
Interior

The Y51 Nissan Fuga introduced November 2009 is only 50 mm (2.0 in) shorter than the F50 series Nissan Cima, with the same width dimensions of 1,845 mm (6.1 ft) and height of 1,515 mm (5.0 ft) compared to the Cima's of 1,490 mm (4.9 ft) height.

In August 2010, the Fuga became Nissan's flagship with the announcement of the cancellation of the Nissan Cima and the Nissan President. The Fuga is 115 mm (4.5 in) shorter than the Nissan President, and the Fuga has a longer wheelbase at 2,900 mm (114.2 in), compared to the wheelbase on the President and Cima at 2,870 mm (113.0 in). When the Fuga assumed the role as flagship sedan of Nissan Japan August 2010, it became the first time that Nissan didn't sell a premium luxury V8 sedan in Japan; the Fuga's North American cousin, the Infiniti M56, is offered with a V8 shared with the Infiniti QX56.

World first Wrong-way driving warning debuted on the Fuga hybrid in 2010.

The VK45DE V8 engine used in the previous generation is no longer offered in Japan, neither is the succeeding VK56VD V8 which is only found on the Fuga's North American counterpart, the Infiniti M56. The larger 5.6L engine incurs a higher rate of road tax liability which hampers sales. The VQ35HR 3.5 L V6 Hybrid is now the Fuga's third engine option, utilizing the Atkinson cycle. The electric motor, installed in parallel between the engine and the transmission, produces 68 PS (50 kW; 67 bhp) from 1.3kWh lithium-ion batteries that are expected to have a service life of 10 years. The batteries are installed upright behind the rear seats. The Fuga Hybrid introduced Nissan's first in-house developed electric hybrid technology, and Nissan claims it will double the fuel economy of its gasoline-powered version.

A driving mode selector knob has been installed as standard equipment on all models, situated below the transmission gear lever and between the heated and ventilated front seat controls, providing four selections labeled "Standard", "Sport", "Eco", and "Snow", allowing the 7-speed transmission, engine and various systems to optimize driving based on varying conditions. To minimize exhaust noise intrusion into the passenger compartment from the engine at low RPMs, "Active Noise Control" has been installed. Double-piston shock absorbers, developed by Kayaba Industry Company, have replaced the ones previously supplied by Hitachi.

Trim levels offered in Japan start with the 250GT, 250GT Type P, 250GT "A" package; 370GT, 370GT FOUR (AWD), 370GT FOUR (AWD) "A" package, 370GT Type S, with the 370VIP at the top of the range.

Some of the optional interior equipment includes heated and ventilated front seats, a 16 speaker Bose "studio surround" audio system, power reclining rear seats, power ottoman for the rear passenger opposite the driver, and HDD navigation combined with a telematics subscription service called "CarWings" in Japan.

The Nissan Fuga Hybrid, together with the Nissan Leaf, will include Nissan's new Vehicle Sound for Pedestrians system to alert pedestrians, the blind and others to their presence when the hybrid is operating at low speeds in all-electric mode.

The Fuga received a major facelift in February 2015. The front fascia was redesigned to resemble the Skyline, and the Nissan logo was replaced with an Infiniti logo.

In December 2019, the Fuga and its sister model, the Fuga, underwent minor changes. The Infiniti logo, which had been present during the first facelift in February 2015, was returned to the Nissan logo.

In 2022, Nissan ended production of the Fuga, as well as the Cima, with no plans for a successor for either model.

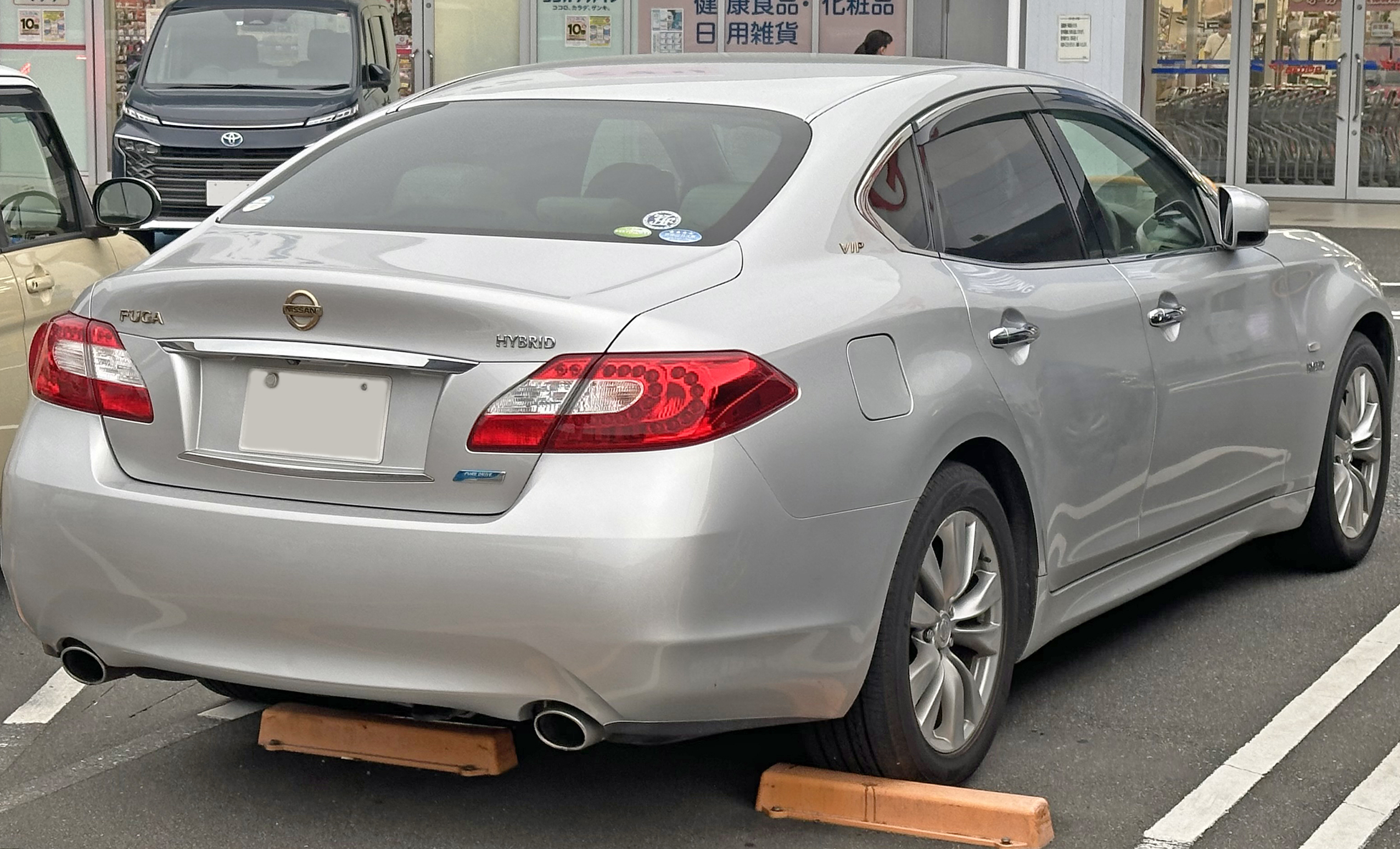
2009 Nissan Fuga Hybrid (HY51, Japan)

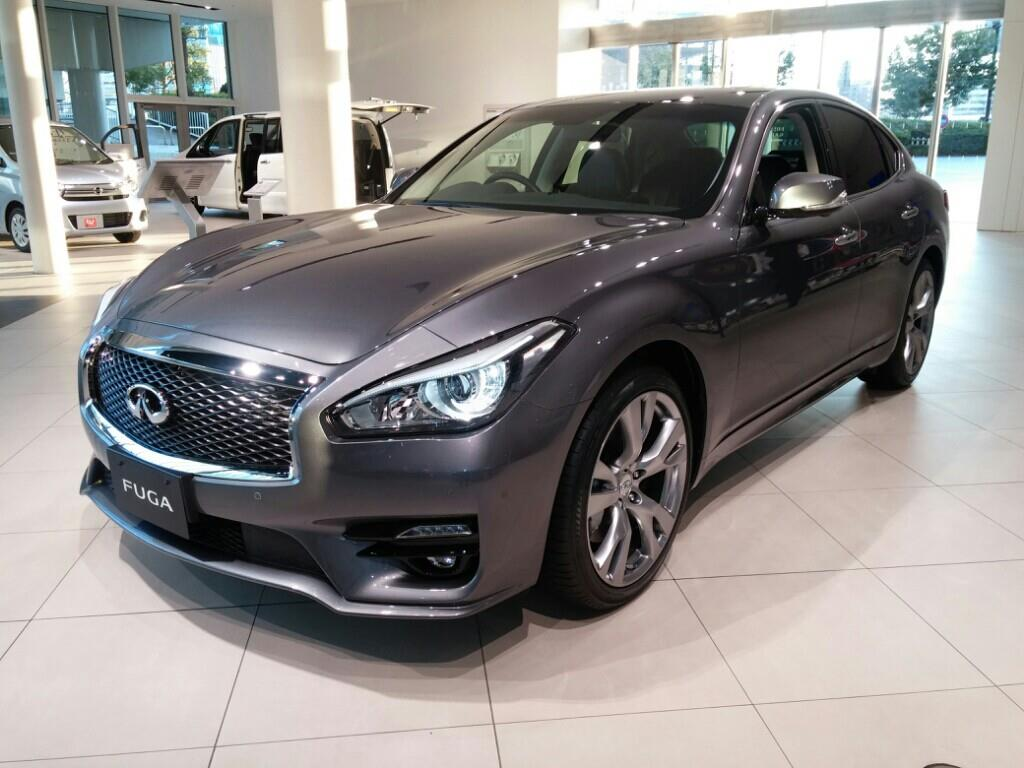
2016 Nissan Fuga 370GT Type S (KY51; facelift, Japan)

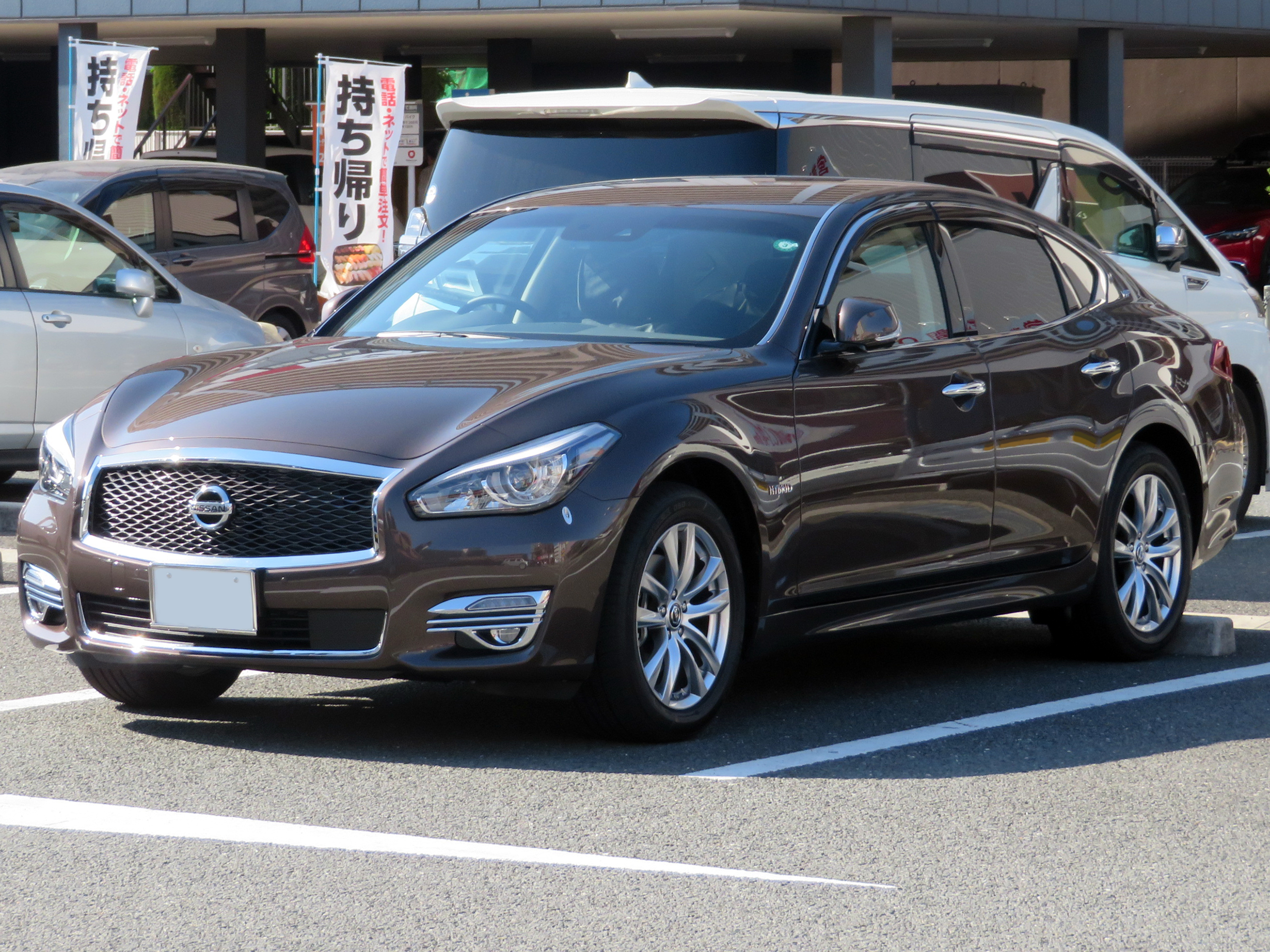
2020 Nissan Fuga Hybrid VIP (HY51; facelift, Japan)

=== Engines ===
Model	Years	Type/code	Power, torque at rpm
370GT	2009–2022	3.7L V6 24-valve VVEL (VQ37VHR)	333 PS (245 kW; 328 hp) at 7000, 363 N⋅m (268 lb⋅ft) at 5200
250GT	2009–2022	2.5L V6 24-valve (VQ25HR)	225 PS (165 kW; 222 hp) at 6400, 258 N⋅m (190 lb⋅ft) at 4800
Hybrid	2010–2022	3.5L V6 24-valve (VQ35HR)	313 PS (230 kW; 309 hp) at 6800, 358 N⋅m (264 lb⋅ft) at 4800; 68 PS (50 kW; 67 hp) from electric motor
