= Mercedes-Benz S-Class (C217) =

Mercedes-Benz C217/A217
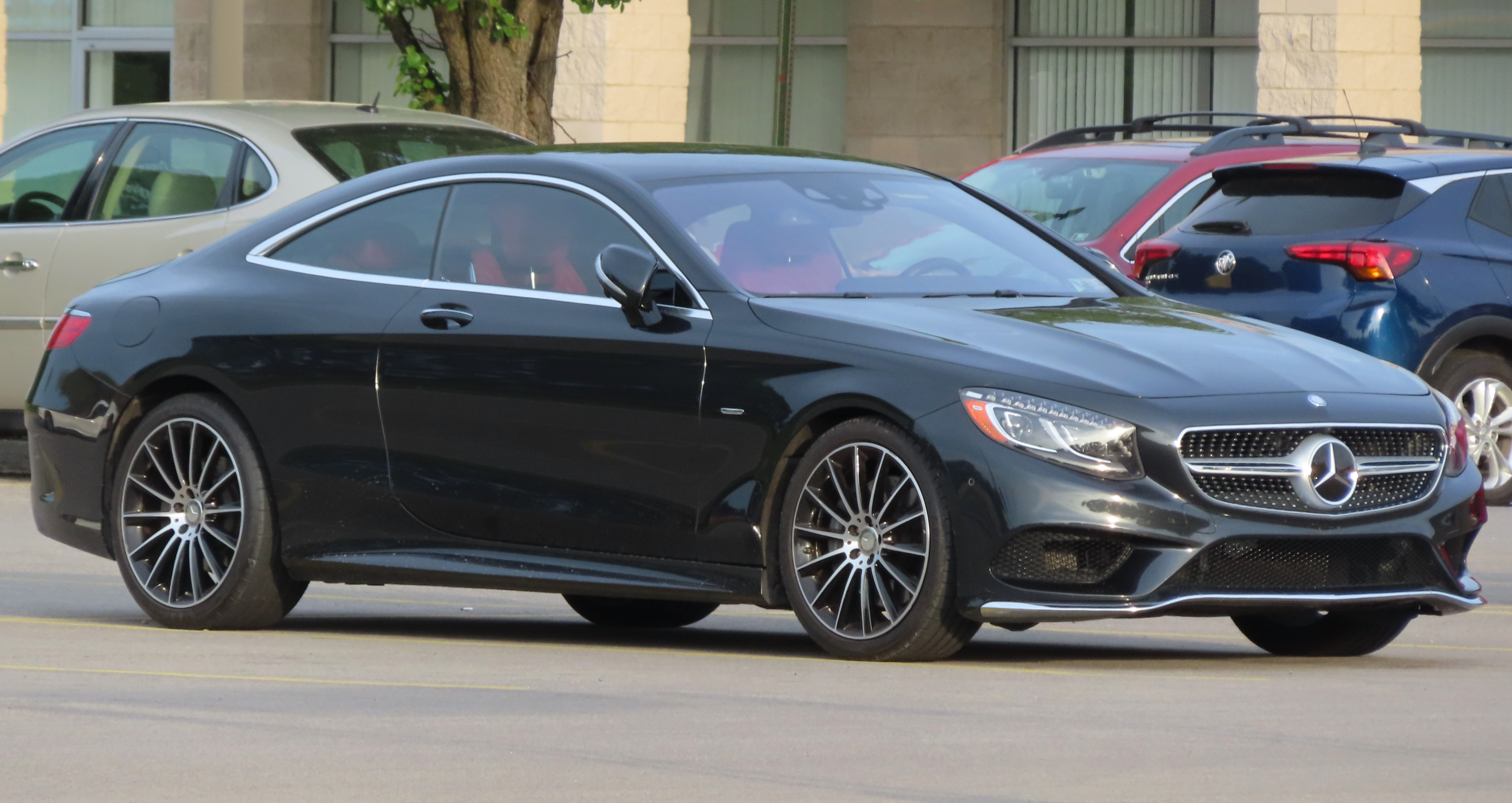

Overview
- Manufacturer: Daimler AG
- Production: November 2014 – August 2020
- Model years: 2015–2021
- Assembly: Germany: Sindelfingen
- Designer: Robert Lešnik

Body and chassis
- Class: Grand tourer (S)
- Body style: 2-door coupé (C217); 2-door convertible (A217)
- Layout: Front-engine, rear-wheel-drive or all-wheel-drive (4Matic)
- Related: Mercedes-Benz S-Class (W222)

Powertrain
- Engine: 3.0 L M276 twin-turbo V6; 4.0 L M177 twin-turbo V8; 4.7 L M278 twin-turbo V8; 5.5 L M157 twin-turbo V8; 6.0 L M279 twin-turbo V12
- Transmission: 7-speed 7G-Tronic automatic 9-speed 9G-Tronic automatic

Dimensions
- Wheelbase: 2,945 mm (115.9 in)
- Length: 5,027 mm (197.9 in)
- Width: 1,899 mm (74.8 in)
- Height: 1,411 mm (55.6 in)

Chronology
- Predecessor: Mercedes-Benz CL-Class (C216)
- Successor: Mercedes-AMG SL-Class (R232)

The Mercedes-Benz S-Class Coupé and Convertible (C217/A217) are grand tourers manufactured by Mercedes-Benz from 2014 to 2020.

== Development ==
=== Concept S-Class Coupé (2013) ===
The Concept S-Class Coupé was unveiled at the 2013 Frankfurt Motor Show to showcase the appearance of the upcoming S-Class coupé model. It features a new design compared to the previous CL-Class model, utilizing the brand's Sensual Purity design philosophy first developed for the W222 S-Class in 2009. Like previous CL models, though, it retains the pillarless design with no B pillar between the front and rear side windows.

=== Production car unveiling ===
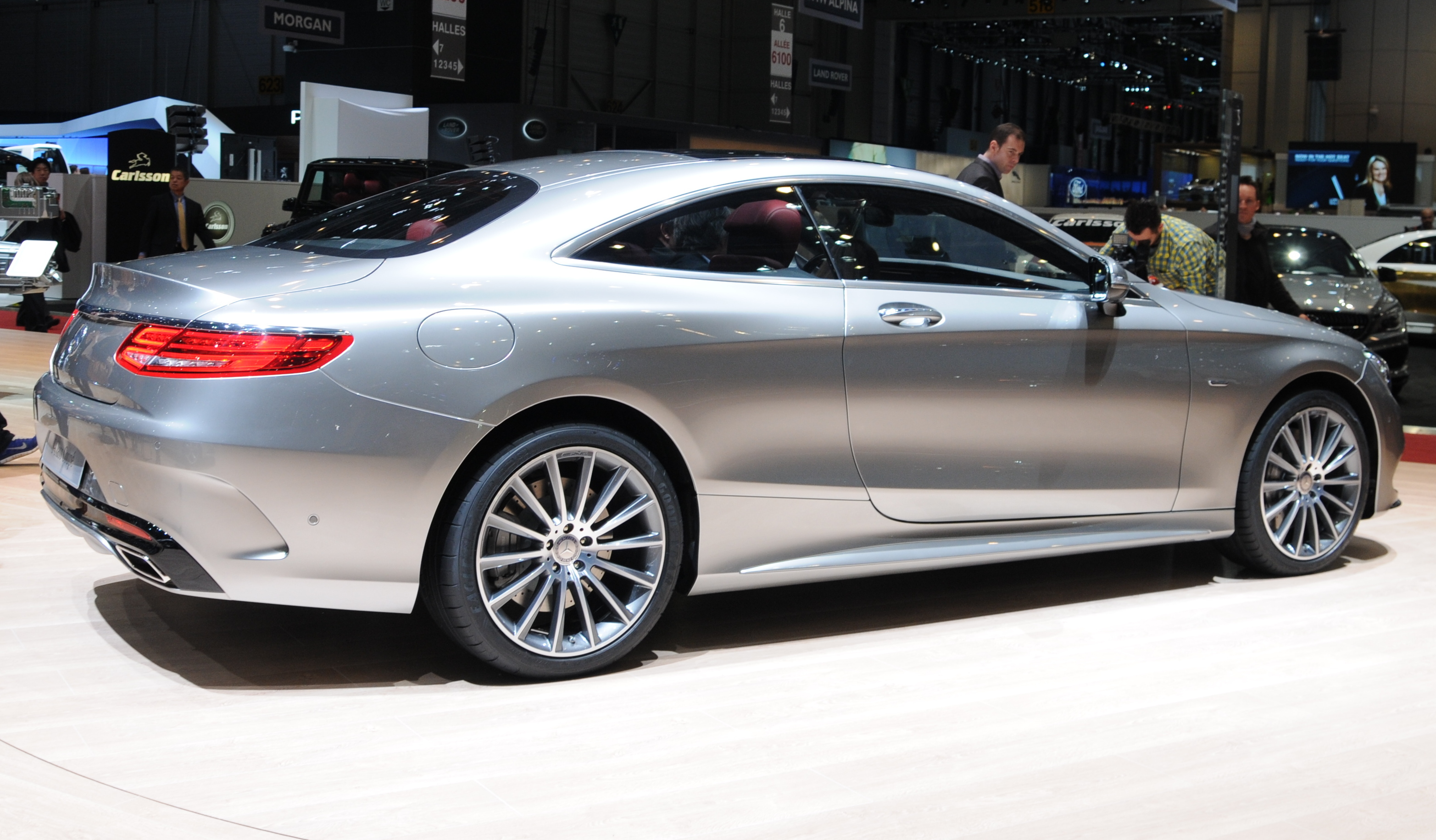
Mercedes S-Class Coupé at the 2014 Geneva Motor Show

The production version of the S-Class coupé was announced and unveiled in February 2014, with its first public showing at the Geneva Motor Show in March 2014. Mercedes showed the S 500 model (known as the S 550 in the United States market) at the Geneva show.

At the New York Auto Show in April 2014, Mercedes made the first public showing of the S 63 AMG 4MATIC model. The S 65 AMG model, which includes a V12 Bi-Turbo engine, was unveiled in July 2014.

=== Facelift ===
In September 2017, the S-Class Coupé facelift was launched at the 2017 Frankfurt Auto Show. The outgoing S 500/S 550 nameplate has been replaced by the S 560. A whole new range of engines have been introduced. The new M177 4.0 V8 Biturbo replaces the old M157 5.5 V8 Biturbo in the AMG S 63 4MATIC+. 4MATIC+ All Wheel Drive is now standard in the AMG S 63 featuring drift mode. The S 560 uses a detuned version of the same engine, dubbed the M176. A new 9G-Tronic transmission is now standard across the range, with the exception of the AMG S 65, which still uses the 7G-Tronic.

=== Discontinuation ===
The S-Class Coupé and Cabriolet were discontinued after the 2021 model year without replacement. The market for the full-sized S-Class Coupé and Cabriolet had never really caught on, with customers likely better served by the SL-Class hardtop convertible or E-Class Coupé/Cabriolet, the latter two nameplates having more brand equity. Although Mercedes-Benz had released numerous model variants in the early 2010s to grow sales, by the end of the decade Mercedes-Benz aimed to simplify its lineup to leave room for new electric vehicles, as well as making things less complex for its dealers.

== Safety and technology ==
It features driver assistance and safety technology, including Traffic Sign Assist with wrong-way driving warning function.

=== Suspension ===
The C217 coupé continued to offer the AIRMATIC semi-active air suspension as standard. The C217 introduced an update to the hydraulic fully active Magic Body Control suspension (which debuted on the W222 sedan model), which allows the vehicle to lean up to 2.5 degrees into a turn, similar to the way a motorcycle leans into a turn. The leaning is intended to counter the effect of centrifugal force on the occupants and was available only on rear-wheel drive models.

=== Lighting ===
Like the W222 saloon, the C217 coupé includes full-LED lighting on the exterior (including full-LED headlamps with Intelligent Light System and Adaptive Highbeam Assist PLUS) and interior of the vehicle. Optional headlight features include 47 Swarovski crystals in each headlamp: 30 crystals for the turn signals and 17 for the daytime running lights.

== Models ==
=== S 500 / S 550 ===
The C217 S-Class coupé launched with the S 500 model, known as the S 550 in the United States market. The vehicle features a twin-turbocharged 4.7L engine paired with a 7-speed or a 9-speed (only for rear-wheel drive version) automatic transmission. In most markets, the S 500 is fitted to a rear-wheel drive drivetrain with optional 4MATIC all-wheel drive; in the US, 4MATIC is standard.

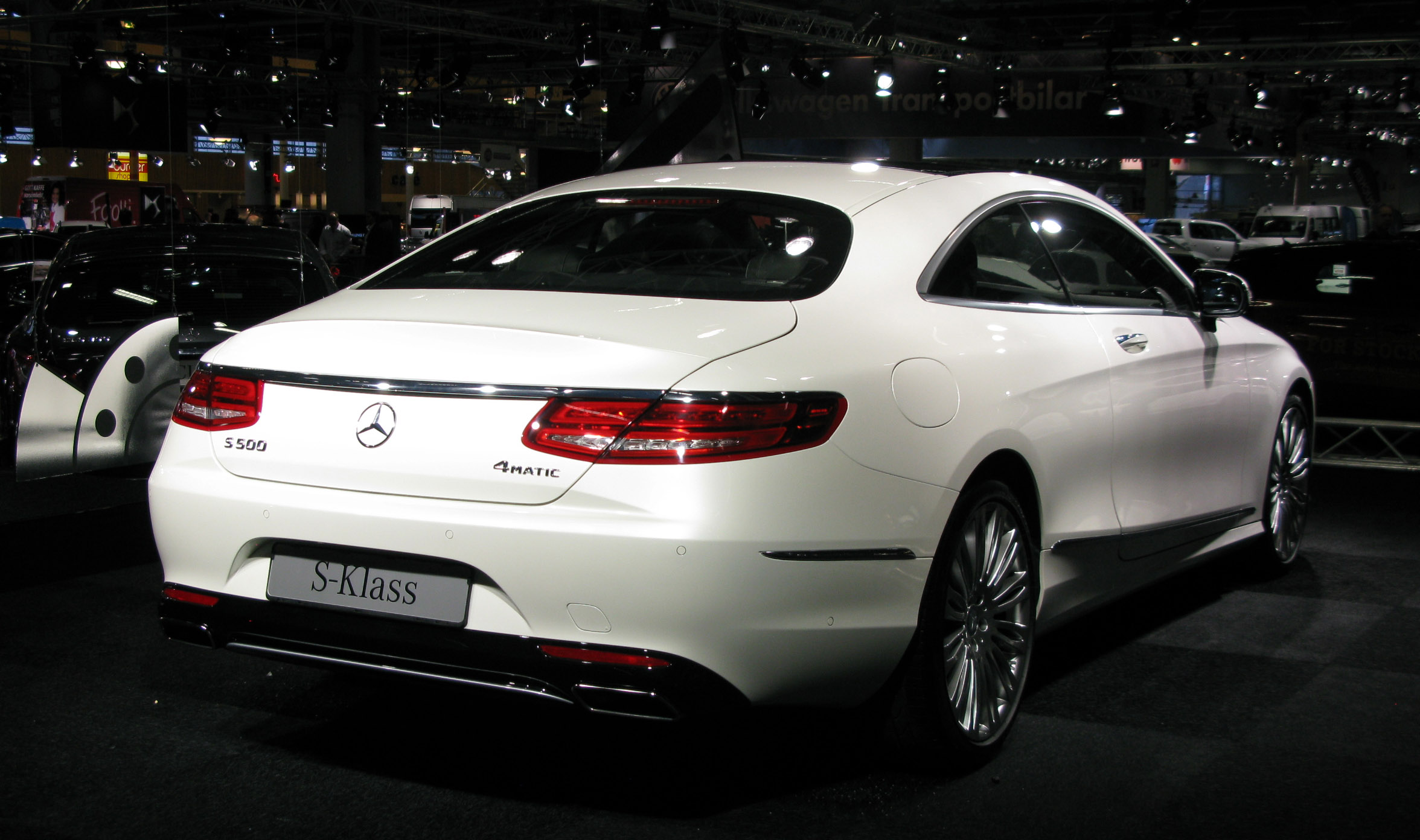
S 500 Coupé

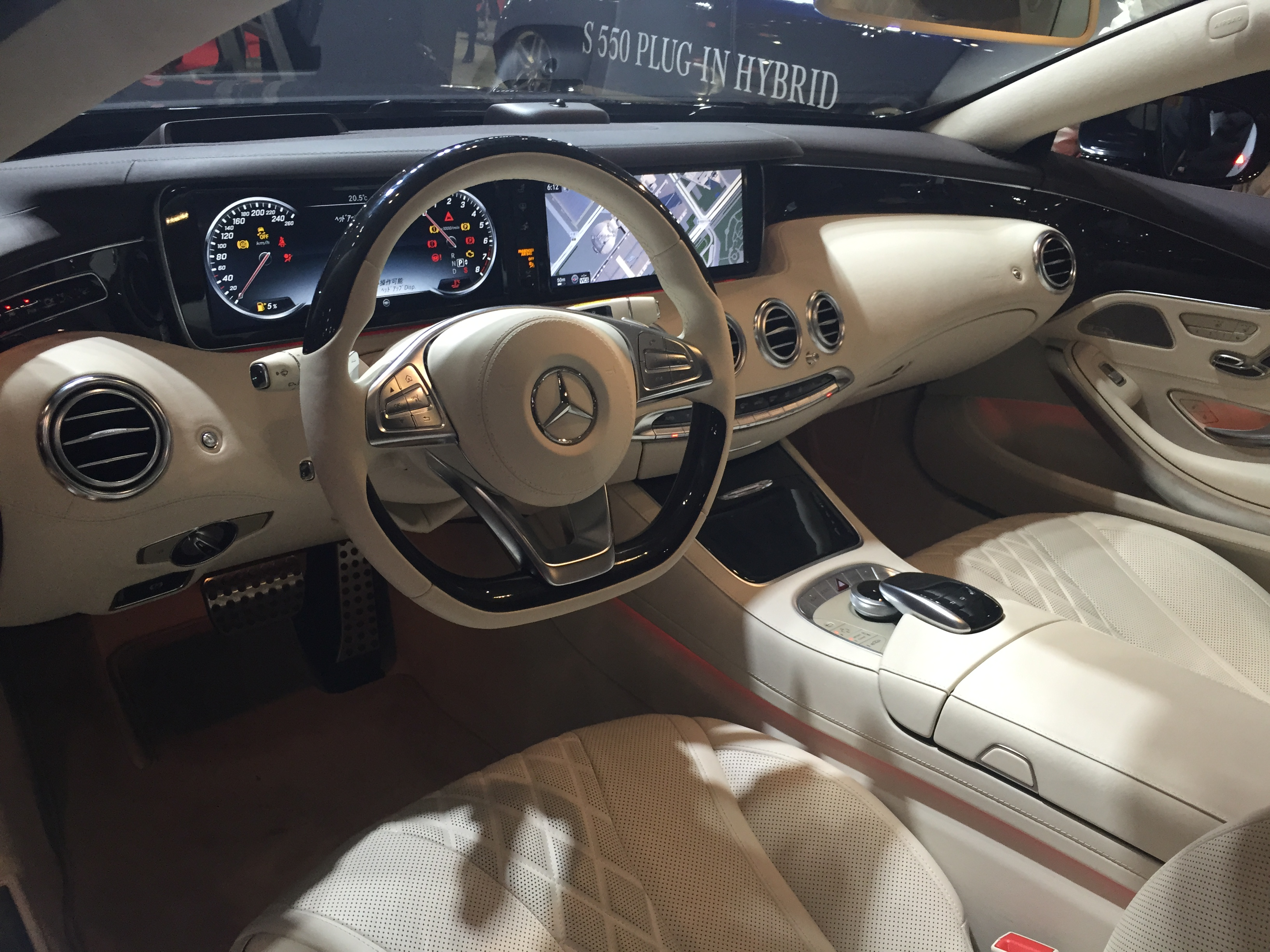
Interior of a S550 4Matic Coupé

=== S 63 AMG ===
Through the Mercedes-AMG sub-brand, the second S-Class coupé model launched was the S 63 AMG, featuring a turbocharged V8 5.5L engine for 2015-2017 and a 4.0L for 2018-2020. Like the S 500, the S 63 was offered with rear-wheel drive or all-wheel drive, though with only all-wheel drive (without Magic Body Control) in the United States.

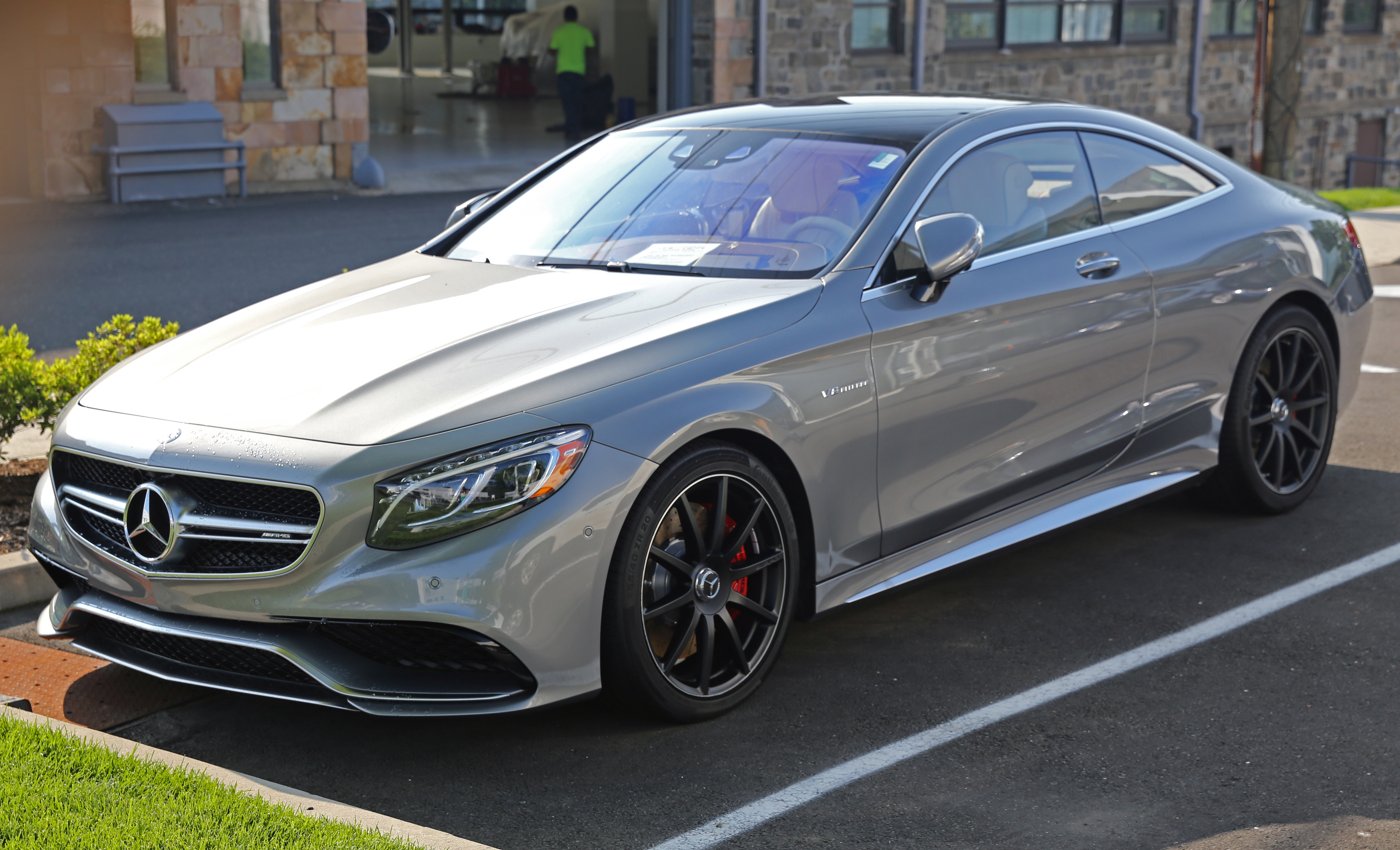
US-market S 63 AMG coupé

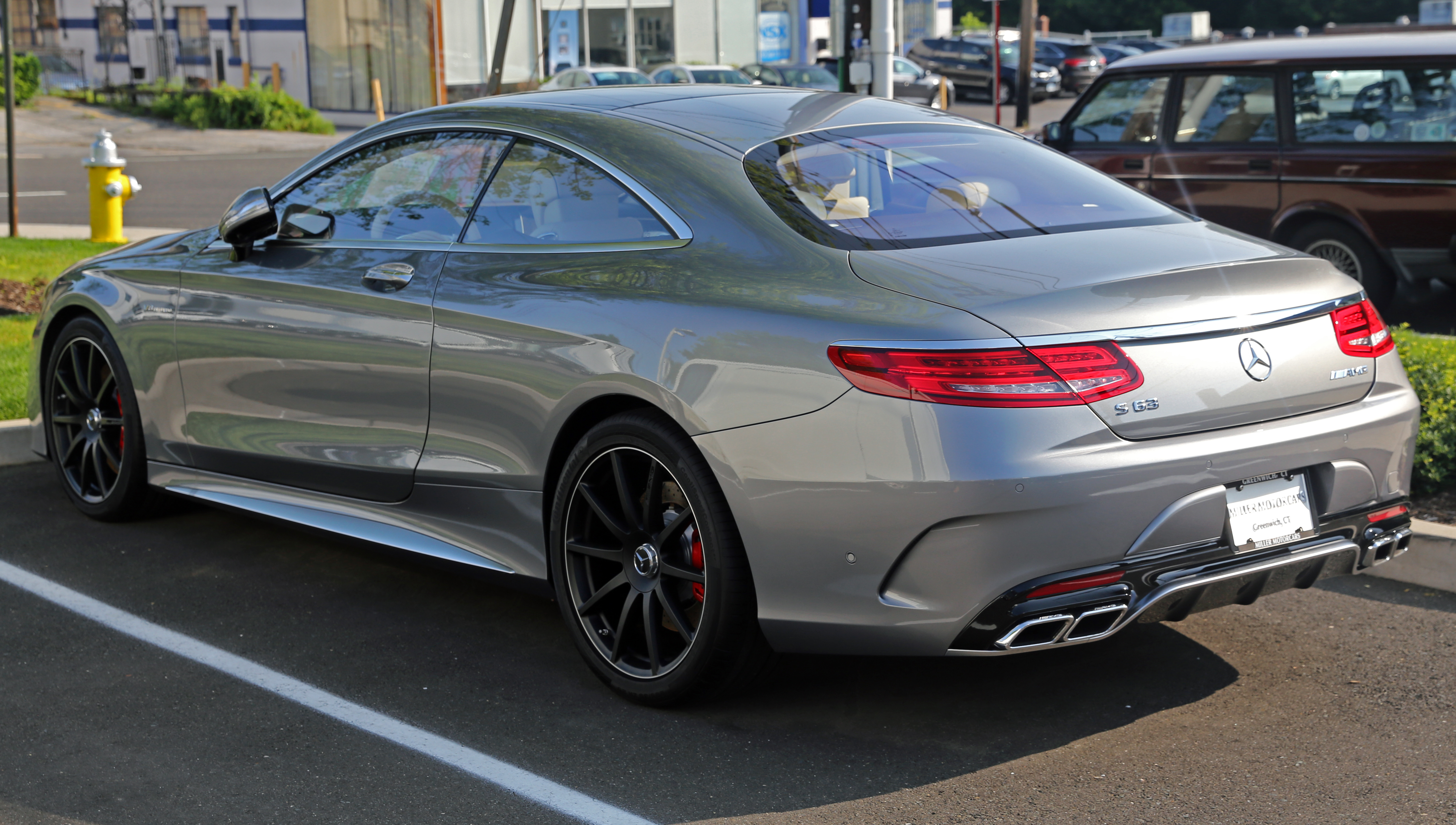
US-market S 63 AMG coupé

=== S 65 AMG ===
The S 65 AMG was the top-of-the-line S-Class coupé model. It features a 6.0L turbocharged V12 Mercedes-Benz M279 engine paired with a 7G-Tronic automatic transmission. The V12 model was available only with rear-wheel drive (4MATIC not available).

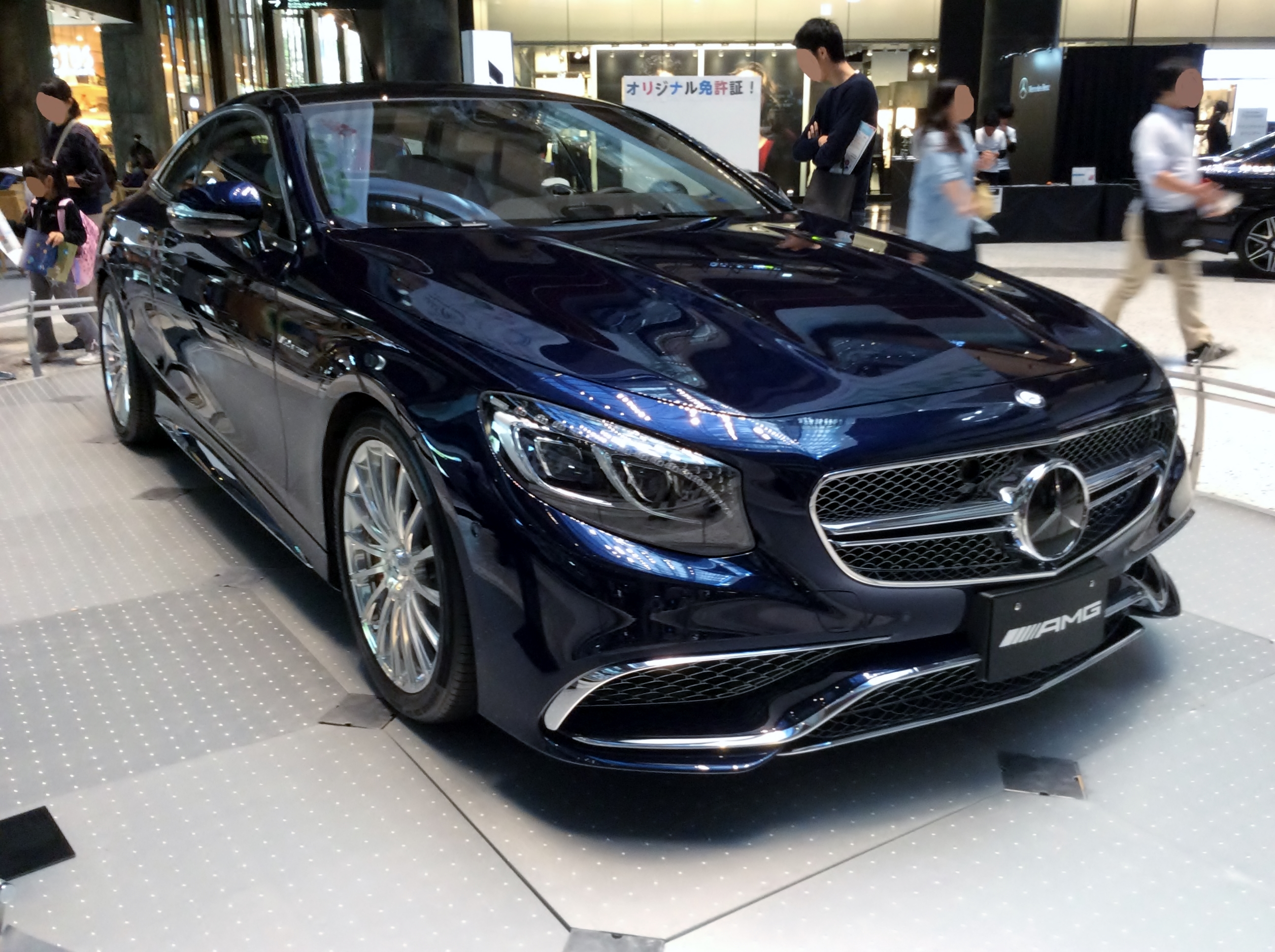
S 65 AMG

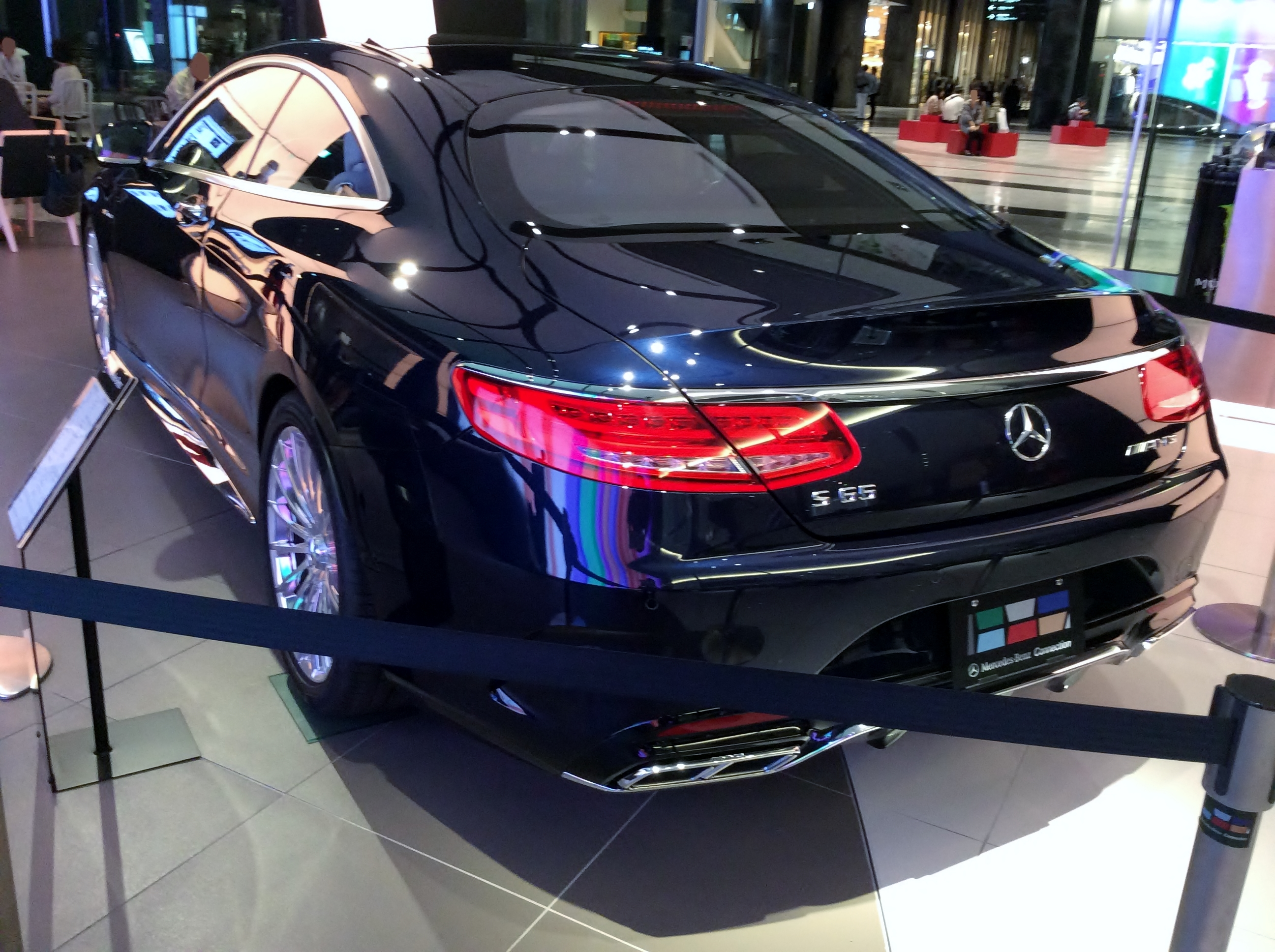
S 65 AMG

== Convertible ==
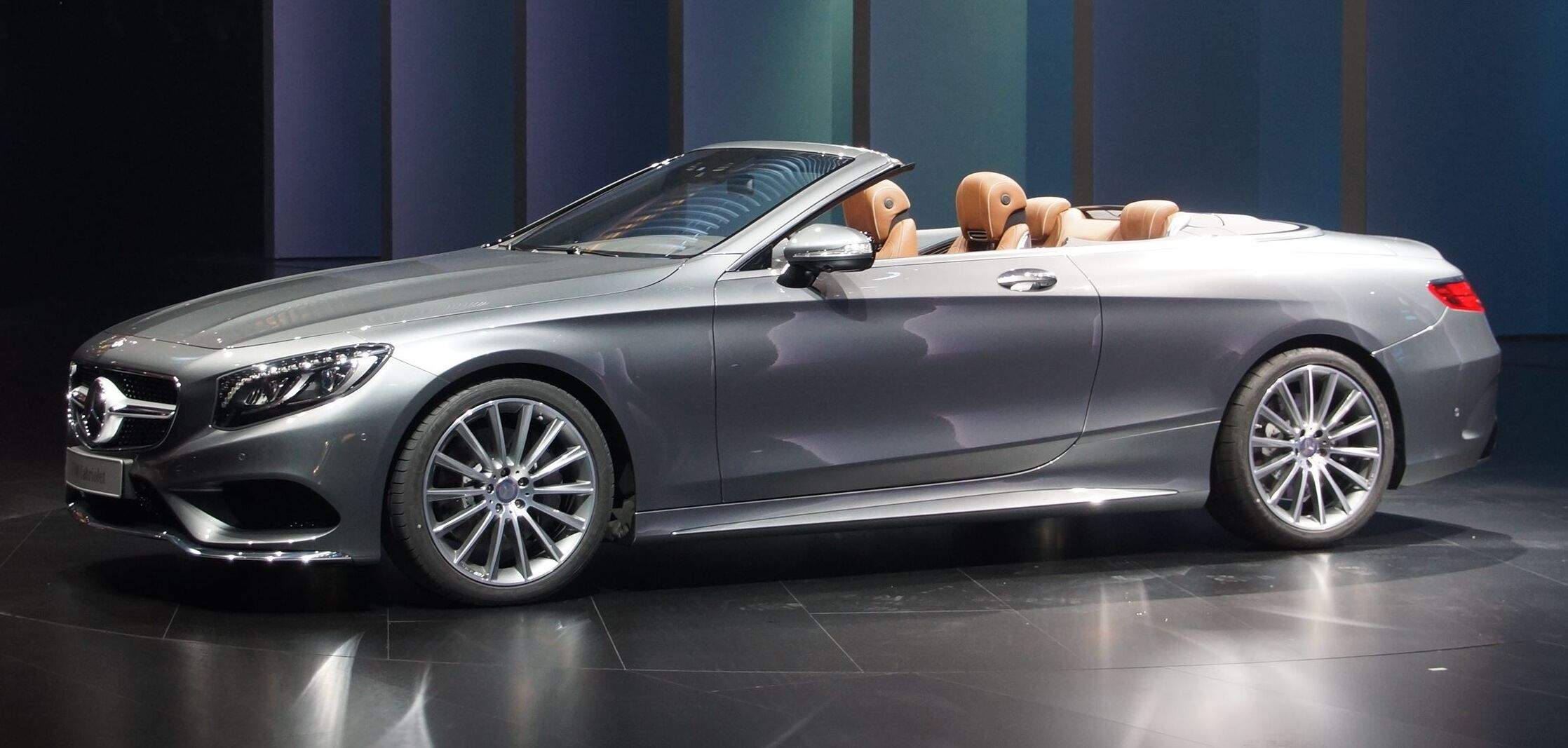
The S-Class Convertible at the IAA 2015.

The convertible version of the S-Class (codenamed A217), which was unveiled at the International Motor Show Germany in 2015, has many lightweight reinforcements such that its driving style is similar to that of the coupé version. Safety is maintained by a roll-over system, which is pyrotechnically actuated behind the rear passengers if required. It is the first factory produced 4-seater convertible S-Class Mercedes since 1971.

=== Maybach S 650 Cabriolet ===
Based on the convertible version of the AMG S 65, the Maybach S 650 Cabriolet was produced in a limited run of 300 units, each priced at $335,000, or €273,000 without tax.

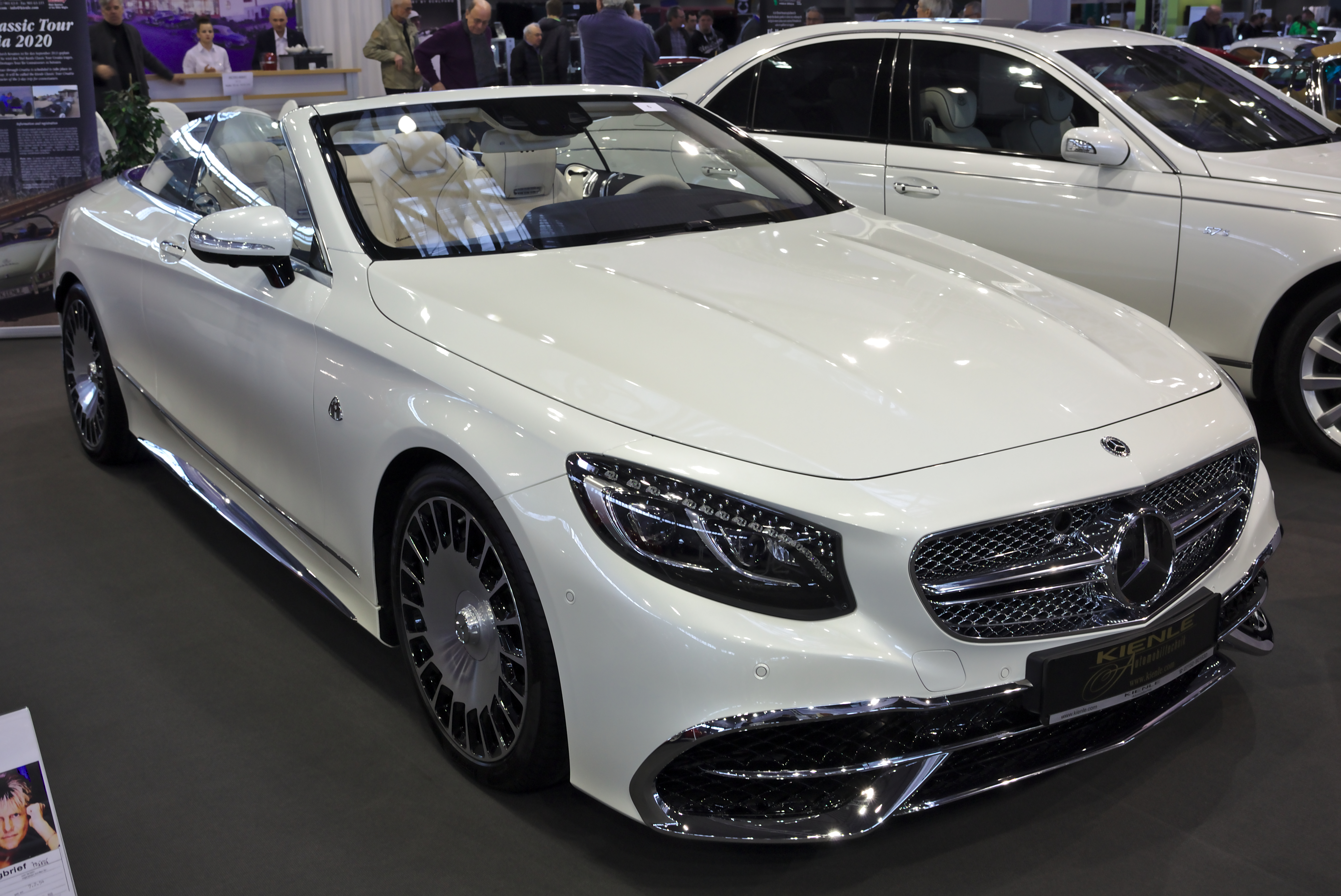
Maybach S 650 Cabriolet

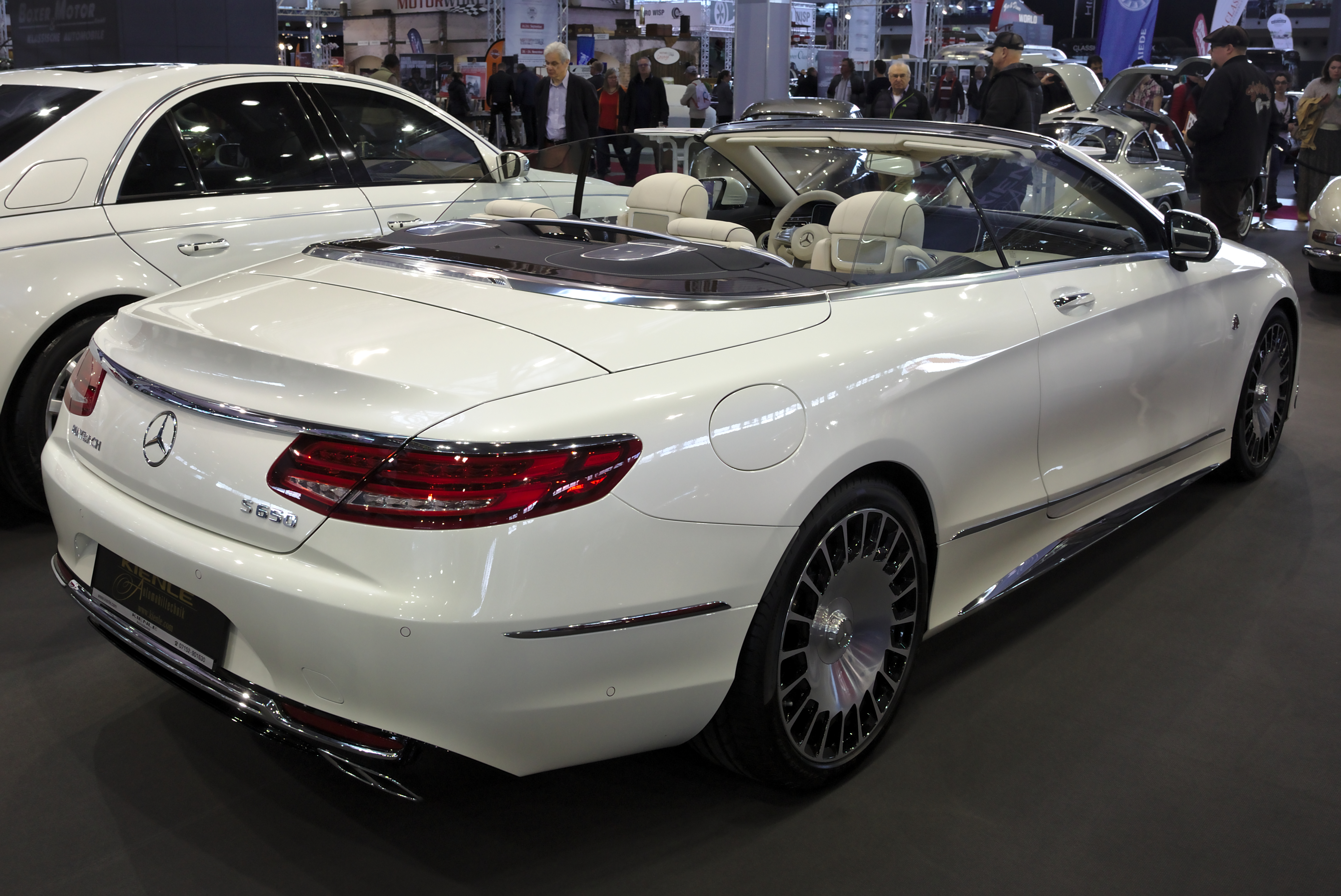
Maybach S 650 Cabriolet
