= Infiniti Q =

The Infiniti Q is a sedan manufactured by Nissan's Infiniti luxury brand, and can refer to:

- Infiniti Q30 (2015–2019)
- Infiniti Q40 (2015)
- Infiniti Q45 (1989–2006)
- Infiniti Q50 (2014–2024)
- Infiniti Q60 (2017–2022)
- Infiniti Q70 (2013–2019)

== Gallery ==
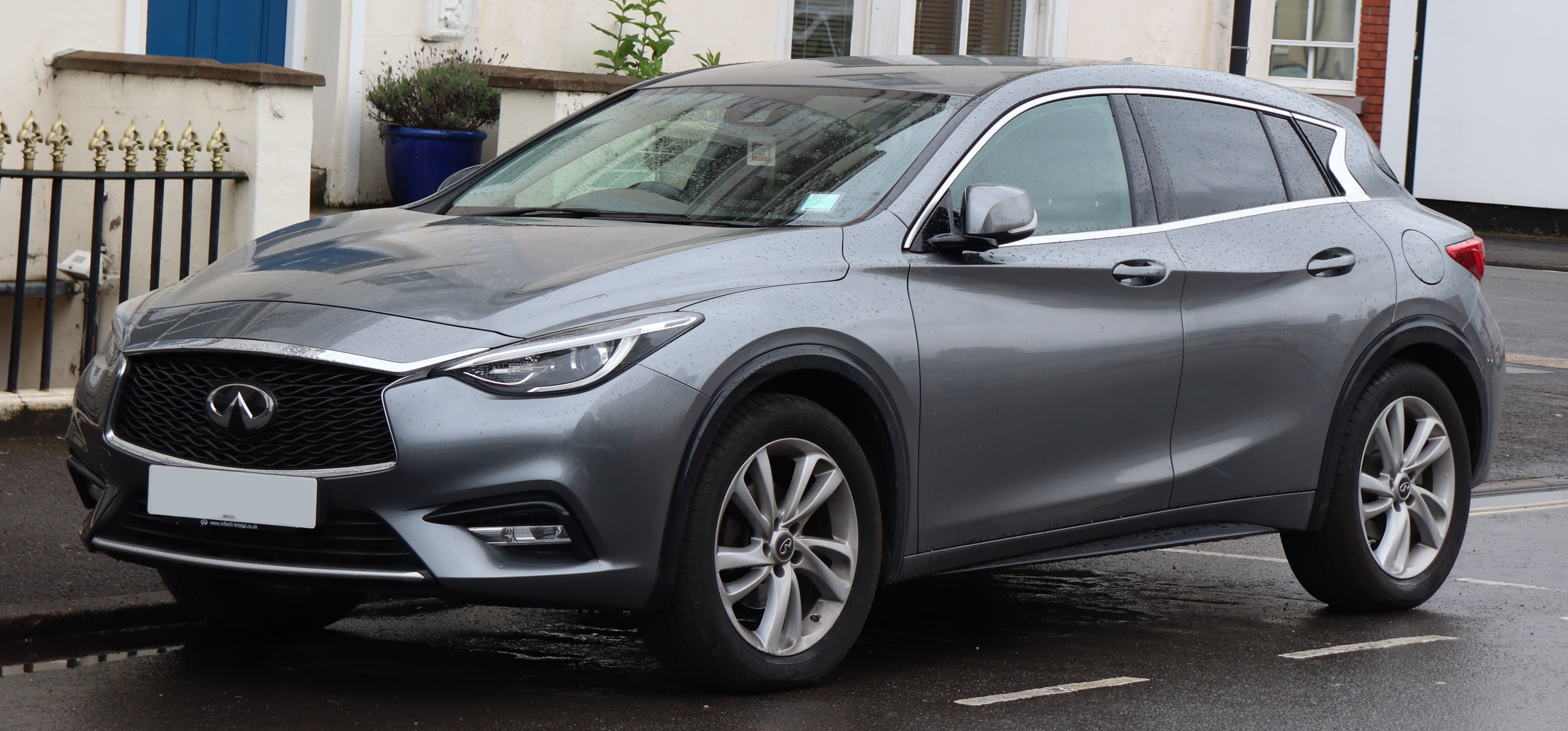
Infiniti Q30

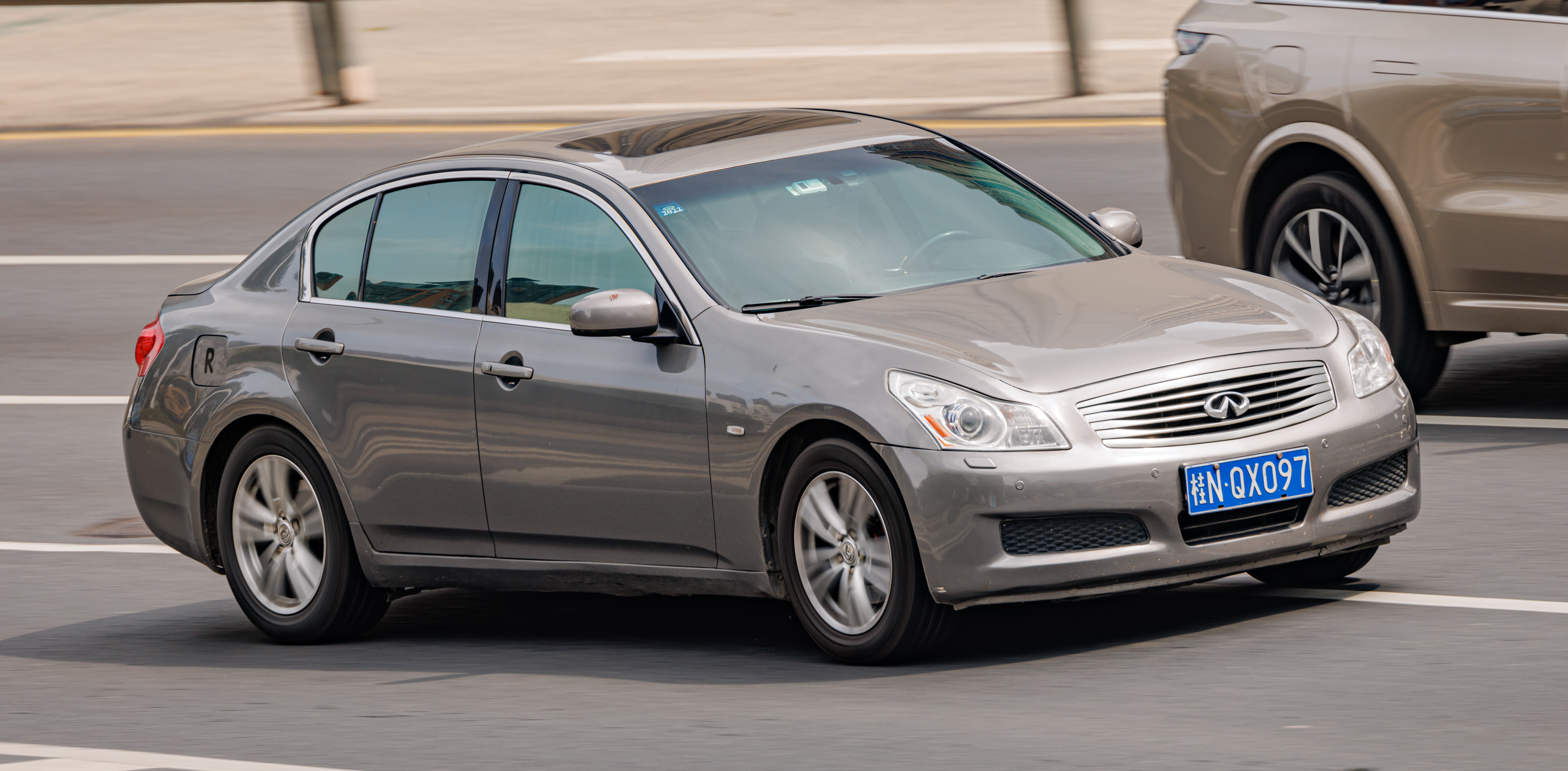
Infiniti Q40

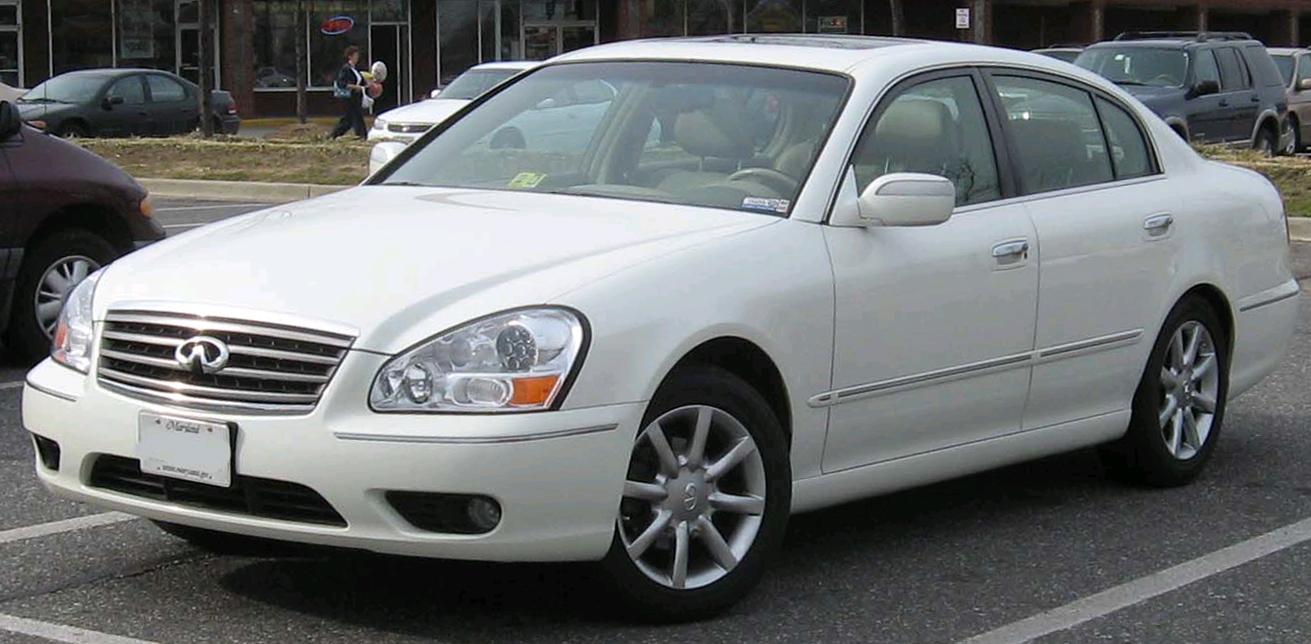
Infiniti Q45

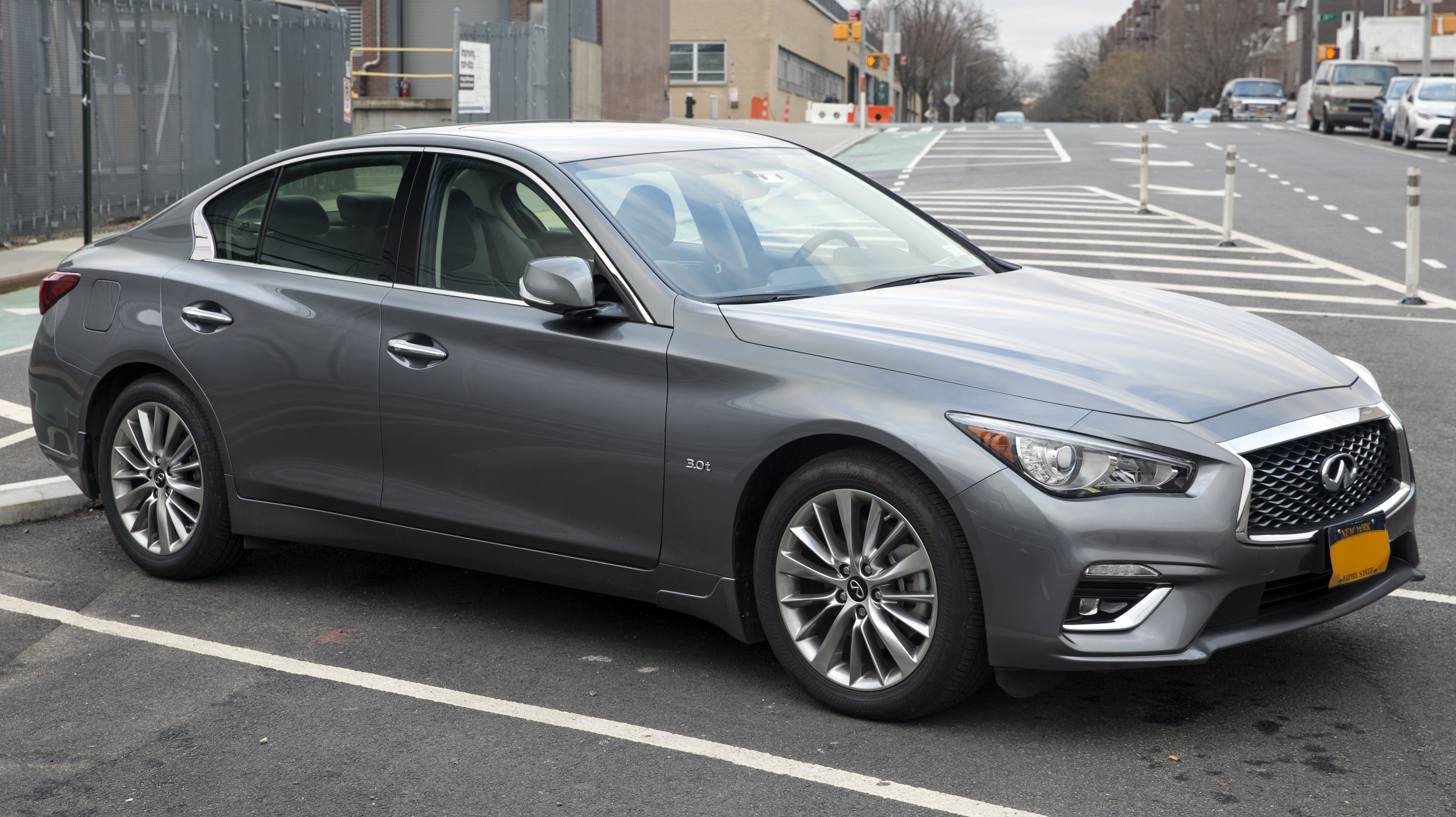
Infiniti Q50

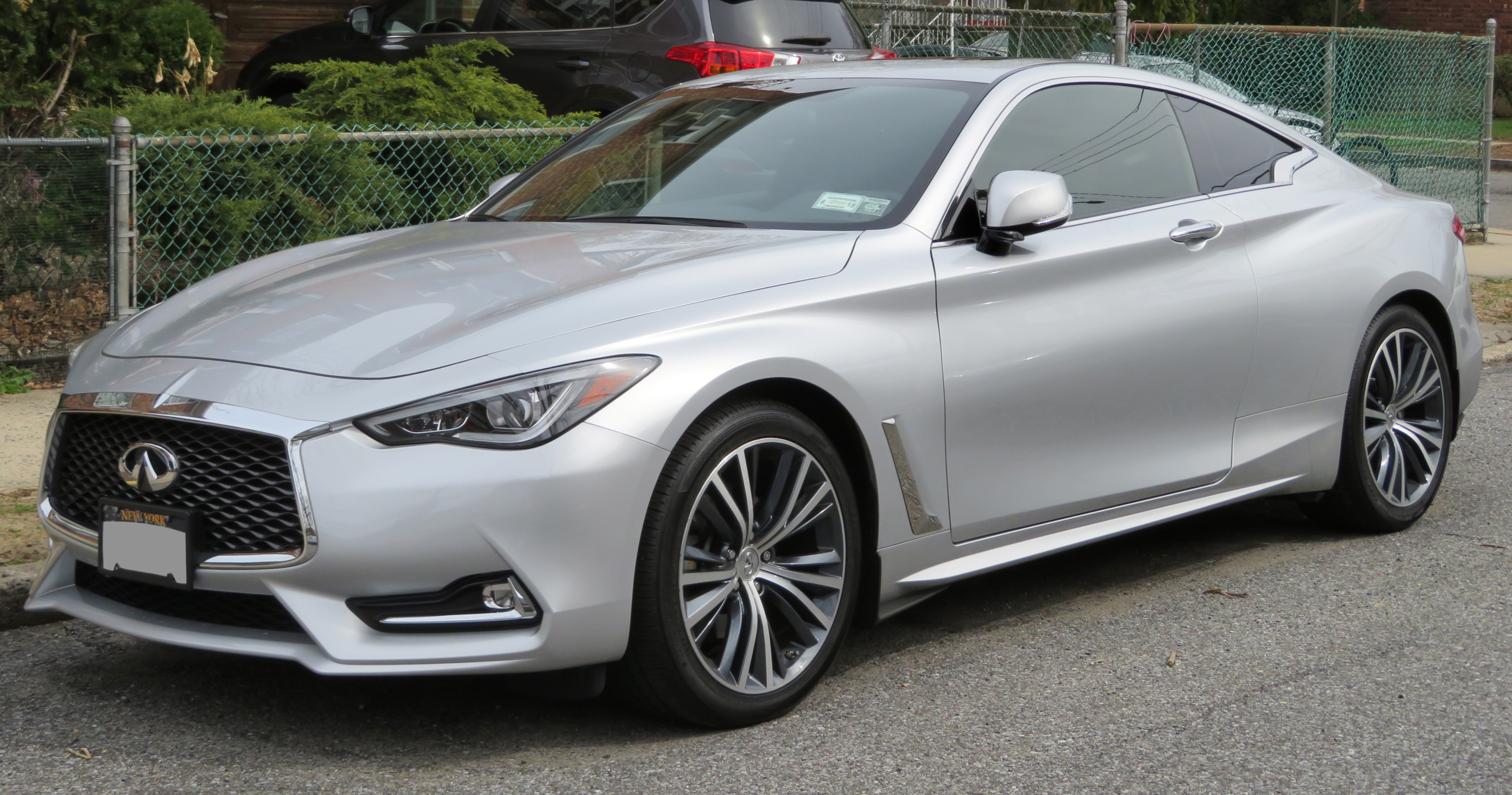
Infiniti Q60

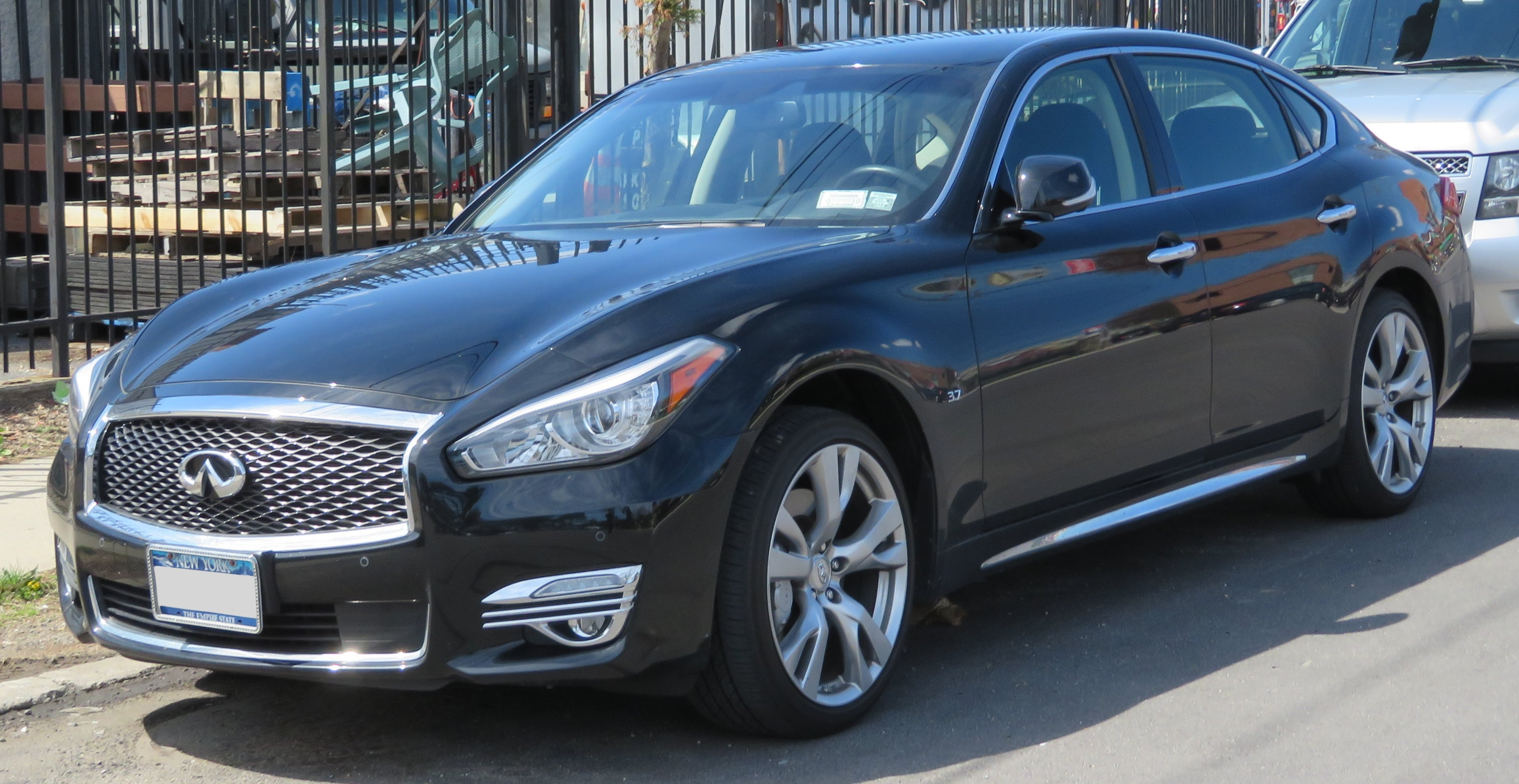
Infiniti Q70
