= Wrong-way driving =

Driving a motor vehicle against the direction of traffic

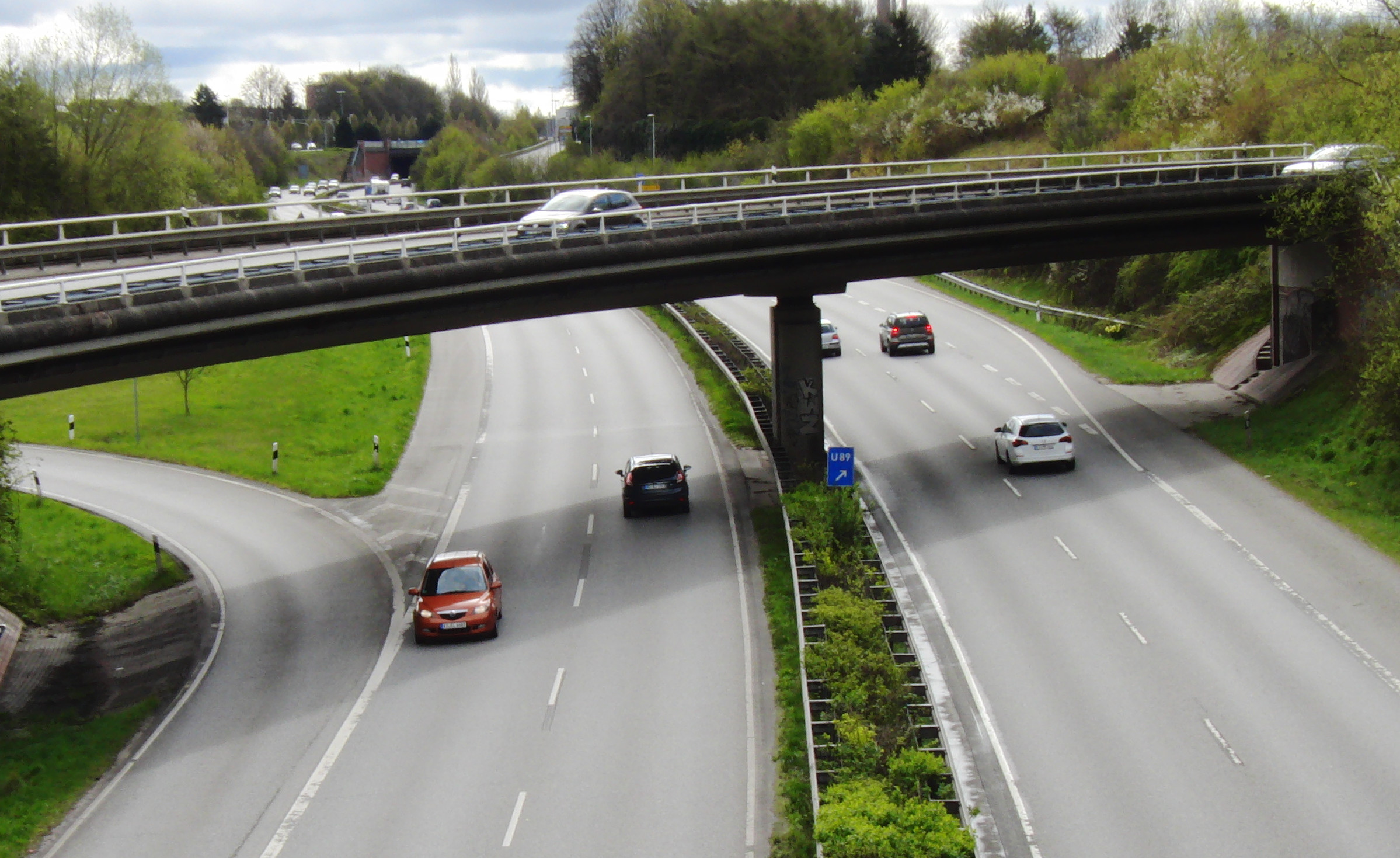
Wrong-way driver in Germany (2017, at center)

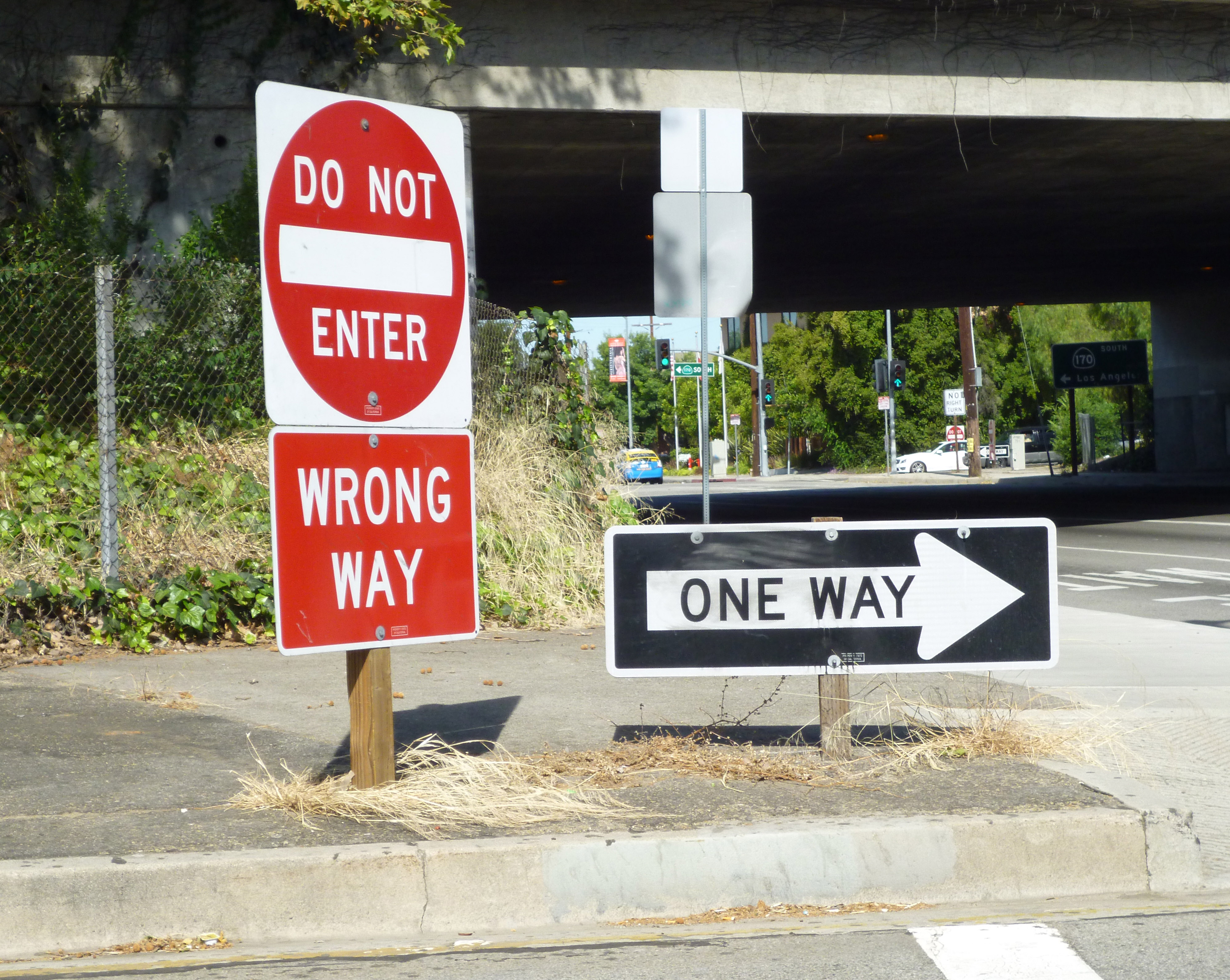
Many jurisdictions display "Wrong Way" signs at freeway off-ramps to discourage wrong-way driving. Sometimes they are combined on freeway off-ramps with "Do Not Enter" and "One Way" signs.

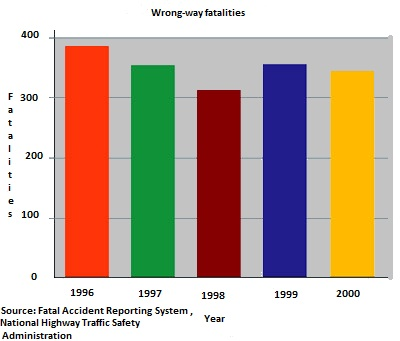
Fatalities caused by wrong-way driving in the United States, from 1996 to 2000

Wrong-way driving (WWD), also known as contraflow driving, is the act of driving a motor vehicle against the direction of traffic. It can occur on either one- or two-way roads, as well as in parking lots and parking garages, and may be due to driver inattention or impairment, or because of insufficient or confusing road markings or signage, or a driver from a right-hand traffic country being unaccustomed to driving in a left-hand traffic country and vice versa. People intentionally drive in the wrong direction because they missed an exit, for thrill-seeking, or as a shortcut.

Wrong-way driving is particularly dangerous on a divided highway, especially a freeway; the higher speeds typical of such roads mean that wrong-way driving very often leads to a head-on collision. It is also evidenced by a number of videos that have been posted on the Internet showing the exact moment of wrong-way driving and subsequent head-on collisions. In the United States, about 355 people are killed each year in crashes caused by drivers headed in the wrong direction on the highway. Given an average of 265 fatal WWD crashes, 1.34 fatalities per WWD fatal crash can be calculated. The significance of this kind of crash is corroborated when this number is compared to the fatalities per fatal crash rate of 1.10 for all other crash types, which translates to 24 more fatalities per 100 fatal crashes for WWD crashes than for fatal crashes in general. Most drivers who enter a divided highway or ramp in the wrong direction correct themselves by turning around.

== Efforts to reduce wrong-way driving ==
One of the aims of highway engineering is to reduce wrong-way driving.

=== United States ===
==== National Transportation Safety Board's Highway Special Investigation Report ====
The National Transportation Safety Board (NTSB) has published a special investigation report about wrong-way driving, in which relevant safety countermeasures to prevent wrong-way collisions on high-speed, divided highways are identified. One important part of this report is Section 4 which provides recommendations for different agencies, including Federal Highway Administration and NHTSA, to address wrong-way collisions.

=== New Zealand ===
The Auckland Motorway Alliance has its own concept of reduce wrong-way driving, in which the traffic signals modification replaces the solid round green light with a green arrow in places where a turn is banned. As a result, this allows the removal of signs banning turns, reducing clutter. In march 2018, the Auckland Motorway Alliance won the New Zealand's 3M Traffic Safety Innovation Award for 2018.

== Warnings ==
In 2010, an advanced driver-assistance system was introduced to prevent wrong-way driving.

In 2010, Nissan developed a GPS-enabled warning system to alert drivers travelling in the wrong direction on motorways. The first application is the Nissan Fuga hybrid luxury sedan. The system, uses GPS positioning data, map data and vehicle speed data to determine if the vehicle is travelling against the flow of traffic. The system identifies an area for determining the normal direction of flow, such as around junctions. When the vehicle passes through that area, the system records its direction of travel. If the vehicle enters that area again and the system determines that it's driving in the opposite direction it provides audible and visual warnings.

In 2011, Toyota introduced Wrong-Way Driving Alert incorporated into navigation systems. The function monitors vehicle direction on highways and selected toll roads, including at tollgates, service area ramps, turn-offs and junctions. The new function was made possible by advances in communications-based map-updating technology and in pinpoint position-recognition technology that uses information from GPS, gyro, vehicle-speed and other sensors to determine accurate vehicle movement.

In 2013 Mercedes-Benz introduced wrong-way driver warning function on the Mercedes-Benz S-Class (W222).
