= Mercedes-Benz S-Class (W222) =

Sixth generation of Mercedes-Benz S-Class

Mercedes-Benz S (W222)
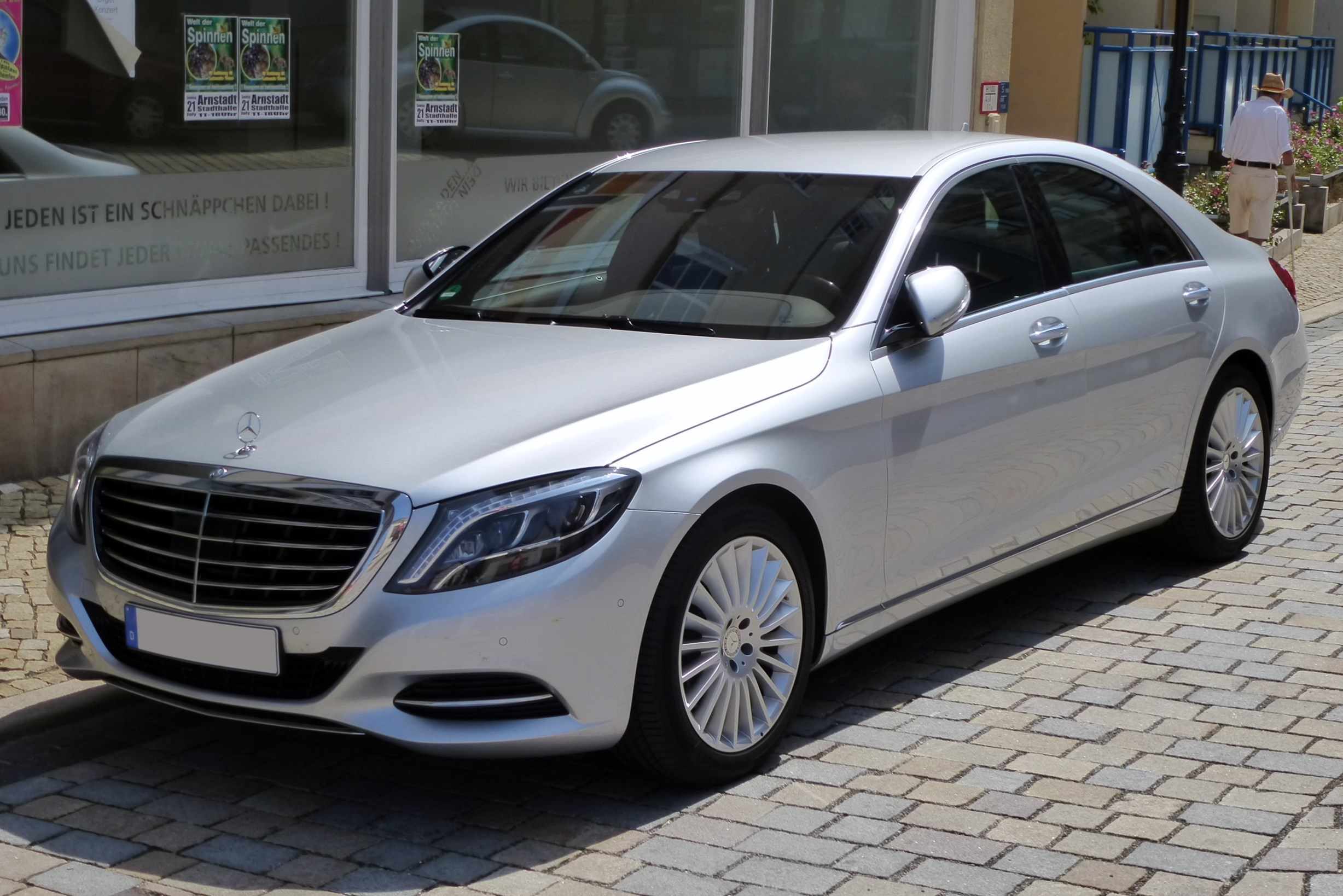

Overview
- Manufacturer: Daimler AG
- Production: 12 June 2013– September 2020
- Model years: 2014–2020
- Assembly: Germany: Sindelfingen; India: Pune (Mercedes Benz India); Malaysia: Pekan (HICOM); Indonesia: Bogor (MBI); Thailand: Samut Prakan (TAAP); Vietnam: Ho Chi Minh City (MBV)
- Designer: Il-hun Yoon; Robert Lešnik (2009)

Body and chassis
- Class: Full-size luxury car (F)
- Body style: 4-door saloon
- Layout: Front-engine, rear-wheel-drive; Front-engine, all-wheel-drive (4MATIC)
- Platform: W221/W222
- Related: Mercedes-Benz S-Class (C217)

Powertrain
- Engine: Petrol engines: 2.0 L M264 turbo I4 (China); 3.0 L M256 turbo I6; 3.0 L M276 twin-turbo V6; 3.5 L M276 V6 + electric motor; 4.7 L M278 twin-turbo V8; 3.0 L M276 twin-turbo V6 Plug-in Hybrid + electric motor; 4.0 L M176/M177 twin-turbo V8; 5.5 L M157 twin-turbo V8; 6.0 L M277/279 twin-turbo V12; Diesel engines: 2.2 L OM651 twin turbo I4 Bluetec Hybrid; 2.9 L OM656 twin-turbo I6; 3.0 L OM642 turbo V6
- Transmission: 7-speed 7G-Tronic automatic 9-speed 9G-Tronic automatic
- Hybrid drivetrain: FHEV (Parallel Hybrid) (S400 Hybrid, S300 Bluetec Hybrid); Mild Hybrid (EQ Boost); Plug-in hybrid (S 500 e / S 560 e)

Dimensions
- Wheelbase: SWB: 3,035 mm (119.5 in); LWB: 3,165 mm (124.6 in); Maybach: 3,365 mm (132.5 in); Pullman: 4,418 mm (173.9 in)
- Length: SWB: 5,146 mm (202.6 in); LWB: 5,296 mm (208.5 in); Maybach: 5,453 mm (214.7 in); Pullman: 6,499 mm (255.9 in)
- Width: 1,899 mm (74.8 in)
- Height: 1,496 mm (58.9 in); 1,598 mm (62.9 in) (Pullman)
- Curb weight: 1,910–2,275 kg (4,210–5,020 lb); 2,295–2,360 kg (5,060–5,200 lb) (Mercedes-Maybach)

Chronology
- Predecessor: Mercedes-Benz S-Class (W221); Maybach 57 and 62 (for Mercedes-Maybach S-Class, but indirect)
- Successor: Mercedes-Benz S-Class (W223)

The Mercedes-Benz W222 is the sixth generation of the Mercedes Benz S-Class; it was produced from 2013 to 2020, serving as the successor to the W221 S-Class and predecessor to the W223 S-Class. The W222 was designed in 2009 by Korean designer Il-hun Yoon, who drew inspiration from the Mercedes-Benz F700 concept car. The exterior design was developed by a team under the direction of the Slovenian car designer Robert Lešnik. The W222 has a design theme similar to the C-Class (W205) and E-Class (W213).

In Europe, sales of the S400 Hybrid, S350 BlueTEC, S350 BlueTEC Hybrid, and S500 began in September 2013; and sales of the S550 in the United States also began on that same month. The four-wheel drive (4Matic) model went on sale in November, and additional models, including V12 models and those from AMG, were released in 2014.

The W222 S-Class debuted on 15 May 2013, in Hamburg, Germany, and entered production in Sindelfingen, Germany, in June 2013.

Production of the W222 ended in September 2020 with the introduction of its successor, the S-Class (W223).

== Suspension ==
Mercedes' hydropneumatic, active suspension, known as Active Body Control, was updated with a system dubbed Magic Body Control (MBC), which is fitted with a road-sensing system ("road surface scan") that pre-scans the road for uneven surfaces, potholes, and bumps. Using a stereo camera, the system scans the road surface up to 15 meters ahead of the vehicle at speeds up to 130 km/h (81 mph), and it adjusts the shock damping at each wheel to account for imperfections in the road. As of 2017, MBC was not available on any of the 4Matic models.

== Models ==
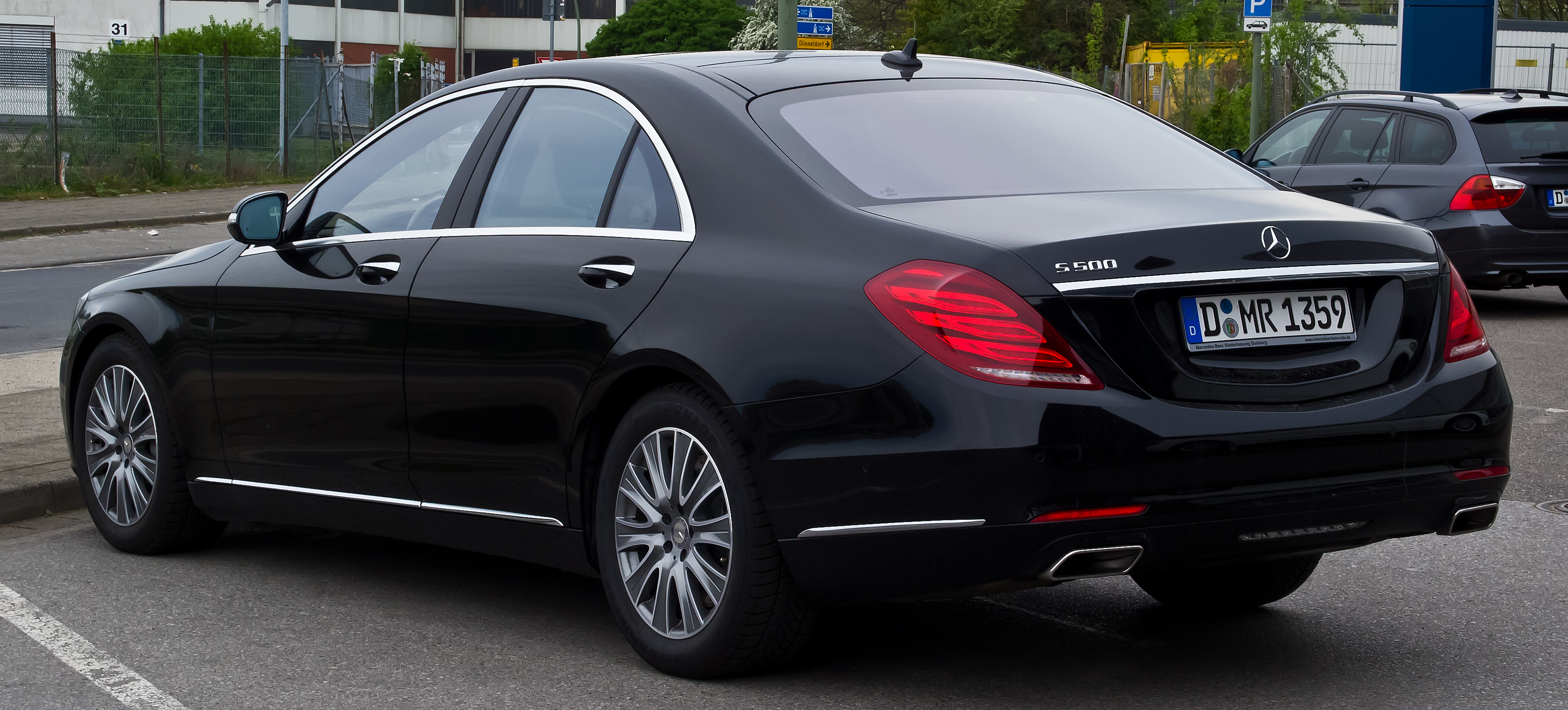
Short wheelbase

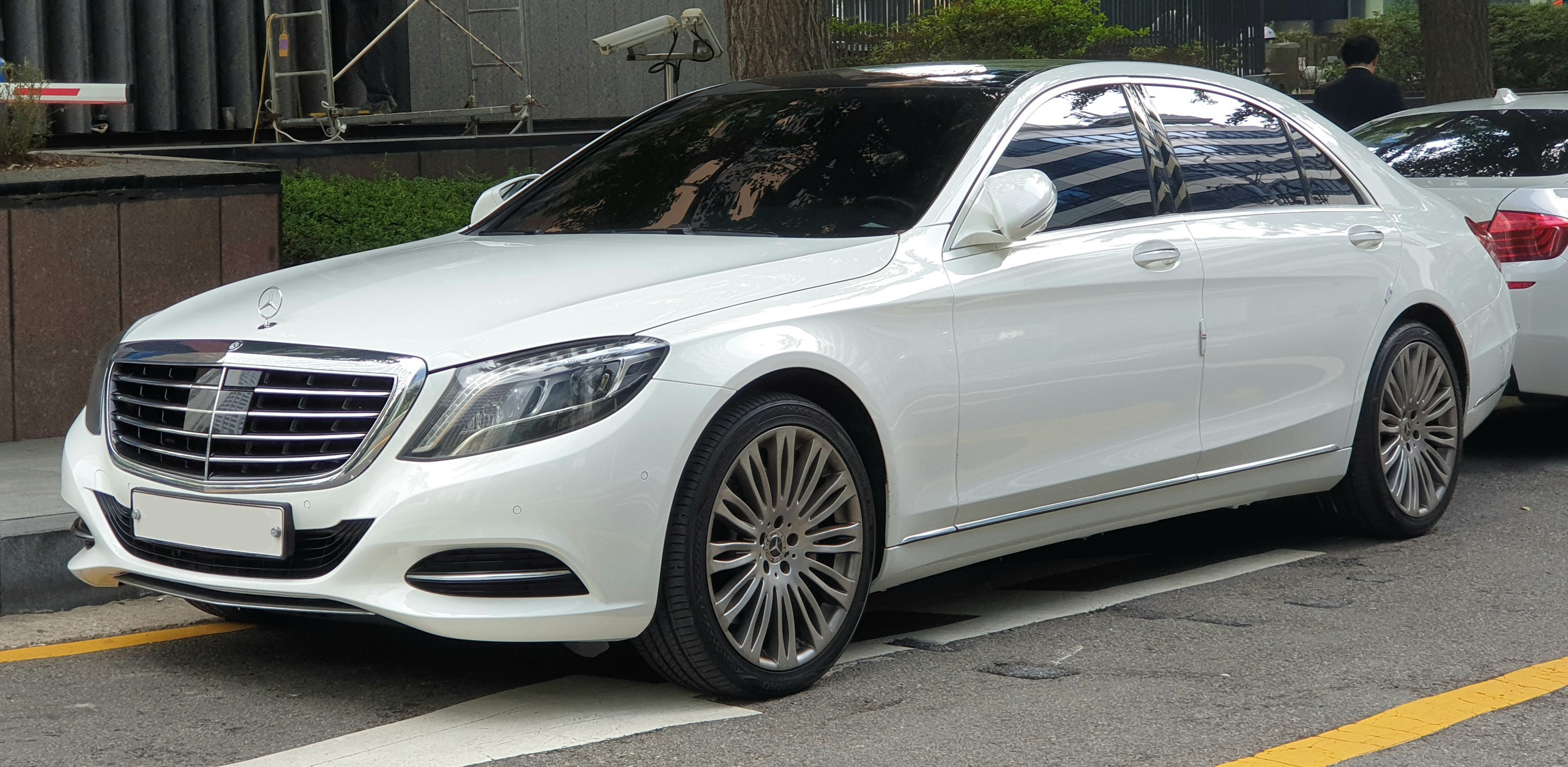

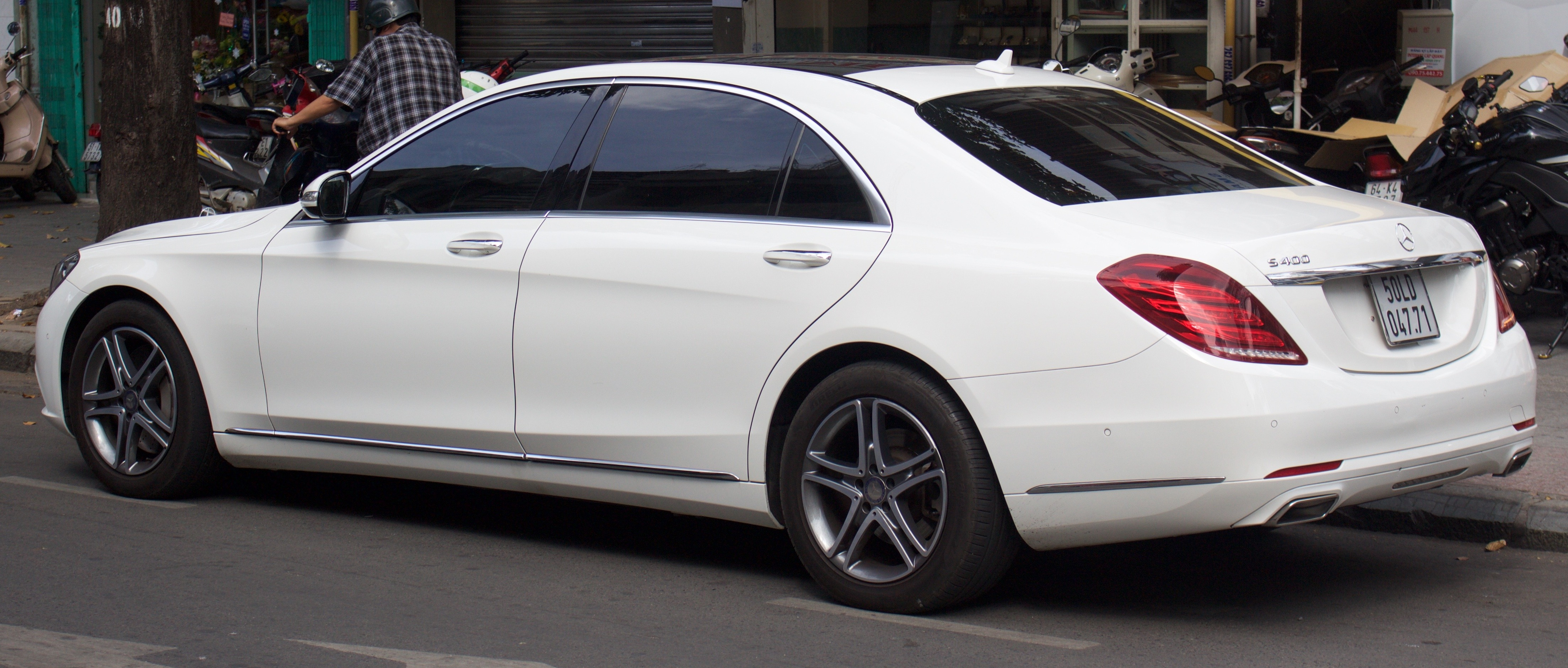
Long wheelbase

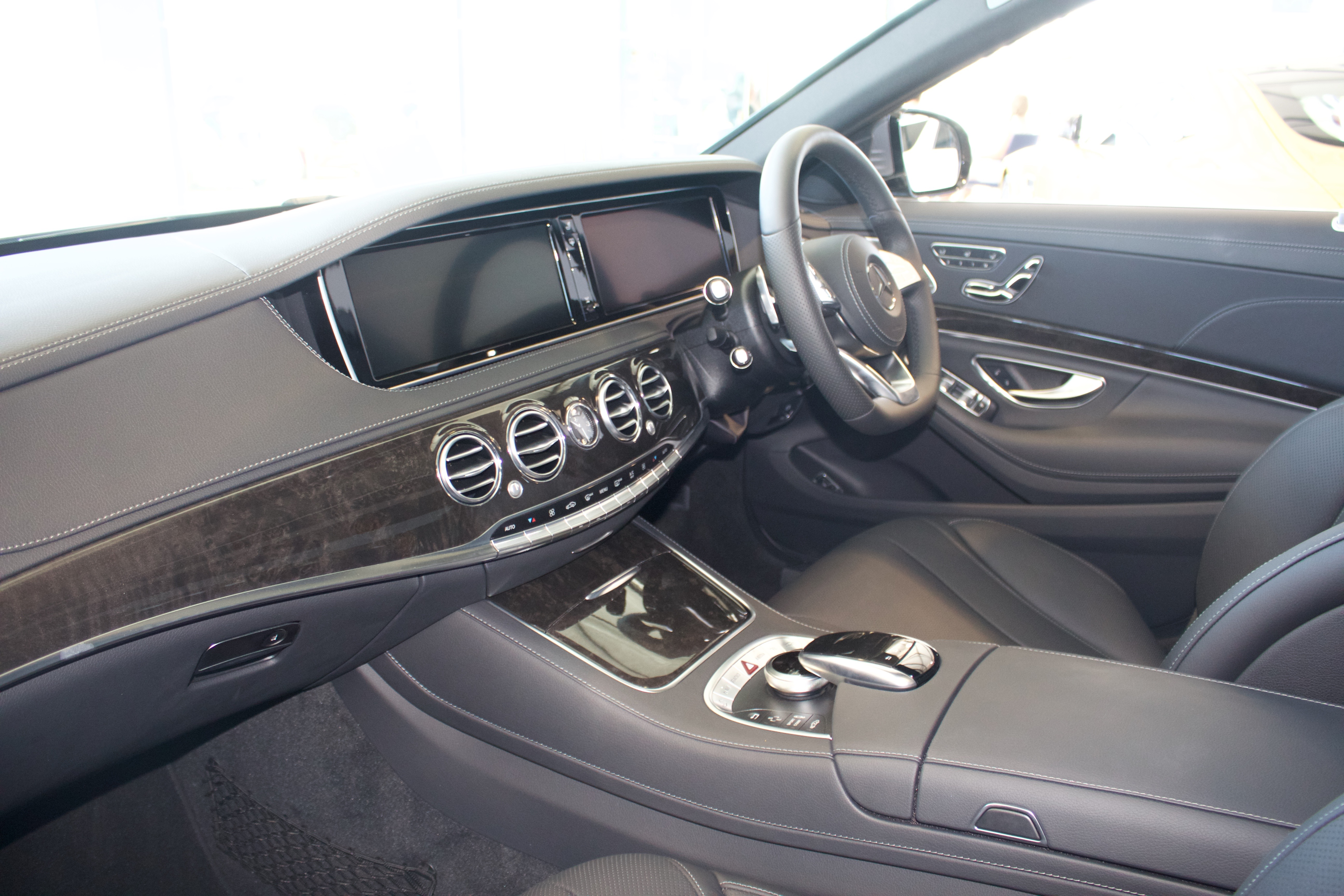
Interior

The vehicle was unveiled at Airbus in Hamburg-Finkenwerder, followed by Shanghai's Mercedes-Benz Arena, and the 2013 Osaka Motor Show (S 400 HYBRID). The new S-Class became available to order in May 2013, with official arrival at Mercedes-Benz dealers on 20 July 2013.

Early models included S 400 Hybrid, S 500, S 350 BlueTEC, followed by the S 300 BlueTEC Hybrid in early 2014.

US models went on sale for the 2014 model year; the lineup initially included only the long-wheelbase (LWB) "S550" (S500 in Europe) in September 2013, and the long-wheelbase S 550 4Matic, which arrived in November 2013. Auto Bild measured the LWB as the quietest among cars such as the Rolls-Royce Ghost and the Bentley Flying Spur in 2014.

European models went on sale at the end of July 2013, followed by China at the end of September 2013, and the US in October 2013.

Delivery in Japan began in November 2013. Early models include the S 400 Hybrid (right-hand-drive), S 400 Hybrid Exclusive (right steering), S 550 LWB (left/right steering), S 63 AMG LWB (right steering), S 63 AMG 4Matic LWB (left-hand-drive). The S 300 BlueTEC HYBRID, S 350 BlueTEC 4MATIC, S 600, and S 65 AMG Saloon arrived at dealer showrooms in March 2014.

There is also the "S500 Intelligent Drive", which is a self-driving version of the S 500 sedan, using sensors that are also available in the production version of the S-Class. The car uses the sensors to capture the massive amounts of data in traffic. The vehicle was officially unveiled at the 2013 Frankfurt Motor Show.

=== S 63 AMG, S 63 AMG 4MATIC (2013–2020) ===
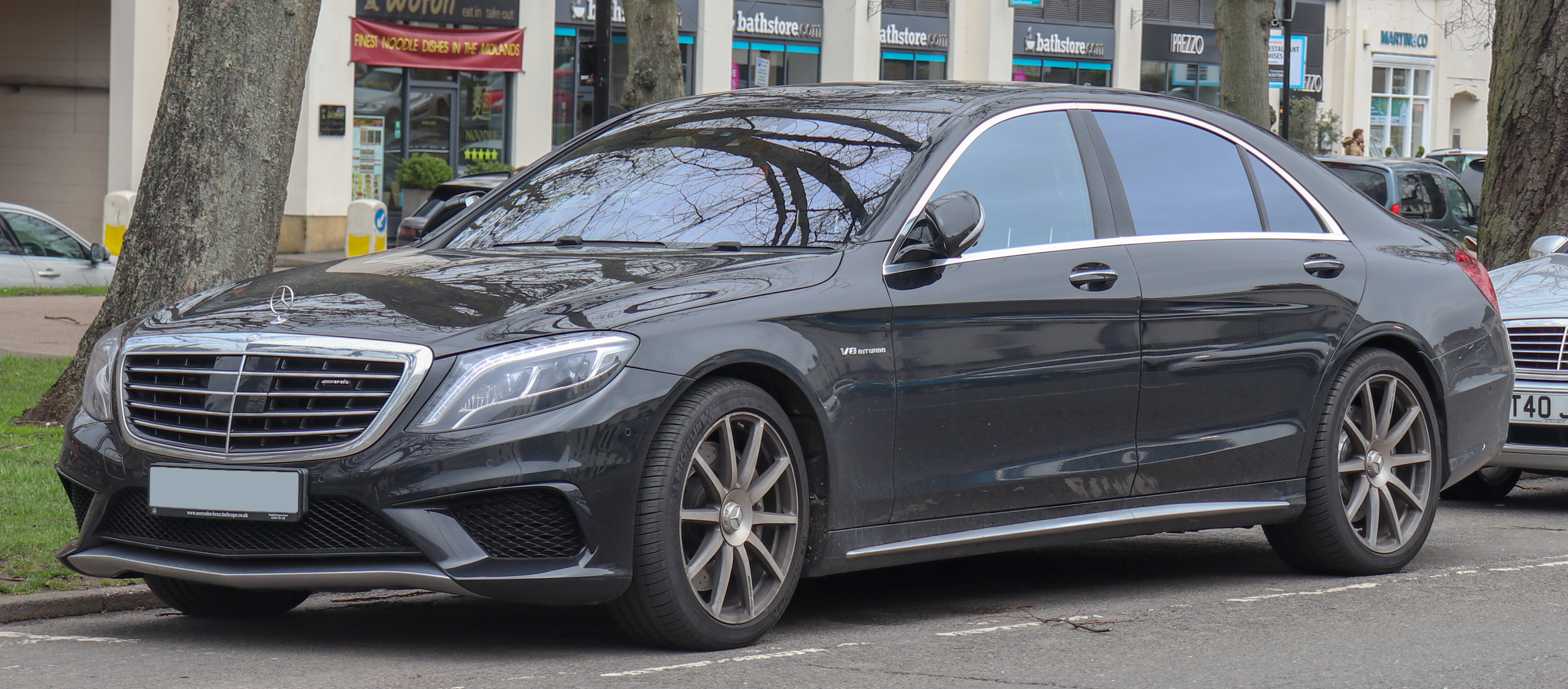

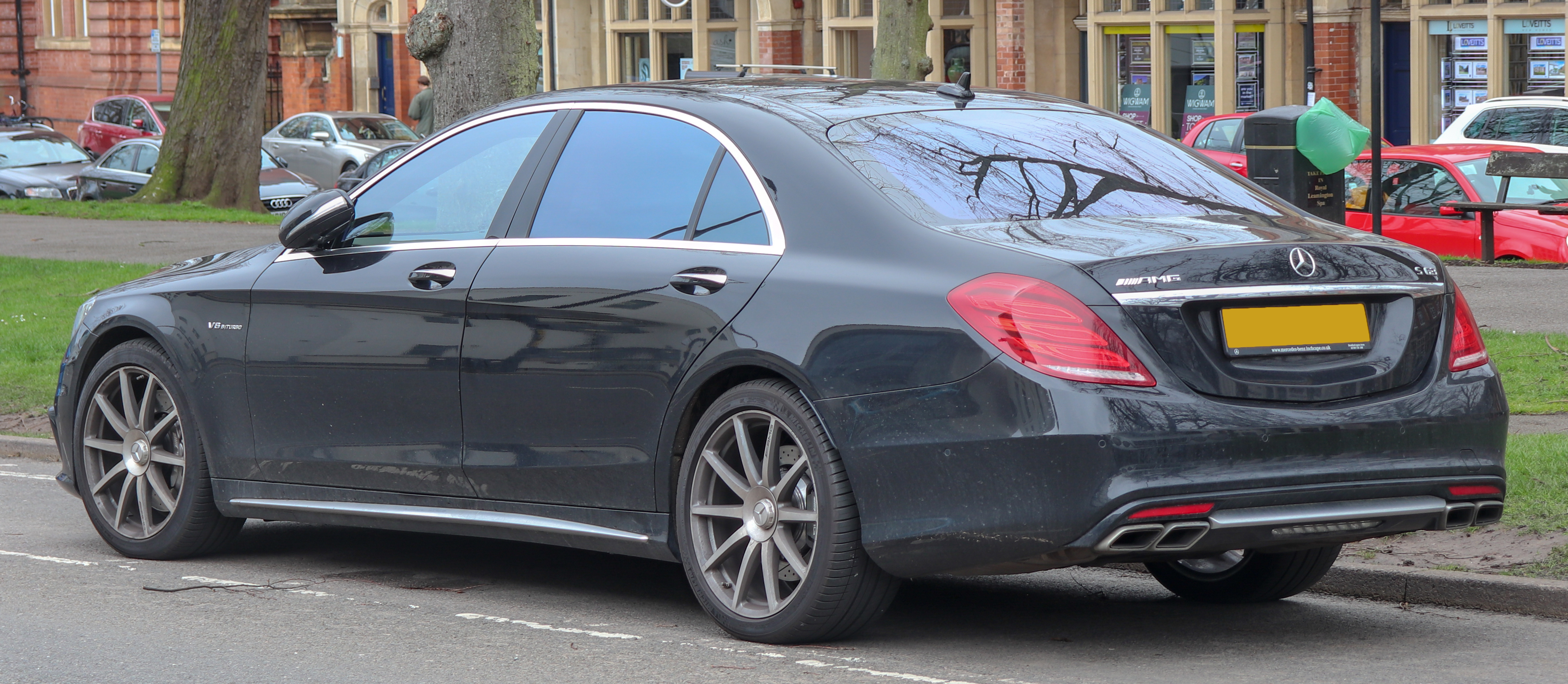
Mercedes-Benz S 63 AMG (W222)

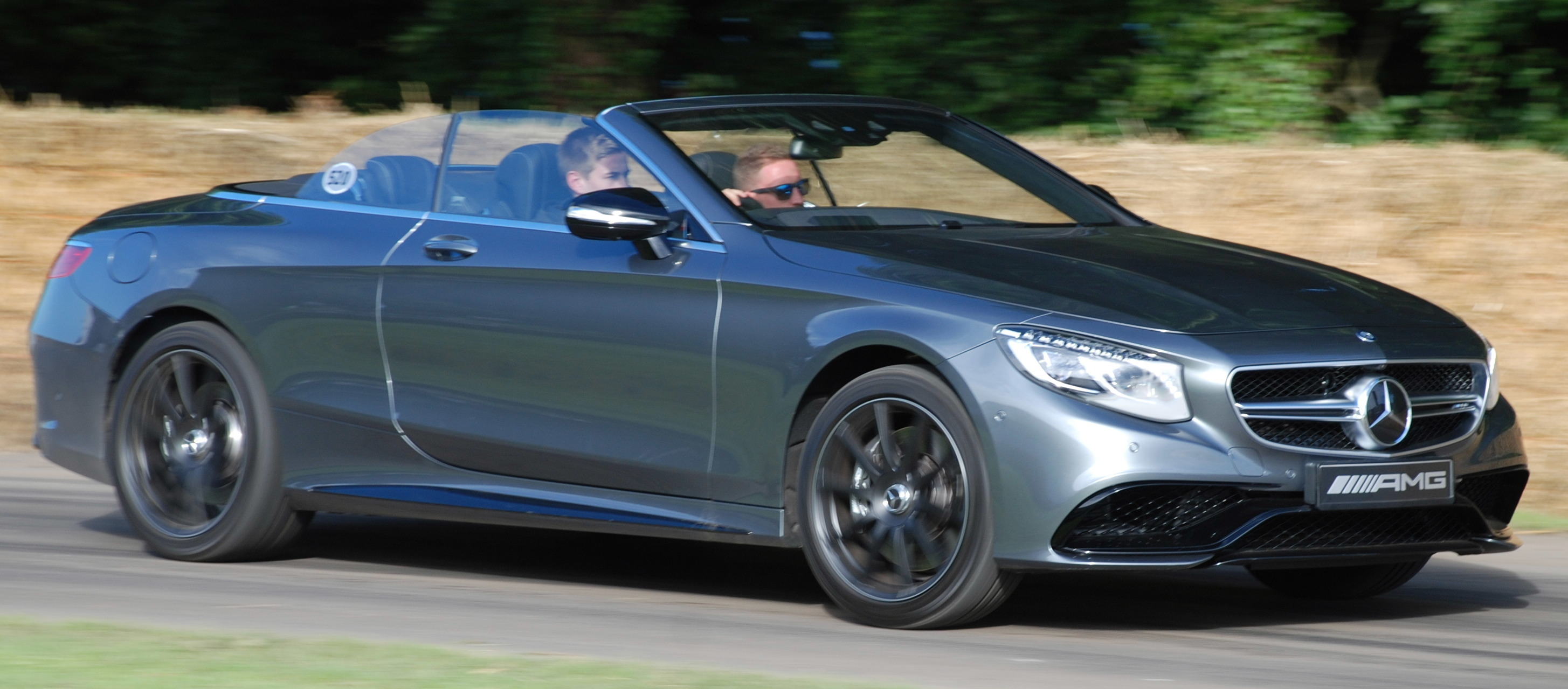
Mercedes-Benz S 63 AMG cabriolet (UK)

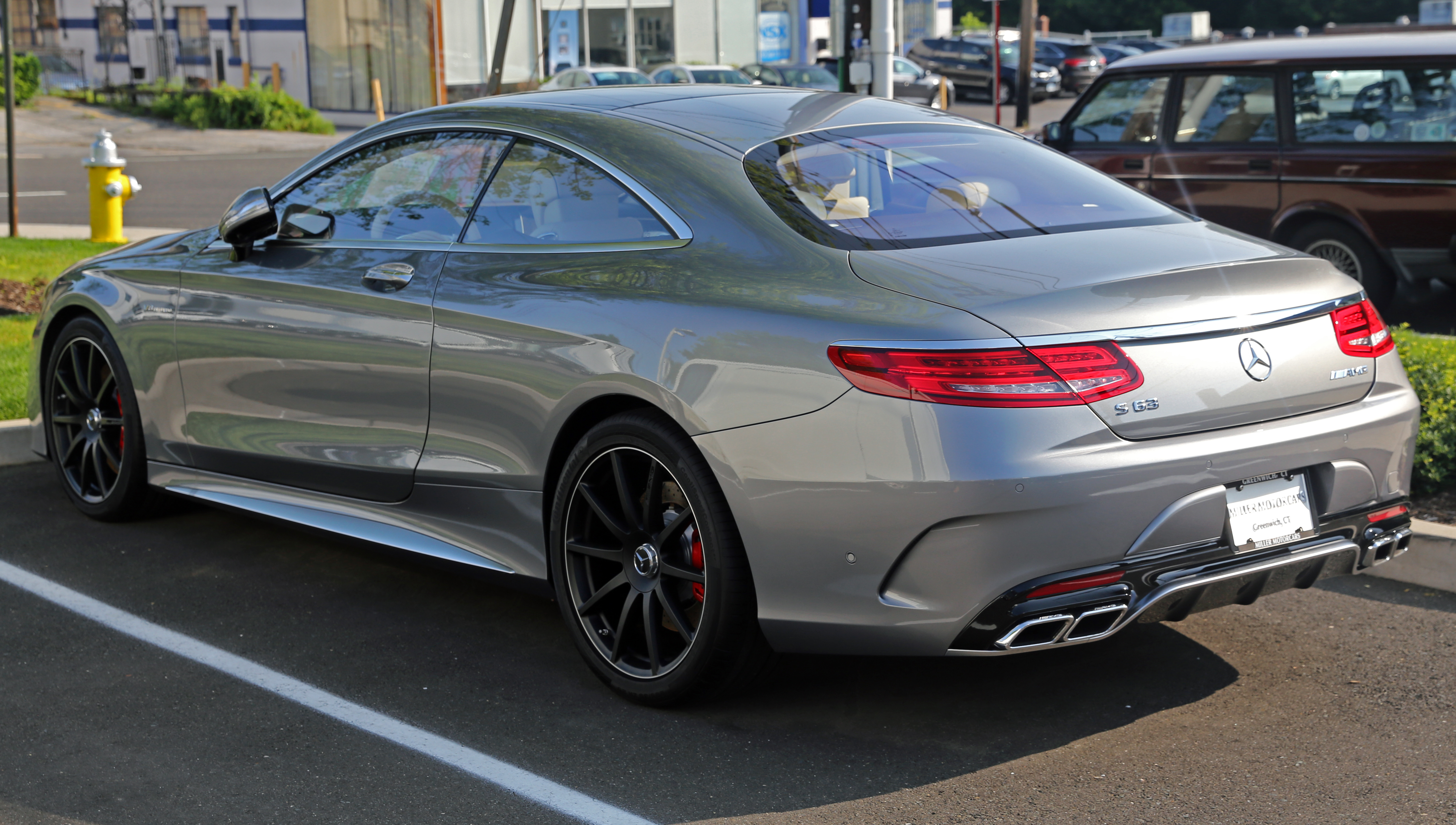
Mercedes-Benz S 63 AMG coupe

Available in short (S 63 AMG only) and long wheelbases, the S 63 AMG is a version of the S-Class saloon with the twin turbocharged M157 V8 engine rated at 430 kW; 577 hp (585 PS) at 5,500 rpm and 900 N⋅m (664 lb⋅ft) at 2,250-3,750 rpm. It features an AMG SpeedShift MCT 7-speed sports transmission, ESP Curve Dynamic Assist, 2 suspension types (AMG RIDE CONTROL sports suspension, AIRMATIC with the Adaptive Damping System ADS PLUS in S 63 AMG 4Matic; "Magic Body Control" with Crosswind stabilization in S 63 AMG with rear-wheel drive), a weight-optimised AMG high-performance composite brake system, AMG sports exhaust system, and a lightweight 78 Ah lithium-ion battery (from the SLS AMG Black Series). Exterior features include 10-spoke or Siena 5 twin spokes, AMG forged light-alloy wheels (optional titanium grey and polished wheels), aluminium body panels, front apron with three large air dams with grille in high-gloss black, flics (air deflectors) in high-gloss black on the side air intakes and side sill panels with three-dimensional inserts in silver chrome. Interior features include an AMG sports steering wheel, AMG door sill panels, AMG floor mats, AMG sports pedals in brushed stainless steel with rubber studs, a spare wheel recess made of carbon fibre, ambient lighting, Attention Assist, Collision Prevention Assist, COMAND Online, 10 loudspeakers with Frontbass, Pre-Safe Plus, Tyre pressure loss warning system, LED High-Performance headlamps, and DISTRONIC PLUS (Driving Assistance package Plus, Night View Assist Plus).

AMG Performance Studio options include an AMG Exterior Carbon-Fibre package, AMG ceramic high-performance composite brake system, AMG carbon-fibre engine cover, AMG performance steering wheel in black Nappa leather / DINAMICA, AMG trim in carbon fibre/black piano lacquer, and red brake callipers.

Other options include Air-Balance package, Burmester surround sound system, Burmester high-end 3D surround sound system, Business Telephony in the rear, Chauffeur package, designo appointments packages, Executive seat, Exclusive package, First-Class rear suite, folding tables in the rear, LED Intelligent Light System, Seat Comfort package including ENERGIZING massage function, and Warmth Comfort package.

The US model of the S 63 AMG 4Matic included an increased top speed of 300 km/h (186 mph), and was set to go on sale in November 2013.

=== S 65 AMG (2014–2019) ===
The S 65 AMG is a version of the long wheelbase S-Class sedan with an AMG 6.0-litre V12 biturbo engine rated at 463 kW; 621 hp (630 PS) at 4,800 rpm and 1,000 N⋅m (738 lb⋅ft) at 2,300-4,300 rpm. Some of the features include a 78 Ah lithium-ion battery, seven-speed automatic transmission, AMG sports suspension with MAGIC BODY CONTROL with Crosswind stabilization, ESP Dynamic Cornering Assist, electromechanical AMG speed-sensitive sports steering with variable steering ratio, optional AMG ceramic high-performance composite braking system (front discs with a diameter of 420 mm), 20-inch AMG 16-spoke light-alloy wheels (optional 10-spoke forged wheels in polished titanium grey or matt black, 5-twin-spoke forged wheels in titanium grey), front apron with three large cooling air intakes, grilles and flics (air deflectors) on the side air intakes in high-gloss chrome and dark paint colours, exclusive carbon-fibre/aluminium engine cover, high-gloss black rear diffuser insert (optional grilles and flics in high-gloss black), AMG sports exhaust system with twin tailpipes, and the V12 radiator grille with six twin louvres, side sill panels, door pins, and more finished in high-gloss chrome. The interior upholstery is finished in exclusive nappa leather with a choice of 5 colour schemes (black, satin beige/espresso brown, nut brown/black, porcelain/black and crystal grey/seashell grey), with newly contoured seat cushions and backrests, seats and door centre panels in an exclusive diamond-pattern design, delineated perforations in the upholstery of the seats, and no perforations in the leather wherever there is contrasting topstitching. The dashboard, steering wheel rim, roof grab handles and roof liner are also all wrapped in leather. The interior features a 2-spoke AMG sports steering wheel, additional wood trim, AMG stainless-steel door sill panels illuminated in white, aluminium shift paddles, analogue clock in an exclusive IWC design (three-dimensional, milled metal hands and genuine metal appliqués on the dial), AMG instrument cluster with two animated round dials on TFT colour display (360 km/h (224 mph) scale speedometer, AMG main menu with digital speedometer and a permanent gear display in the upper section), head-up display, and a 6.5 x 4.5 centimeters touchpad integrated into the handrest with a cover for the keypad.

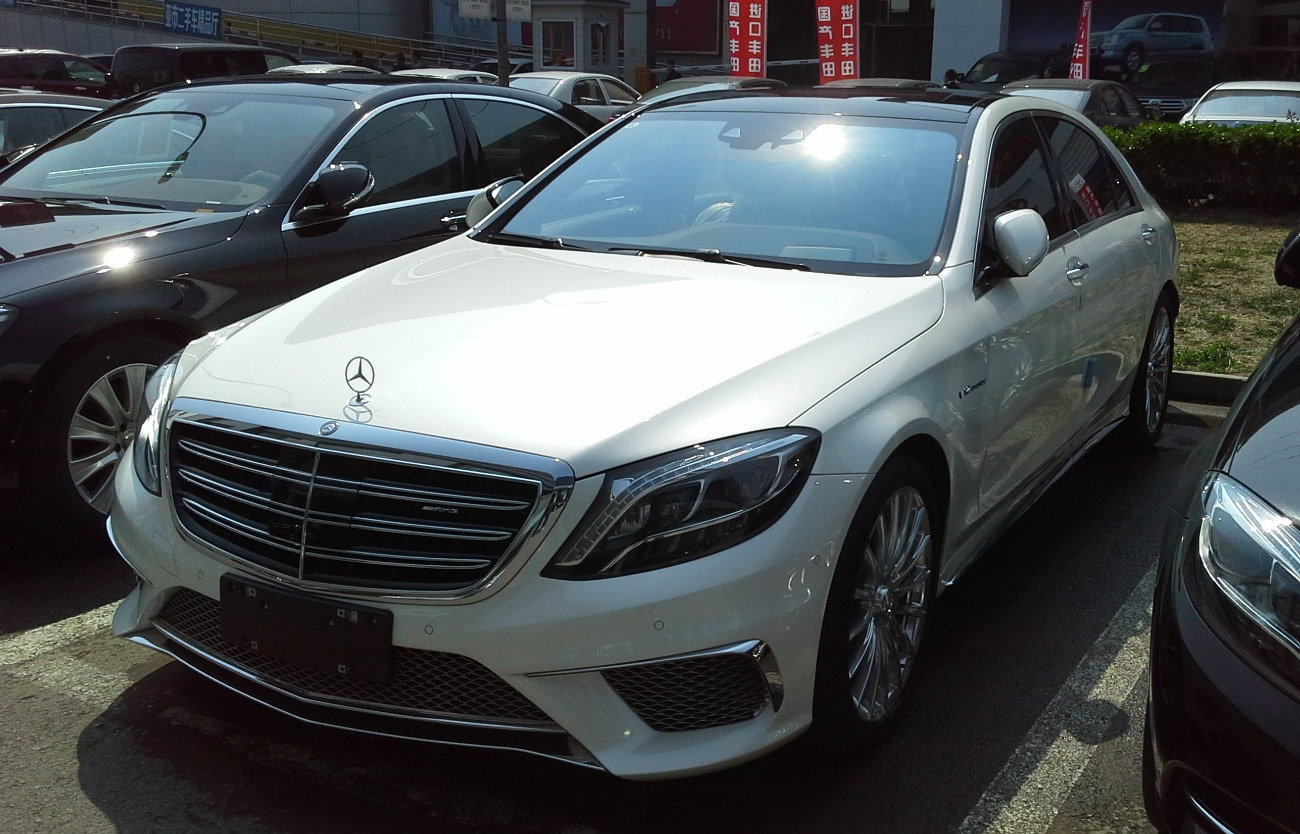
Mercedes-Benz S 65 AMG (W222)

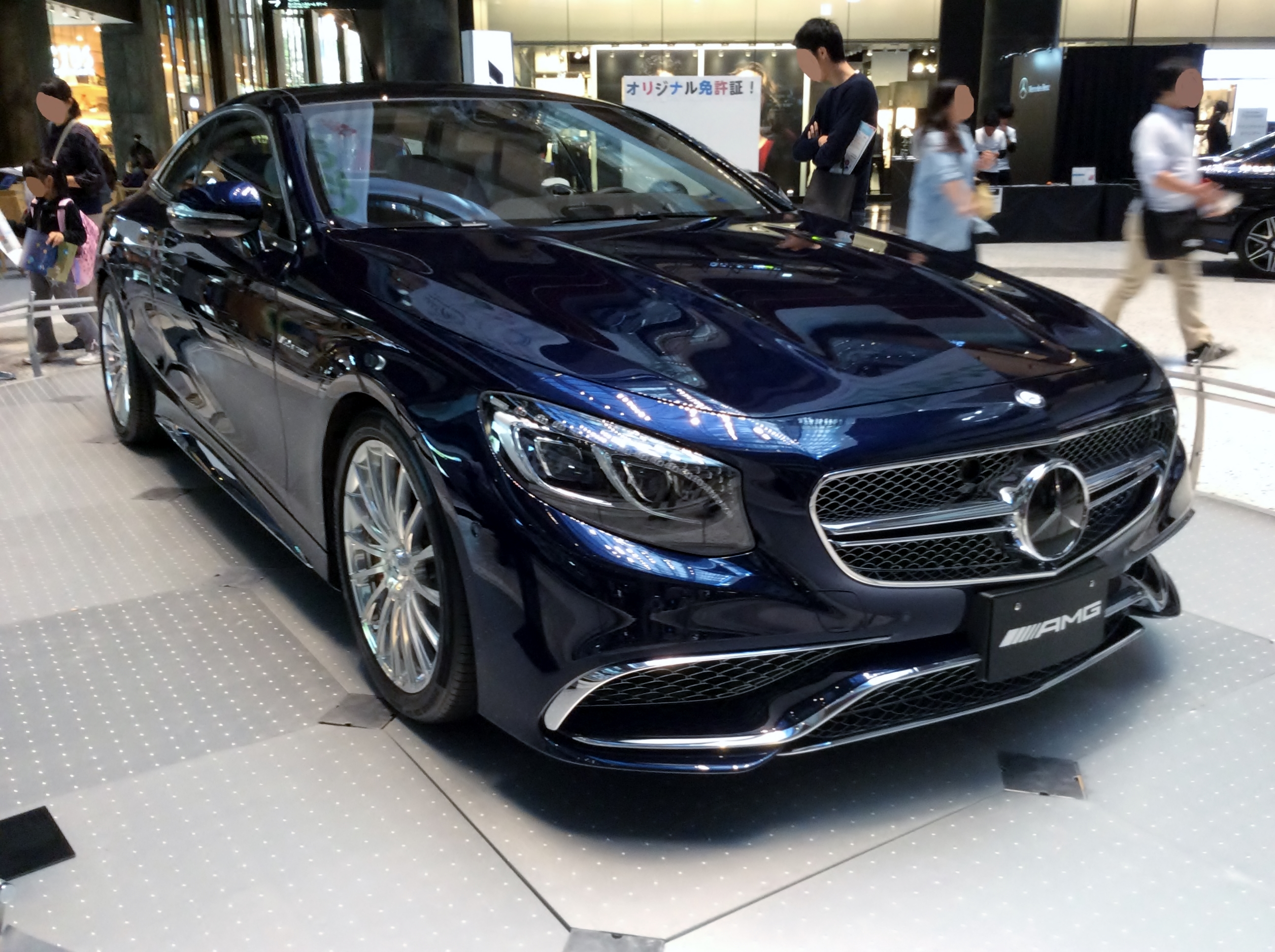
Mercedes-Benz S 65 AMG (C217)

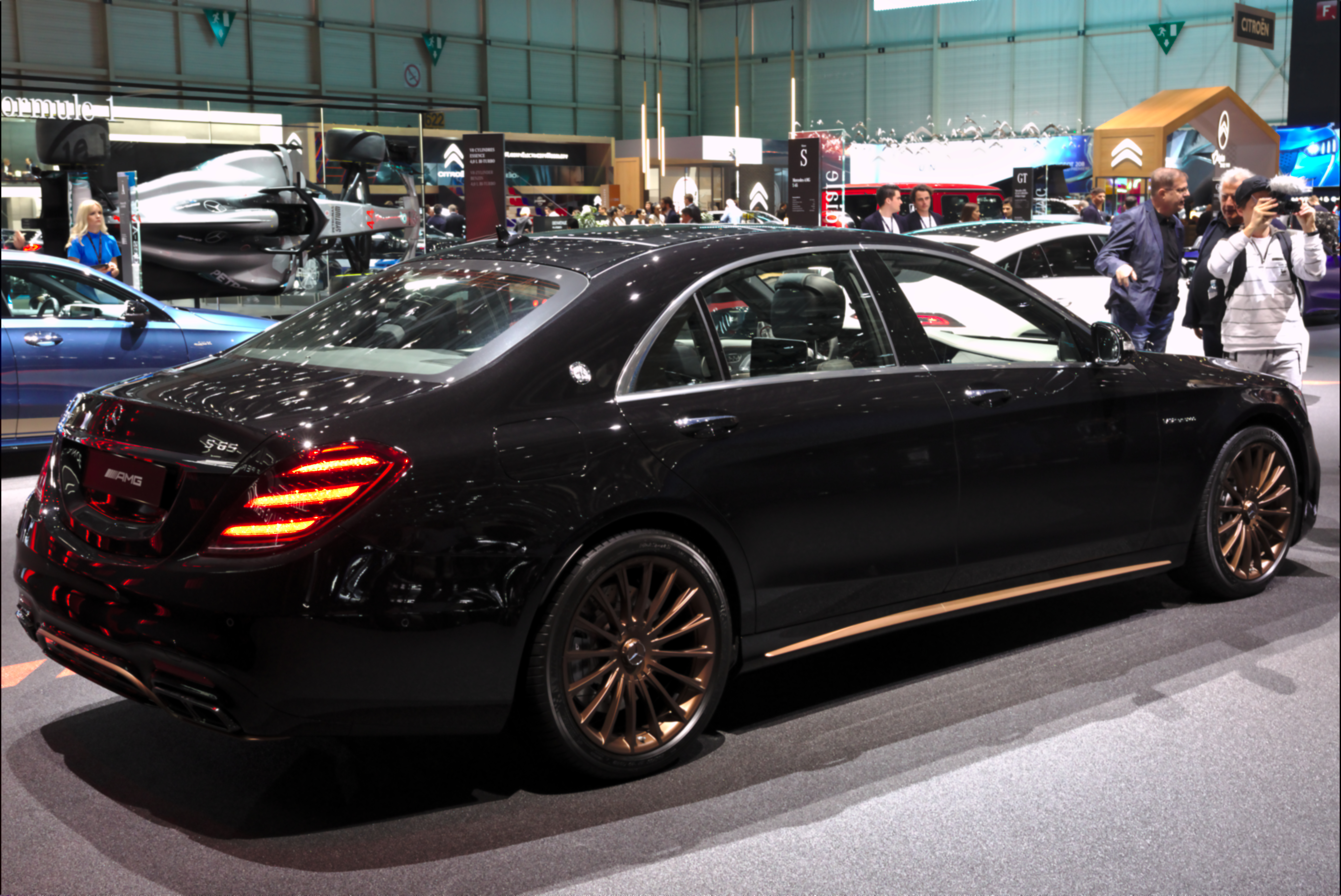
Mercedes-AMG S 65 Final Edition (W222)

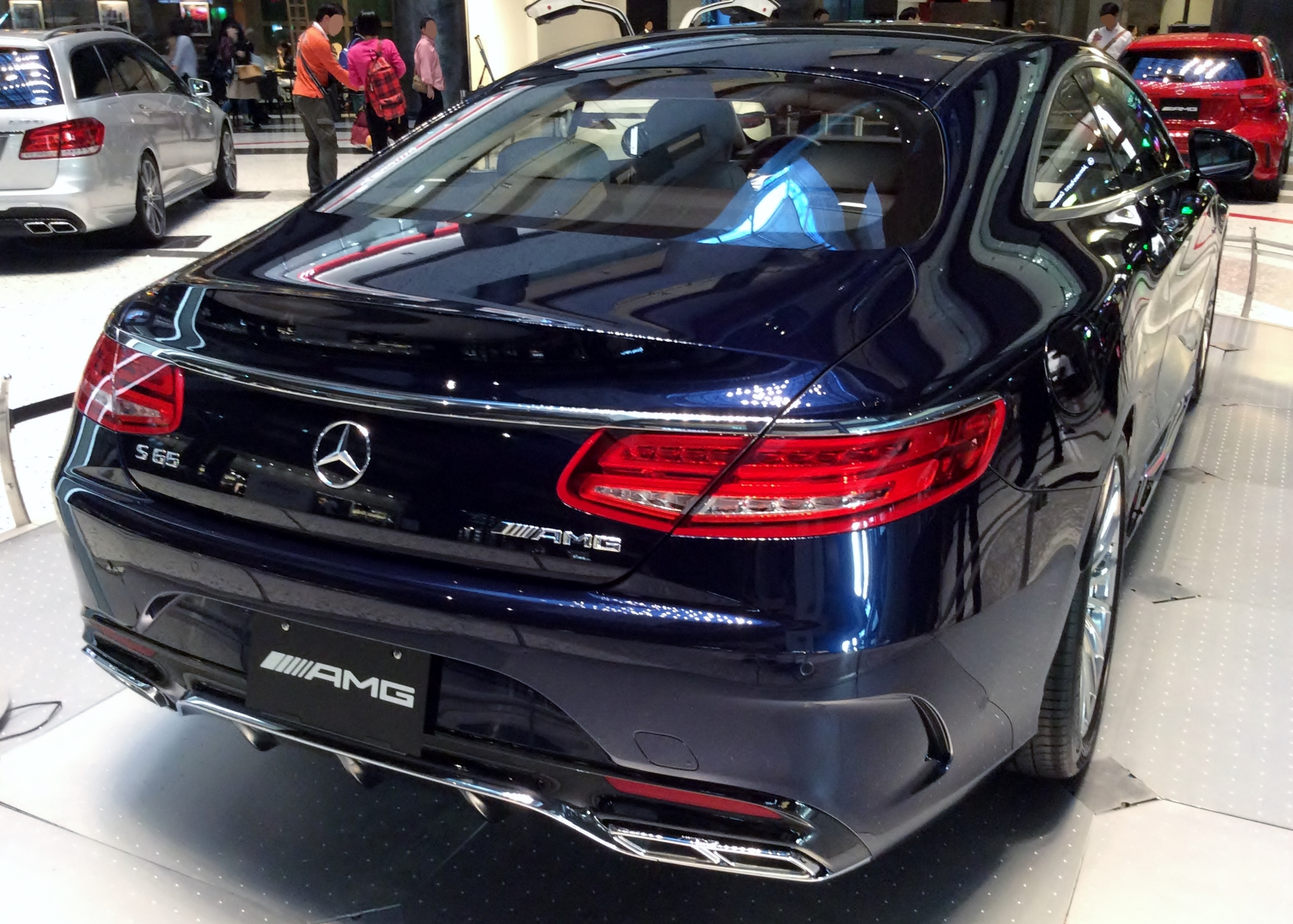
Mercedes-Benz S 65 AMG (C217)

AMG Performance Studio options include an AMG exterior carbon-fibre package, AMG ceramic high-performance composite braking system, AMG performance steering wheel in Nappa leather/DINAMICA (black), AMG trim in carbon-fibre/black piano lacquer, and red brake calipers.

Other options include a 360° camera, Business Telephony in the rear, designo appointments packages, an executive seat, a first-class rear suite, an individual entertainment system in the rear, folding tables in the rear, and a warmth comfort package.

The vehicle was unveiled at the 2013 Los Angeles International Auto Show and the 2013 Tokyo Motor Show, followed by the 2013 Osaka Motor Show.

The vehicle was set to go on sale in March 2014.

On 24 February 2019, Mercedes-Benz announced the S 65 Final Edition with a limited run of 130 units, and unveiled it at the Geneva Auto Salon on 2 March 2019. This model marked the end of the era of the V12 engine within AMG; however, the M279 V12 engine continued on in non AMG models such as the Mercedes-Maybach S 650 (S 680 for the Chinese market) and S 680 Guard 4MATIC. The Final Edition is finished in Obsidian Black metallic paint, with bronze highlights in the front and rear bumpers, underneath the doors, as well as bronze-coloured 20-inch alloy wheels. The special AMG emblems are affixed to the C-pillars. The interior is trimmed in black Exclusive Nappa leather, with special carbon ornamental elements, and bronze-stitching black foot mats. Production ended in November 2019.

=== S 500 e (2014–2017) ===
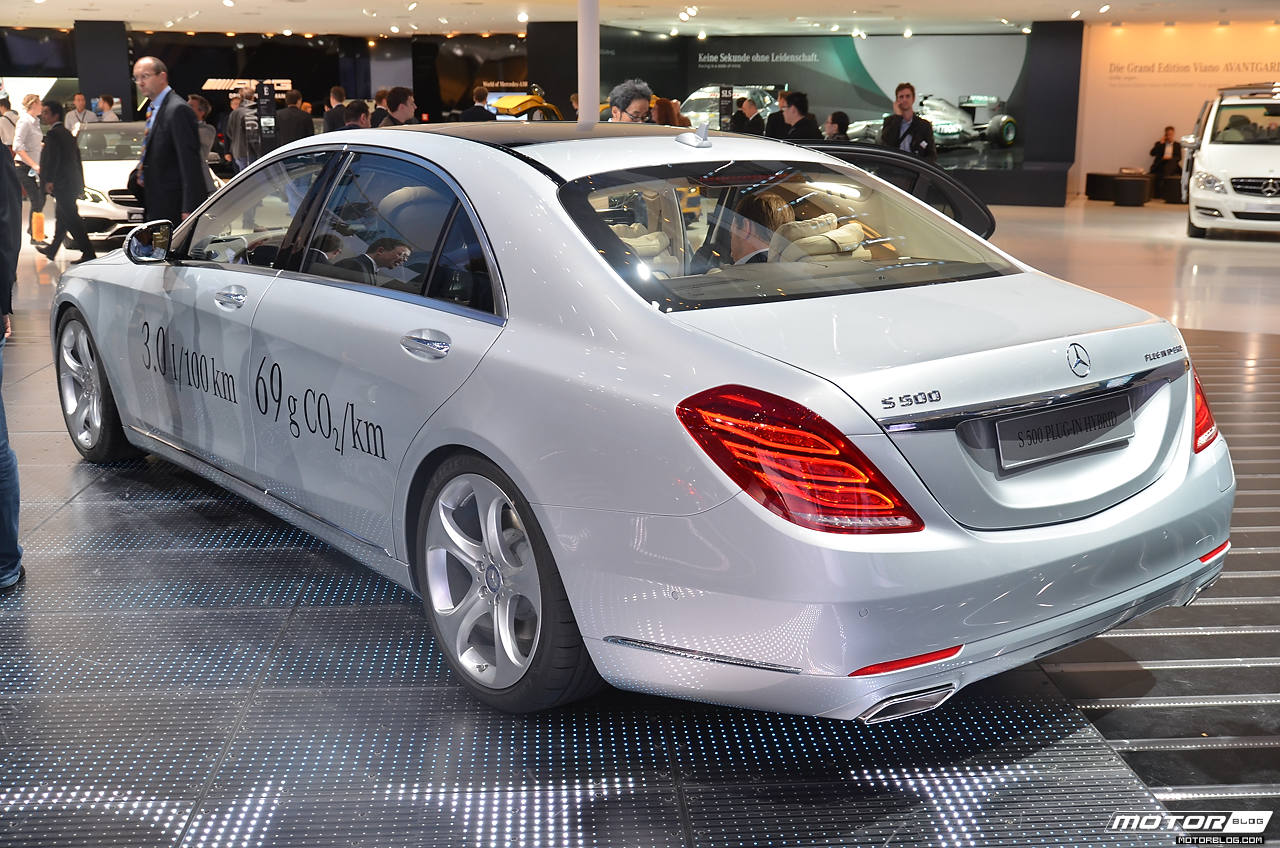
Plug-in badge of the S 500 e plug-in hybrid production model

The S 550 e is a plug-in hybrid version of the long wheelbase S-Class sedan, with a 3.0-litre V6 twin-turbo engine rated at 245 kW; 328 hp (333 PS) and 480 N⋅m (354 lb⋅ft) and an electric motor rated at 80 kW; 108 hp (109 PS) and 340 N⋅m (251 lb⋅ft), and with an externally rechargeable 8.7kWh battery pack. It features 4 hybrid operating modes (HYBRID, E‑MODE, E-SAVE, and CHARGE), second-generation regenerative braking system, haptic accelerator pedal, pre-entry climate control of the interior, and Intelligent HYBRID with (dis)charging management based on COMAND Online navigation data.

The all electric range is about 30 km (19 mi) under the New European Driving Cycle. Under the U.S. Environmental Protection Agency (EPA) tests, the S 500 e has an all-electric range of 14 mi (23 km), with some gasoline consumption (0.1 gal/100 mi). So, the actual all-electric range is rated between 0 and 12 mi (0 and 19 km).

The EPA, under its five-cycle tests, rated the 2015 S 500 e energy consumption in all-electric mode at 59 kWh per 100 miles, which translates into a combined city/highway fuel economy of 58 miles per gallon gasoline equivalent (MPG-e) (4.1 L/100 km; 70 mpg_{−imp} gasoline equivalent). When powered only by the gasoline engine, EPA's official combined city/highway fuel economy is 26 mpg_{‑US} (9.0 L/100 km; 31 mpg_{‑imp}).

The production vehicle was unveiled in Toronto in 2013, followed by the 2013 Frankfurt Motor Show. Deliveries began in September 2014 in Europe, starting at a price of €108,945 (~US$146,000). The U.S. launch was slated for early 2015. A total of 17 units were registered in Germany as of September 2014. According to JATO Dynamics, a total of 38 units were registered in Europe through September 2014.

=== S 600 ===
The S 600 is a version of the long-wheelbase S-Class sedan with a 6.0-litre V12 biturbo engine rated at 390 kW; 523 hp (530 PS) and 830 N⋅m (612 lb⋅ft) at 1,900 rpm. Features include ECO start/stop function, optional touchpad, optional head-up display, Collision Prevention Assist Plus, and optional electric windscreen heating. The vehicle was unveiled at the 2014 North American International Auto Show and went on sale in March 2014.

=== Mercedes-Maybach ===
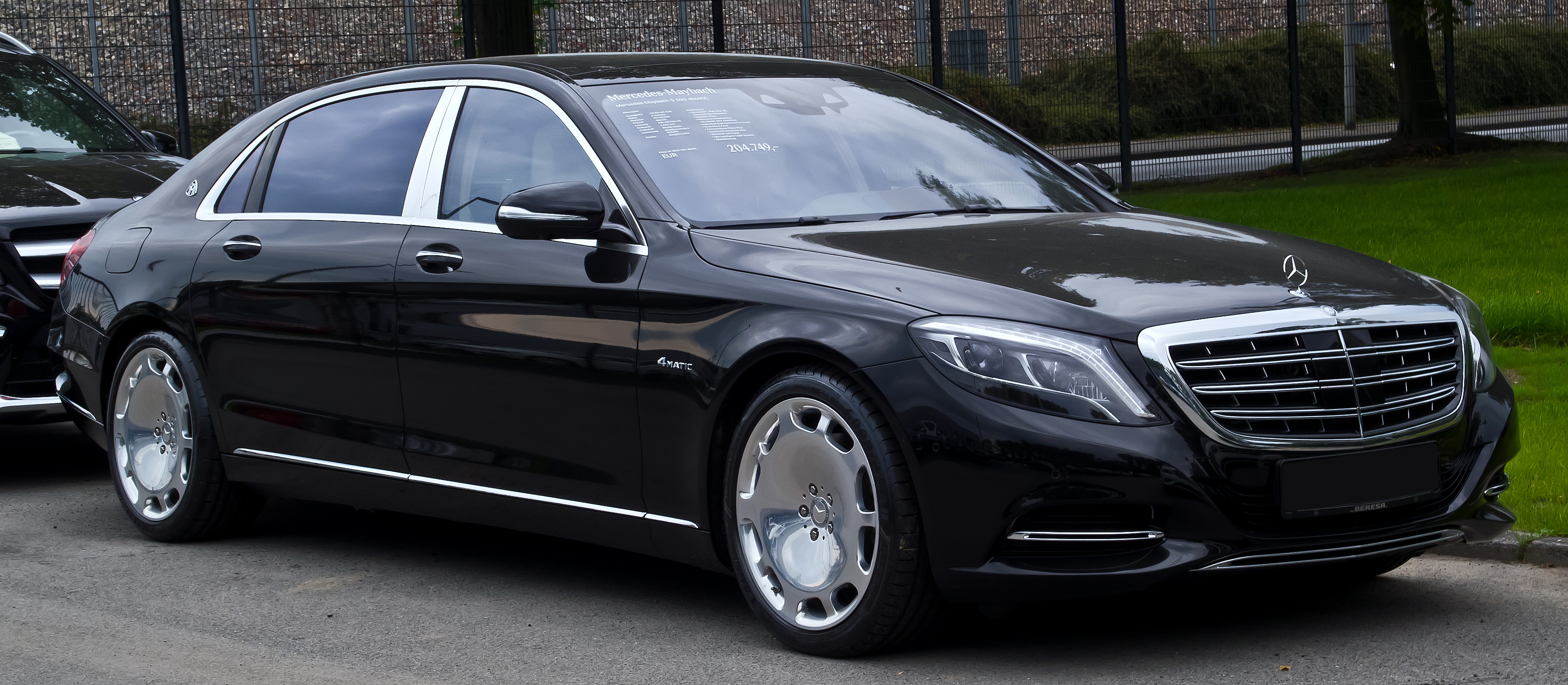

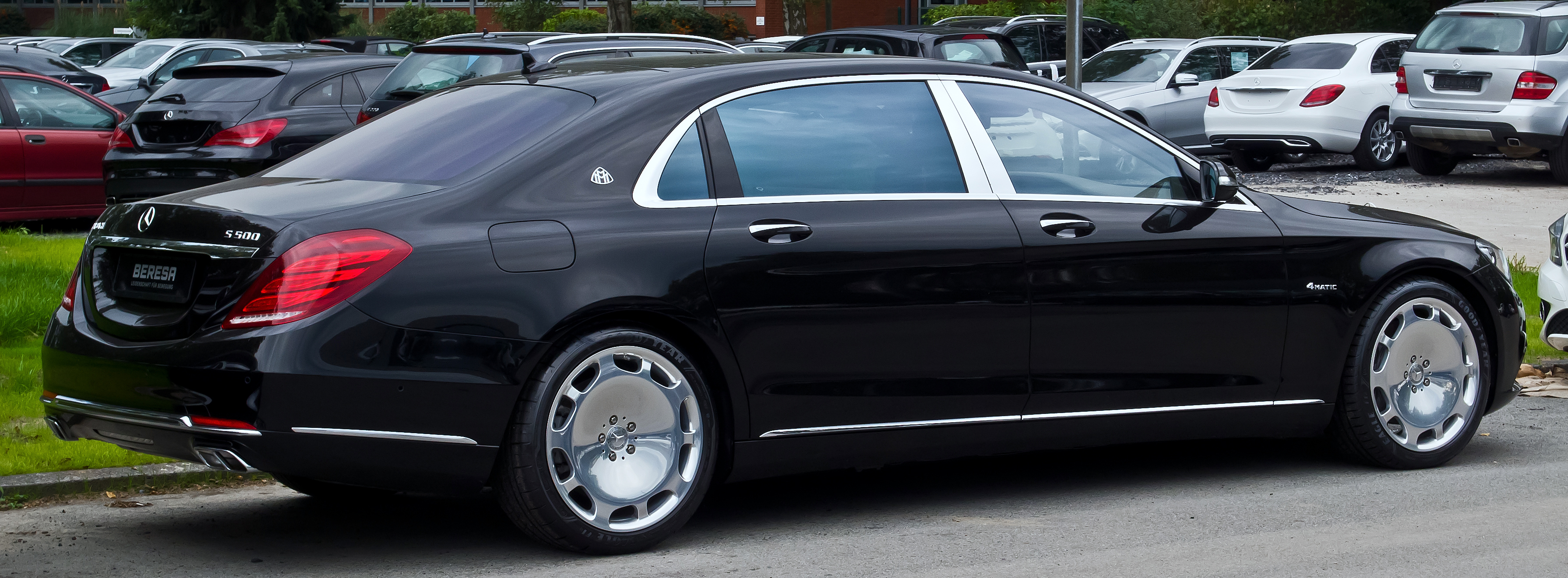
Mercedes-Maybach S 500 (Germany)

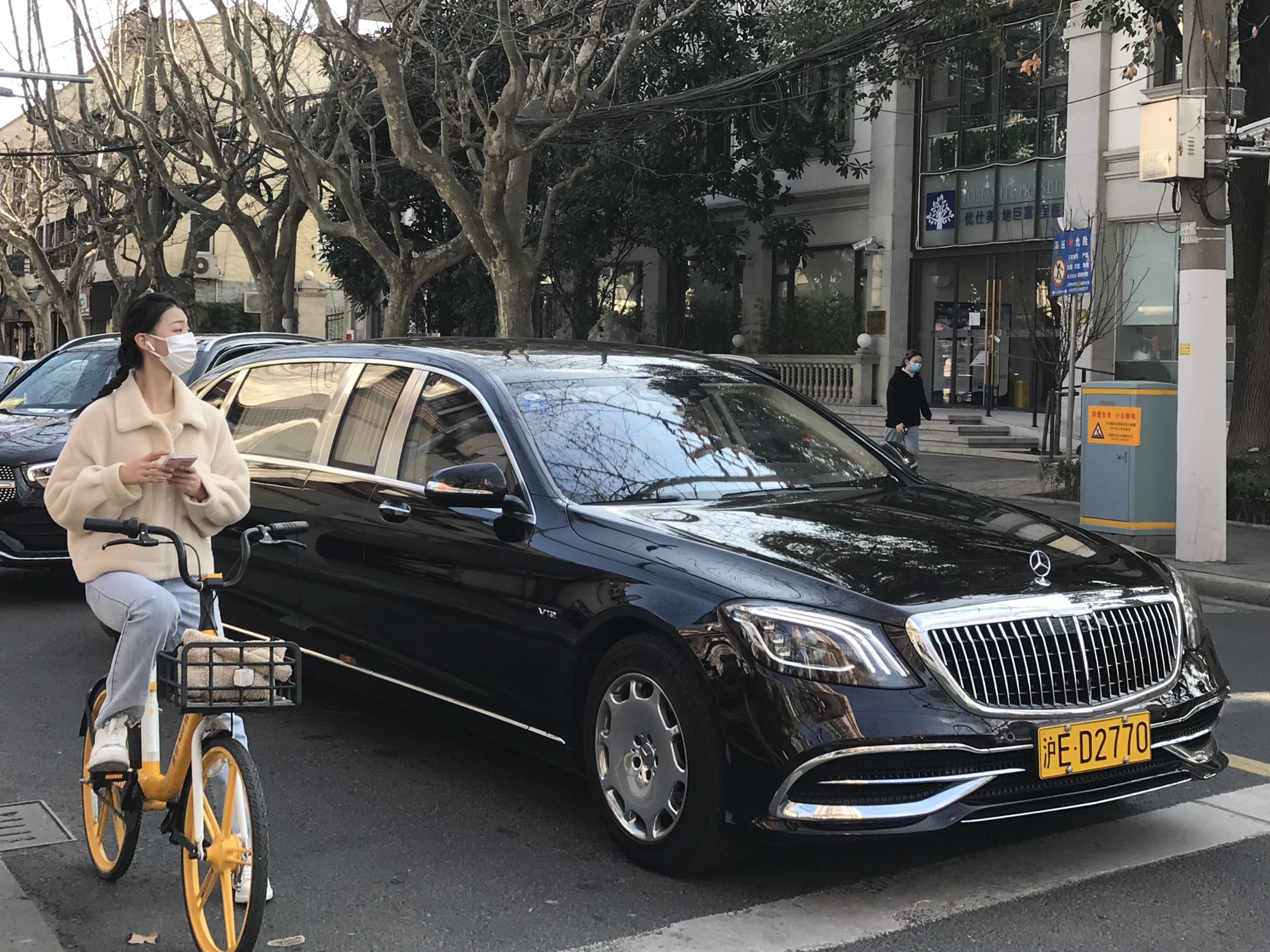

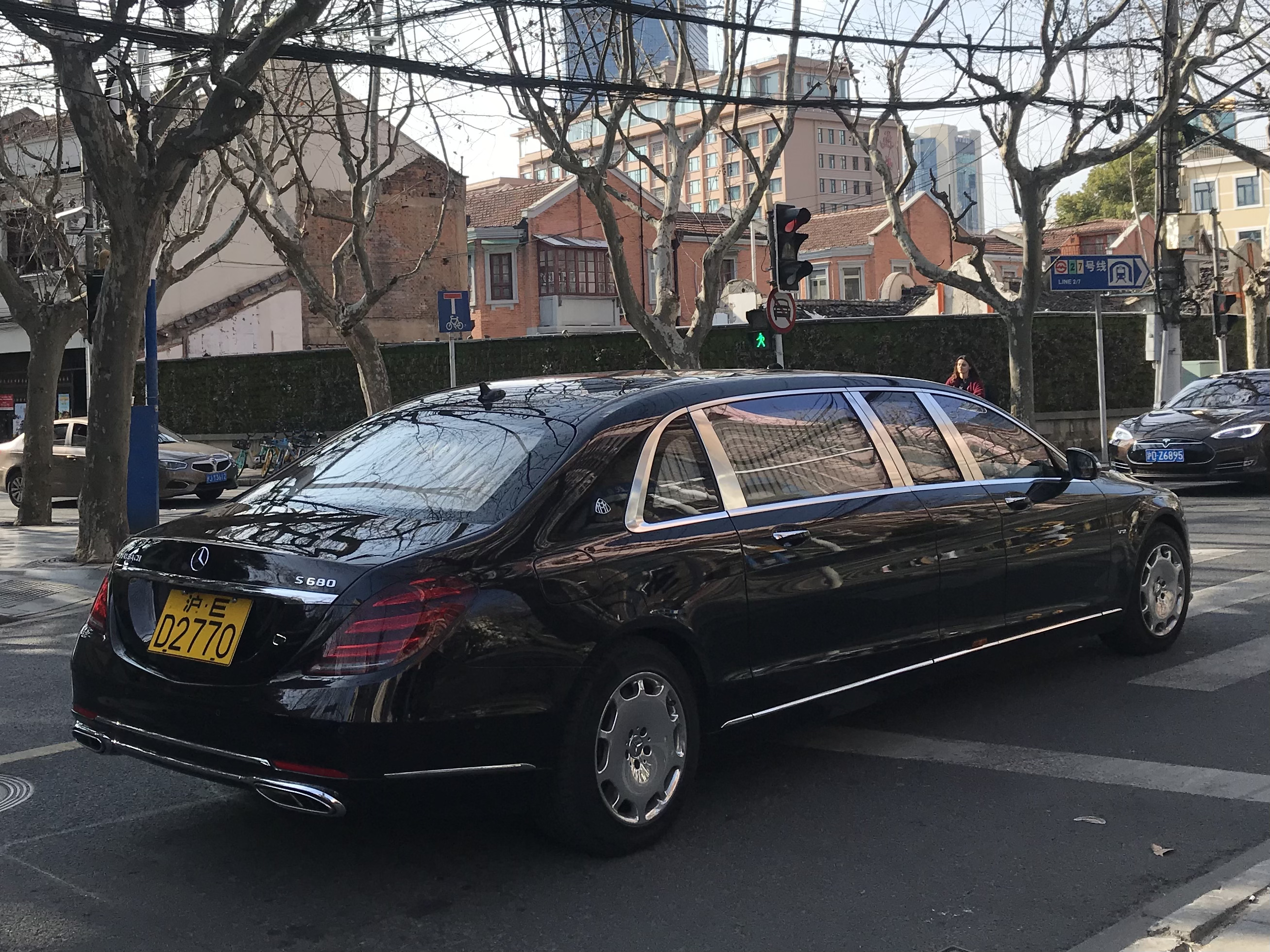
Mercedes-Maybach S 680 Pullman (China)

In 2015, Mercedes brought back the Maybach name as a sub-brand of the Mercedes lineup. The first model produced was the Mercedes-Maybach S-Class, designed to compete against the Bentley Mulsanne and Rolls-Royce Phantom VIII. At 5,453 mm (214.7 in) long with a wheelbase of 3,365 mm (132.5 in), the new model is approximately 20 cm (7.9 in) larger, in both dimensions, compared to the long-wheelbase S-Class models.

The Mercedes-Maybach is available in S 500 and S 600 models (the US received the Mercedes-Maybach S 550 4MATIC and S 600 models, with the S 550 having the same 4.7L engine as the S 500 Mercedes-Maybach elsewhere), with 4MATIC optional, with the V8 engine and V12 for the latter. Mercedes also claims that the S Class is the world's quietest production car. The basic car has colour options and the option of a rear bench seat or 2 reclining rear seats. Options include air-conditioned, heated, and massaging seats; heated armrests; a system to pump agarwood scented ionised air around the cabin; first-class suite for the rear cabin; and a 24-speaker, 1,540 watt Burmester High-End 3D surround sound system.

Assembly of the Maybach S 500 started in Pune, India, in September 2015, India being the second country to produce a Maybach.

In 2017, the facelift S 600 was discontinued, while the S 650 was introduced (with the engine of the former S 65 AMG).

The Mercedes-Maybach S 600 and S 650 were also available in a Pullman version, a chauffeur-driven sedan that includes a partition-separated rear passenger compartment with two sets of paired-facing seats. This version is equipped with the V12 dual-turbocharger gasoline engine, the seven-speed automatic transmission, and rear-wheel drive. The same vehicle is additionally available as an armoured version, known as the Pullman Guard.

At the 2017 Shanghai Motor Show, a new Chinese-only Mercedes-Maybach S 680 was introduced for the 2018 model year and onward. In China and other Asian countries, the number 8 is very auspicious, being closely associated with luck and wealth; hence, Mercedes' decision to name it as they did. The S 680 is essentially identical to the S 650 where equipment is concerned.

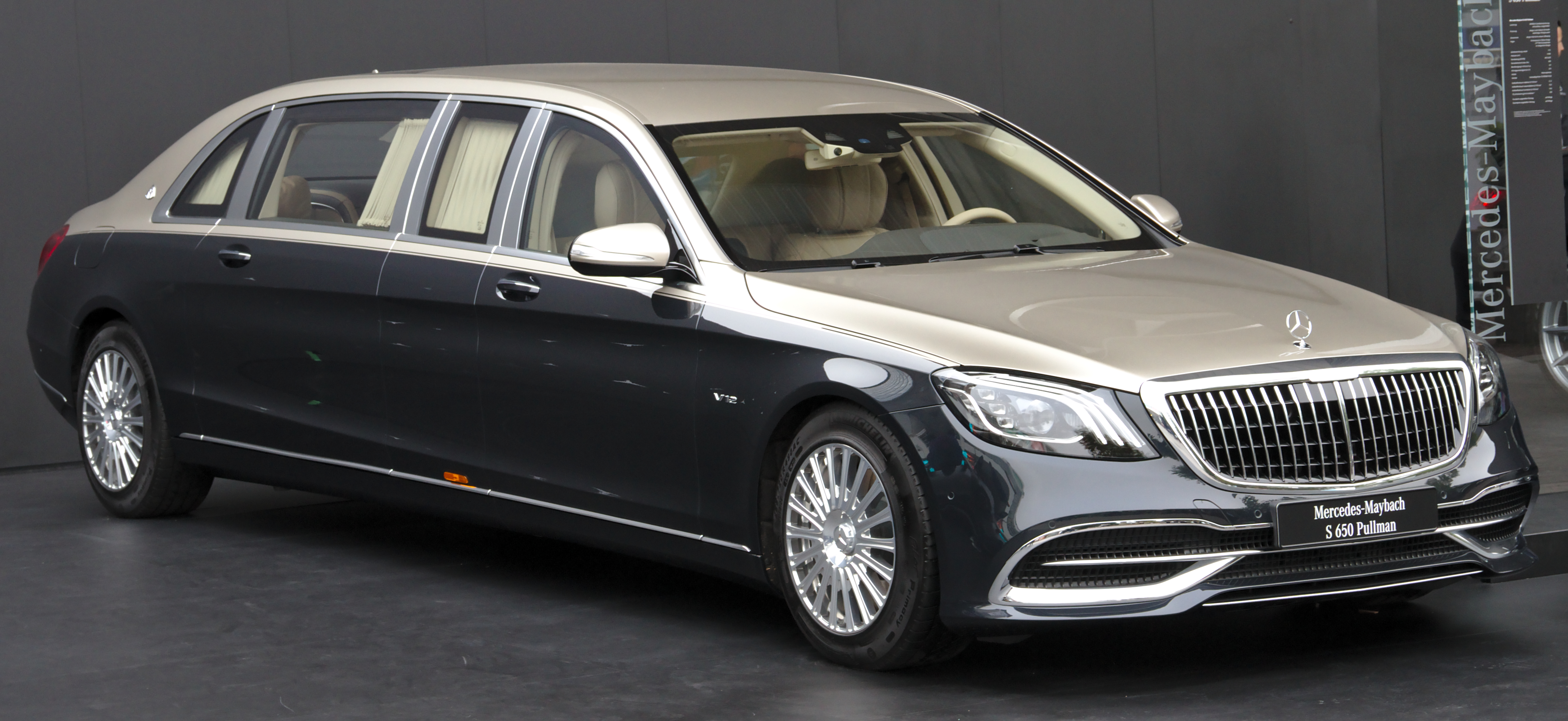
Mercedes-Maybach S 650 Pullman

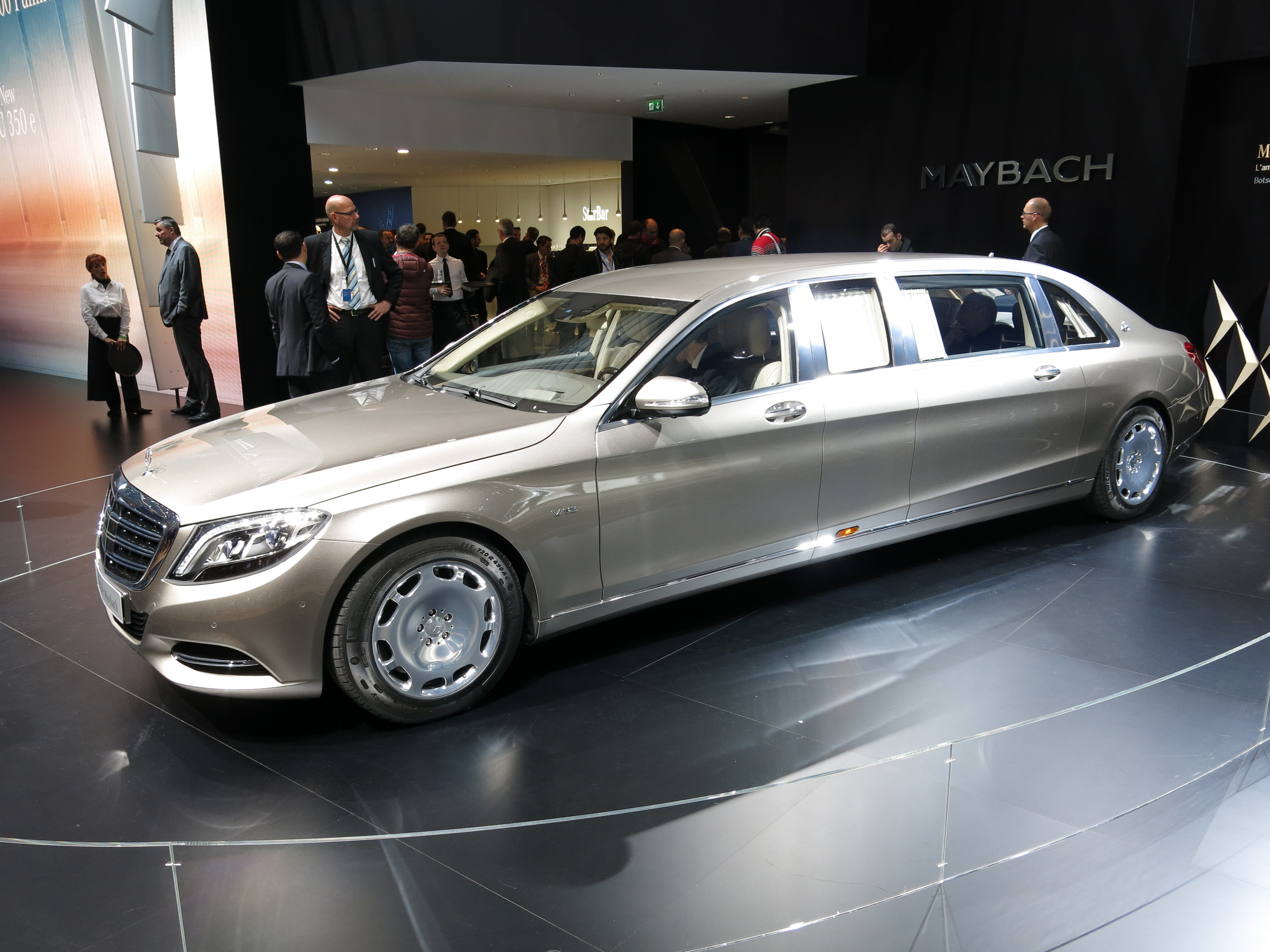
Mercedes-Maybach S 600 Pullman

== Specifications ==
=== Engines (2013–2017) ===
Model	Years	Configuration	Displacement	Power	Torque	0–100 km/h (0–62 mph)	Top Speed (km/h)	Fuel Consumption/Efficiency (EU-Norm combined)
Petrol engines
S 320 (China)	2014–2017	V6 (M 276 DE 30 AL)	2,996 cc (182.8 cu in)	200 kW (272 PS; 268 bhp) at 5,000 rpm	400 N⋅m (295 lb⋅ft) at 1,300-4,500 rpm	N.A.	250 km/h (155 mph)	8.0 L/100 km (29 mpg_{‑US})
S 400 4MATIC	2015–2017	V6 biturbo (M 276 DE 30 AL)	2,996 cc (182.8 cu in)	245 kW (333 PS; 329 bhp) at 5,250 rpm	480 N⋅m (354 lb⋅ft) at 1,600-4,000	6.1 seconds	250 km/h (155 mph)	8.4 L/100 km (28 mpg_{‑US})
Maybach S 400 4MATIC	2015–2017	V6 biturbo (M 276 DE 30 AL)	2,996 cc (182.8 cu in)	245 kW (333 PS; 329 bhp) at 5,250 rpm	480 N⋅m (354 lb⋅ft) at 1,600-4,000	6.3 seconds	250 km/h (155 mph)	N.A.
S 500, S 550 (US)	2013–2017	V8 biturbo (M 278 DE 46 AL)	4,663 cc (284.6 cu in)	335 kW (455 PS; 449 bhp) at 5,250	700 N⋅m (516 lb⋅ft) at 1,800-3,500	4.8 seconds	250 km/h (155 mph)	8.6–9.1 L/100 km (27–26 mpg_{‑US})
S 500 4MATIC; S 550 4MATIC (US)	2013–2017	V8 biturbo (M 278 DE 46 AL)	4,663 cc (284.6 cu in)	335 kW (455 PS; 449 bhp) at 5,250	700 N⋅m (516 lb⋅ft) at 1,800-3,500	4.8 seconds	250 km/h (155 mph)	9.1 L/100 km (26 mpg_{‑US})
Maybach S 500	2015–2017	V8 biturbo (M 278 DE 46 AL)	4,663 cc (284.6 cu in)	335 kW (455 PS; 449 bhp) at 5,250	700 N⋅m (516 lb⋅ft) at 1,800-3,500	5.0 seconds	250 km/h (155 mph)	8.6 L/100 km (27 mpg_{‑US})
Maybach S 500 4MATIC	2015–2017	V8 biturbo (M 278 DE 46 AL)	4,663 cc (284.6 cu in)	335 kW (455 PS; 449 bhp) at 5,250	700 N⋅m (516 lb⋅ft) at 1,800-3,500	5.0 seconds	250 km/h (155 mph)	9.4 L/100 km (25 mpg_{‑US})
S 600	2014–2017	V12 biturbo (M 277 E 60 AL)	5,980 cc (365 cu in)	390 kW (530 PS; 523 bhp) at 4,900–5300	830 N⋅m (612 lb⋅ft) at 1,900–4,000	4.6 seconds	250 km/h (155 mph)	11.1–11.3 L/100 km (21.2–20.8 mpg_{‑US})
Maybach S 600	2014–2017	V12 biturbo (M 277 E 60 AL)	5,980 cc (365 cu in)	390 kW (530 PS; 523 bhp) at 4,900–5300	830 N⋅m (612 lb⋅ft) at 1,900–4,000	5.0 seconds	250 km/h (155 mph)	11.7 L/100 km (20.1 mpg_{‑US})
S 63 AMG	2013–2017	V8 biturbo (M157 DE 55 AL)	5,461 cc (333.3 cu in)	430 kW (585 PS; 577 bhp) at 5,500	900 N⋅m (664 lb⋅ft) at 2,250–3,750	4.4 seconds	250 km/h (155 mph), 300 km/h (186 mph)*	10.1 L/100 km (23 mpg_{‑US})
S 63 AMG 4MATIC	2013–2017	V8 biturbo (M157 DE 55 AL)	5,461 cc (333.3 cu in)	430 kW (585 PS; 577 bhp) at 5,500	900 N⋅m (664 lb⋅ft) at 2,250–3,750	4.0 seconds	250 km/h (155 mph), 300 km/h (186 mph)*	10.3 L/100 km (23 mpg_{‑US})
S 65 AMG	2014–2017	V12 biturbo (M 279 E 60 AL)	5,980 cc (365 cu in)	463 kW (630 PS; 621 bhp) at 4,800	1,000 N⋅m (738 lb⋅ft) at 2,300–4,300	4.2 seconds	250 km/h (155 mph), 300 km/h (186 mph)*	11.9 L/100 km (19.8 mpg_{‑US})
Petrol engines + hybrid
S 400h**	2013–2017	V6 (M 276 DE 35)	3,498 cc (213.5 cu in)	225 kW (306 PS; 302 bhp) at 6500 (Engine) / 20 kW (27 PS; 27 bhp) (Electric)	370 N⋅m (273 lb⋅ft) at 3,500-5,250 (Engine) / 250 N⋅m (184 lb⋅ft) (Electric)	6.0 seconds	250 km/h (155 mph)	6.3 L/100 km (37 mpg_{‑US})
S 500e**	2014–2017	V6 (M 276 DE 30 AL)	2,996 cc (182.8 cu in)	245 kW (333 PS; 329 bhp) at 5,250 (Engine) / 20 kW (27 PS; 27 bhp) (Electric)	480 N⋅m (354 lb⋅ft) at 1,600-4,000 (Engine) / 340 N⋅m (251 lb⋅ft) (Electric)	5.2 seconds	250 km/h (155 mph)	2.8 L/100 km (84 mpg_{‑US})
Diesel engines
S 350d**	2013–2017	V6 turbo (OM 642 LS DE 30 LA)	2,987 cc (182.3 cu in)	190 kW (258 PS; 255 bhp) at 3,600	620 N⋅m (457 lb⋅ft) at 1,600–2,400	6.8 seconds	250 km/h (155 mph)	5.5–6.0 L/100 km (43–39 mpg_{‑US})
S 350d 4MATIC**	2014–2017	V6 turbo (OM 642 LS DE 30 LA)	2,987 cc (182.3 cu in)	190 kW (258 PS; 255 bhp) at 3,600	620 N⋅m (457 lb⋅ft) at 1,600–2,400	6.8 seconds	250 km/h (155 mph)	5.9–6.4 L/100 km (40–37 mpg_{‑US})
Diesel engines + hybrid
S 300h**	2014–2017	Inline 4 biturbo (OM 651 DE 22 LA)	2,148 cc (131.1 cu in)	150 kW (204 PS; 201 bhp) at 4,200 (Engine) / 20 kW (27 PS; 27 bhp) (Electric)	500 N⋅m (369 lb⋅ft) at 1,600–1,800 (Engine) / 250 N⋅m (184 lb⋅ft) (Electric)	7.6 seconds		

- With optional extra-cost AMG Driver Package
- Badged as S 400 HYBRID, S 500 PLUG-IN HYBRID, S 350 BlueTEC, S 350 BlueTEC 4MATIC and S 300 BlueTEC HYBRID before 2015

=== Transmission (2013–2017) ===
Model	Years	Types
S 320	2014–2017	7-speed automatic 7G-TRONIC PLUS
S 400	2013–2017	7-speed automatic 7G-TRONIC PLUS
S 400 4MATIC	2015–2017	7-speed automatic 7G-TRONIC PLUS
S 400h	2013–2017	7-speed automatic 7G-TRONIC PLUS
Maybach S 400 4MATIC	2014–2017	7-speed automatic 7G-TRONIC PLUS
S 500	2013–2017	7-speed automatic 7G-TRONIC PLUS, 9-speed automatic 9G-TRONIC for S 500 Coupé from January 2015
S 500 4MATIC	2013–2017	7-speed automatic 7G-TRONIC PLUS, 9-speed automatic 9G-TRONIC for S 500 Coupé from January 2015
S 500 e PLUG-IN HYBRID	2014–2017	7-speed automatic 7G-TRONIC PLUS
Maybach S 500	2014–2017	9-speed automatic 9G-TRONIC
Maybach S 500 4MATIC	2014–2017	9-speed automatic 9G-TRONIC
S 600	2014–2017	7-speed automatic 7G-TRONIC Plus
Maybach S 600	2014–2017	7-speed automatic 7G-TRONIC PLUS
S 63 AMG	2013–2017	7-speed automatic AMG SPEEDSHIFT MCT
S 63 AMG 4Matic	2013–2017	7-speed automatic AMG SPEEDSHIFT MCT
S 65 AMG	2013–2019	7-speed automatic AMG SPEEDSHIFT Plus 7G-TRONIC
S 300h/ S 300 BlueTEC HYBRID	2014–2017	7-speed automatic 7G-TRONIC PLUS
S 350d/ S 350 BlueTEC	2013–2017	7-speed automatic 7G-TRONIC PLUS, 9-speed automatic 9G-TRONIC for S 350d from January 2015
S 350d 4MATIC/ S 350 BlueTEC 4MATIC	2013–2017	7-speed automatic 7G-TRONIC PLUS, 9-speed automatic 9G-TRONIC for S 350d from January 2015

== W222 facelift (2017–2020) ==
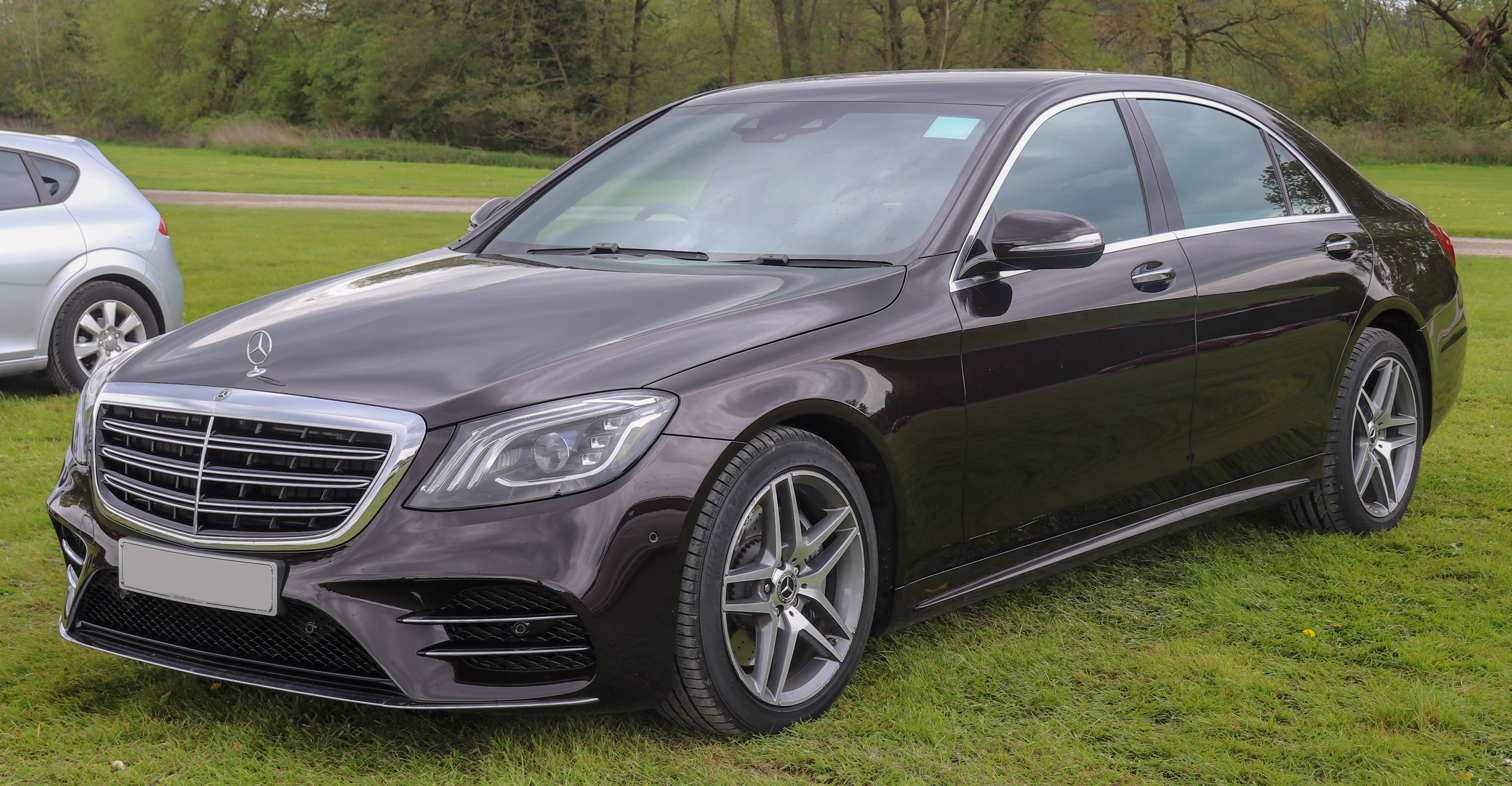

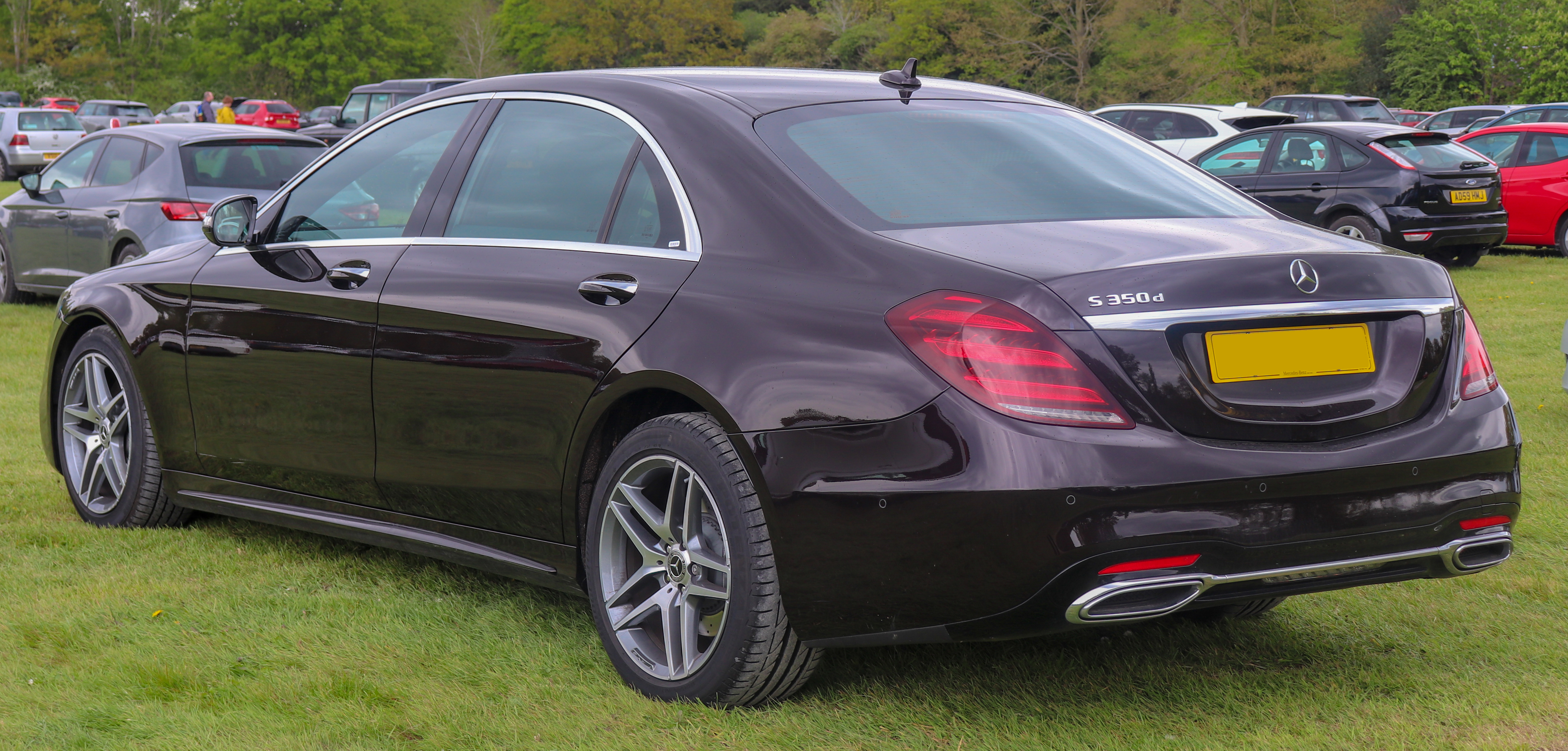
2019 S 350 L AMG Line

A mid-cycle refresh was unveiled in April 2017 and entered production on 3 July 2017 for the 2018 model year. The refresh introduces the new 48-volt integrated starter/alternator, ENERGIZING Comfort Control, and updated autonomous driving technologies. The grille is updated to differentiate between six and eight-cylinder engine versions and long wheelbase and V12 versions. The headlamps and taillamps are also revised with new, enhanced LED technology.

A new range of six-cylinder inline petrol and diesel engines is offered with electrification (20 kilowatts/22 horsepower). This marks the return of six-cylinder inline engines to the S-Class, since the last one was offered in 2005. The engine is 2,999 cc (3.0 L) for both petrol and 2,927 cc (2.9 L) diesel engines. The sole gas V6 engine is in the S 560 e with a plug-in hybrid system. The four-cylinder inline engine with a hybrid system (S 300 h) was removed from the S-Class model range. Additionally, the old 4.7-litre V8 petrol engine is replaced by the new AMG-engineered 4.0-litre biturbo V8, consolidating the V8 engine range to one size. 2019 marks the final year of the S 65 AMG, with 130 units to be finished in obsidian black metallic paint with bronze highlights on the body and alloy wheels. However, the 6.0-litre V12 AMG carries on in the Maybach S 650 after the production of the S 65 AMG ended.

Inline 6 and V8 engines are now paired with the 9-speed 9G-TRONIC automatic transmission (AMG Speedshift MCT for S 63 AMG 4MATIC+) while V12 engines continue to use the 7G-TRONIC PLUS transmission.

The S 63 AMG 4MATIC+ became the sole choice for the V8 version of the S-Class from AMG, eliminating the previous rear-wheel-drive version.

=== Engines (2017–2020) ===
Model	Years	Configuration	Displacement	Power	Torque	0–100 km/h (0–62 mph)	Top Speed	Fuel Consumption/Efficiency (EU-Norm combined)
Petrol Engines
S 320 (China)	2017– 2020	I4 turbo (M264 E20 DEH LA)	1,991 cc (121.5 cu in)	220 kW (299 PS; 295 hp)	400 N⋅m (295 lb⋅ft)	6.6 seconds		
S 450 (non-EU)	2018– 2020	V6 turbo (M 276 DE 30 A)	2,996 cc (182.8 cu in)	270 kW (367 PS; 362 hp)	500 N⋅m (369 lbf⋅ft)	5.3 seconds		
S 450; 4MATIC (non-EU)	2018– 2020	V6 turbo (M 276 DE 30 A)	2,996 cc (182.8 cu in)	270 kW (367 PS; 362 hp)	500 N⋅m (369 lbf⋅ft)	5.4 seconds		
S 450 (EU)	2017–2020	Inline 6 turbo (M 256 E30 DEH LA GR) + Electric Motor	2,999 cc (183.0 cu in)	270 kW (367 PS; 362 hp) at 5,500-6,100 rpm (Engine) / 16 kW (22 PS; 21 hp) (Electric)	500 N⋅m (369 lbf⋅ft)	5.1 seconds	250 km/h (155 mph)	7.3–7.5 L/100 km (32–31 mpg_{‑US})
S 450; 4MATIC (EU)	2017–2020	Inline 6 turbo (M 256 E30 DEH LA GR) + Electric Motor	2,999 cc (183.0 cu in)	270 kW (367 PS; 362 hp) at 5,500-6,100 rpm (Engine) / 16 kW (22 PS; 21 hp) (Electric)	500 N⋅m (369 lbf⋅ft)	4.9 seconds	250 km/h (155 mph)	8.1–8.3 L/100 km (29–28 mpg_{‑US})
S 500	2017–2020	Inline 6 turbo (M 256 E30 DEH LA G) + Electric Motor	2,999 cc (183.0 cu in)	320 kW (435 PS; 429 hp) at 5,900-6,100 rpm (Engine) / 16 kW (22 PS; 21 hp) (Electric)	520 N⋅m (384 lbf⋅ft)	4.8 seconds	250 km/h (155 mph)	7.3–7.5 L/100 km (32–31 mpg_{‑US})
S 560	2017–2020	V8 biturbo (M176 DE 40 AL)	3,982 cc (243.0 cu in)	345 kW (469 PS; 463 hp)	700 N⋅m (516 lbf⋅ft)	4.7 seconds	250 km/h (155 mph)	7.9–8.2 L/100 km (30–29 mpg_{‑US})
S 560; 4MATIC	2017–2020	V8 biturbo (M176 DE 40 AL)	3,982 cc (243.0 cu in)	345 kW (469 PS; 463 hp)	700 N⋅m (516 lbf⋅ft)	4.6 seconds	250 km/h (155 mph)	8.5–8.8 L/100 km (28–27 mpg_{‑US})
Maybach; S 560	2017–2020	V8 biturbo (M176 DE 40 AL)	3,982 cc (243.0 cu in)	345 kW (469 PS; 463 hp)	700 N⋅m (516 lbf⋅ft)	4.9 seconds	250 km/h (155 mph)	8.8 L/100 km (27 mpg_{‑US})
Maybach; S 560; 4MATIC	2017–2020	V8 biturbo (M176 DE 40 AL)	3,982 cc (243.0 cu in)	345 kW (469 PS; 463 hp)	700 N⋅m (516 lbf⋅ft)	4.9 seconds	250 km/h (155 mph)	9.3 L/100 km (25 mpg_{‑US})
S 63; AMG; 4MATIC+	2017–2020	V8 biturbo (M177 DE 40 AL)	3,982 cc (243.0 cu in)	450 kW (612 PS; 603 hp)	900 N⋅m (664 lbf⋅ft)	3.5 seconds	250 km/h (155 mph)	8.9 L/100 km (26 mpg_{‑US})
S 65; AMG	2017–2020	V12 biturbo (M 279 E 60 AL)	5,980 cc (365 cu in)	463 kW (630 PS; 621 hp)	1,000 N⋅m (738 lbf⋅ft)	4.2 seconds	250 km/h (155 mph)	7.3–7.5 L/100 km (32–31 mpg_{‑US})
Maybach; S 650; Maybach S 680 (China)	2017–2020	V12 biturbo (M 279 E 60 AL)	5,980 cc (365 cu in)	463 kW (630 PS; 621 hp)	1,000 N⋅m (738 lbf⋅ft)	4.7 seconds	250 km/h (155 mph)	12.7 L/100 km (18.5 mpg_{‑US})
Diesel engines
S 350 d	2017–2020	Inline 6 turbo (OM 656 DE29T LA)	2,927 cc (178.6 cu in)	210 kW (286 PS; 282 hp)	600 N⋅m (443 lbf⋅ft)	6.0 seconds	250 km/h (155 mph)	5.1–5.4 L/100 km (46–44 mpg_{‑US})
S 350 d 4MATIC	2017–2020	Inline 6 turbo (OM 656 DE29T LA)	2,927 cc (178.6 cu in)	210 kW (286 PS; 282 hp)	600 N⋅m (443 lbf⋅ft)	5.8 seconds	250 km/h (155 mph)	5.5–5.7 L/100 km (43–41 mpg_{‑US})
S 400 d	2017–2020	Inline 6 turbo (OM 656 DE29TT LA)	2,927 cc (178.6 cu in)	250 kW (340 PS; 335 hp)	600 N⋅m (443 lbf⋅ft)	5.4 seconds	250 km/h (155 mph)	5.2–5.4 L/100 km (45–44 mpg_{‑US})
S 400 d 4MATIC	2017–2020	Inline 6 turbo (OM 656 DE29TT LA)	2,927 cc (178.6 cu in)	250 kW (340 PS; 335 hp)	600 N⋅m (443 lbf⋅ft)	5.2 seconds	250 km/h (155 mph)	5.6–5.7 L/100 km (42–41 mpg_{‑US})
Plug-in Hybrid engines
S 560 e	2018– 2020	V6 turbo (M 276 DE 30 A) + Electric Motor	2,999 cc (183.0 cu in)	270 kW (367 PS; 362 hp) (Engine) / 90 kW (122 PS; 121 bhp) (Electric)	500 N⋅m (369 lbf⋅ft) (Engine) / 440 N⋅m (325 lbf⋅ft) (Electric)	5.0 seconds	250 km/h (155 mph)	2.8 L/100 km (84 mpg_{‑US})

- With optional extra cost AMG Driver's Package

=== Transmission (2017–2020) ===
Model	Years	Types
S 320 (China)	2017–2020	9-speed automatic 9G-TRONIC
S 450	2017–2020	9-speed automatic 9G-TRONIC
S 450 4MATIC	2017–2020	9-speed automatic 9G-TRONIC
S 560	2017–2020	9-speed automatic 9G-TRONIC
S 560 4MATIC	2017–2020	9-speed automatic 9G-TRONIC
S 560 e Plug-In Hybrid	2018–2020	9-speed automatic 9G-TRONIC
Maybach S 560	2017–2020	9-speed automatic 9G-TRONIC
Maybach S 560 4MATIC	2017–2020	9-speed automatic 9G-TRONIC
S 600	2014–2020	7-speed automatic 7G-TRONIC Plus
S 63 AMG 4MATIC+	2013–2020	9-speed automatic AMG SPEEDSHIFT MCT
S 65 AMG	2013–2020	7-speed automatic AMG SPEEDSHIFT Plus 7G-TRONIC
Maybach S 650	2017–2020	7-speed automatic 7G-TRONIC PLUS
S 350 d	2017–2020	9-speed automatic 9G-TRONIC
S 350 d 4MATIC	2017–2020	9-speed automatic 9G-TRONIC
S 400 d	2017–2020	9-speed automatic 9G-TRONIC
S 400 d 4MATIC	2017–2020	9-speed automatic 9G-TRONIC

=== Model codes ===
Code	Model
222.057	S 400
222.058	S 450
222.059	S 450 4-MATIC
222.060	S 500
222.064	S 450 4-MATIC
222.066	S 450
222.067	S 400 4-MATIC
222.077	S 63 AMG
222.082	S 500
222.083	S 560
222.085	S 500 4-MATIC
222.086	S 560 4-MATIC
222.104	S 300 BLUETEC HYBRID/H
222.157	S 400 HYBRID/H
222.163	S 500 PLUG-IN HYBRID/E
222.173	S 560E
222.155	S 350
222.162	S 320
222.164	S 450 4-MATIC
222.165	S 400
222.166	S 450
222.167	S 400 4-MATIC
222.176	S 600
222.177	S 63 AMG
222.178	S63 AMG 4-MATIC
222.179	S 65 AMG
222.182	S 500
222.184	S 500 4-MATIC
222.185	S 500 4-MATIC
222.959	S 450 4-MATIC MAYBACH
222.964	S 450 4-MATIC
222.967	S 400 4-MATIC MAYBACH
222.969	S 500 4-MATIC MAYBACH
222.976	S 600 MAYBACH
222.980	S 650 MAYBACH
222.982	S 500 MAYBACH
222.983	S 560 MAYBACH
222.984	S 500 4-MATIC MAYBACH
222.986	S 560 4-MATIC MAYBACH
