= Mercedes-Benz M279 engine =

Mercedes-Benz M277/M279
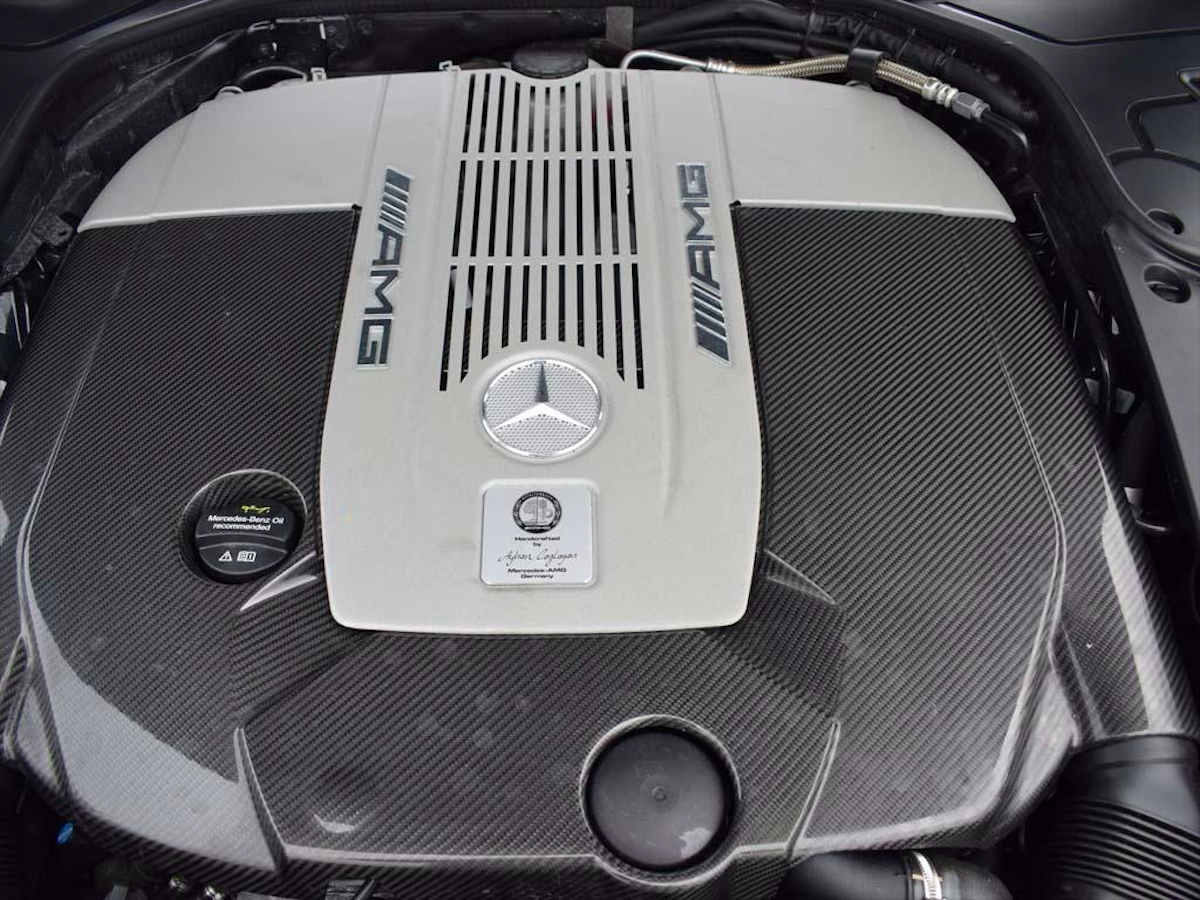

Overview
- Manufacturer: Mercedes-Benz
- Production: 2012 – present

Layout
- Configuration: 60° V12
- Displacement: 6.0 L (5,980 cc)
- Cylinder bore: 82.6 mm (3.25 in)
- Piston stroke: 93 mm (3.66 in)
- Cylinder block material: Aluminium alloy
- Cylinder head material: Aluminium alloy
- Valvetrain: SOHC 3 valves x cyl. with VVT
- Compression ratio: 9.0:1

Combustion
- Turbocharger: Twin-turbo
- Fuel system: Port injection
- Fuel type: Gasoline
- Cooling system: Water cooled

Output
- Power output: 390–463 kW (530–630 PS; 523–621 hp)
- Torque output: 830–1,000 N⋅m (612–738 lb⋅ft)

Dimensions
- Dry weight: 246 kg (542 lb)

Chronology
- Predecessor: Mercedes-Benz M275

The M279 and M277 are a series of twin-turbocharged V12 engines produced by Mercedes-Benz. It was launched in 2012 with the R231 SL65 AMG.

== Design ==
The M279 is based on the previous generation M275 engine, but has been extensively revised. It now features port injection, larger turbochargers, changes to the valvetrain timing, and a new exhaust system for improved efficiency and emissions. The M279 also uses single overhead camshafts with 3 valves per cylinder, and has an identical bore and stroke compared to before.

== M277/M279 ==
In 2012, Mercedes-Benz delivered all the rights of V12 engine development to AMG for future V12-model vehicles. Starting the 2014 model year, M279 has been extensively redesigned and updated their top-of-the-range V12 engine to better conform to increasing emission standards in Europe and the United States. Despite the basic design being more than 16 years old (M137), the new engine has enough modifications and sporting character that the engineers felt it warranted a new engine designation. According to Mercedes-Benz, the most important features of the new engine are:

- Increased displacement to 6.0 L (5,980 cc)
- New forged pistons and forged crankshaft in high-grade quenched, tempered steel
- New Engine Control Unit
- New Ignition system
- New Camshafts
- Hollow-stem sodium outlet valves
- Low-temperature cooling-water circulation system with separate expansion reservoir.

With these modifications and the addition of Mercedes-Benz's 7G-Tronic transmission on the V12 models, it is estimated that fuel economy will rise about 21% on the European cycle for the large-bodied Mercedes vehicles. Power is now at 530 PS (390 kW; 523 hp) and torque figures stay the same as the predecessor at 830 N⋅m (612 lb⋅ft).

Applications:

- 2014–2020 S 600, S 600 Maybach and Maybach Pullman (W222)
- 2021–present S 680 Maybach (W223) and armored S 680 Guard (W223)

== M279 AMG ==
The M279 AMG is based on the new and comprehensively revised M279 engine series, specially tuned for AMG 65 and Maybach 650 models. In addition to that engine's updates from the previous M275, M279 utilizes new turbochargers with an increased spiral cross-section, new exhaust manifolds, new wastegate ducts, and new cylinder heads with optimized flow characteristics to increase the engine output to 630 PS (463 kW; 621 hp) and still 1,000 N⋅m (738 lb⋅ft) of torque. The multi-spark ignition with twelve double ignition coils and a new higher performing engine management system not only results in smoother running, but also enables even more effective combustion. The effects of this is a reduction of exhaust emissions, which is also due in large extent to the optimized catalytic converter system. The newly developed AMG sports exhaust system, which has a pipe layout with enhanced flow characteristics and only equipped in the AMG models, is 3.2 kg (7.1 lb) lighter as a result of a reduction in the wall thickness. For the first time in a Mercedes-Benz passenger vehicle, the V12 is mated to a 4MATIC all-wheel-drive system in the 2021 Maybach S 680.

Applications:

- 2014–2020 AMG S 65
- 2017–2020 Maybach S 650 (Z222)
- 2015–2019 AMG S 65 Coupé/Cabriolet
- 2012–2019 AMG SL 65
- 2015–2018 AMG G 65
- 2017–2018 Maybach S 650 Cabriolet
- 2017–2018 Maybach G 650 Landaulet
- 2021–present Maybach S 680 (Z223)

== Models ==
Engine	Power	Torque	Years
M277 E60 LA	390 kW (530 PS; 523 hp) at 4,900–5,300 rpm	830 N⋅m (612 lb⋅ft) at 1,900–4,000 rpm	2014–2019
M279 E60 LA	450 kW (612 PS; 603 hp) at 4,300–5,600 rpm	1,000 N⋅m (738 lb⋅ft) at 2,300–4,300 rpm	2012–2015
M279 E60 LA	463 kW (630 PS; 621 hp) at 4,800–5,400 rpm	1,000 N⋅m (738 lb⋅ft) at 2,300–4,300 rpm	2012-2019
M279 E60 LA	450 kW (612 PS; 603 hp) at 4,300–5,600 rpm	900 N⋅m (664 lb⋅ft) at 2,300–4,300 rpm	2021–

=== M277 E60 LA (390 kW version) ===
- 2014–2019 S 600L (V222)
- 2015–2017 Mercedes-Maybach S 600 (X222)
- 2016–2018 Maybach S 600 Pullman (VV222)

=== M279 E60 LA (450 kW version) ===
- 2012–2015 G 65 AMG (W463)
- 2021–present Mercedes-Maybach S 680 4MATIC

=== M279 E60 LA (463 kW version) ===
- 2012–2018 SL 65 AMG (R231)
- 2014–2019 S 65 AMG (W222)
- 2014–2019 S 65 AMG Coupé (C217)
- 2014–2019 S 65 AMG L (V222)
- 2014–2018 G 65 AMG (W463)
- 2016–2019 S 65 AMG Cabriolet (A217)
- 2017–2019 Maybach S 650, S 680 (X222)
- 2018–2019 Maybach S 650 Pullman, S 680 Pullman (VV222)
