= Nissan Note =

Subcompact car produced by Nissan

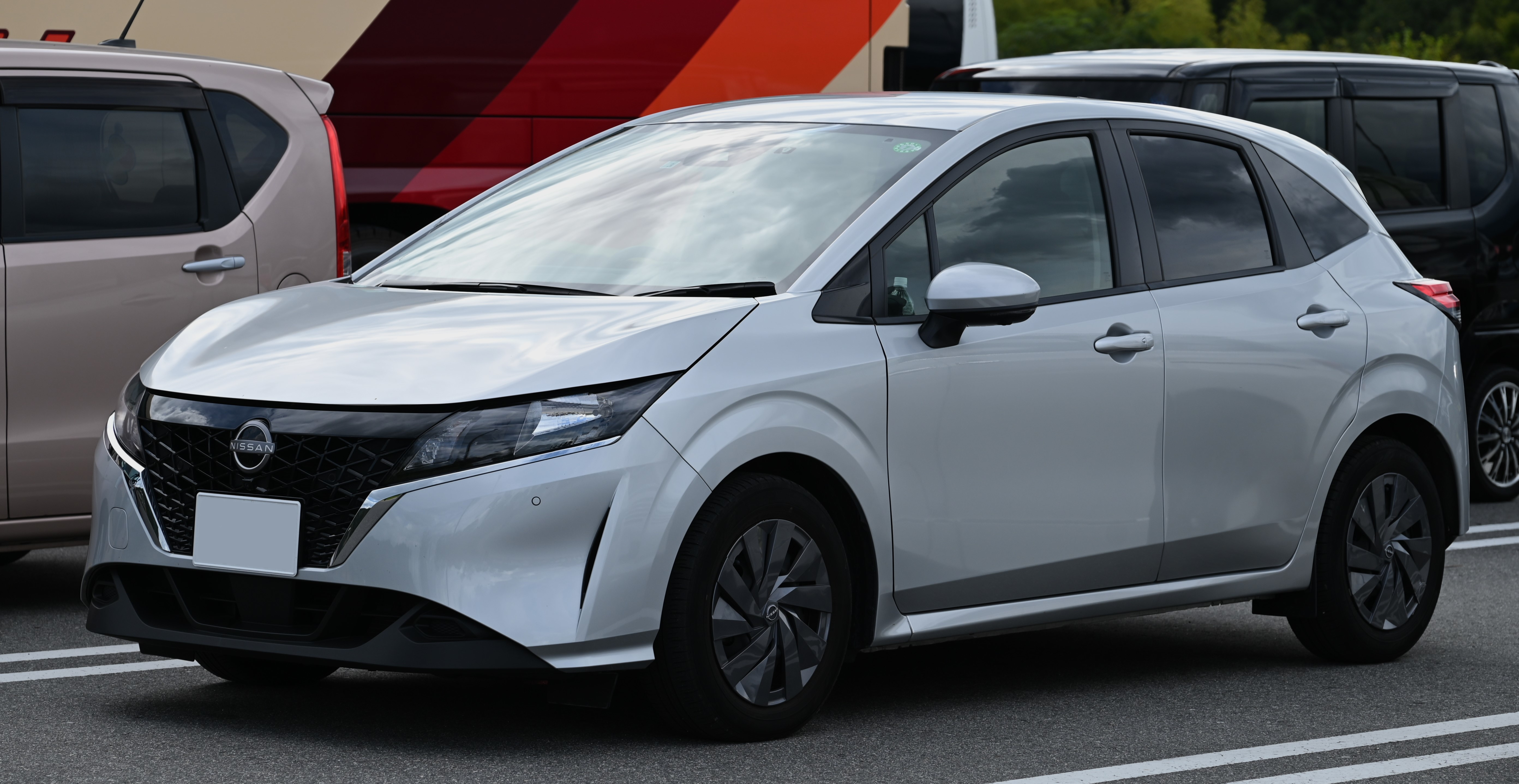
- Nissan Note (E13)

Overview
- Manufacturer: Nissan
- Also called: Nissan Versa Note (2013–2019)
- Production: 2004–present

Body and chassis
- Class: Mini MPV (B) (2004–2019); Subcompact car (B) (2020–present)
- Body style: 5-door hatchback
- Layout: Front-engine, front-wheel-drive Front-engine, four-wheel-drive (Japan only)

Chronology
- Predecessor: Nissan Almera Tino

The Nissan Note (Japanese: 日産・ノート, Hepburn: Nissan Nōto) is a supermini/subcompact hatchback or a mini MPV manufactured and marketed globally by Nissan. Introduced in 2004, the first-generation Note was primarily marketed in Japan and Europe, and was produced in Japan and the United Kingdom. The second-generation model was sold in other regions, including North America where it was manufactured in Mexico and marketed as the Versa Note, and Thailand, where it serves as one of the B-segment hatchback offered by the brand alongside the smaller March/Micra under the Eco Car tax scheme.

In 2017, the second-generation Note was replaced by the French-built K14 Micra for the European market. The Versa Note was discontinued in North America in 2019 due to the decreasing demand for subcompact hatchbacks in the region. It continued to be produced and sold in Japan up to the introduction of the third-generation Note in late 2020.

The Note was introduced with a series hybrid drivetrain in late 2016 as the Note e-Power. Due to its popularity and the push of electrification, the third-generation Note is only available with the e-Power drivetrain, with a WLTC fuel economy of 29.5 kilometres per litre (69 mpg_{‑US}).

== First generation (E11; 2004) ==
First generation
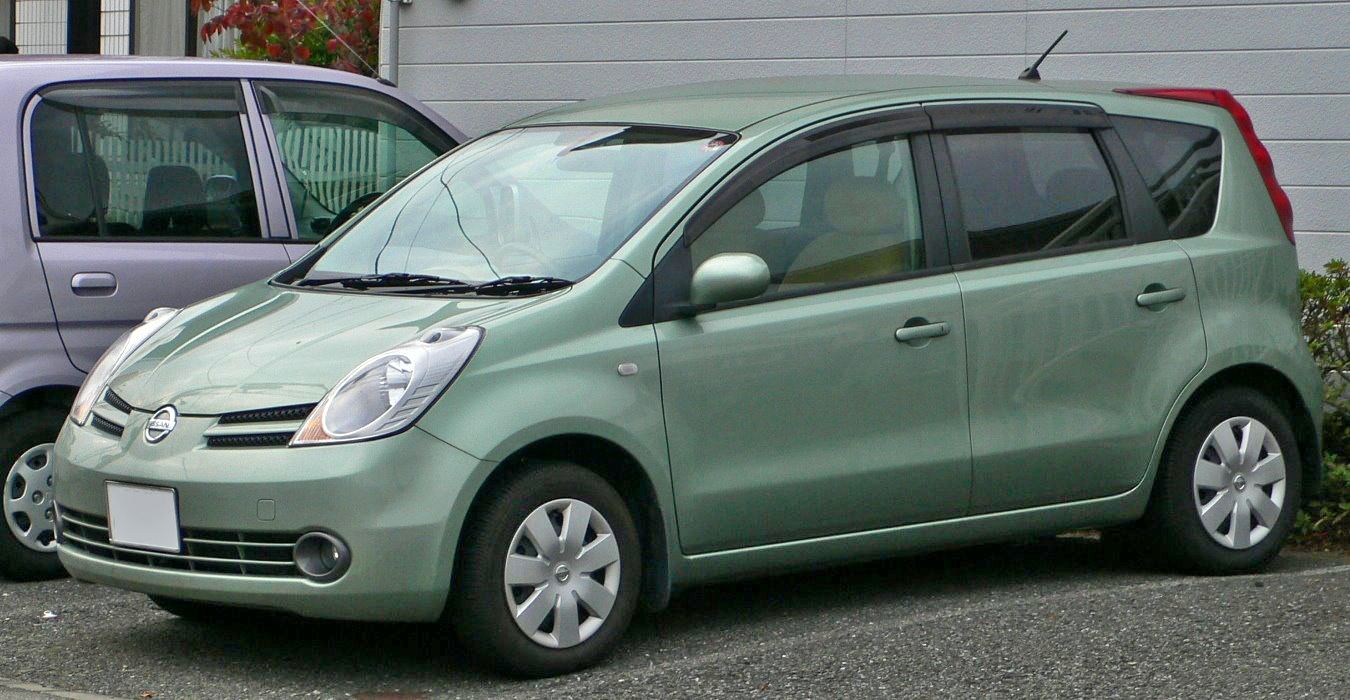
- 2005 Nissan Note (Japan, pre-facelift)

Overview
- Model code: E11
- Production: December 2004 – 2013
- Assembly: Japan: Yokosuka, Kanagawa (Oppama Plant); United Kingdom: Sunderland (NMUK)
- Designer: Taiji Toyota

Body and chassis
- Platform: Nissan B platform
- Related: Nissan Livina (L10/L11); Nissan AD/Wingroad (Y12); Nissan Tiida/Latio/Versa (C11)

Powertrain
- Engine: Petrol: 1.4 L CR14DE I4; 1.5 L HR15DE I4; 1.6 L HR16DE I4; Diesel: 1.5 K9K dCi I4 turbo
- Transmission: 5-speed manual 4-speed Jatco RE4F03A automatic (Europe); Jatco RE0F08A/JF009E CVT (Japan)

Dimensions
- Wheelbase: 2,600 mm (102.4 in)
- Length: 4,083 mm (160.7 in)
- Width: 1,690 mm (66.5 in)
- Height: 1,545–1,550 mm (60.8–61.0 in)
- Curb weight: 1,150–1,250 kg (2,535–2,756 lb)

=== Development ===
Due to poor sales of the Almera Tino, which had sold 200,000 cars in 7 years compared to its main rival, the Renault Scénic, which had sold 1,400,000 cars after the introduction of its second-generation model, Nissan began development of what would later become the Note in summer 2002. At the 2004 Paris Motor Show, the Nissan Tone concept was unveiled. While similar to the production model, the concept has some unique features such as a U-shaped panoramic roof, large dashboard screen, automatic gearbox, and always had its rear doors locked.

Chris Lee, Nissan's product manager, says that millions of dollars were invested in development and that the Note was meant to be sold under €13,000.

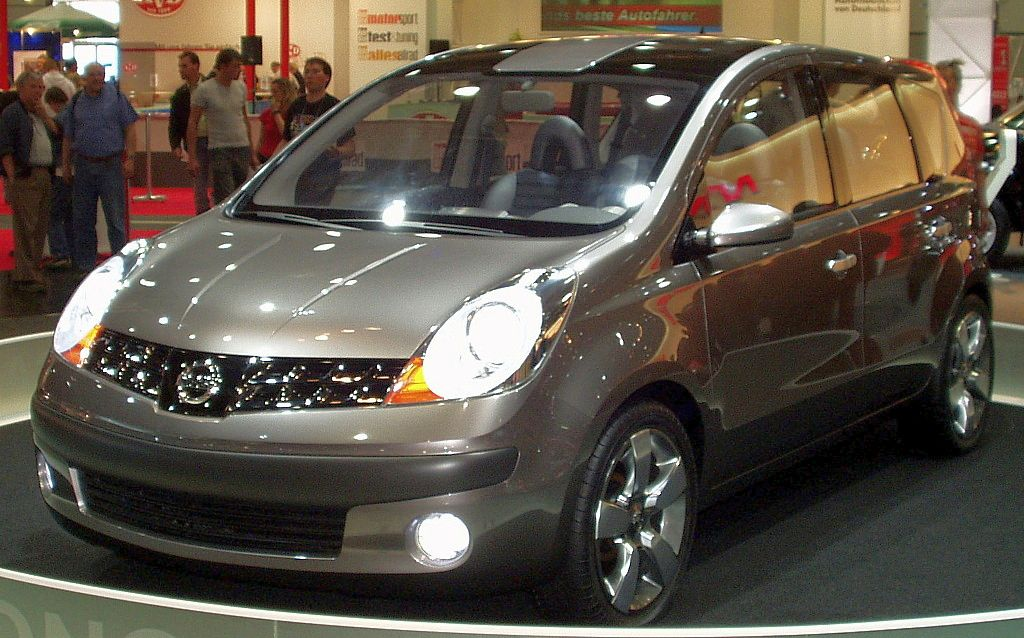
Nissan Tone Concept

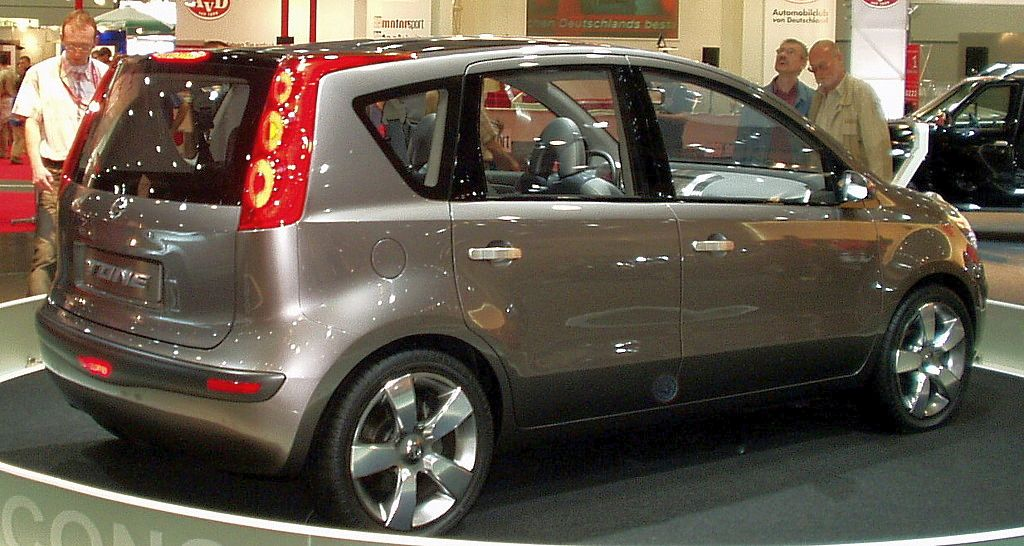
Nissan Tone Concept

=== Production model (2005) ===
The production version was unveiled and went on sale on 20 January 2005 in Japan. The European model was unveiled at the 2005 Frankfurt Motor Show, followed by the 2006 Geneva Motor Show. Retail models went on sale in Europe in early 2006. The United Kingdom was the first market to have the Note launch, being released on 1 March 2006. The car shares some of its underpinnings with the Renault Modus, and manufactured at Nissan's plant in Washington, England. Early models included a choice of four engines, which are a 1.4-litre and 1.6-litre petrol; and two options of a 1.5-litre diesel. It is an indirect successor to the conventional medium-sized Almera hatchback for the region.

The trim levels for the European market were the S, SE and SVE, later replaced by Visia, Visia+, Acenta, Acenta R, and Tekna. In the Russia/CIS region, the Note was sold with Comfort, Luxury, and Tekna trim levels. Cars made for this market before 2009 have standard OBDII diagnostics.

Japanese version

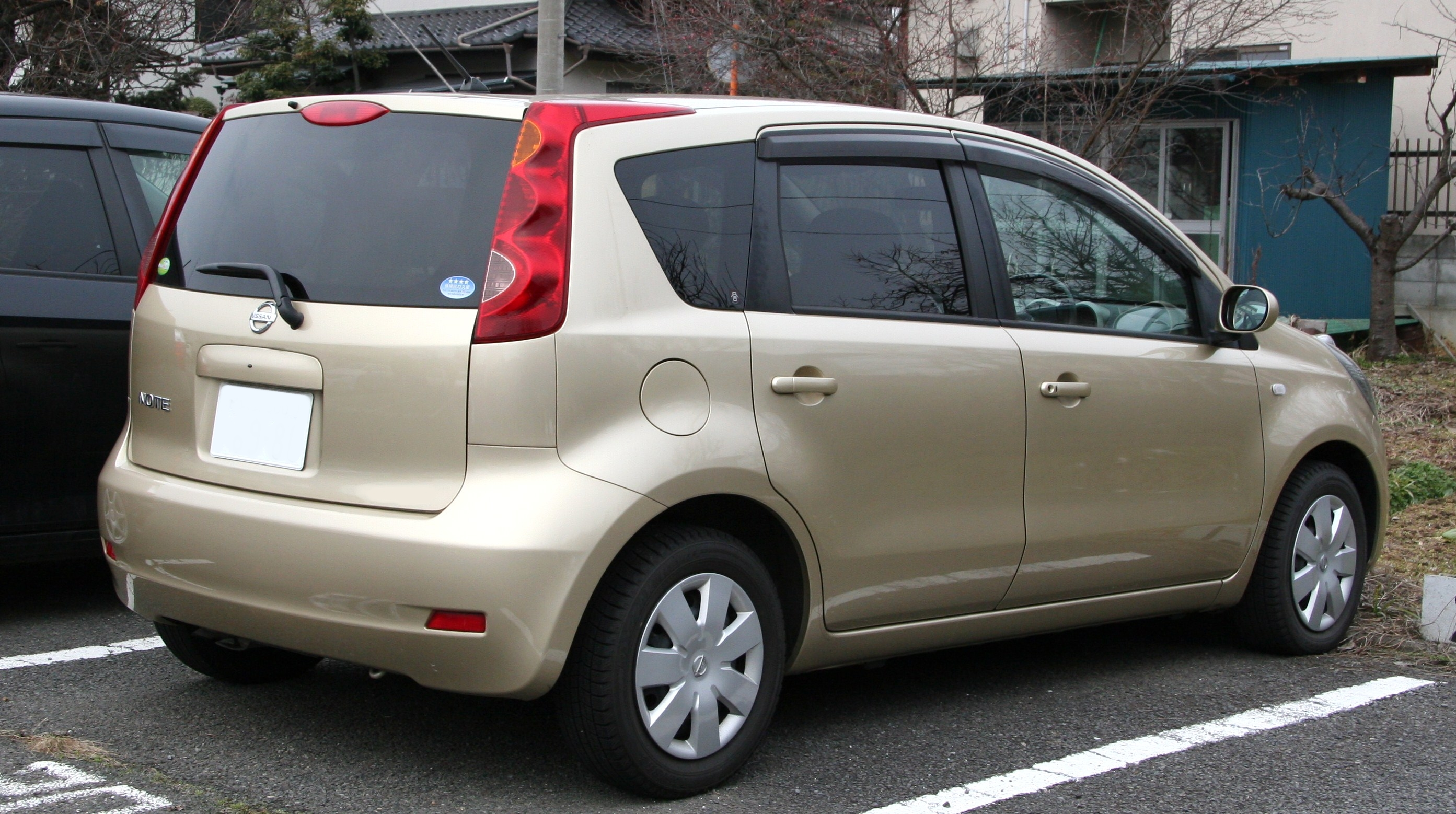
2005–2008 Nissan Note (Japan, pre-facelift)

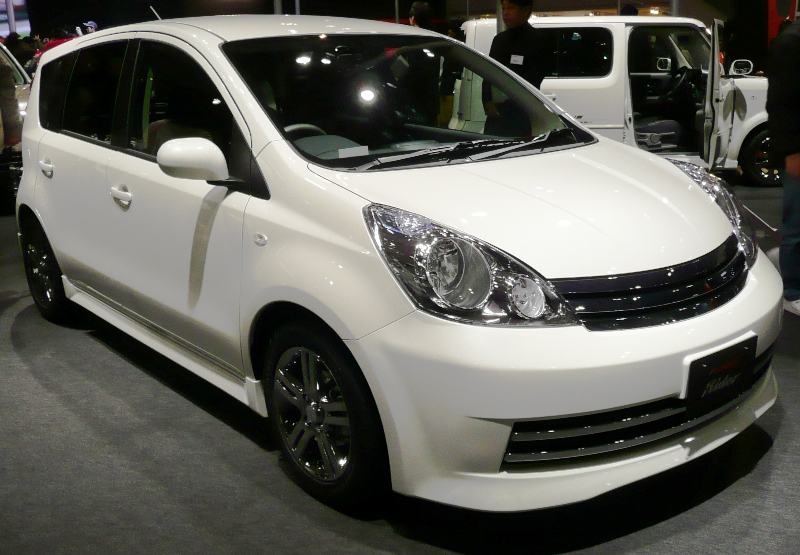
Nissan Note Rider

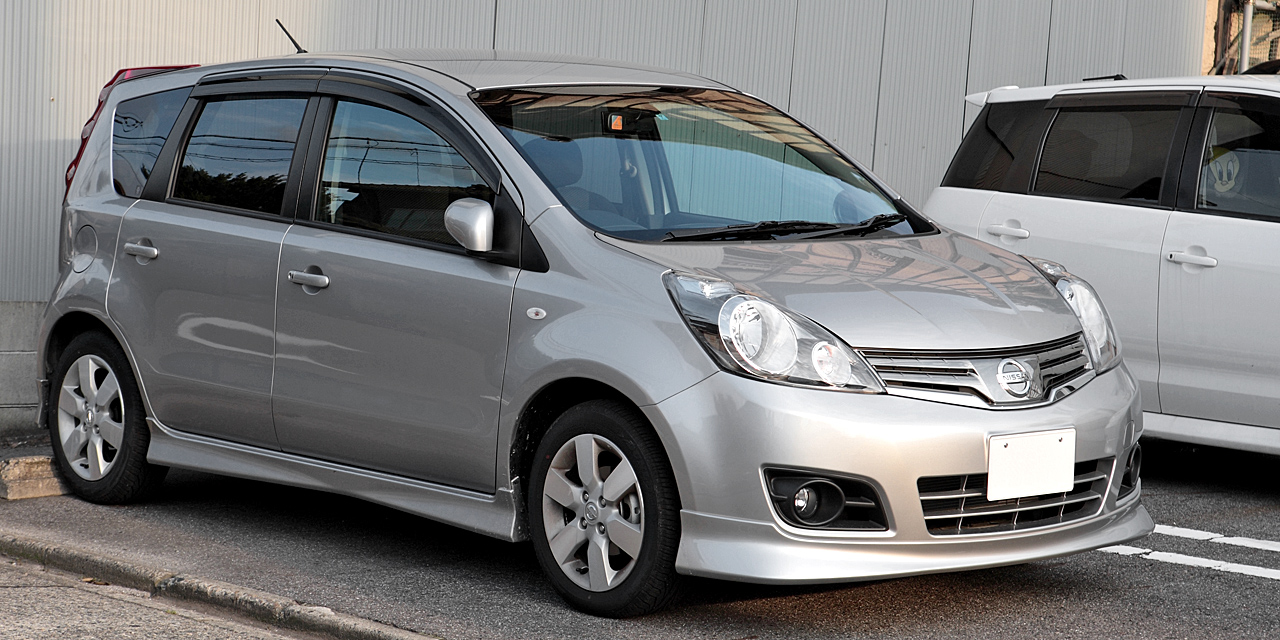
Facelift Nissan Note (with optional accessories)

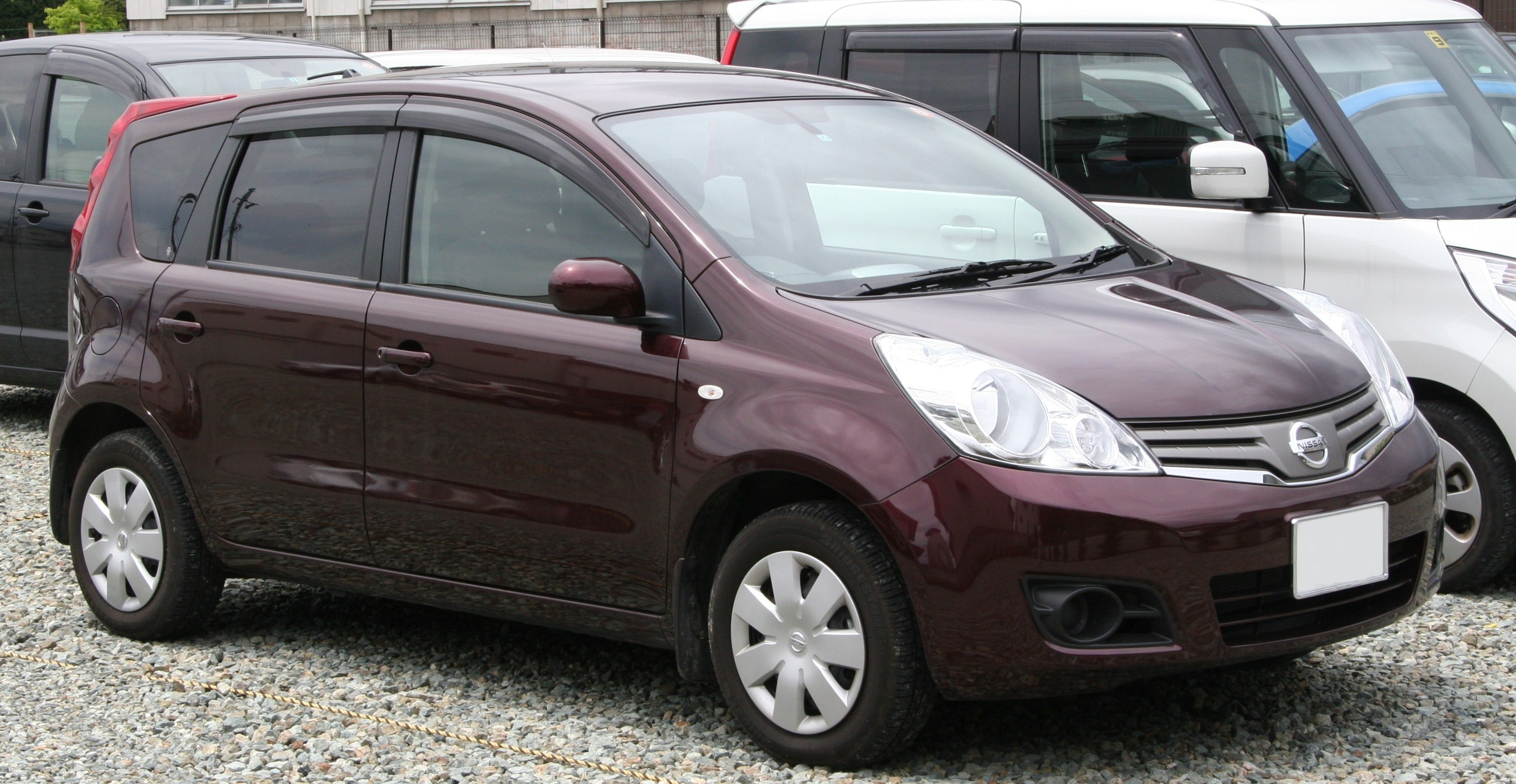
2008 Nissan Note (Japan, facelift)

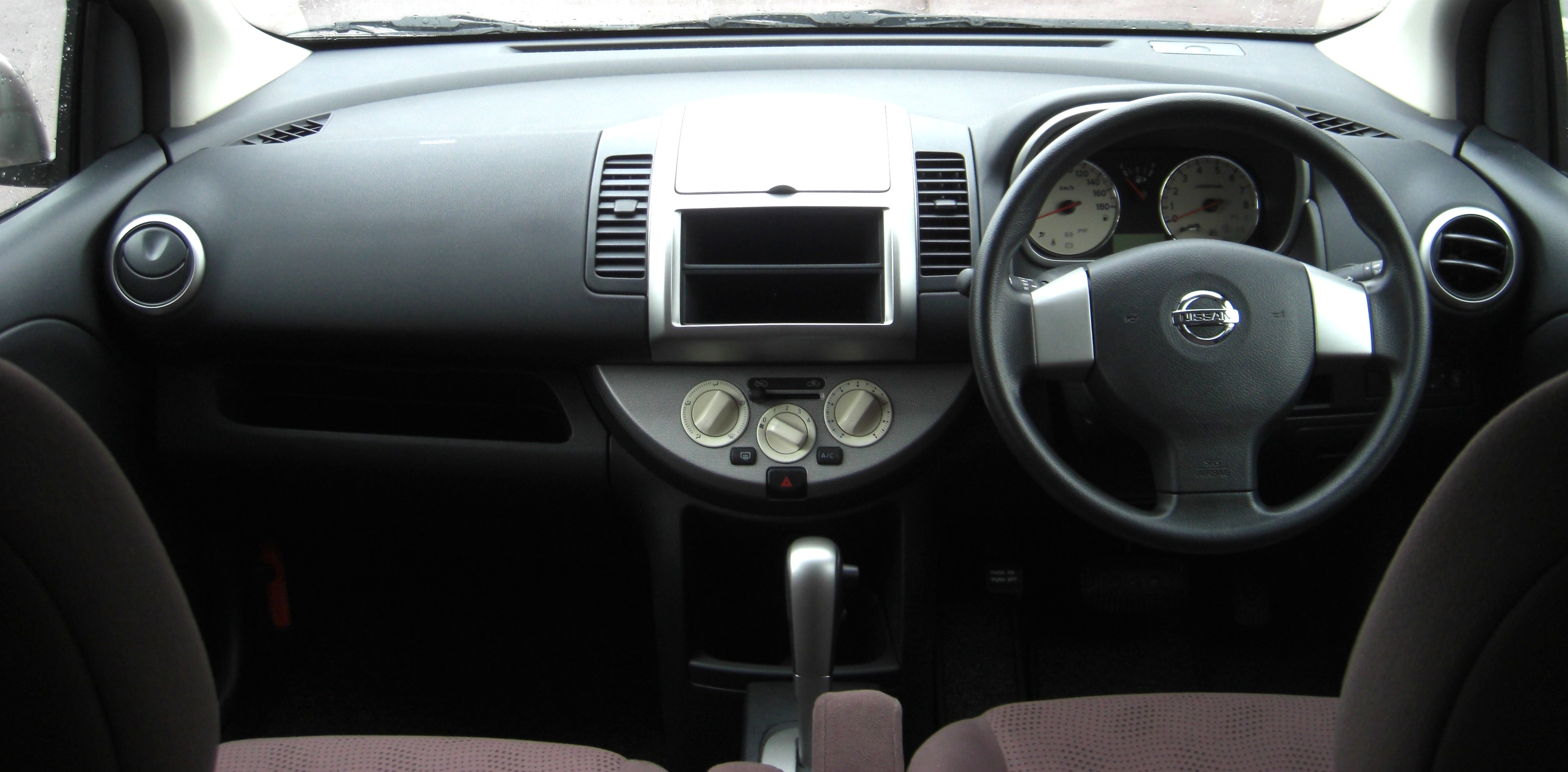
Interior

European version

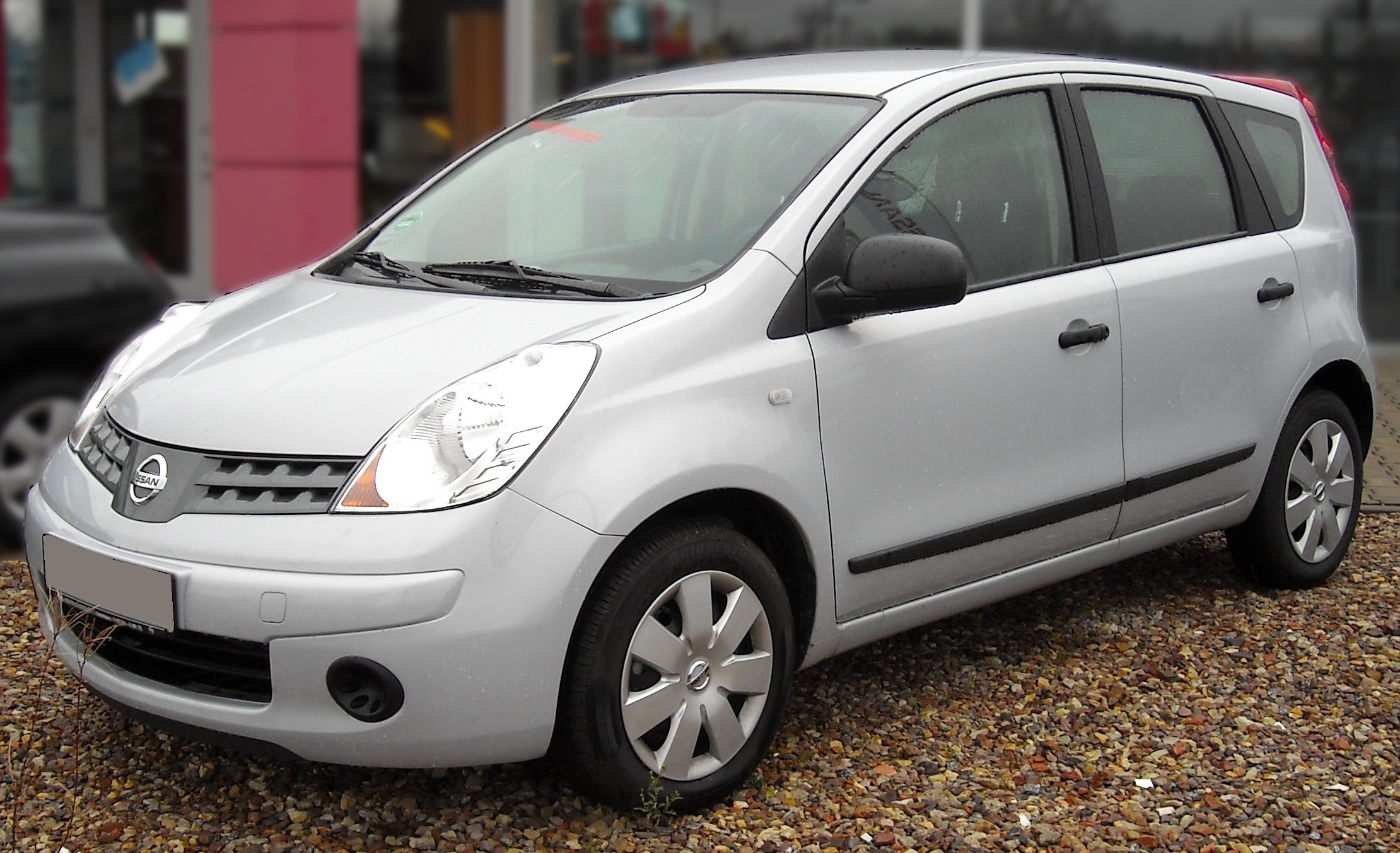
2007–2008 Nissan Note (Europe, pre-facelift)

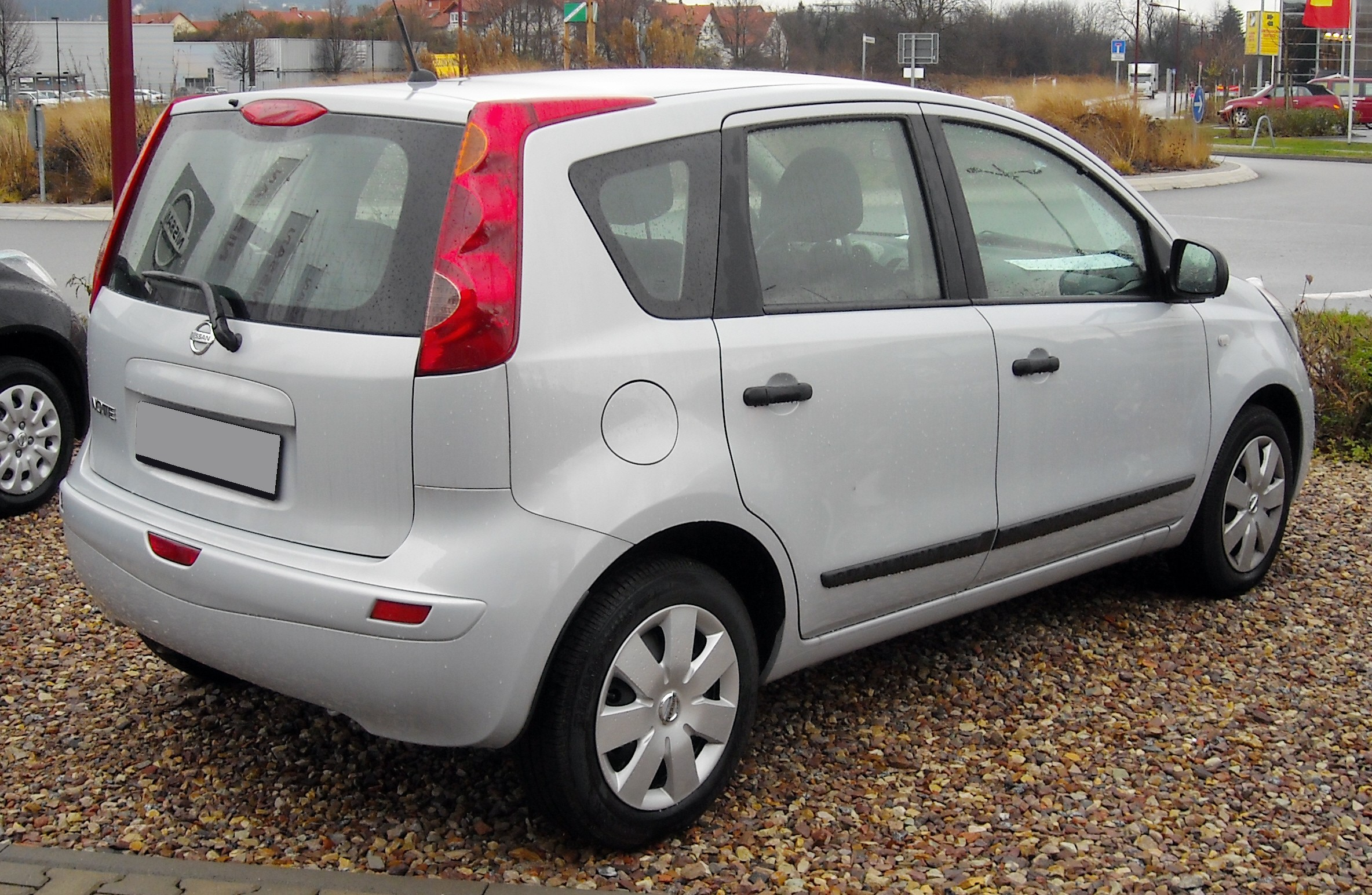
2007–2008 Nissan Note (Europe, pre-facelift)

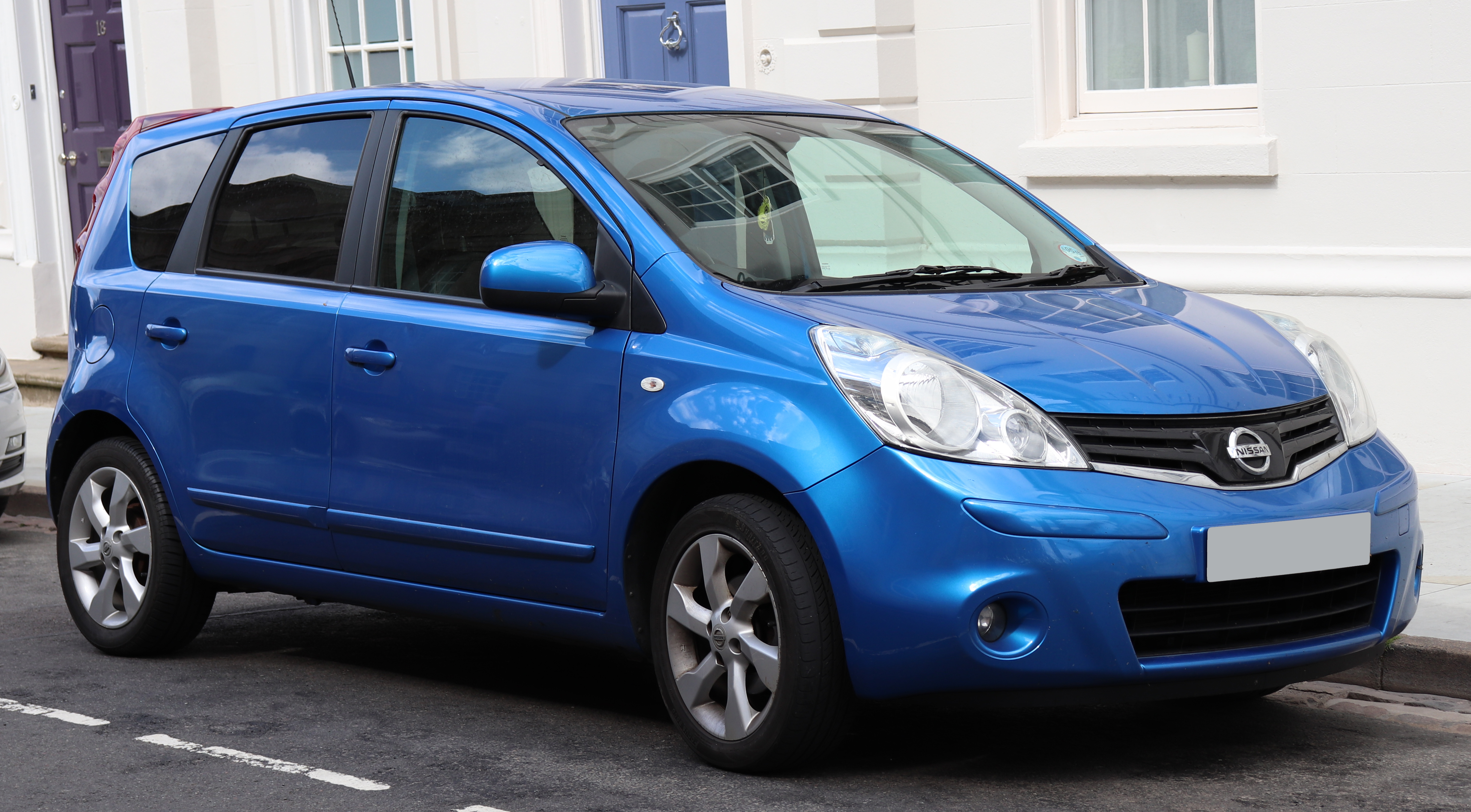
2009 Nissan Note (Europe, facelift)

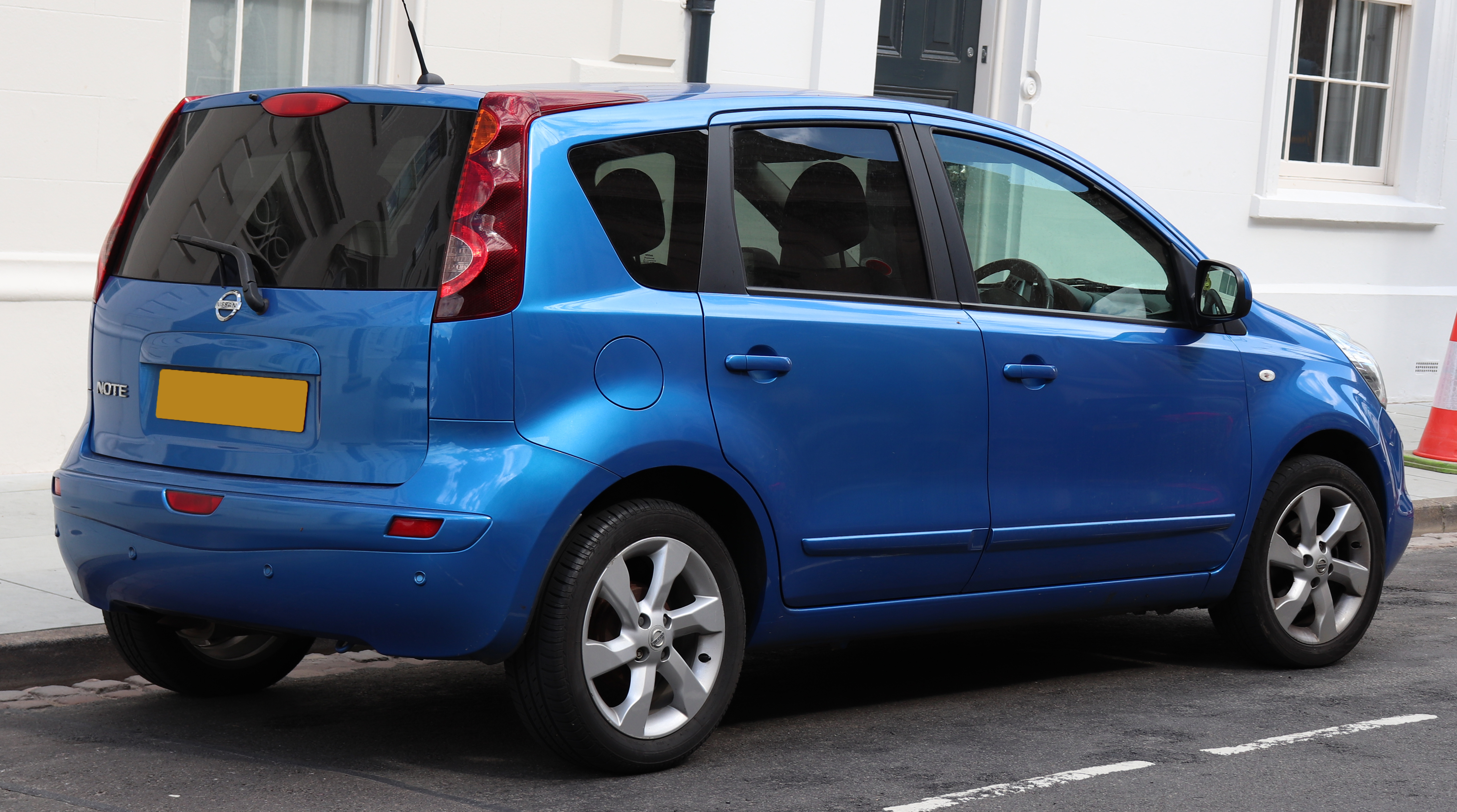
2009 Nissan Note (Europe, facelift)

=== Safety ===
Euro NCAP test results* Nissan Note, 1.4 Acenta (2006)
Test	Score	Rating
Adult occupant:		4 /5 stars
Pedestrian:		2 /4 stars

=== Production ===
Production of the European Note began in January 2006 at the Sunderland plant in the UK.

The Note was produced in Nissan's Oppama Plant.

=== Marketing ===
A CD single called 'C'mon Everybody Note&Pencils' was released by Pony Canyon on 9 August 2006, which included Eddie Cochran's C'mon Everybody (original, DJ UTO remix, instrumental) used in the Nissan Note commercial premiered on 12 May 2006. The CD cover shows a Marine Blue Note 15S V package drawing on a 50m x 40m notebook with blue tire tracks. The Note commercial was performed by Toshihiro Yashiba of JFCT INC.

=== 2007 facelift (for EU-made models) ===
In 2007, the Note received a mid-cycle facelift. Both bumpers are now fully painted, the radio antenna is now at the rear of the roof, and the headlamp washer lost its dedicated button and become fully automatic which lead to excessive cleaner fluid consumption. New radio models were offered and some less significant and invisible changes were made.

=== 2008 update (only Japanese-made models) ===
Changes to the Note include a redesigned head lamp, engine hood, front grille, front bumper coloured/gun metallic front grille on G/X series models, smoke plated front grille on sporty series models,3 new colours (blue turquoise titan pearl metallic, frost green titan metallic, amethyst grey pearl metallic) for total of 10 body colour choices, new seat and door trim options sand beige, black, carbon black (with red stitching), sand beige interior includes colour scheme change, 2-link meter (LCD odometer, trim trip meter with fuel consumption display) as standard equipment, sporty series (15RX/15RS) includes white meter, dimpled leather-wrapped 3-spoke steering wheel with red stitching (standard in 15RX), rear centre arm rest with 2 cup holders (standard in 15G, 15G FOUR, 15RX) water spray seats (standard in 15G, 15G FOUR), cold terrain vehicles include 4-wheel drive as standard equipment, driver seat seat belt reminder as standard equipment, 2-wheel drive models with HR15DE engine and Xtronic CVT transmission passed JC08 model fuel consumption and emission tests.

Japanese models went on sale on 16 January 2008. Early models include 15X F package, 15X, 15G, 15RS, 15RX, 15X FOUR F package, 15X FOUR, and 15G FOUR.

European model was unveiled at the 2008 Paris Motor Show. The 1.5-litre dCi engine models went on sale in September 2008, followed by 1.4-litre petrol engine models in October 2008.

==== 2010 Nissan Note update (EU-made models only) ====
European second facelift/restyle models went on sale in the late 2010 as 2011 model year vehicles. Early models had a choice of 3 engines (1.5-litre dCi turbo diesel engine (N/A in CIS/Russia), 1.4-litre with 65 kW (88 hp), and a 1.6-litre with 81 kW (110 hp) petrol), choice of 10 body colours (a metallic red and a metallic grey - added to replace three outgoing colours; two solid colours and 8 metallics). Many changes were made to the interior and exterior. The lights, bumpers, grille, and dashboard were significantly changed. Nissan Connect Radio/Navi offered as option for high trim levels. AT software was tuned to stay on the safe side while ATF is not warm enough.

==== Nissan Note 15X SV +Plasma, 15X FOUR SV +Plasma (2011-2012 Japanese-made models only) ====
There are versions of Nissan Note 15X SV and 15X FOUR SV for the Japanese market, with intelligent air conditioning system with 1-touch clean switch.

The vehicles went on sale on 30 June 2011.

==== Marketing ====
As part of the 2008 Note launch in Japan, a series of television commercials based on The World of GOLDEN EGGS characters was produced. The corresponding web site opened on 21 December 2007, followed by the 1st television commercial premiere in January 2008, and the opening of a special Nissan Note web site with The World of GOLDEN EGGS characters.

As part of the 2009 Note market launch in Japan, a series of animated commercials were premiered on 20 May 2009. The commercial was inspired by the Heidi, Girl of the Alps animated series, featuring Junichi Koumoto and Tomochika (as Heidi). The series was produced by Studio Crocodile Inc.

=== 2012 update (EU models only) ===
UK models included:

- Acenta model includes new 'diamond cut' two-tone 16-inch alloy wheels, replacing the original 15-inch units. Colour-coded door mirror covers, chrome front fog light surrounds, new seat fabric with blue stitching, climate control, automatic headlights, and rain-sensitive wipers became standard equipment. The N-TEC model includes darkened rear privacy glass and the touch screen 'Connect' satellite navigation system. The N-TEC+ model includes rear parking sensors, choice of 1.4, 1.6 petrol and 1.5 dCi engines.

UK models went on sale in February 2012. Since beginning of 2012 and till the end of E11 production in 2013 at least in Russian marketed models/trims Nissan silently excluded seat belt pretensioners without any prior notes. Furthermore, seat belt pretensioners was listed in all the dealer offers and contracts while some people found no installed pretensioners on their places upon seat dismount. Later NM Russia acknowledged the lack of pretensioners in Nissan Note 2012–2013.

=== Production ===
As of 16 July 2012, Nissan has sold 940,000 units of the Note.

=== Note inspired by Adidas (2005) ===
It is a version of the Nissan Note inspired by multi-sports brand Adidas, with user-changeable treatment on the front/rear bumpers; fabrics and rubber materials used on dashboard, door trim, etc.

The vehicle was unveiled at the 2005 Tokyo Motor Show.

=== Autech Note Rider ===
A sporty-oriented model handled by Autech was released in January 2005. The vehicle was unveiled at the 2006 Tokyo Auto Salon.

A special edition model, the Rider Alpha II, based on the Rider V Package handled by Autech. It was released in May 2006, with limited sale until march 2007. It was equipped with illuminated kicking plates, bi-xenon headlights, exclusive aluminium pedals, and Rider's billet front grille.

In 2008, a new grade Autech Rider Performance spec was added.

The Autech Rider Blackline was released in 19 October 2011. It is based from the Rider 15X SV, it was features a exclusive dark chrome front grille, dark chrome bumper grille, exclusive dark emblem, intelligent air conditioning system, exclusive sports muffler (by FUJITSUBO) and exclusive pumper finisher.

== Second generation (E12; 2012) ==
Second generation
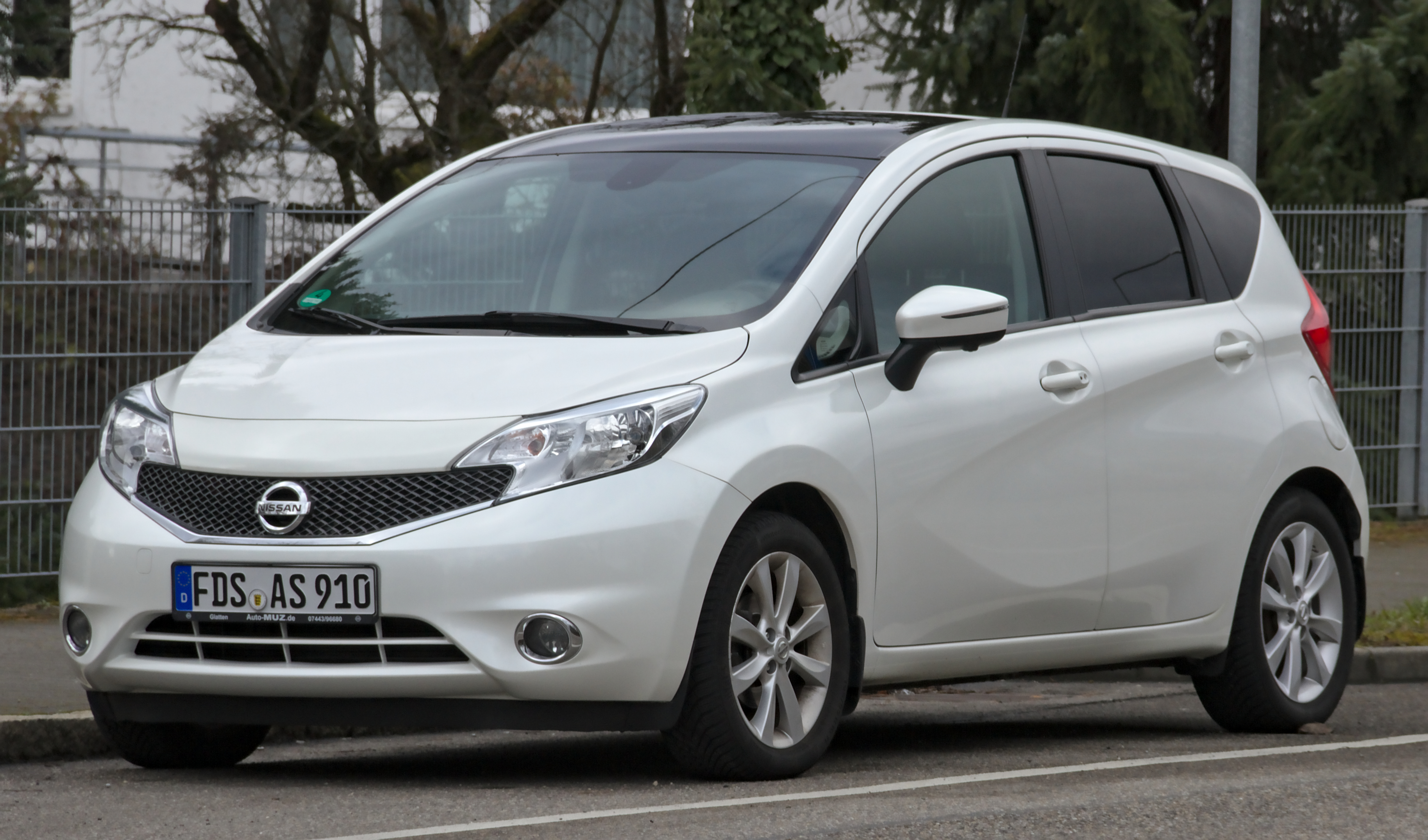

Overview
- Model code: E12
- Also called: Nissan Versa Note (North America)
- Production: August 2012 – December 2020 (Japan); 2012–2017 (United Kingdom); 2013–2019 (Mexico); 2017–2022 (Thailand)
- Model years: 2014–2019 (North America)
- Assembly: Japan: Yokosuka, Kanagawa (Oppama Plant); Kanda, Fukuoka (Kyushu Plant); United Kingdom: Sunderland (NMUK); Mexico: Aguascalientes; Thailand: Samut Prakan
- Designer: Atsushi Maeda

Body and chassis
- Platform: Nissan V platform
- Related: Nissan Micra/March (K13); Nissan Almera/Latio/Sunny/Versa (N17)

Powertrain
- Engine: Petrol: 1.2 L HR12DE I3; 1.2 L HR12DDR I3; 1.6 L HR16DE I4; Petrol hybrid: 1.2 L HR12DE e-Power I3 + electric motor; Diesel: 1.5 L K9K I4
- Electric motor: 2× EM57 High Power 96 kW (129 hp; 131 PS), 254 N⋅m (187 lb⋅ft) AC synchronous (e-Power)
- Transmission: Xtronic CVT; 5-speed manual Single speed constant ratio (e-Power)
- Hybrid drivetrain: Series hybrid (e-Power)

Dimensions
- Wheelbase: 2,600 mm (102.4 in)
- Length: 4,100 mm (161.4 in)
- Width: 1,695 mm (66.7 in)
- Height: 1,525–1,535 mm (60.0–60.4 in)

Chronology
- Predecessor: Nissan Tiida (Japan); Nissan Versa hatchback (North America); Nissan Livina (Asia); Nissan Almera (Europe)
- Successor: Nissan Micra (K14) (Europe); Nissan Versa (N18) (Americas)

=== Invitation Concept ===
Showcased in 2012 at the 82nd Geneva Motor Show, the Invitation Concept is a hatchback concept built on the V platform, designed to be sold alongside the Micra and Juke. It featured a swage line at the side body panel, independent front MacPherson struts with coil springs, torsion beam rear axle, Around View Monitor (AVM) safety technology, and the Nissan Safety Shield System.

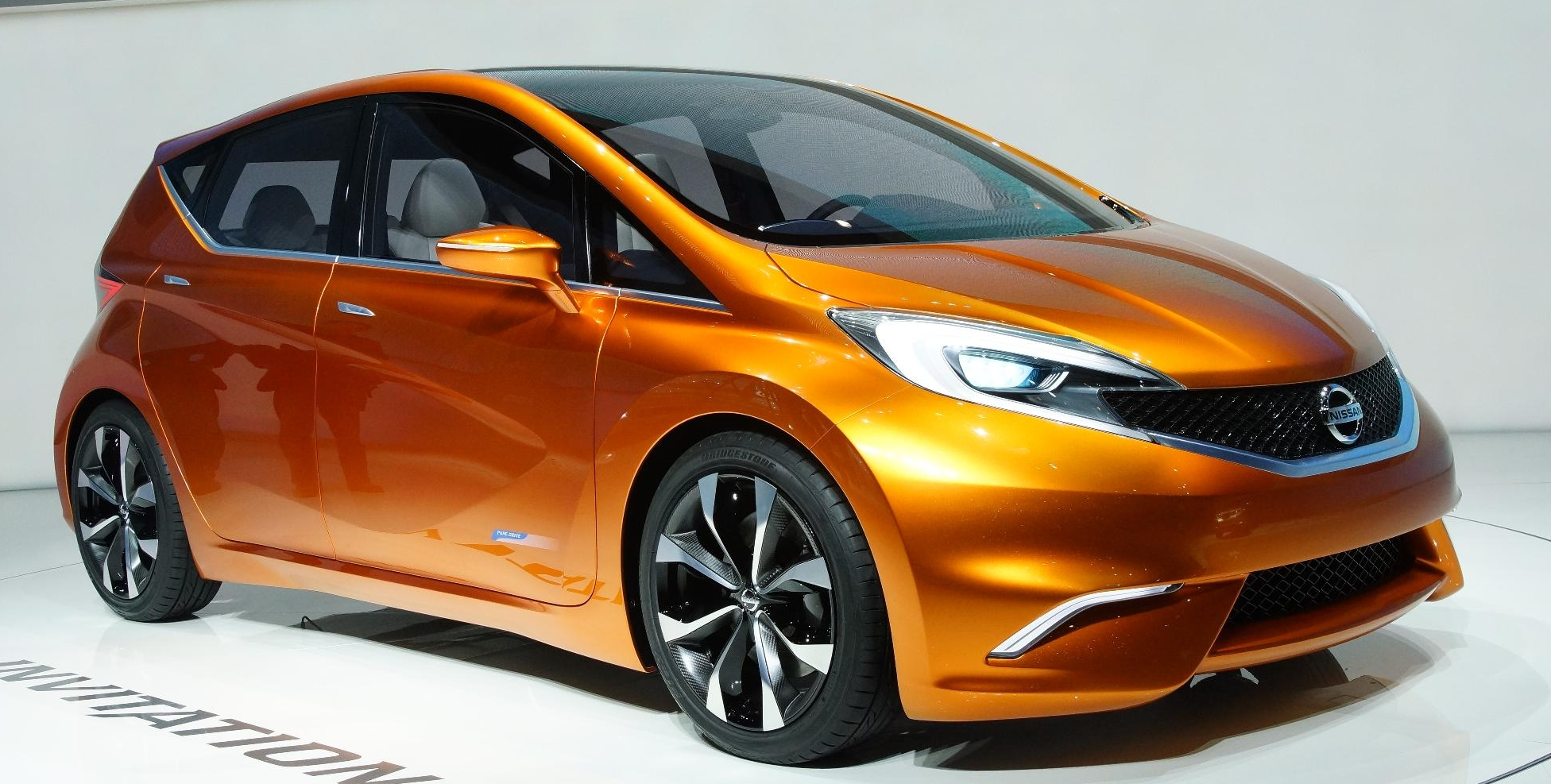
Front view

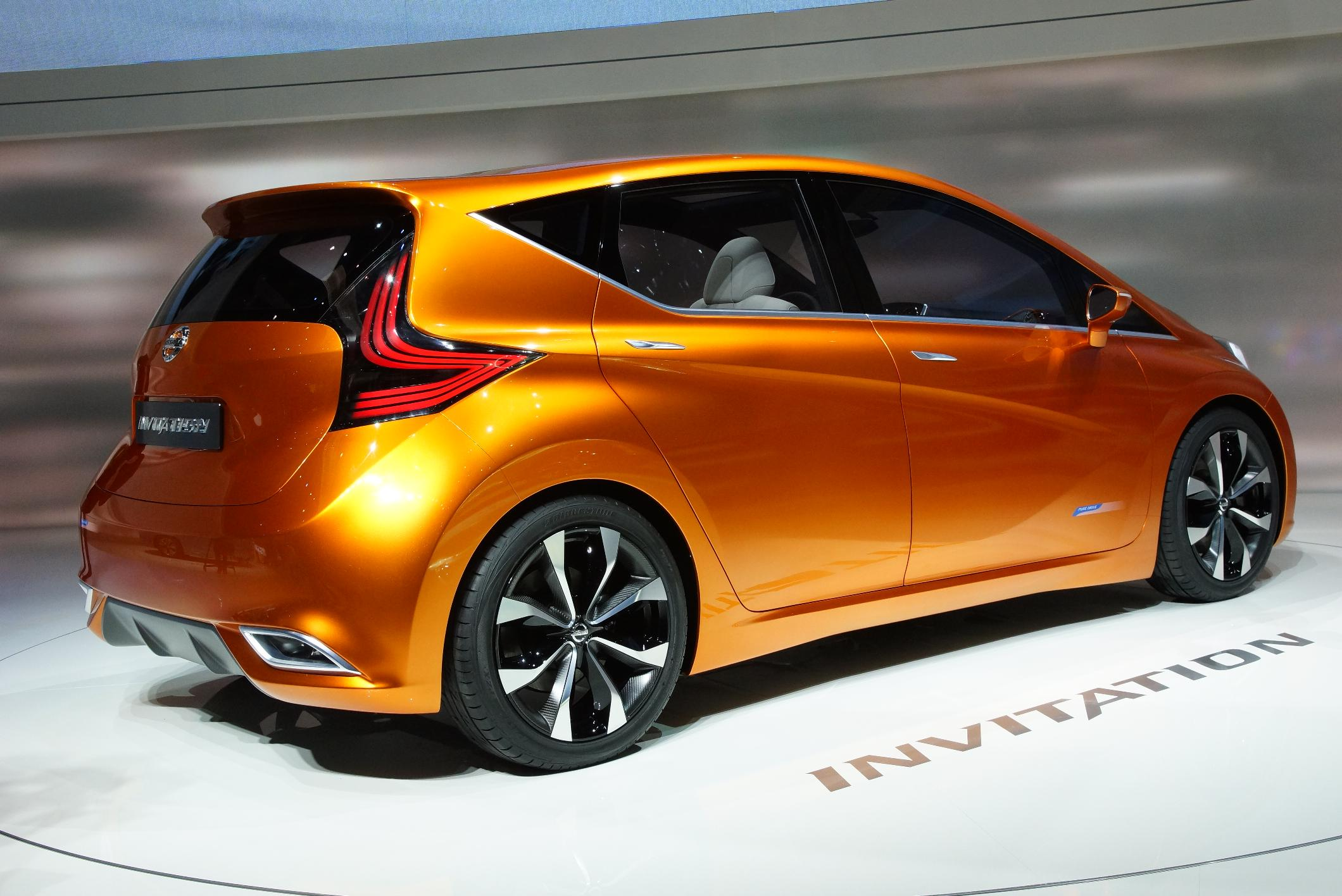
Rear view

=== Initial release ===
The second generation Note was based on the Nissan Invitation concept.

The vehicle was unveiled at the Osanbashi venue in Yokohama, followed by the Nissan Gallery on 28 August 2012.

The European model was unveiled at the 83rd Geneva Motor Show.

The Latin American model was unveiled at the Port of Cartagena de Indias in Colombia.

It would replace the Livina for other countries' markets (except China and parts of Asia) in 2013.

Japanese models went on sale on 3 September 2012. Early Note models include a choice of HR12DE (S, X, X FOUR) and HR12DDR (S DIG-S, X DIG-S, MEDALIST) engines, and Xtronic CVT transmission. Early Note Rider models include a choice of HR12DE (X, X FOUR) and HR12DDR (X DIG-S) engines, and Xtronic CVT transmission. The width dimension is kept under 1700mm on all international models so that versions in Japan would be in compliance with Japanese Government dimension regulations with engine displacement kept under 2000cc.

Hong Kong models went on sale on 21 September 2012. Early models included DIG-S with HR12DDR engine, XTRONIC CVT transmission, and ISS idle mode.

The Note was launched in Singapore on 14 January 2013. It features a 1.2L DIG-S engine that delivers driving performance equivalent to a 1.5-litre engine.

Latin American models went on sale in July 2013. Early models included Sense (manual and CVT) and Advance (manual and CVT).

European models went on sale in summer 2013, with deliveries beginning in autumn 2013. Early models include a choice of 3 engines (1.2-litre 80PS petrol, 1.2-litre 98PS DIG-S petrol, 1.5-litre 90PS turbo diesel), manual or CVT transmission, and 3 trim levels (Visia, Acenta, and Tekna).

Nissan said the drag coefficient is 0.298. The frontal area is 2.13 m^{2}, making the drag area CdA 0.639 m^{2}.

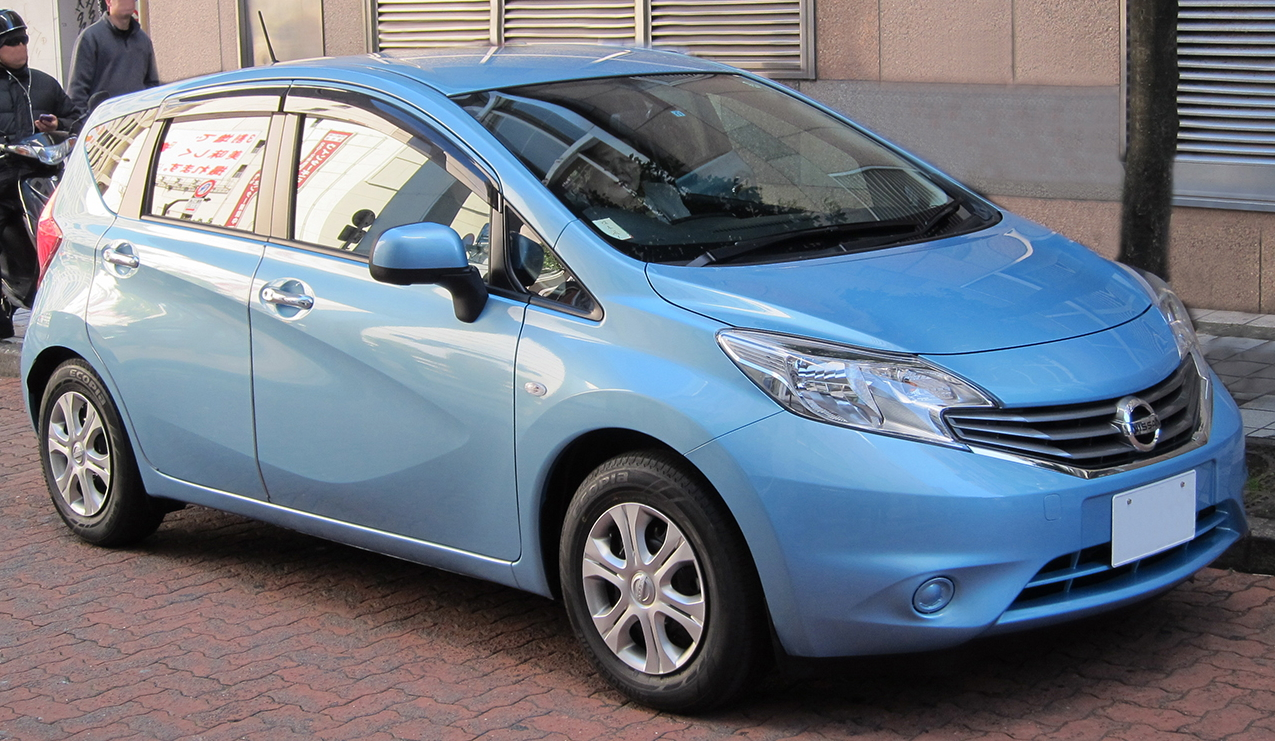
Nissan Note (Japan)

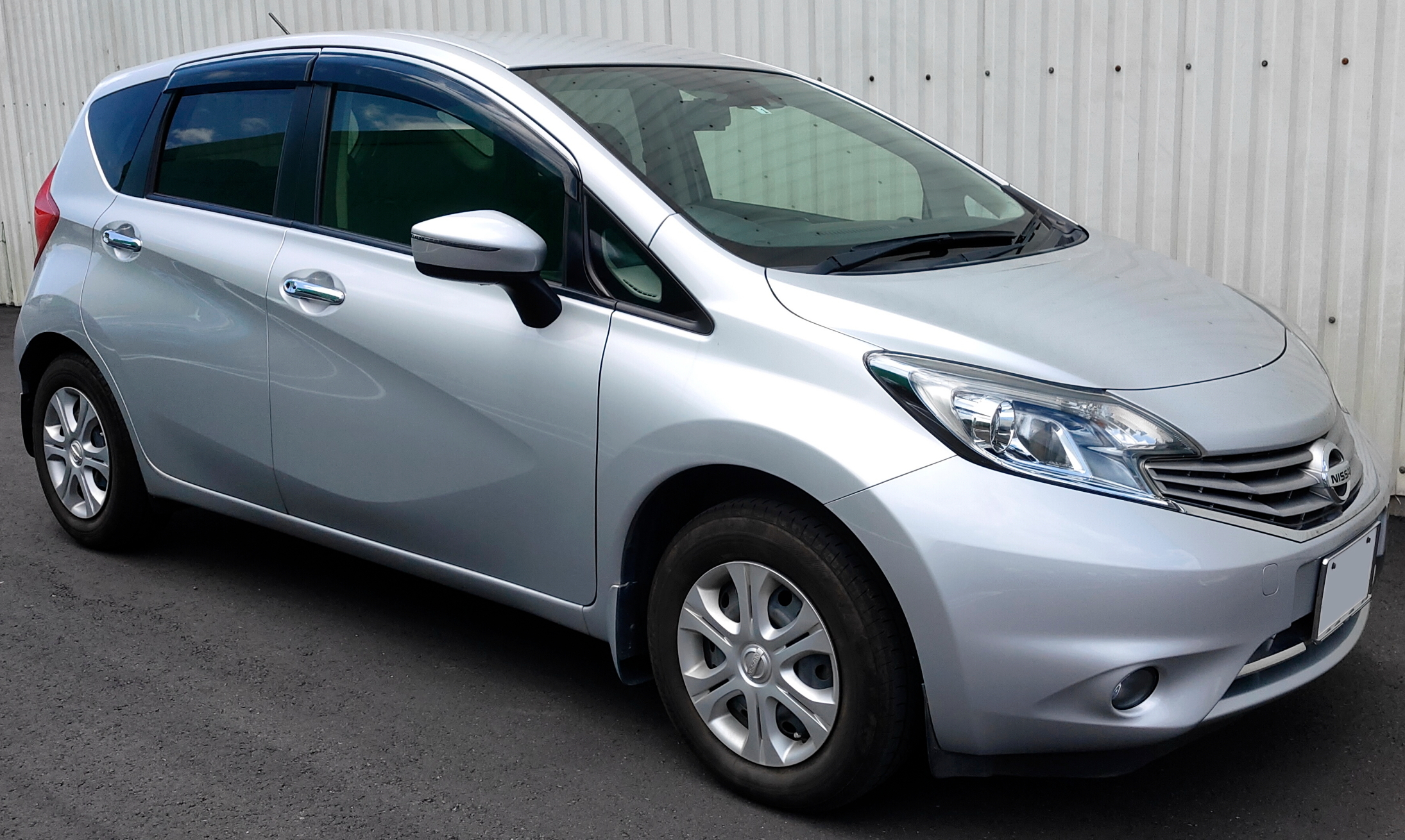
Nissan Note Medalist (Japan)

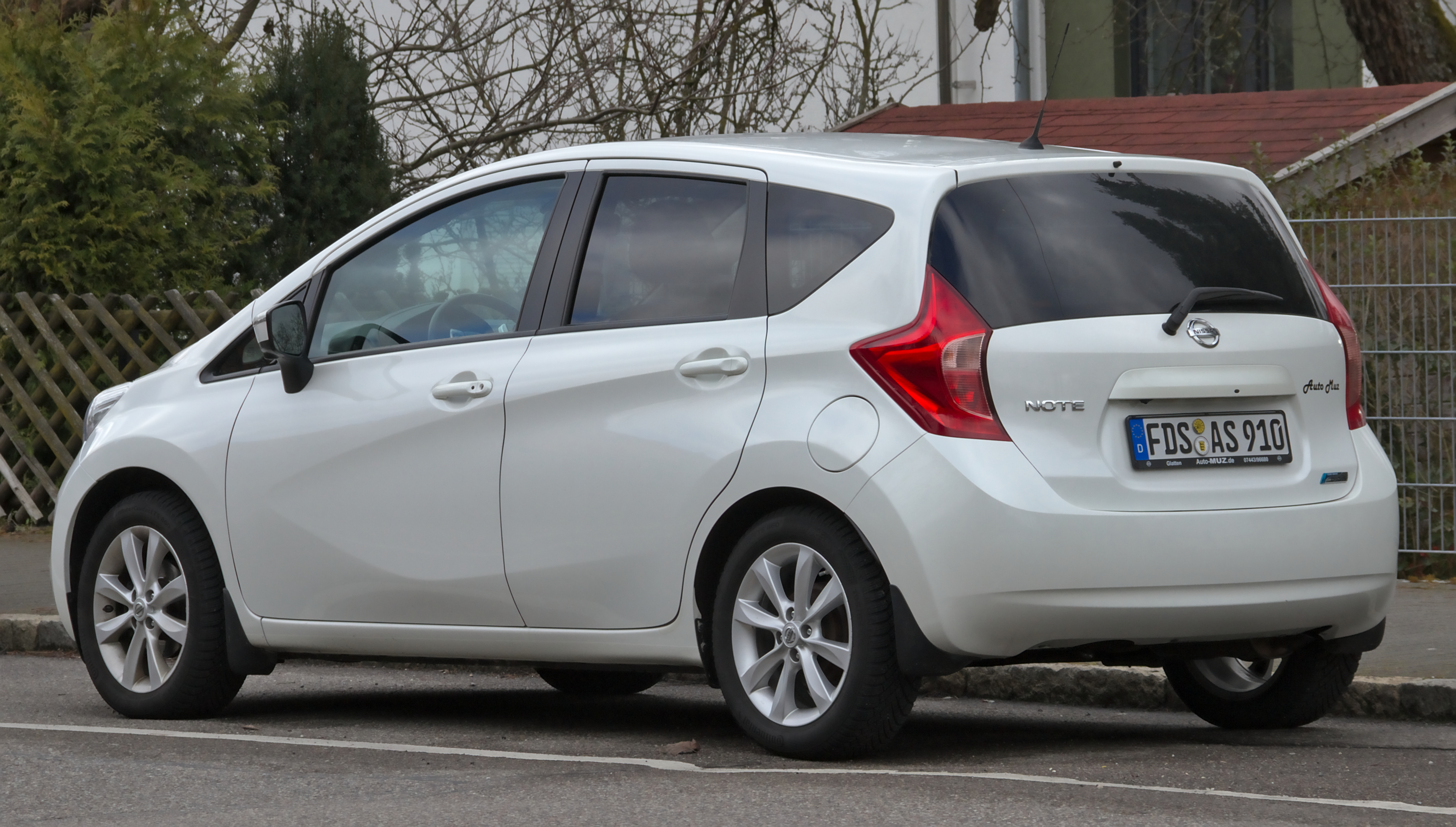
Rear view

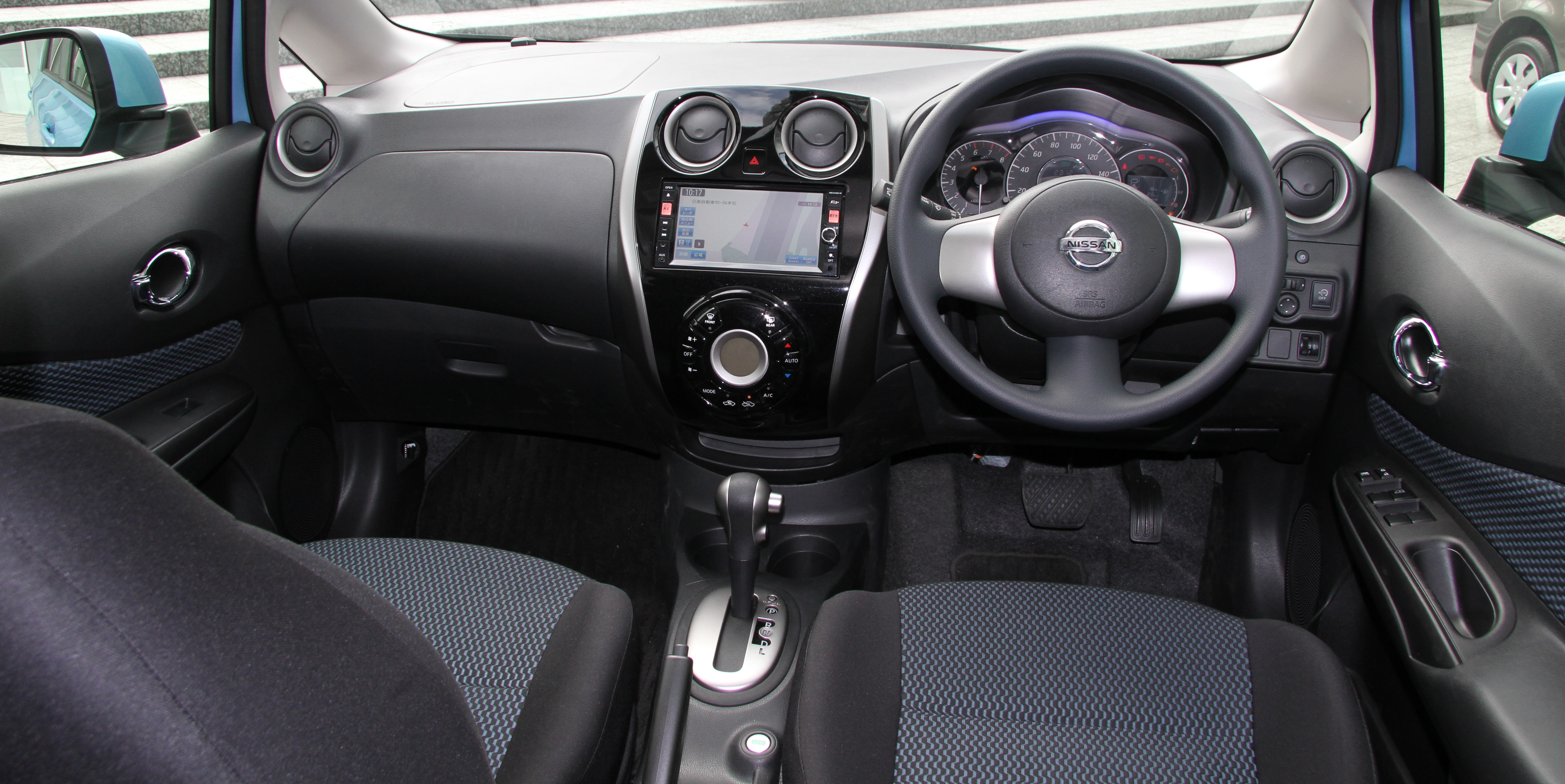
Interior

==== Note Medalist ====
The Medalist is an unmarked version of the Note for the Japanese market, with plated door handles, exclusive Beatnic Gold body colour, suede-like cloth seats and artificial leather, piano-like centre cluster finisher, and genuine leather-wrapped steering wheel. The highest grade "MEDALIST" is also a model that inherits the concept of Tidus and comes from the Laurel's grade of the same name.

==== Versa Note (2013–2019) ====
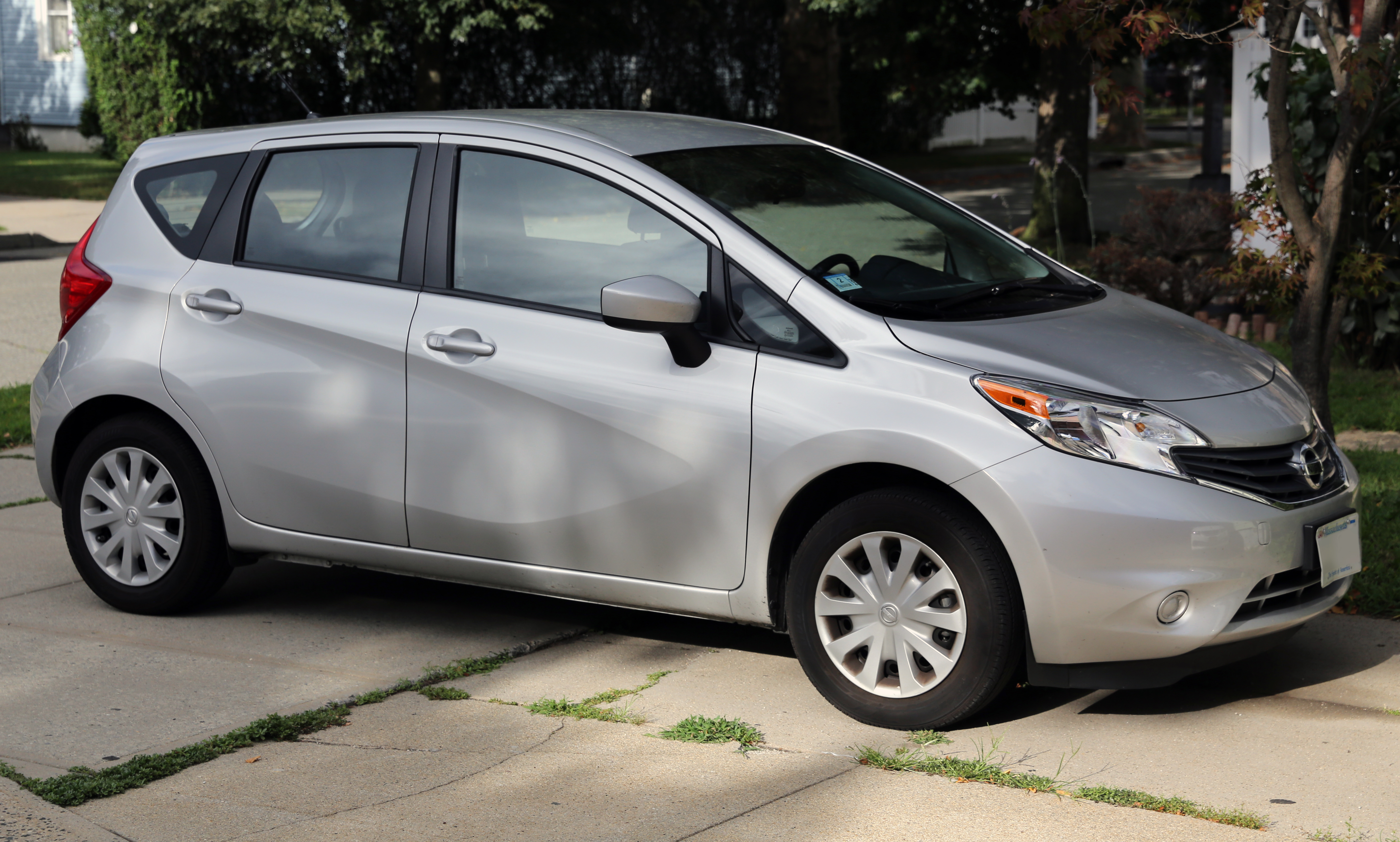
2015 Nissan Versa Note SV (US)

The Versa Note is a version of the Note for the US market, as a replacement of the outgoing Versa hatchback.

The vehicle was unveiled at the 2013 North American International Auto Show.

The US model went on sale in mid-2013 as 2014 model year vehicle. Early models include 1.6-litre DOHC 4-cylinder engine with dual fuel injection and Twin CVTC (Continuously Variable Timing Control), 5-speed manual or Xtronic CVT transmission, 5 grade levels (S, S Plus, SV, SL). A sporty SR model has been added to the 2015 lineup. A 2017 facelift featured a new front bumper cover and on the rear (previously only available on the SR model), wheels, and colour choices.

Nissan discontinued the Versa Note in late 2019, while the Versa sedan continued to be offered for the 2020 model year onwards.

==== Engines ====
Engine Type	code	Power, torque@rpm
1,198 cc (1.198 L; 73.1 cu in) I3 (79PS)	HR12DE	79 PS (58 kW; 78 hp)@6000, 10.8 kg⋅m (106 N⋅m; 78 lbf⋅ft)@4400
1,198 cc (1.198 L; 73.1 cu in) I3 supercharged (98PS)	HR12DDR	98 PS (72 kW; 97 hp)@5600, 14.5 kg⋅m (142 N⋅m; 105 lbf⋅ft)@4400
1,598 cc (1.598 L; 97.5 cu in) I4 (111PS)	HR16DE	111 PS (82 kW; 109 hp)@6000, 14.8 kg⋅m (145 N⋅m; 107 lbf⋅ft)@4400

==== Production ====
The Japanese Note is manufactured at Nissan Motor Kyushu, while European models of Nissan Note were developed at Nissan Technical Centre Europe (NTCE) in both the UK and Spain and produced at Nissan Manufacturing UK in Sunderland.

Both the North American Nissan Versa Note and Latin American models of the Nissan Note are built in Nissan Mexicana SA de CV in Aguascalientes, Mexico.

As of 19 September 2012, Japanese dealers received 21,880 market orders of the Note.

==== Marketing ====
As part of the Note's market launch in Japan, the Note's Japan website featured a flip book animation.

==== DRLs ====
Nissan Note uses PS19W DRLs in Argentine and European models.

=== Yearly Changes ===
==== 2013 updates ====
The Note underwent its first minor change in December 2013. Changes include HR12DDR and HR12DE engines include CO_{2} emission reduction, addition of Emergency Brake Packages, addition of Moving object detection for Around View Monitor (optional in X, X DIG-S, X FOUR, X FOUR Aero Style, X Emergency Brake Package, X FOUR Aero Style Emergency Brake Package), super UV-blocking green glass (standard in all but S, S DIG-S), standard rear centre seat headrest.

The vehicle was unveiled at the 43rd Tokyo Motor Show in 2013. Japanese model went on sale on 25 December 2013.

==== 2014 updates ====
A minor changes occurred again in October 2014. The base S variant was discontinued.

The sporting variants called the Nismo and Nismo S was released in October 2014. The difference between the Nismo and the Nismo S is that the Nismo focused solely on improving aerodynamics, while the NISMO S features a tuned HR16DE engine and a 5-speed manual transmission.

=== Engines ===
Engine Type	code	Power, torque/rpm
1,198 cc (1.198 L; 73.1 cu in) I3	HR12DE	79 PS (58 kW; 78 hp) at 6000, 10.8 kg⋅m (106 N⋅m; 78 lb⋅ft) at 4400
1,198 cc (1.198 L; 73.1 cu in) supercharged I3	HR12DDR	98 PS (72 kW; 97 hp) at 5600, 14.5 kg⋅m (142 N⋅m; 105 lb⋅ft) at 4400

On 24 October 2016, Renault-Nissan CEO Carlos Ghosn revealed the facelifted 2017 model year Note at the Nissan Note factory in Japan, now available with a special powertrain called e-Power. It uses only an electric motor to move the car, while a petrol engine is used as a generator producing electricity that goes directly into propelling the electric motor or, when electricity is in excess, to charge the batteries (similar to BMW's REX).

==== 2016 facelift ====
Nissan unveiled a hybrid powertrain for the new Note e-Power on 2 November 2016 in Japan.

The company's new e-Power series hybrid system consists of a small 1.2-litre, three-cylinder petrol engine (HR12DE), and an electric traction motor (EM57), which is shared with the Leaf, and pairs with a much smaller battery (1.5 kWh) than the Leaf's. Unlike typical power-split parallel hybrid vehicles, in the series hybrid scheme, the small engine only charges the battery, and the electric motor is the sole source of traction with no plug-in capability. The motor power output rating is 80 kW (110 PS; 110 hp) and 240 newton-metres (24 kg⋅m; 180 lb⋅ft) torque.

As of 2017, the Note is being sold only in Asia and the Americas. UK production for European and Argentine markets ended in March that year to increase capacity for the Qashqai.

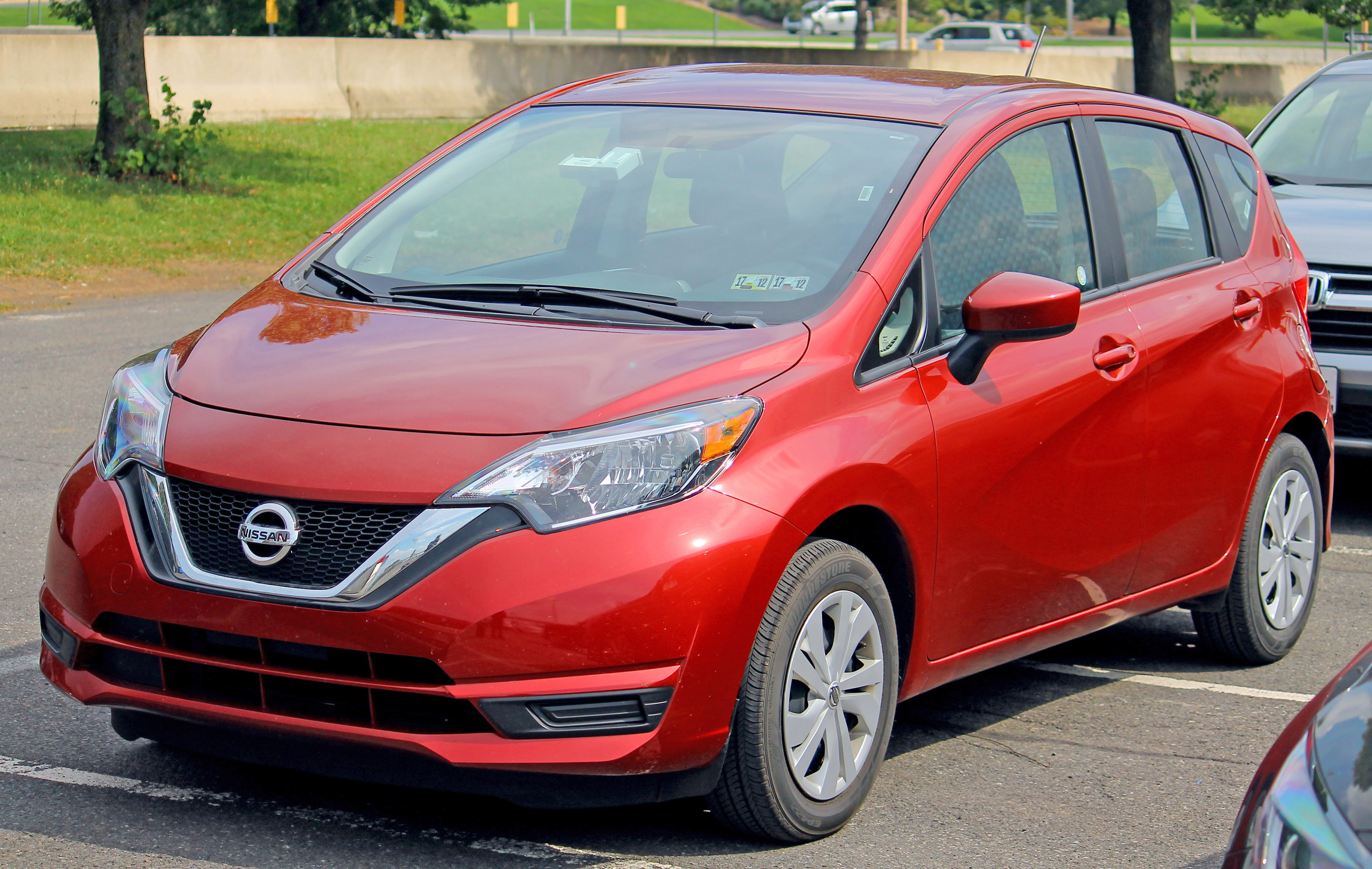
2017 Nissan Versa Note (US)

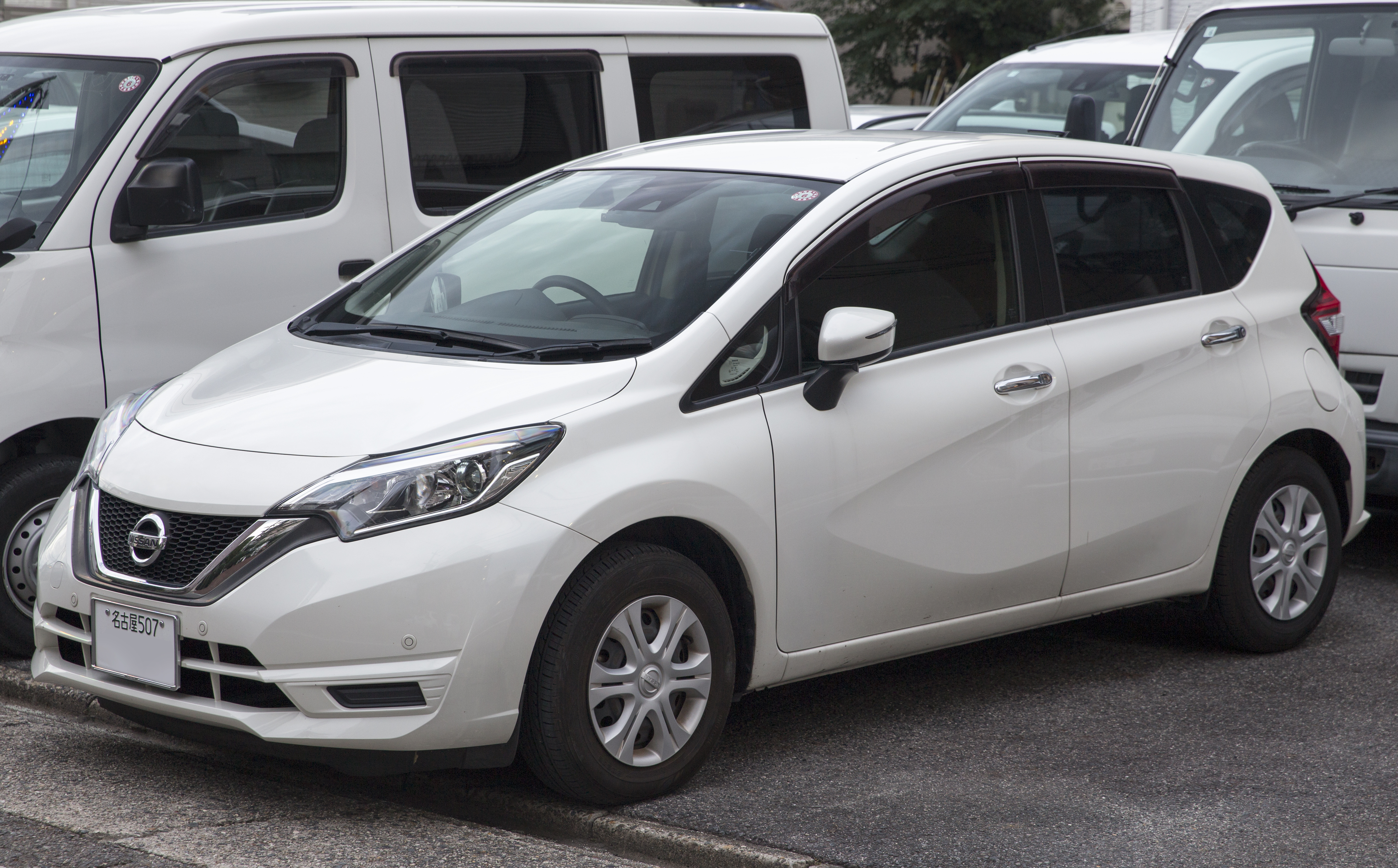
Nissan Note X (non-hybrid model; Japan)

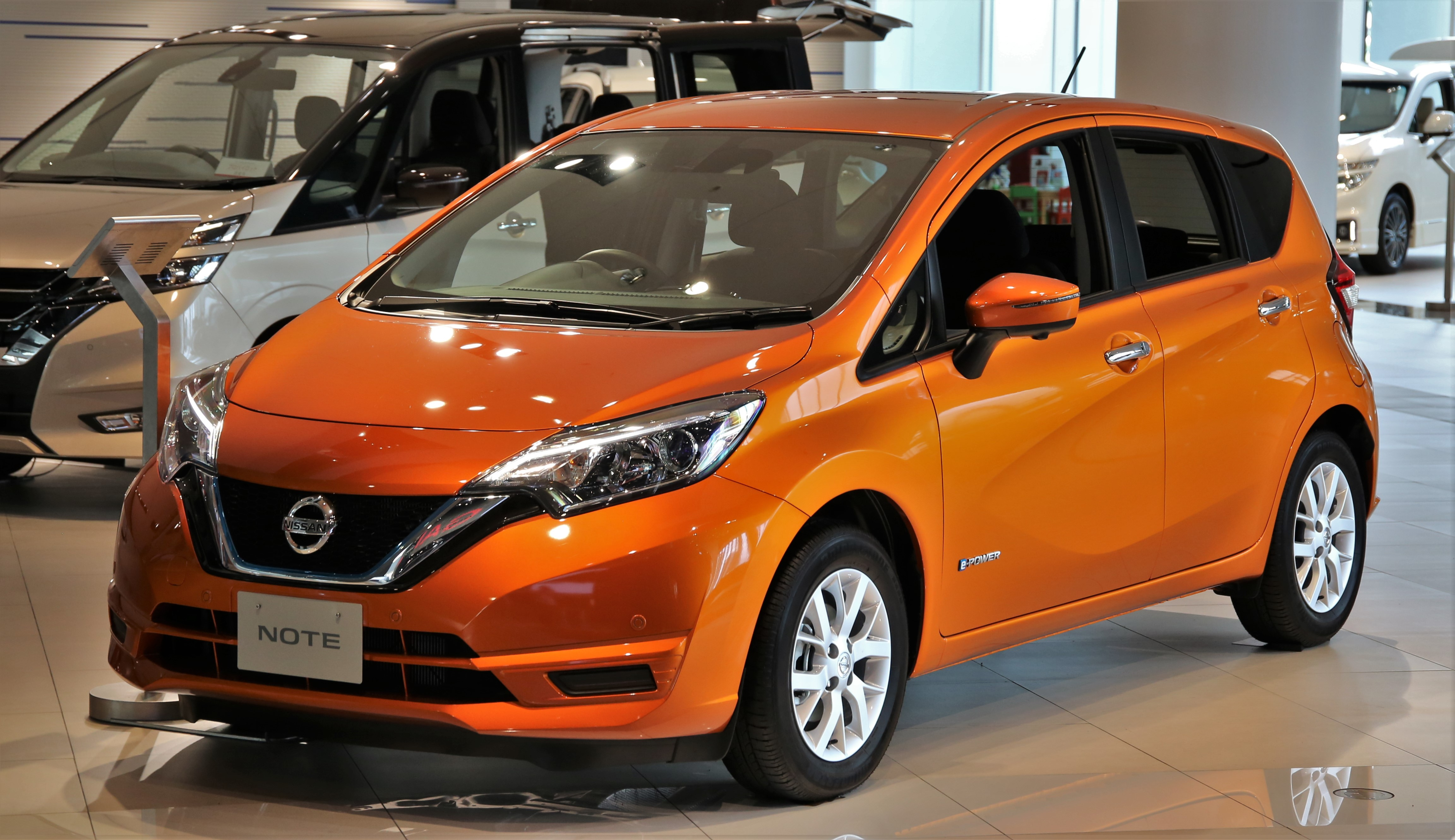
Nissan Note e-Power X (Japan)

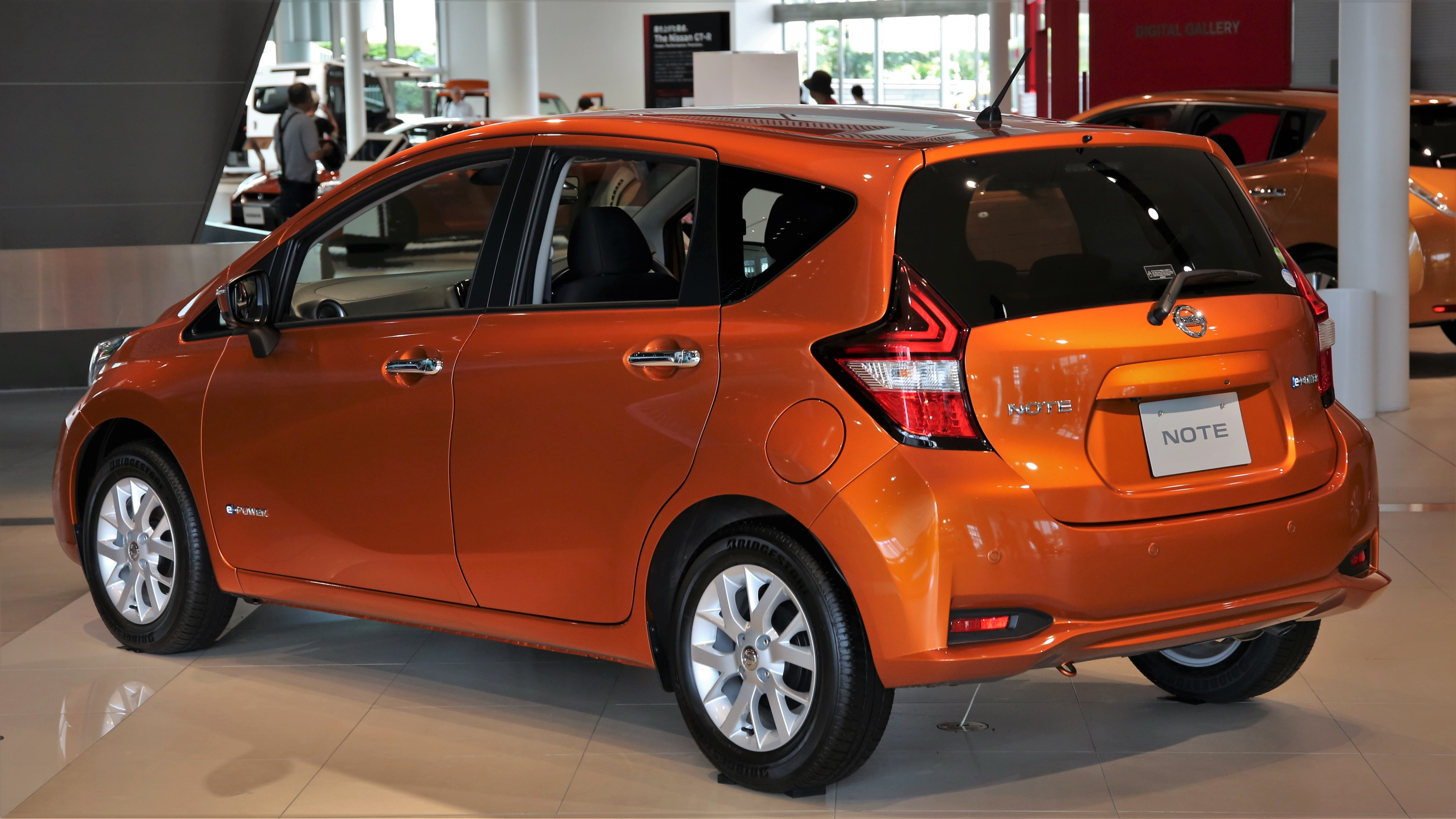
Nissan Note e-Power X (Japan)

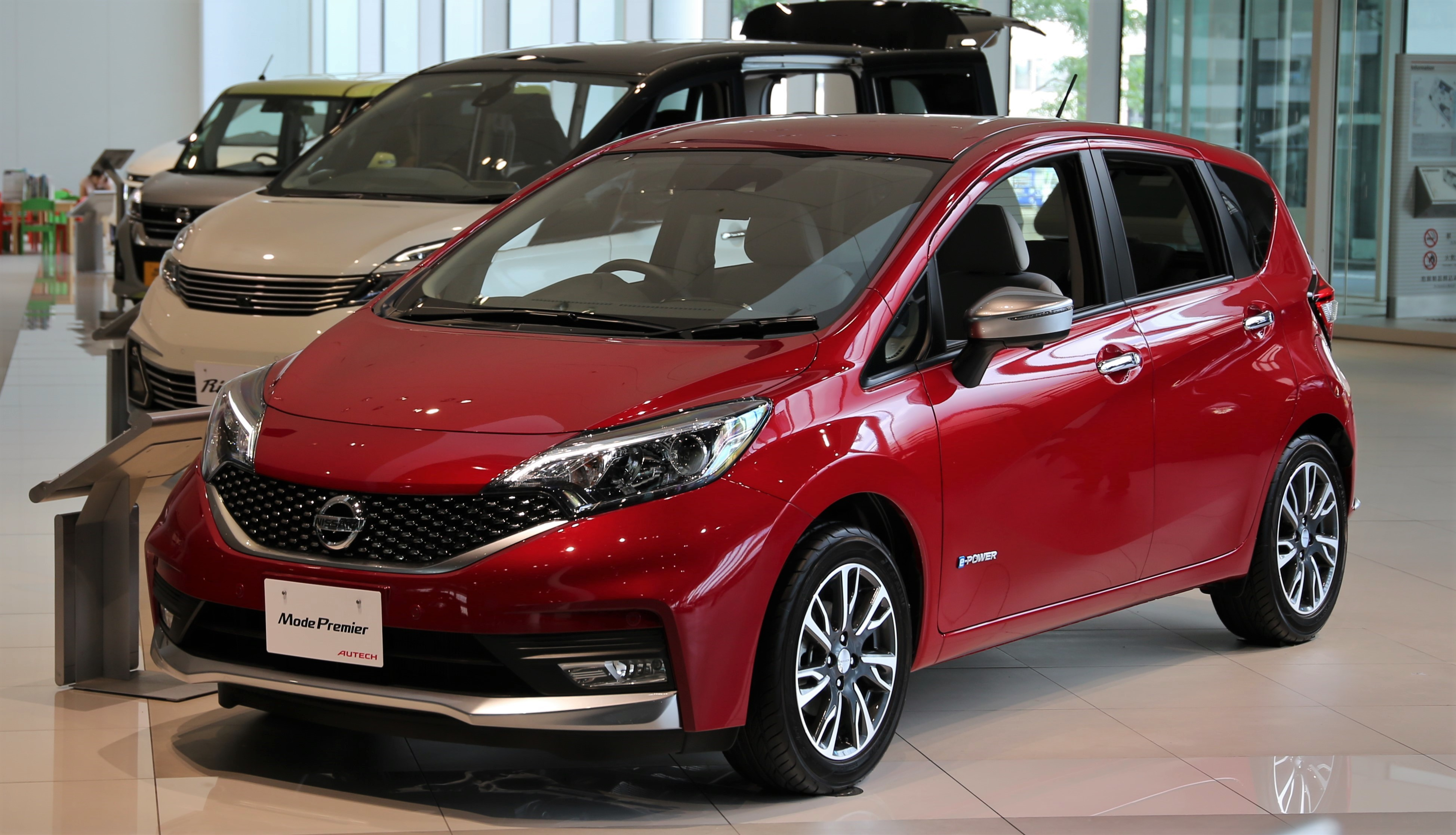
Nissan Note e-Power Mode Premier (Japan)

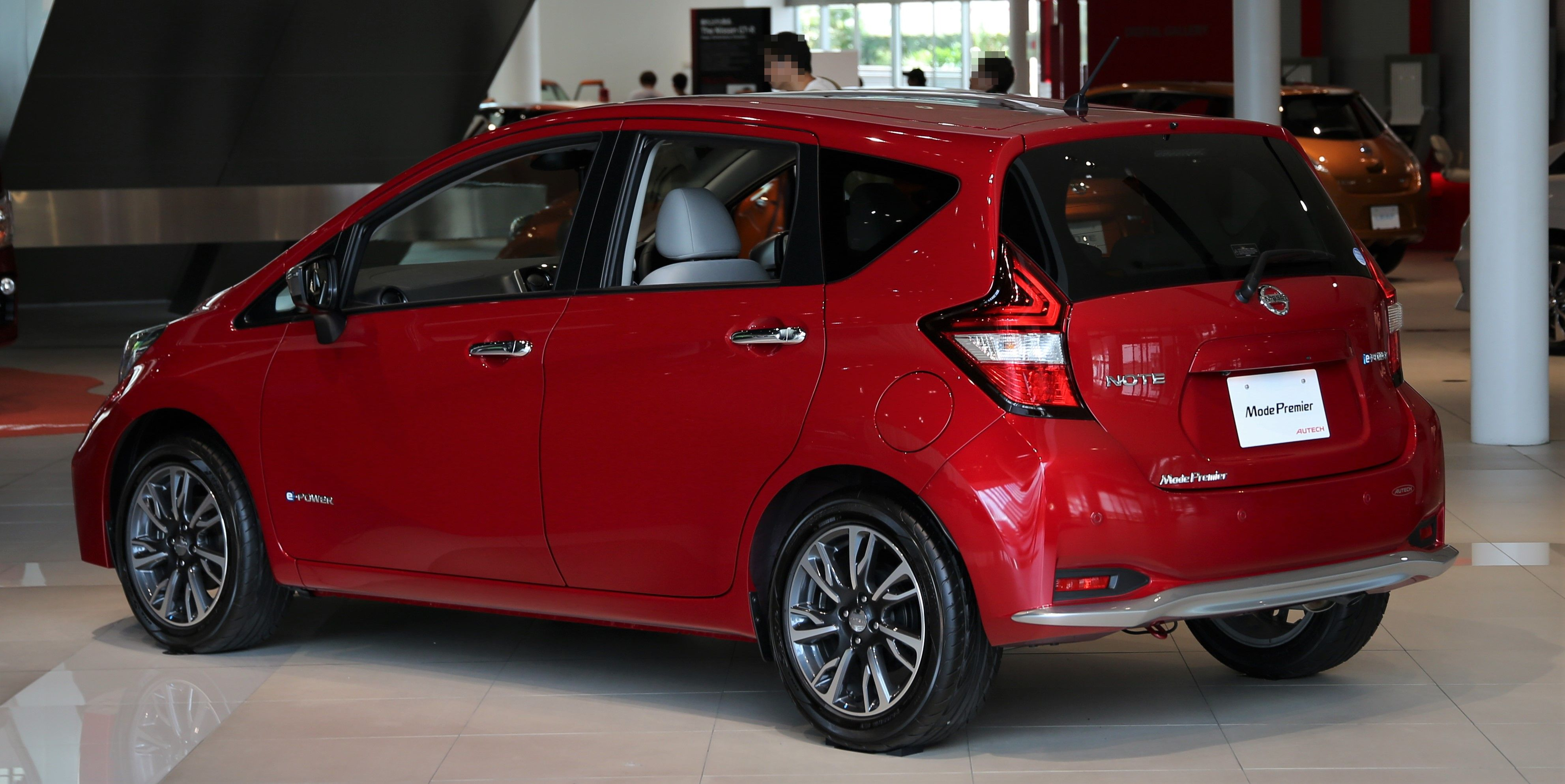
Nissan Note e-Power Mode Premier (Japan)

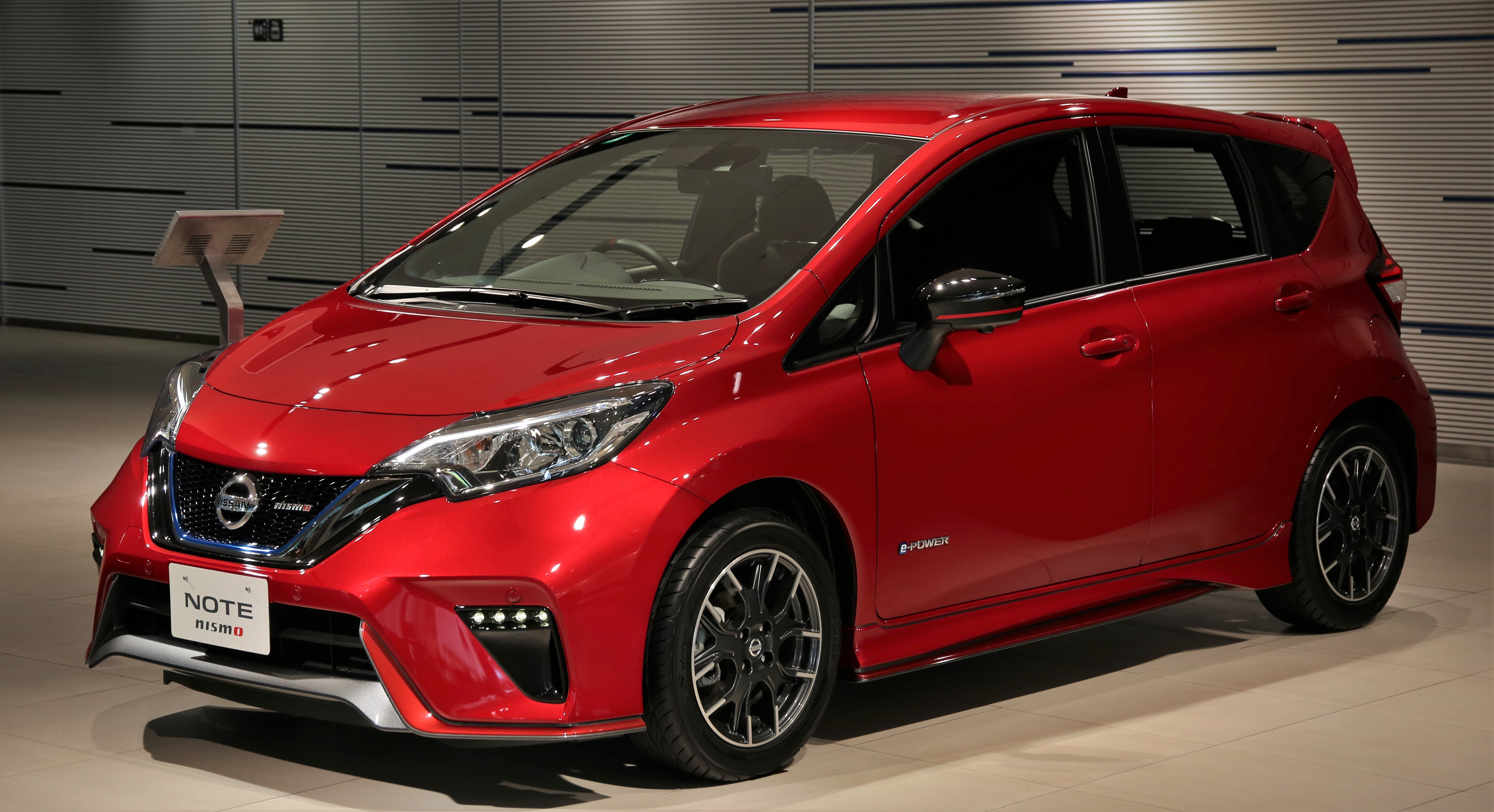
Nissan Note e-Power Nismo (Japan)

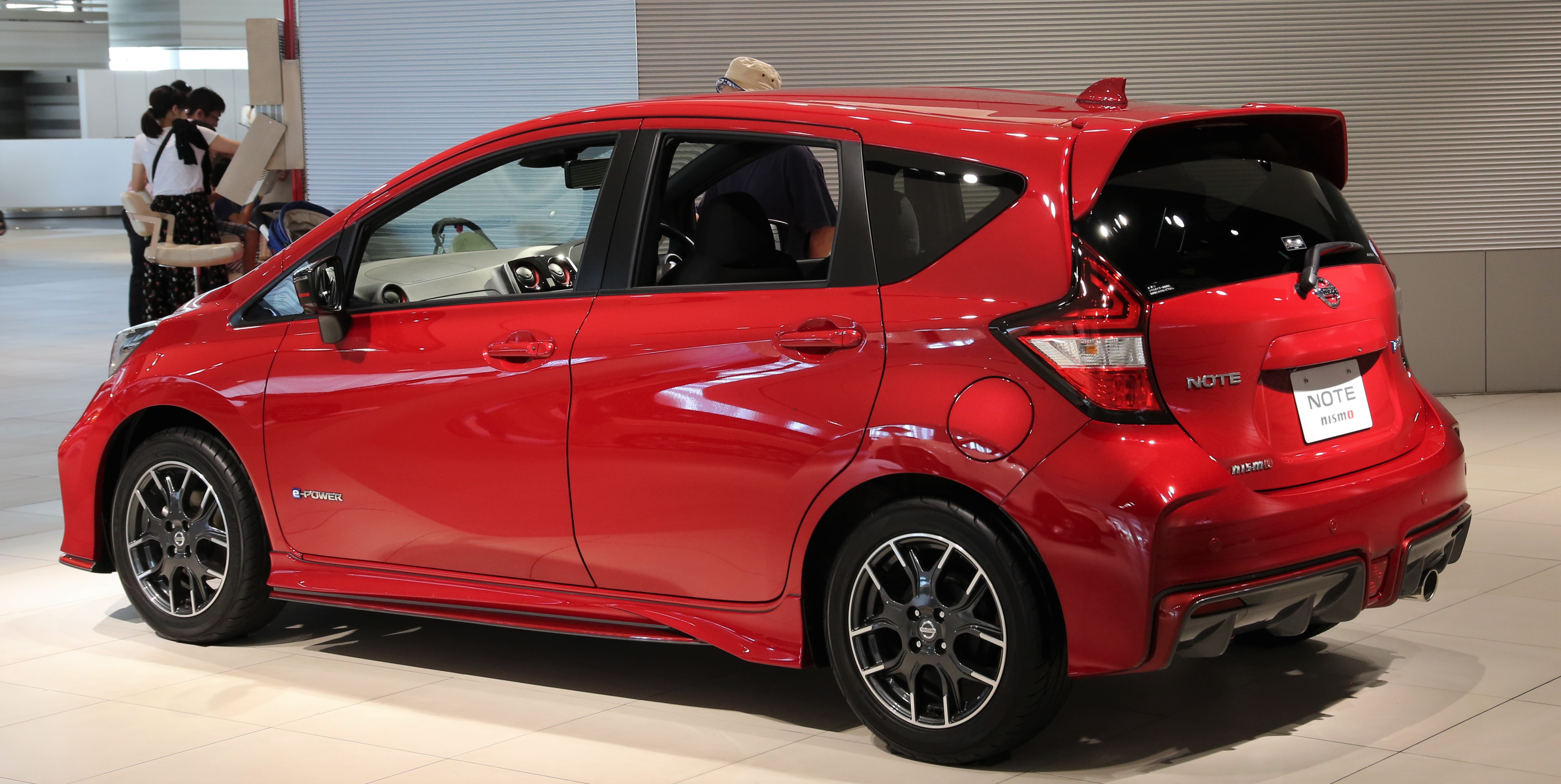
Nissan Note e-Power Nismo (Japan)

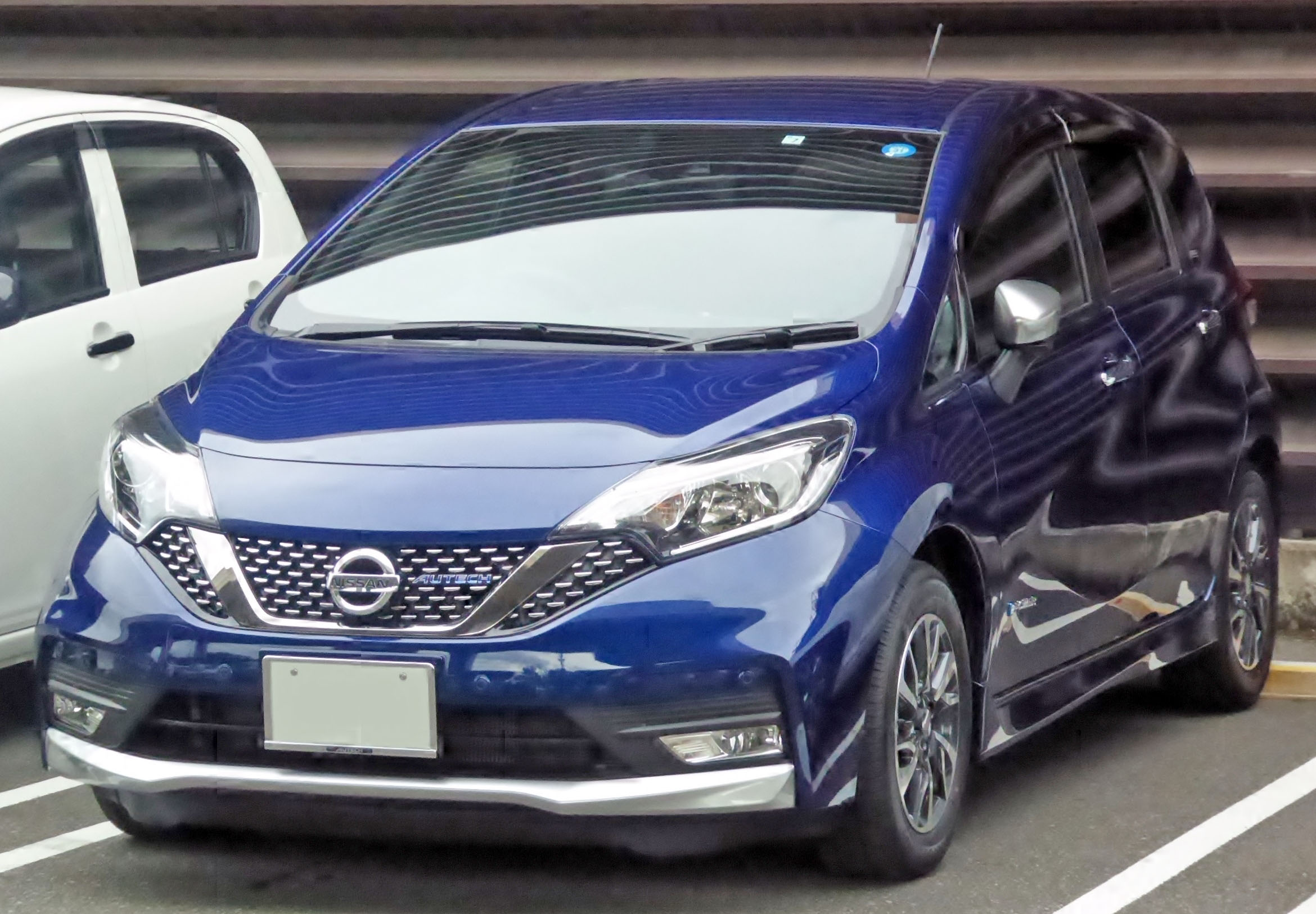
Nissan Note e-Power Autech (Japan)

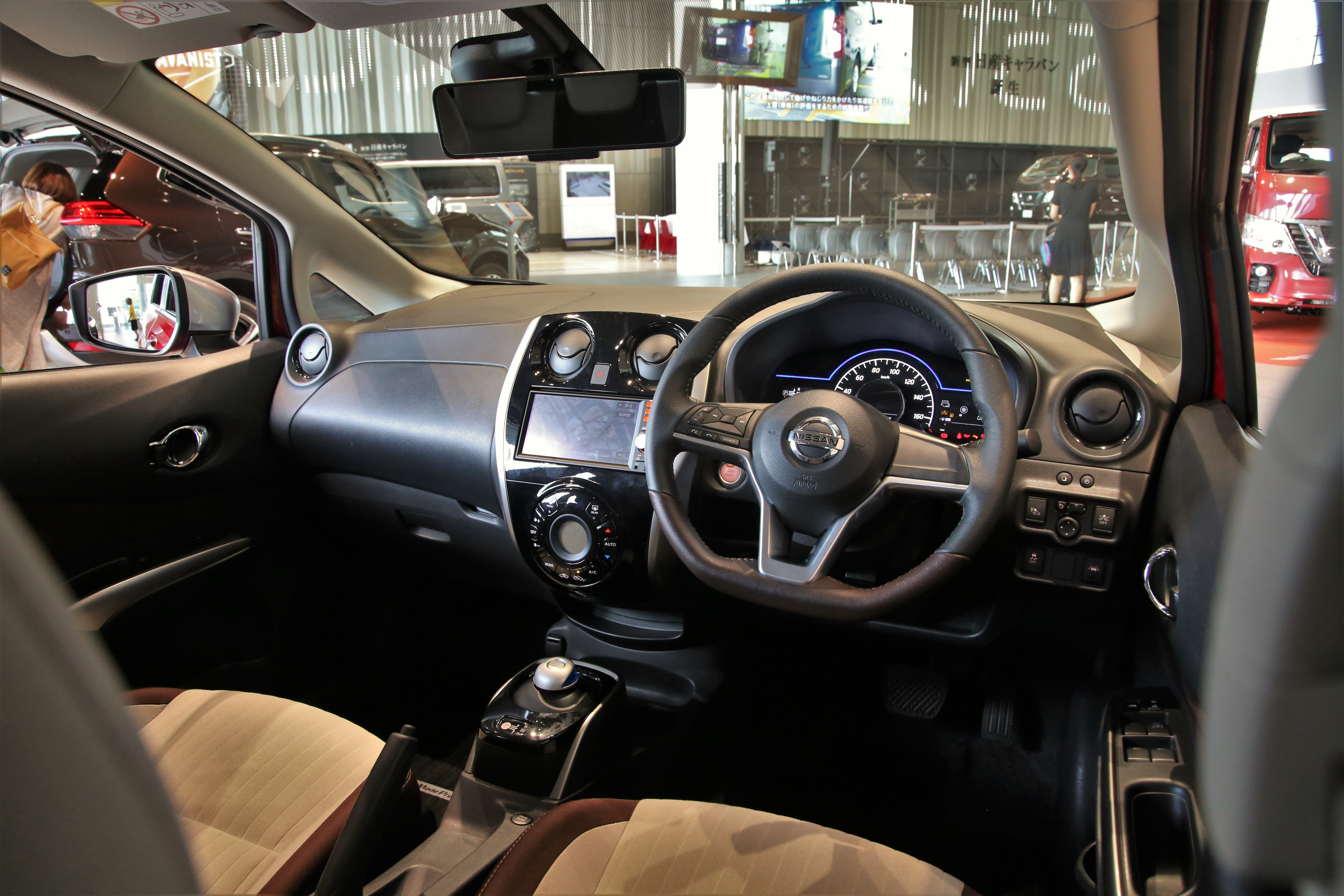
Nissan Note e-Power Mode Premier interior (Japan)

== Third generation (E13; 2020) ==
Third generation
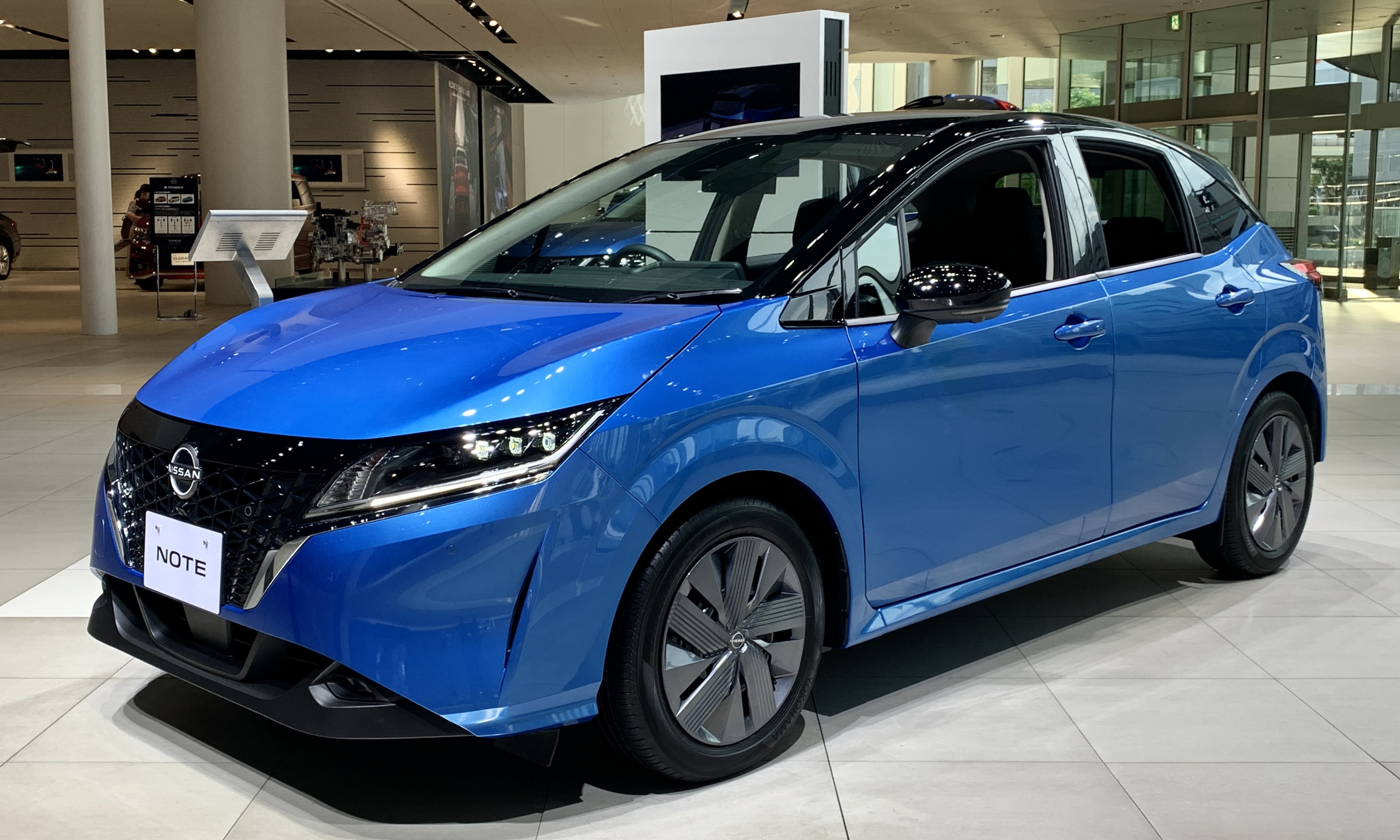

Overview
- Model code: E13
- Production: December 2020 – present
- Assembly: Japan: Yokosuka, Kanagawa (Oppama Plant)
- Designer: Giovanny Arroba; Kazunori Murabayashi (Note Aura)

Body and chassis
- Layout: Front-engine, front-motor, front-wheel-drive Front-engine, dual-motor, all-wheel-drive
- Platform: Renault–Nissan CMF-B HS platform
- Related: Nissan Juke (F16); Renault Clio V

Powertrain
- Engine: Petrol: 1.2 L HR12DE e-Power hybrid I3 (generator only); 1.5 L KR15DDT e-Power hybrid turbo I3 (Note Aura Nismo RS, generator only)
- Electric motor: EM47 85–100 kW (114–134 hp; 116–136 PS), 280–300 N⋅m (210–220 lb⋅ft) AC3 synchronous MM48 50 kW (67 hp; 68 PS), 100 N⋅m (74 lb⋅ft) AC3 synchronous
- Transmission: Single speed constant ratio
- Hybrid drivetrain: Series hybrid

Dimensions
- Wheelbase: 2,580 mm (101.6 in)
- Length: 4,045 mm (159.3 in)
- Width: 1,695 mm (66.7 in); 1,735 mm (68.3 in) (Note Aura)
- Height: 1,505–1,520 mm (59.3–59.8 in)
- Curb weight: 1,190–1,220 kg (2,620–2,690 lb)

The third-generation Note was revealed in Japan on 24 November 2020 and went on sale on 23 December 2020. It is based on the CMF-B platform. For this generation, the Note is only available with an e-Power series hybrid 2WD or 4WD drivetrain (introduced later in 2021), in which one electric motor powering the front axle and another motor powering the rear axle.

The E13 Note retains strut front, and torsion beam rear suspension. The car is 55 mm shorter in total length than the outgoing model, with turning radius reduced to 4.9 m. Body stiffness was increased 30% with the use of 1470 Mpa ultra-high tensile steel. The 2WD Note uses a 1.54 kW lithium-ion battery mounted under the front seats. The drivetrain was upgraded to the second generation e-Power unit, with torque increasing to 280 Nm for 2WD models. The new inverter is 40% smaller and 30% lighter than the outgoing e-Power Note.

Japanese models went on sale in December 2020. Initial models included the e-Power, followed by the e-Power AWD in 2021.

The E13 Note won Car of the Year Japan for 2021-2022.

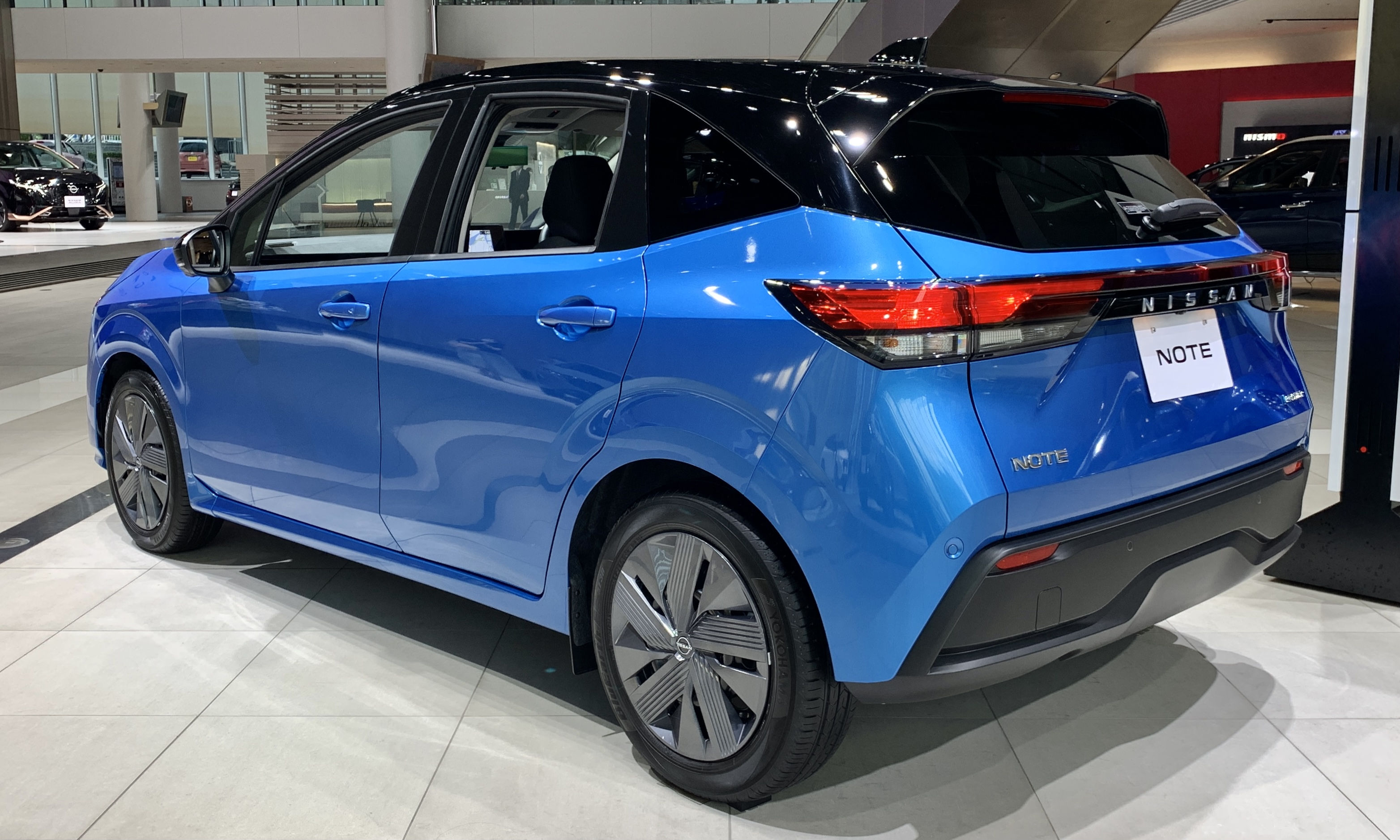
Rear view (pre-facelift)

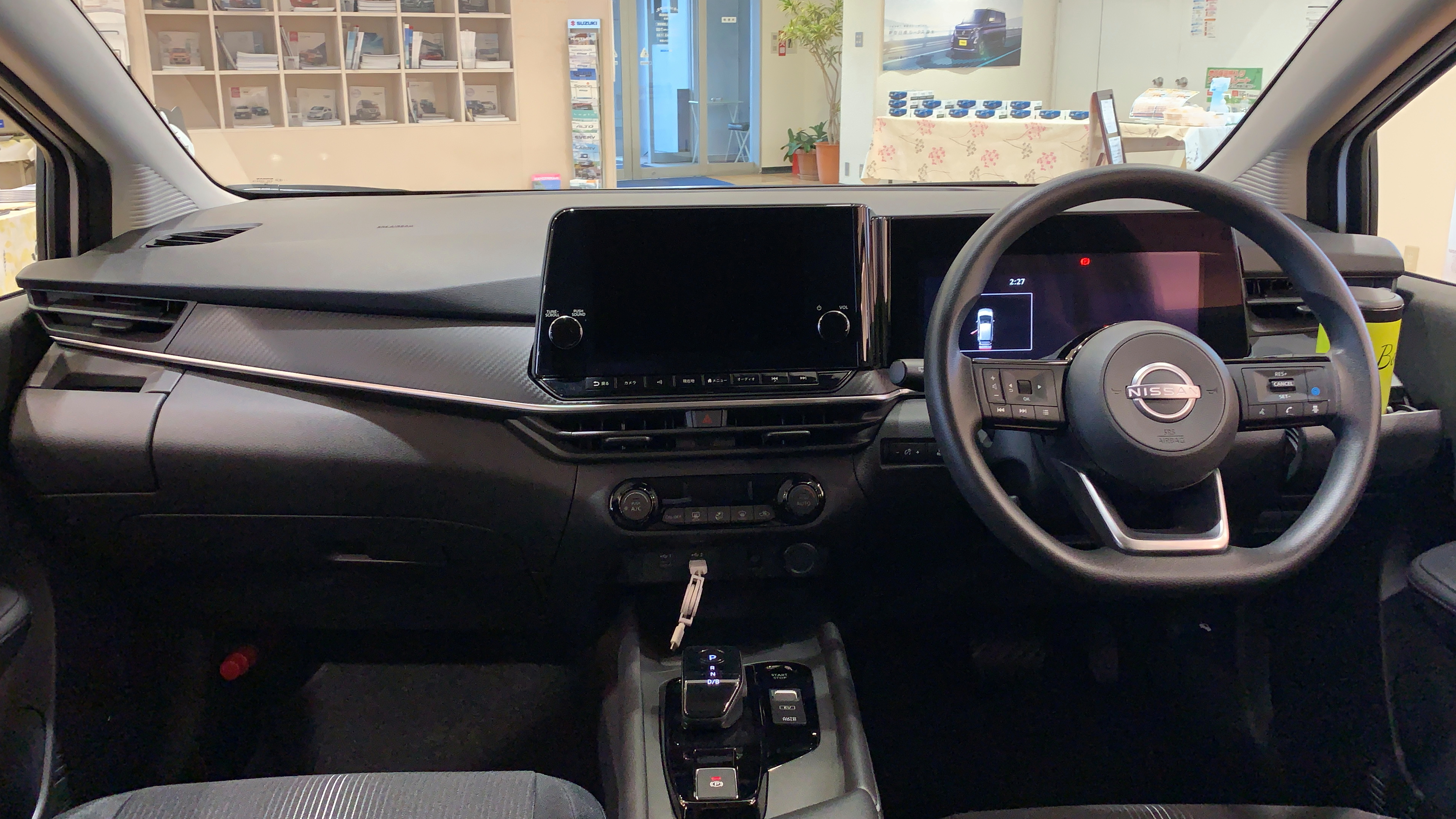
Interior

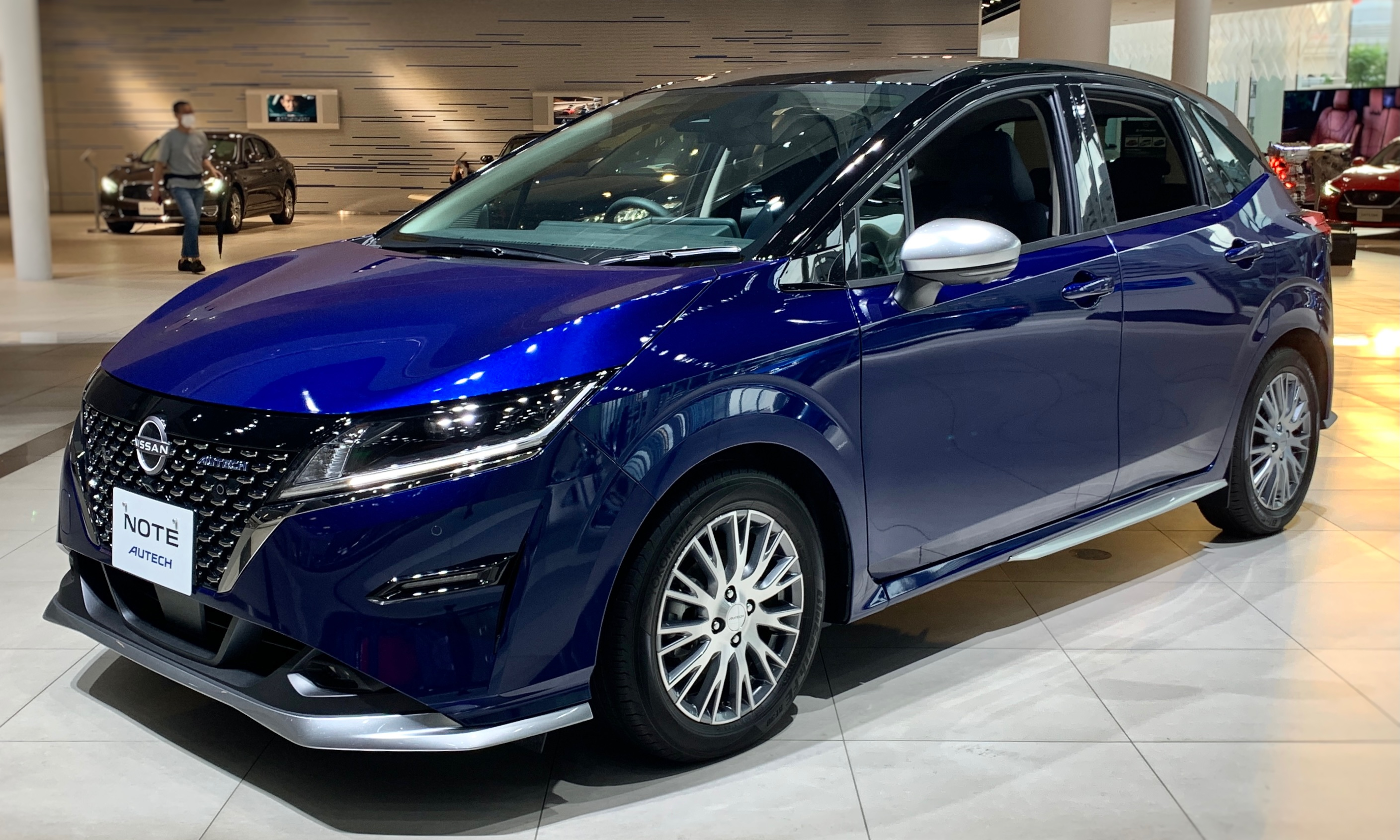
Note Autech

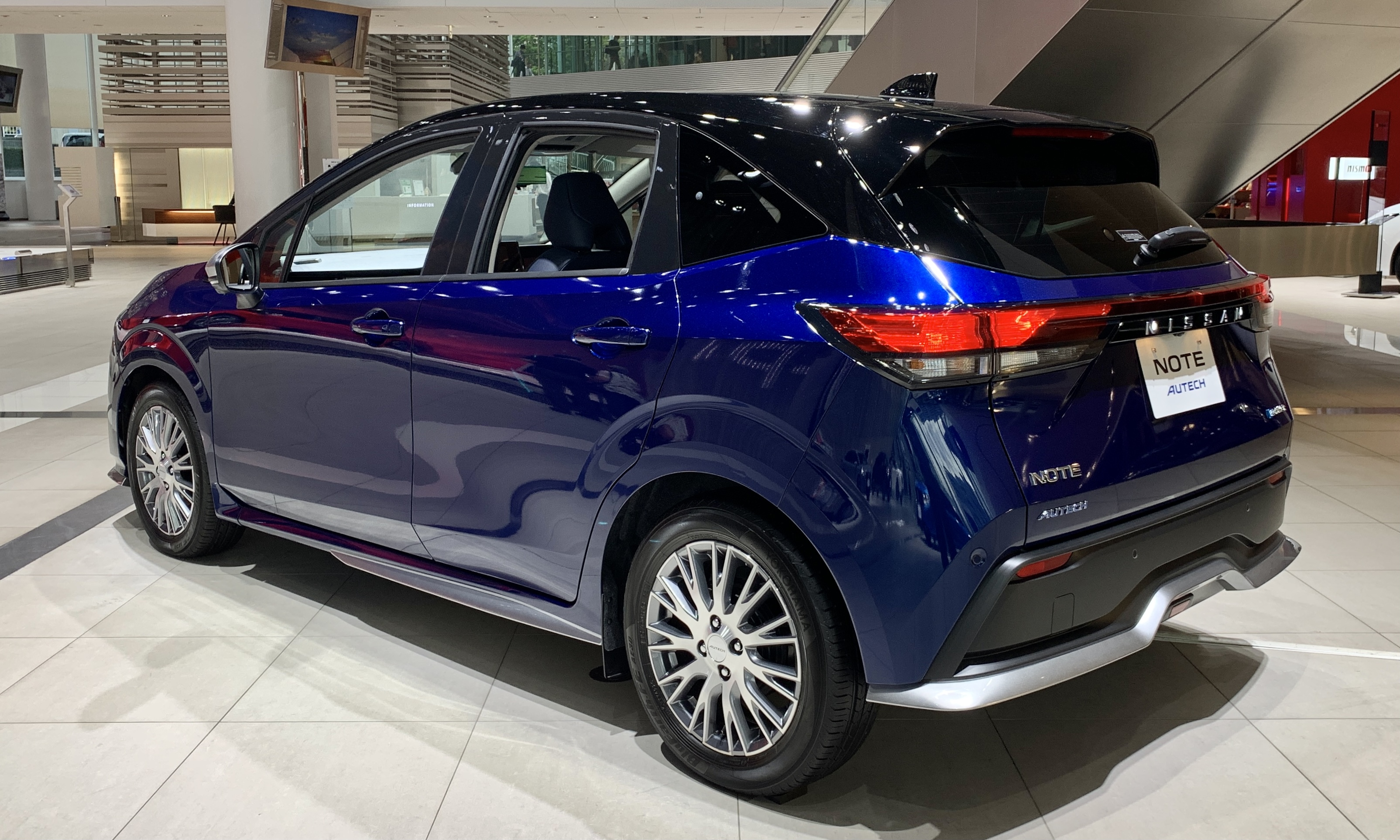
Rear view (Autech)

=== Trim Levels (Japan) ===
In Japan, trim levels for the Note included the F, S, X and Autech.

==== S Grade ====
Standard on the S Grade includes reverse camera with digital rear view mirror, rear wiper, 15" steel wheels and roof spoiler. The basic safety package includes airbags, ABS, hill start assist, and emergency braking. ProPILOT was not offered in S grade.

==== F Grade ====
The base F grade can be distinguished from the S grade by the lack of rear wiper and no height adjustment on the drivers seat. LED headlights, ProPILOT, blindspot warning, heated seats were not offered as an option for F grades.

==== X Grade ====
Over and above the S features, the X Grade adds keyless entry (option on the S), gradient tricot cloth seats, reclining backrest on the rear seats, shark-fin antenna, 16" steel wheels and chrome-finish door handles (interior).

==== Autech ====
The Autech is the top trim. Included are Autech special 16" wheels, side sill finisher (metal look) and front grille (dark chrome). The interior gains leather steering wheel. Seats have a blue/black combination leatherette with "AUTECH" embroidery and blue stitching. The infotainment unit, ProPILOT and blindspot monitoring are optional.

==== Options ====
Audio and infotainment were not standard on any grades. However X models were pre-wired for additional features (e.g. GPS antenna, steering wheel switches). Infotainment available as an option on the X grade and autech included a 9" display infotainment with bluetooth, apple carplay, android auto, navigation, etc.

ProPILOT was an optional driver assistance package on the X grade and Autech. Cruise control was only offered as part of the ProPILOT package, which includes lane keep assist, navigation and SOS button. ProPILOT uses the navigation system (Navi-Link) to anticipate corners and can reduce speed below the detected speed limit. Version 1.5 ProPILOT on the Note is not hands free.

Other factory options available on some grades were LED headlights, leather steering wheel, leather seats, heated seats, alloy wheels, wireless phone charging and blind spot monitoring. A raised floor module for the trunk and rear parcel shelf was an optional extra. A spare wheel was not an option (tyre repair kit standard).

=== Facelift (2024) ===
The facelifted Note was revealed on 11 December 2023. The standard Note gains a revised V-Motion grille in body colour or dark metallic grey, LED headlights as standard, and 16-inch wheels with Japanese geometric patterns. It was only offered in sole X grade, while the F and S grades was discontinued.

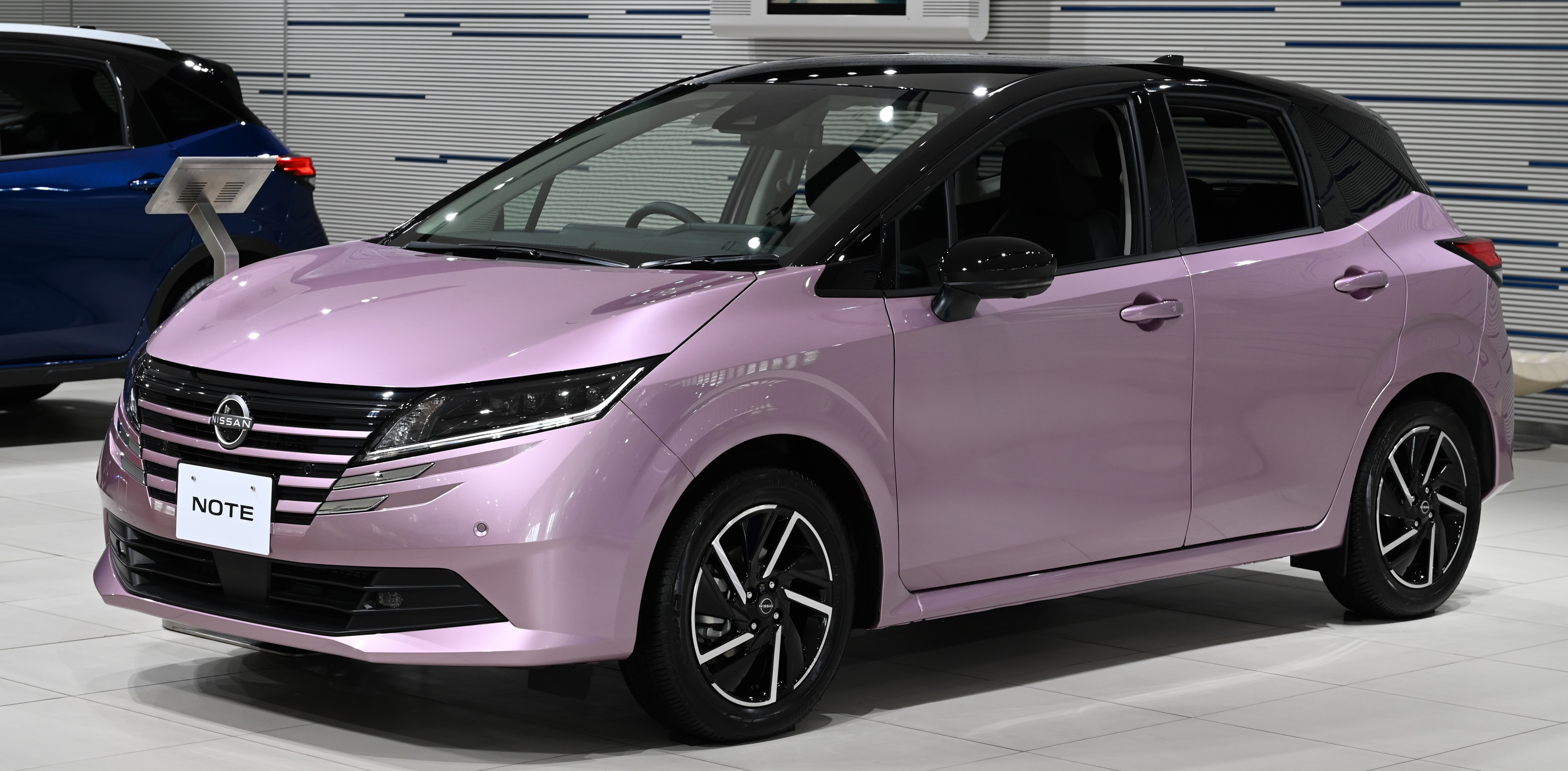
2024 Note X Four (facelift)

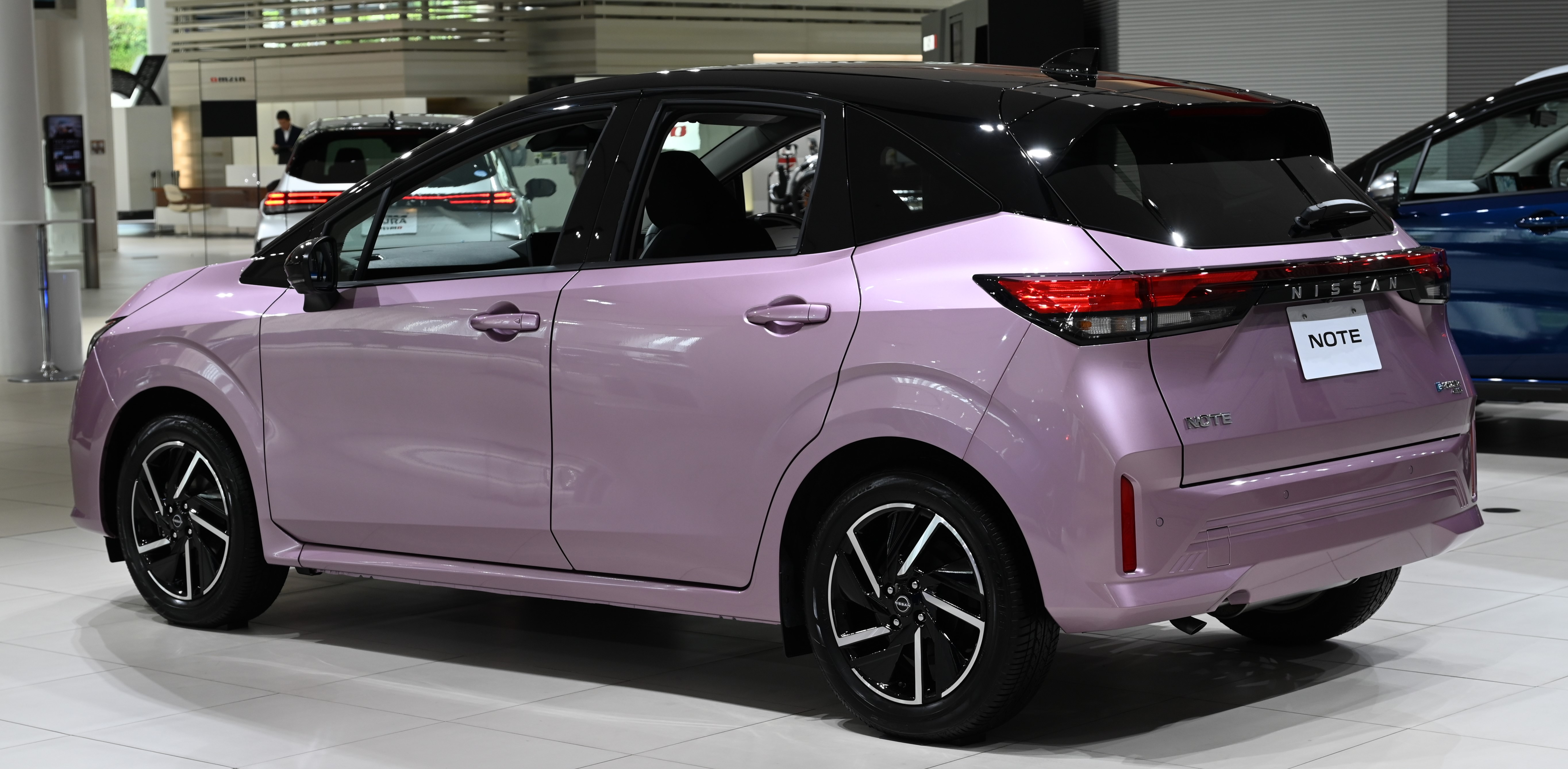
Rear view (facelift)

=== Singapore ===
The Note was launched in Singapore on 4 March 2021, in e-Power guise. It was available in two variants, Lite and Premium, with the Lite featuring fabric upholstery, while the Premium features black nappa leather.

Both variants come with 16-inch wheels, with the Lite having a steel wheels with hubcaps, and the Premium featuring alloy wheels.

It is available in a total of 11 body colour options.

The facelifted Note was launched on 22 March 2024. It is available in Premium guise and comes with a 10-year lithium-ion battery warranty and a five-year, unlimited mileage vehicle warranty.

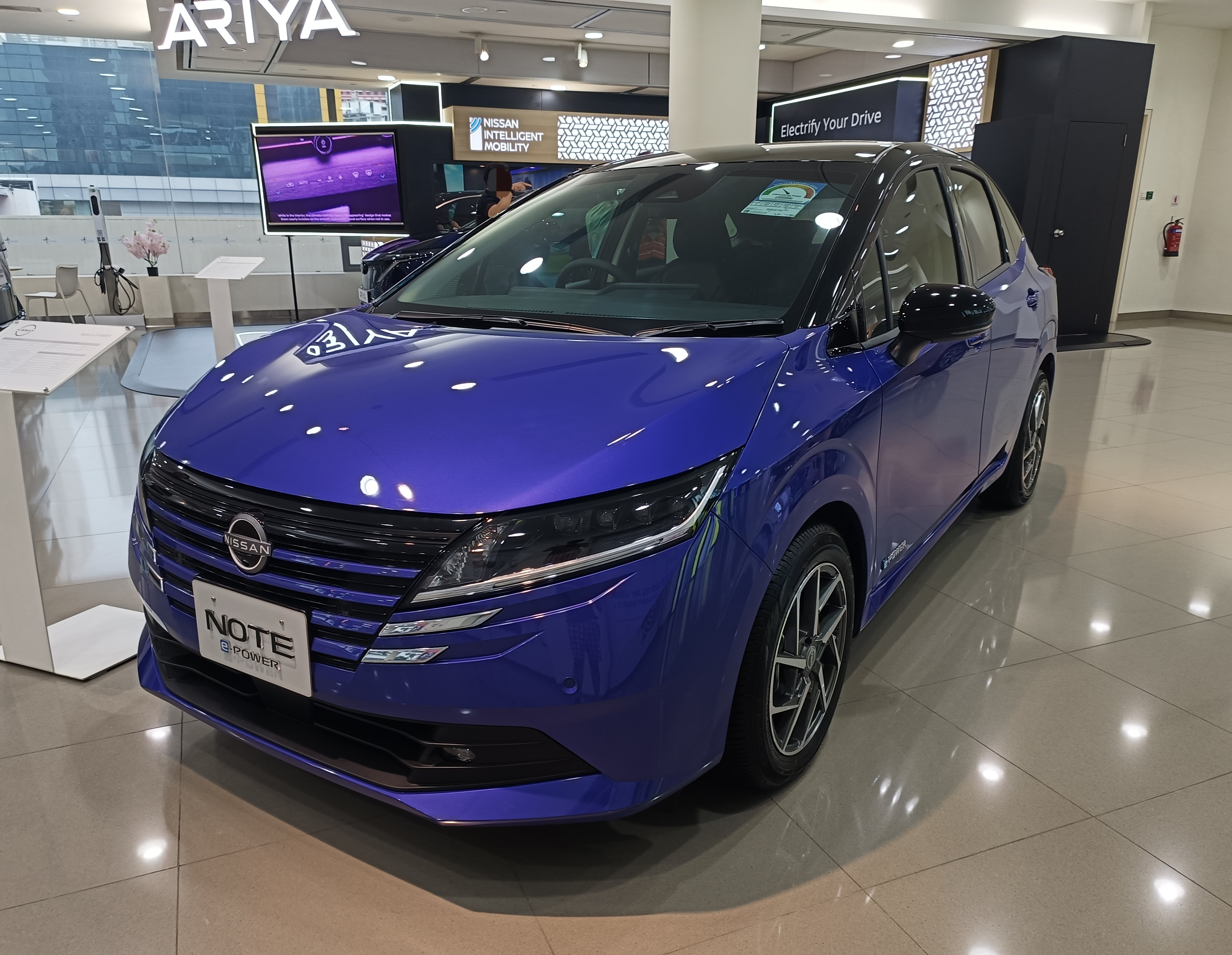
Nissan Note E Power (Singapore) (facelift)

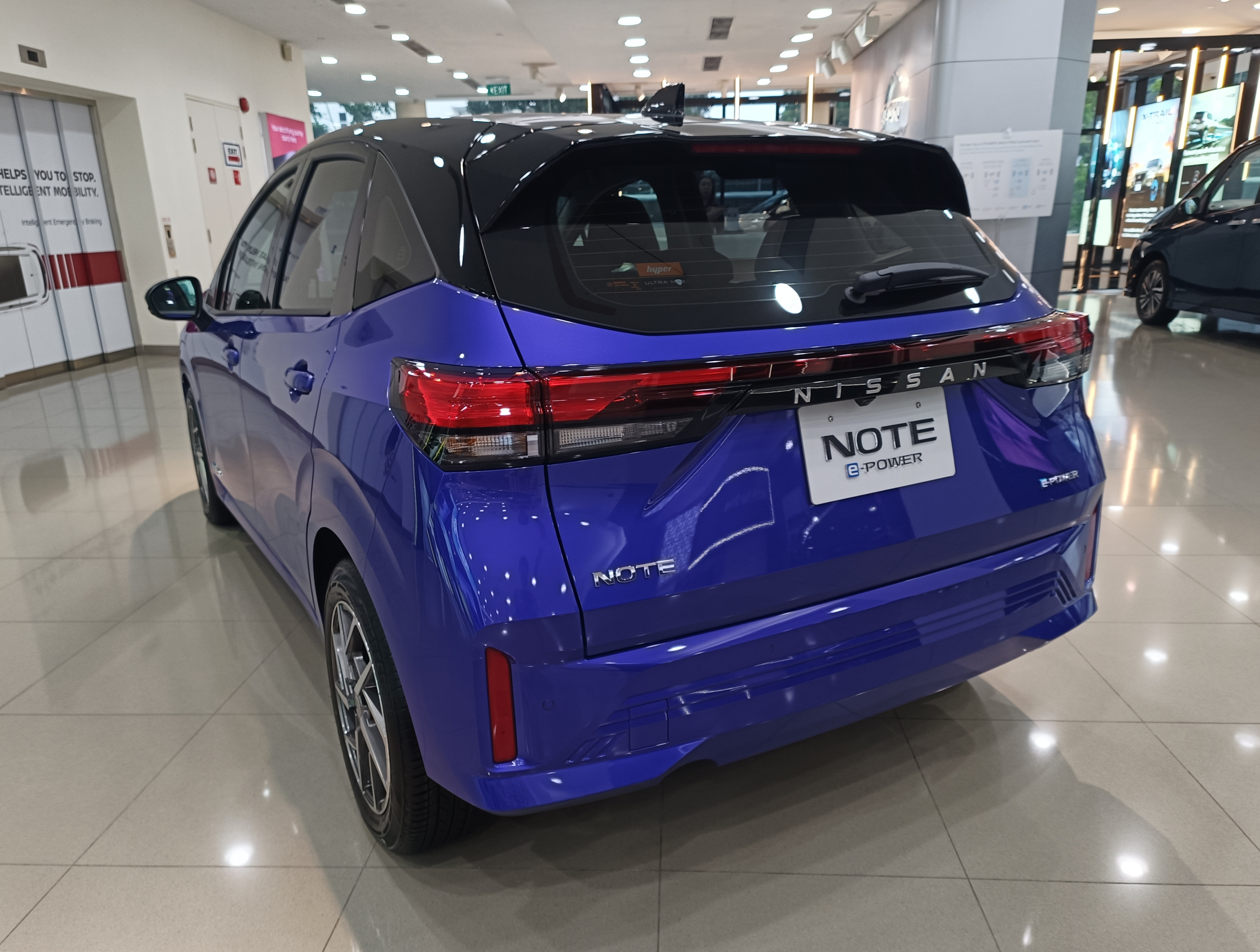
Nissan Note E Power (Singapore) (facelift)

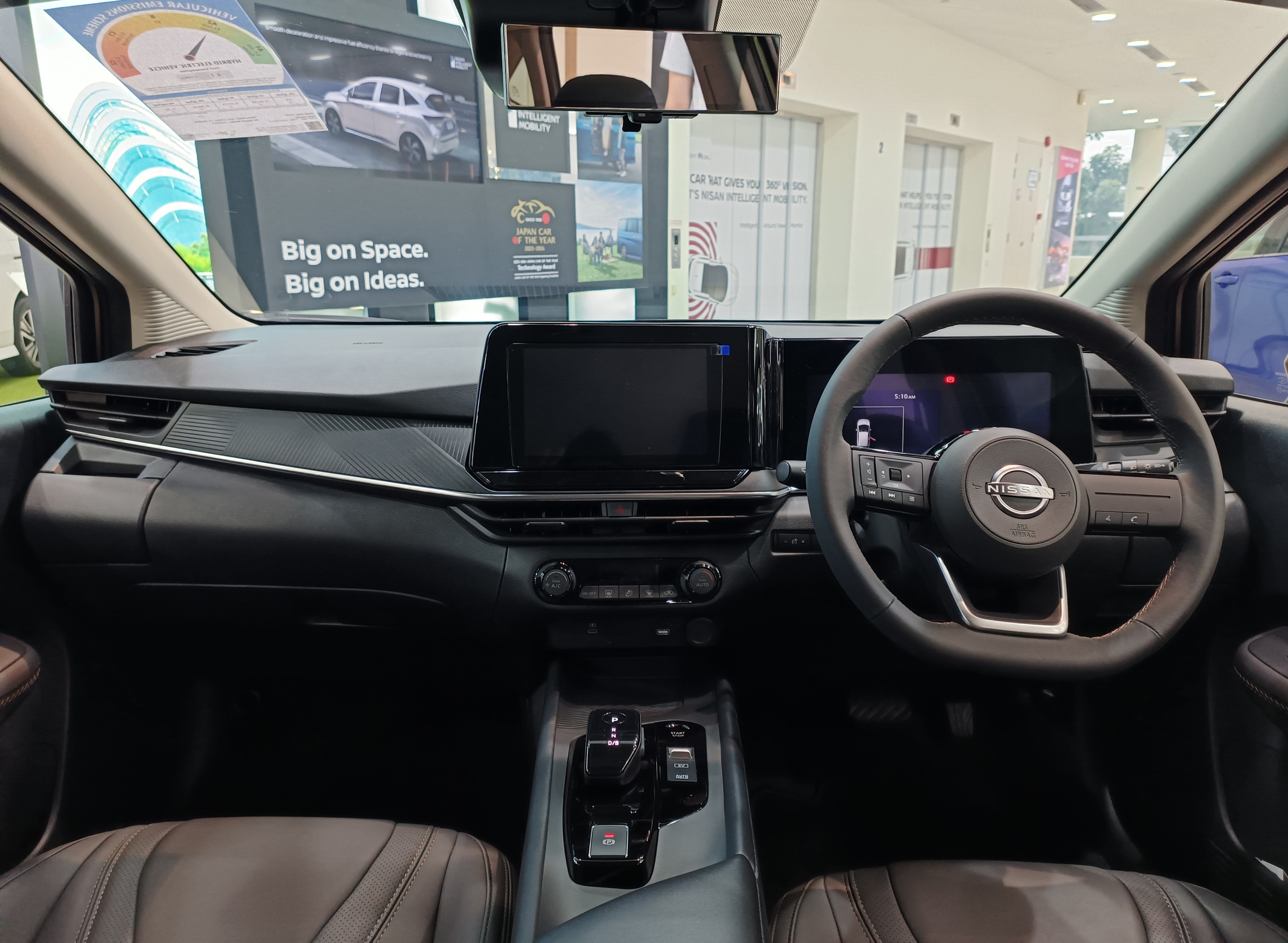
Interior (Singapore) (facelift)

=== Note Aura ===
An upmarket version called the Note Aura was introduced and went on sale in June 2021. It features a redesigned front and rear fascia, wider body, and a 100 kW (134 hp; 136 PS) and 300 N⋅m (220 lb⋅ft) torque electric motor. The 40 mm wider body was achieved by widening the wheel arches to house the 20mm wider tires. Initial models include G, G leather edition, G Four, and G Four leather edition.

The Aura NISMO was released on 17 August 2021. The exterior features a redesigned front grille, bumpers, and the 17-inch aluminium wheels. The "NISMO" exclusive emblem adopts a new design with a matte chrome and matte red painted surface treatment.

The Note Aura received a facelift on 13 June 2024 and the Nismo on 18 July 2024. The Note Aura version introduces a wider grille, sportier bumper with body-colour/chrome/copper inserts, 17-inch futuristic alloy wheels, and a sculpted rear fascia. The Autech model was added in June 2024.

Pre-facelift

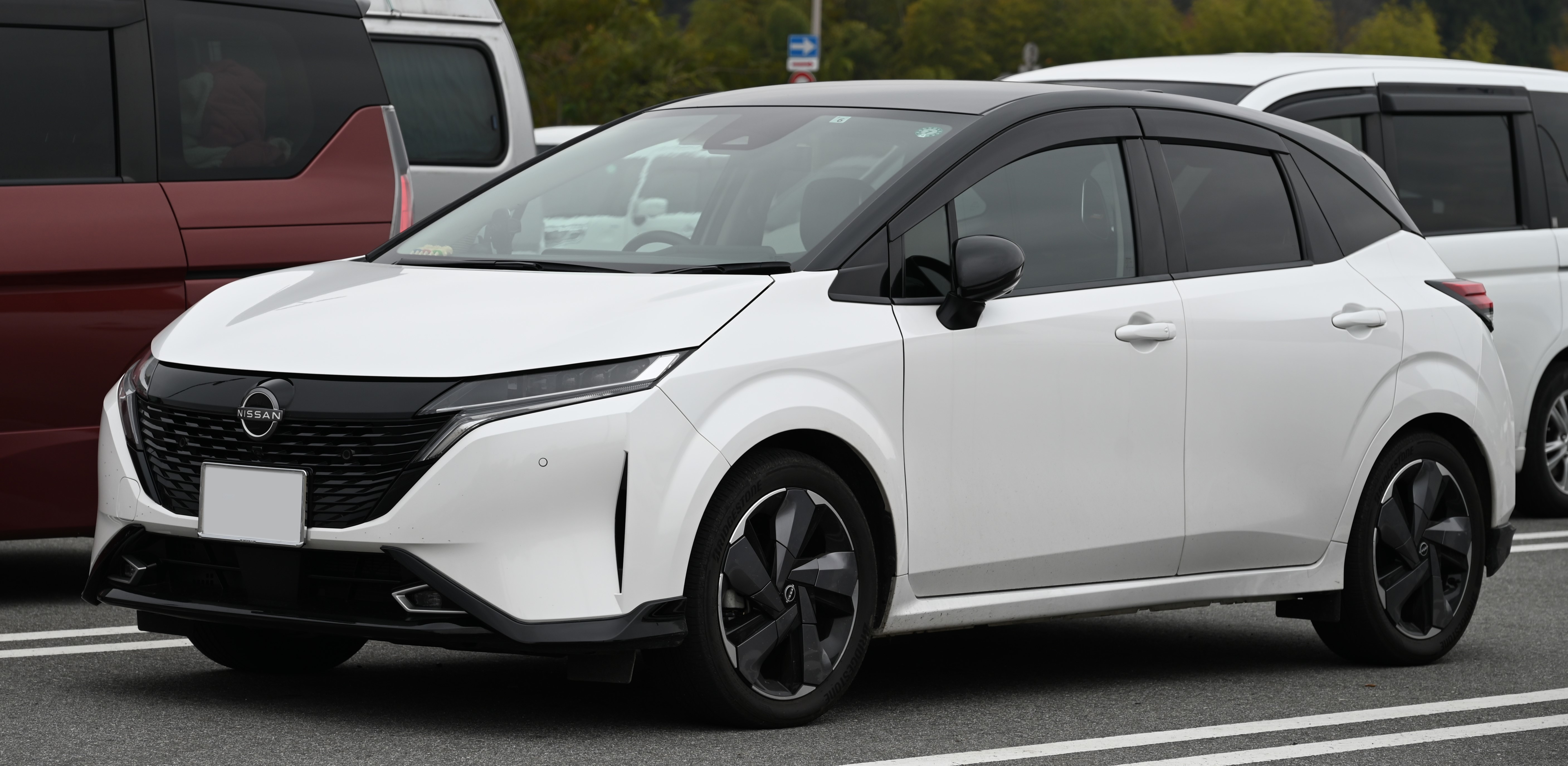
Note Aura (pre-facelift)

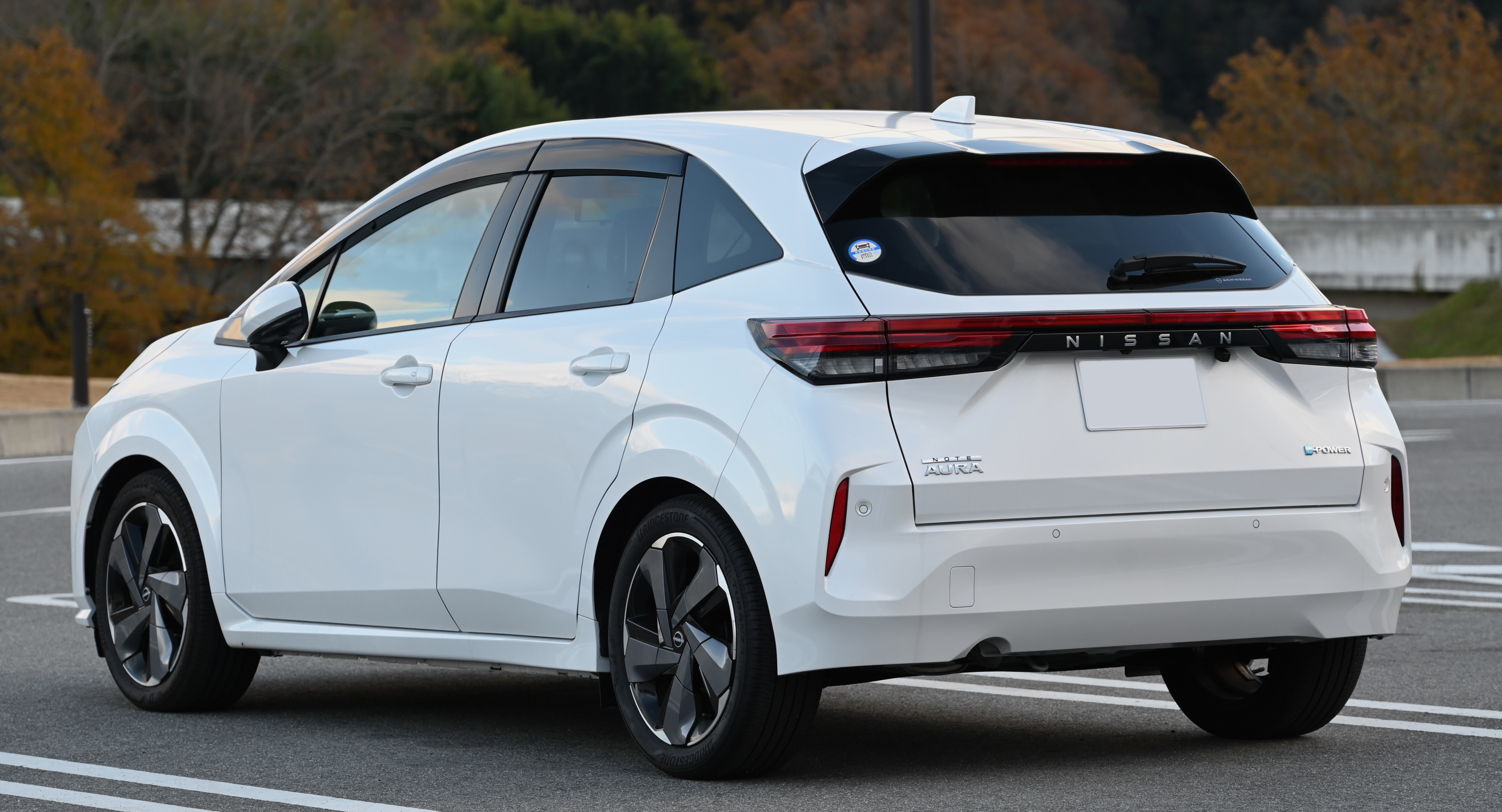
Rear view (pre-facelift)

Facelift

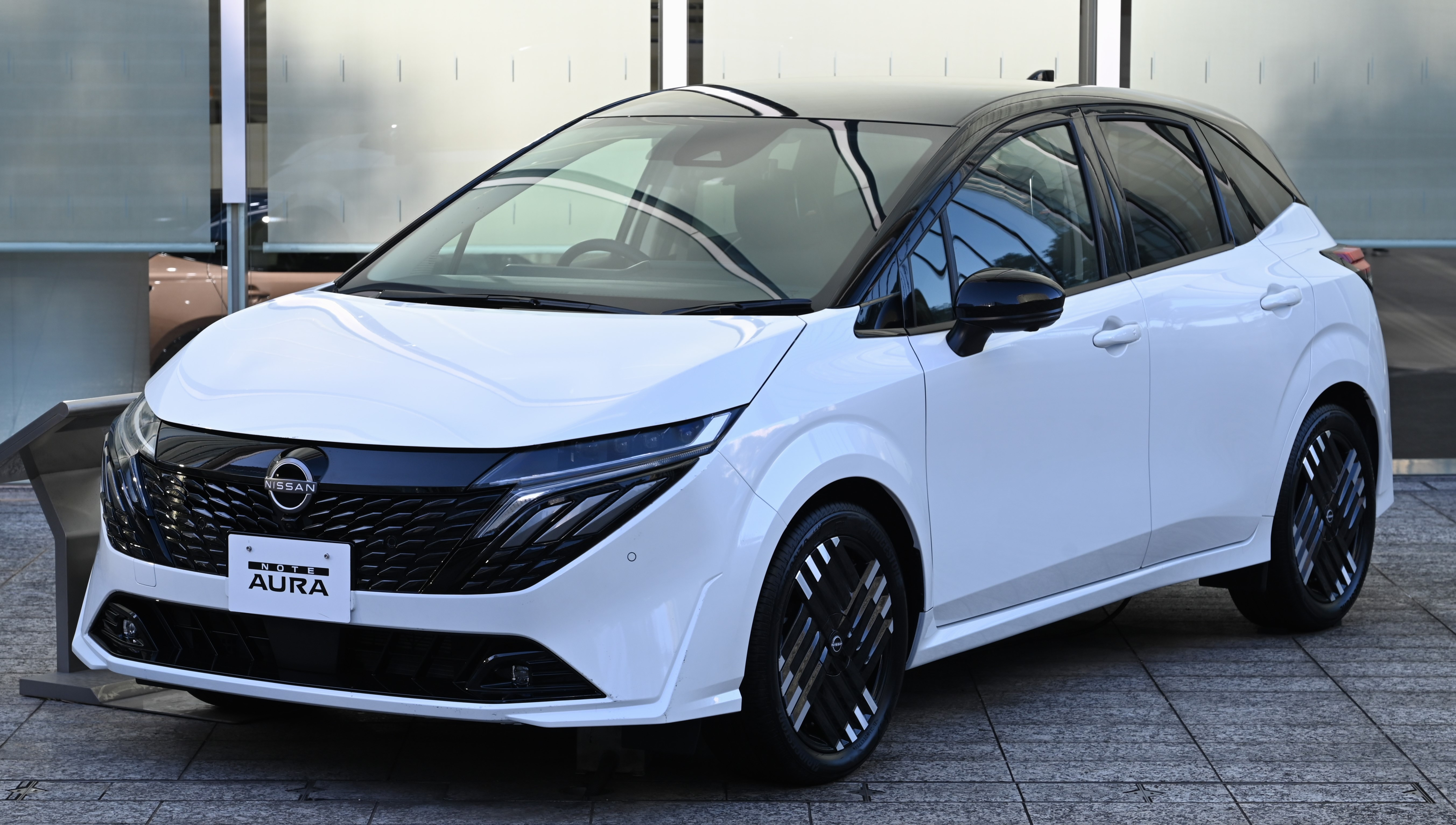
Note Aura (facelift)

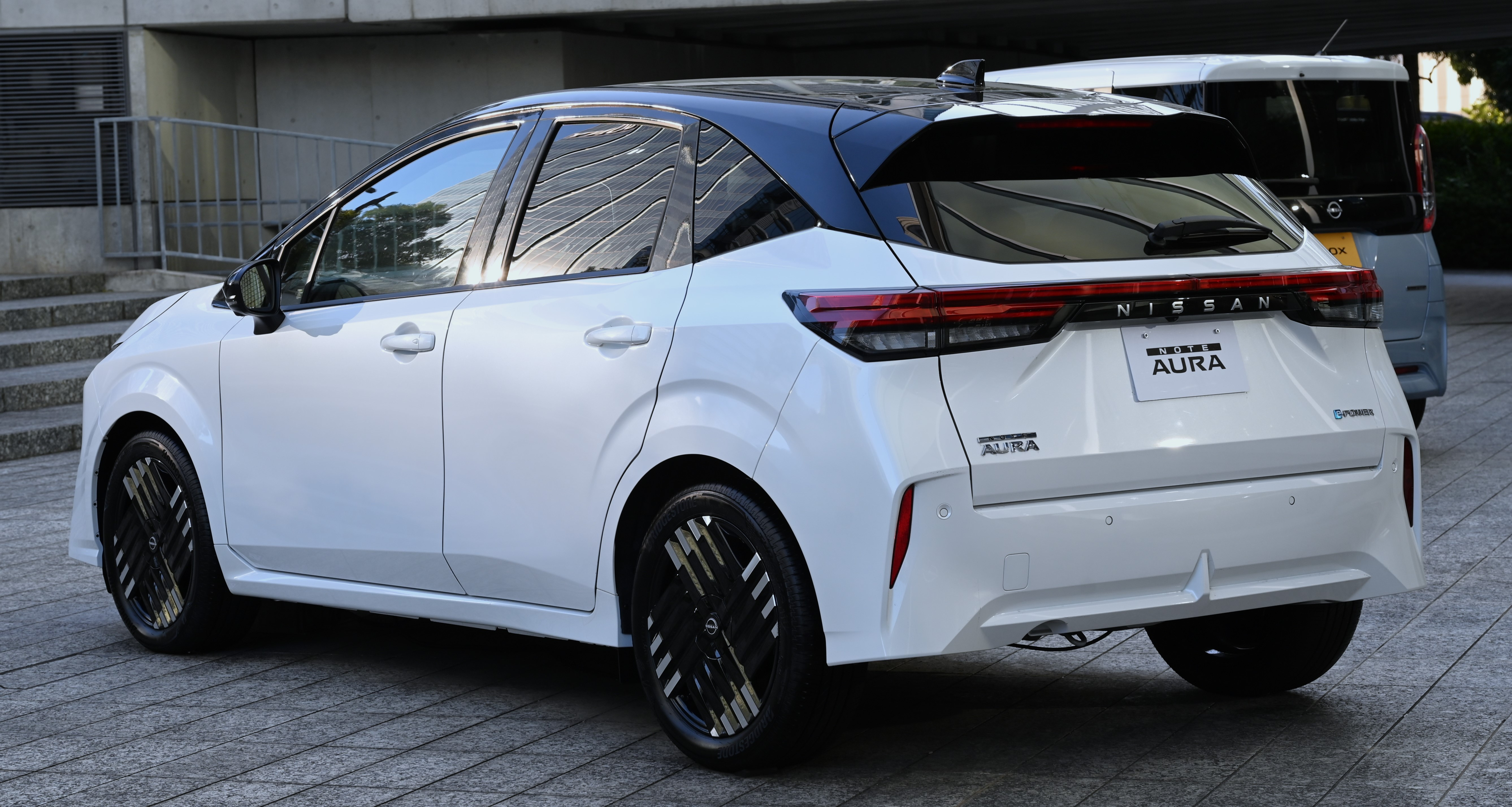
Rear view (facelift)

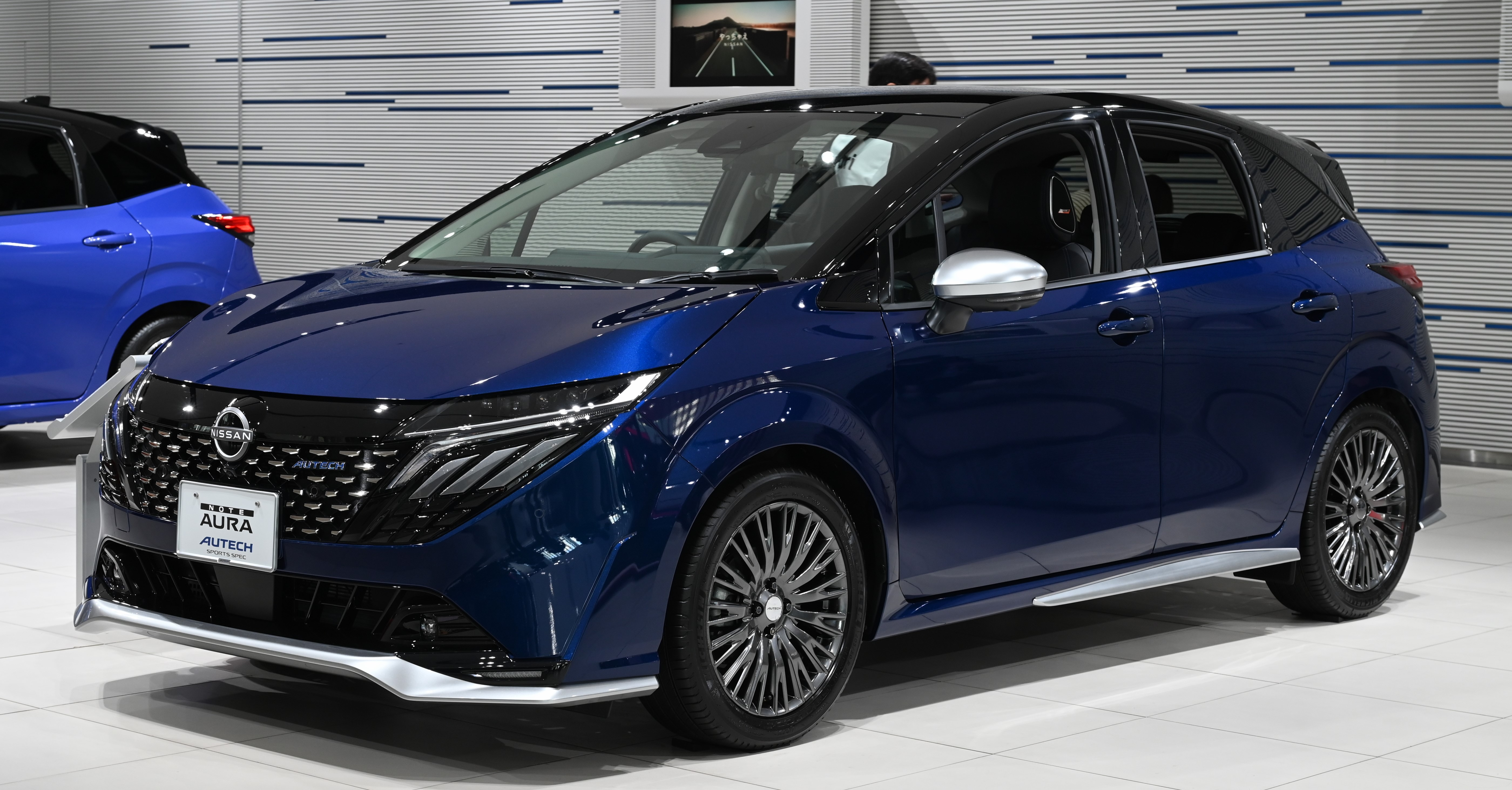
Note Aura Autech

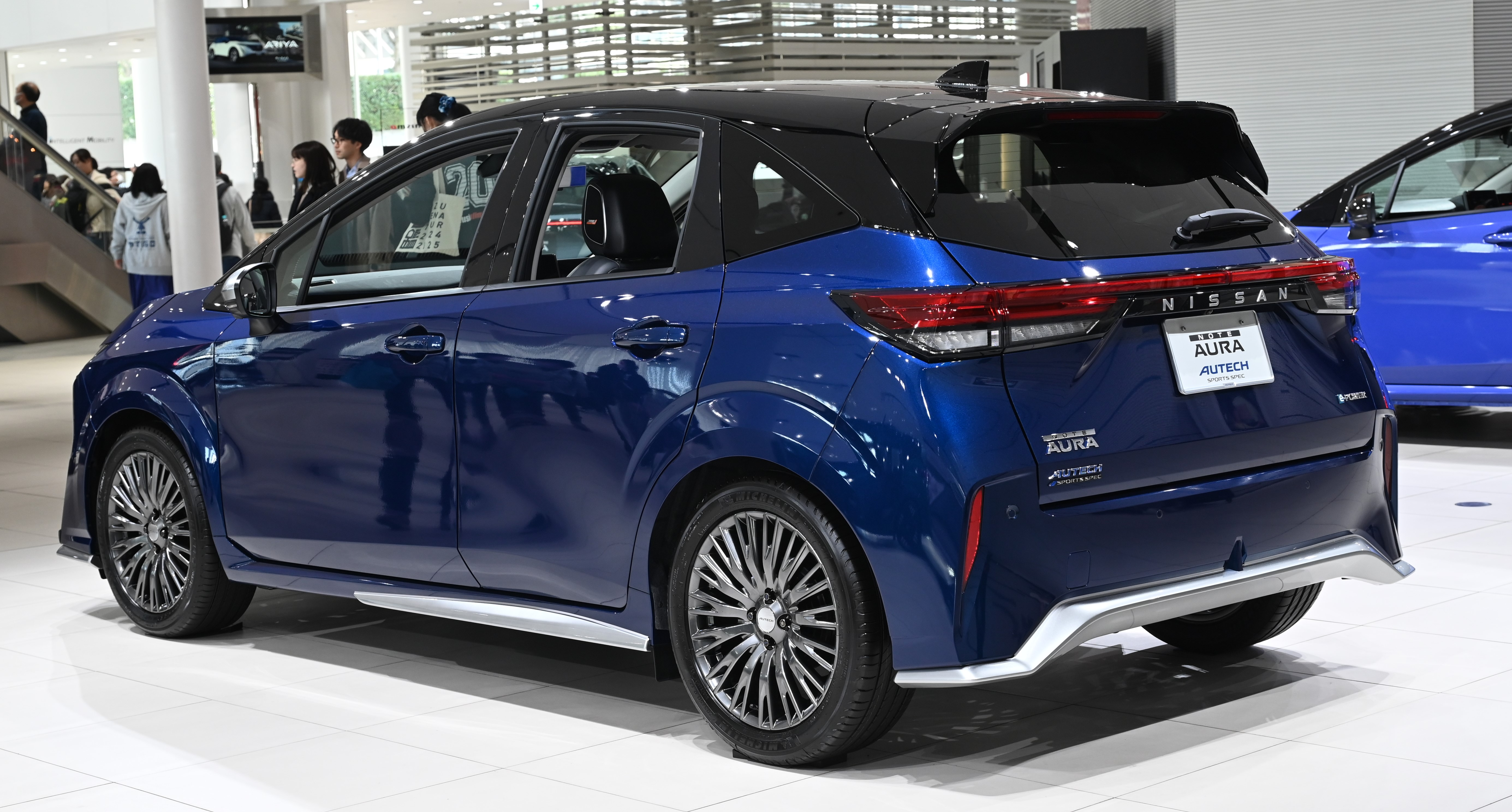
Rear view (Autech)

Note Aura NISMO

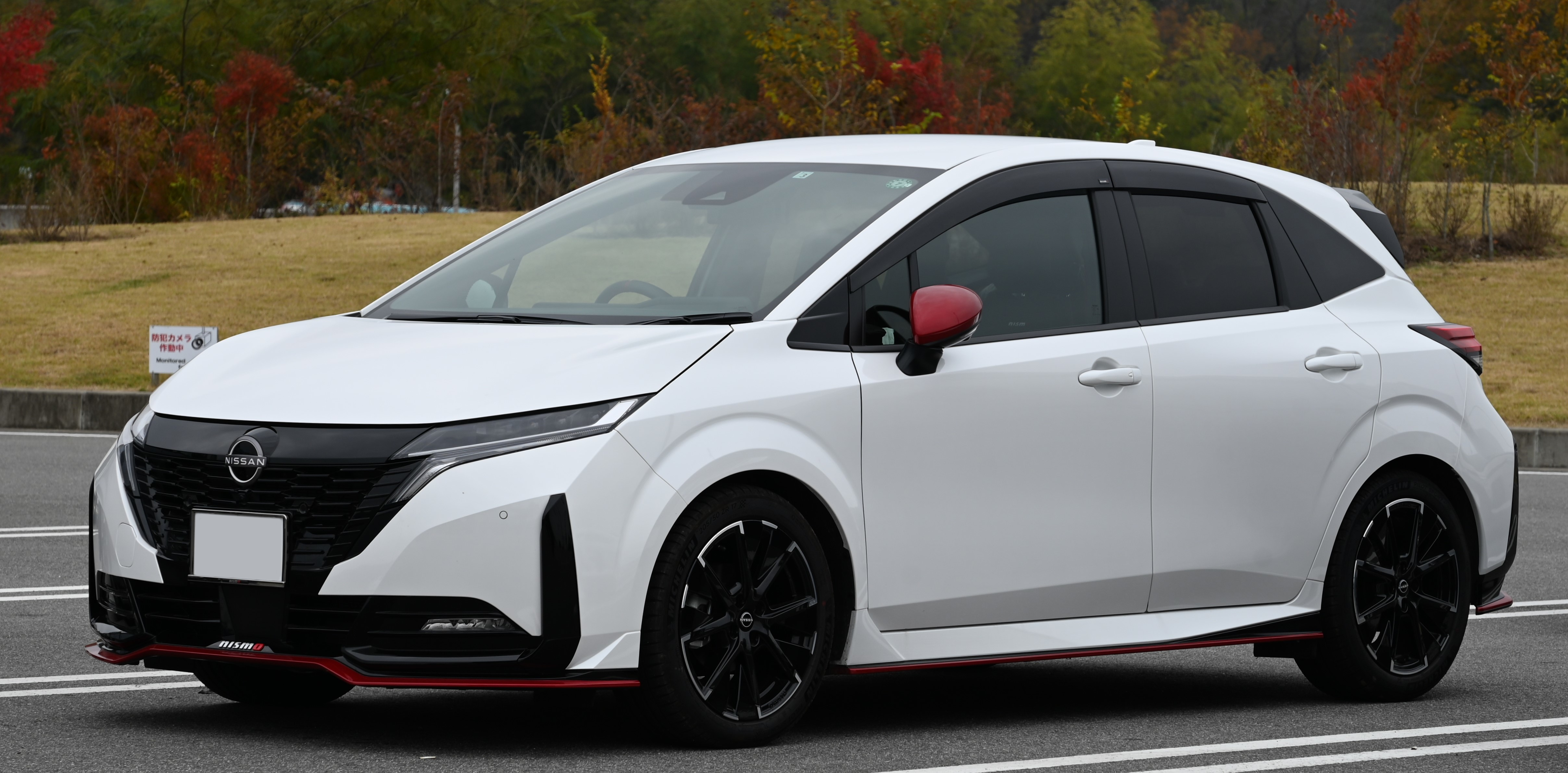
Note Aura Nismo

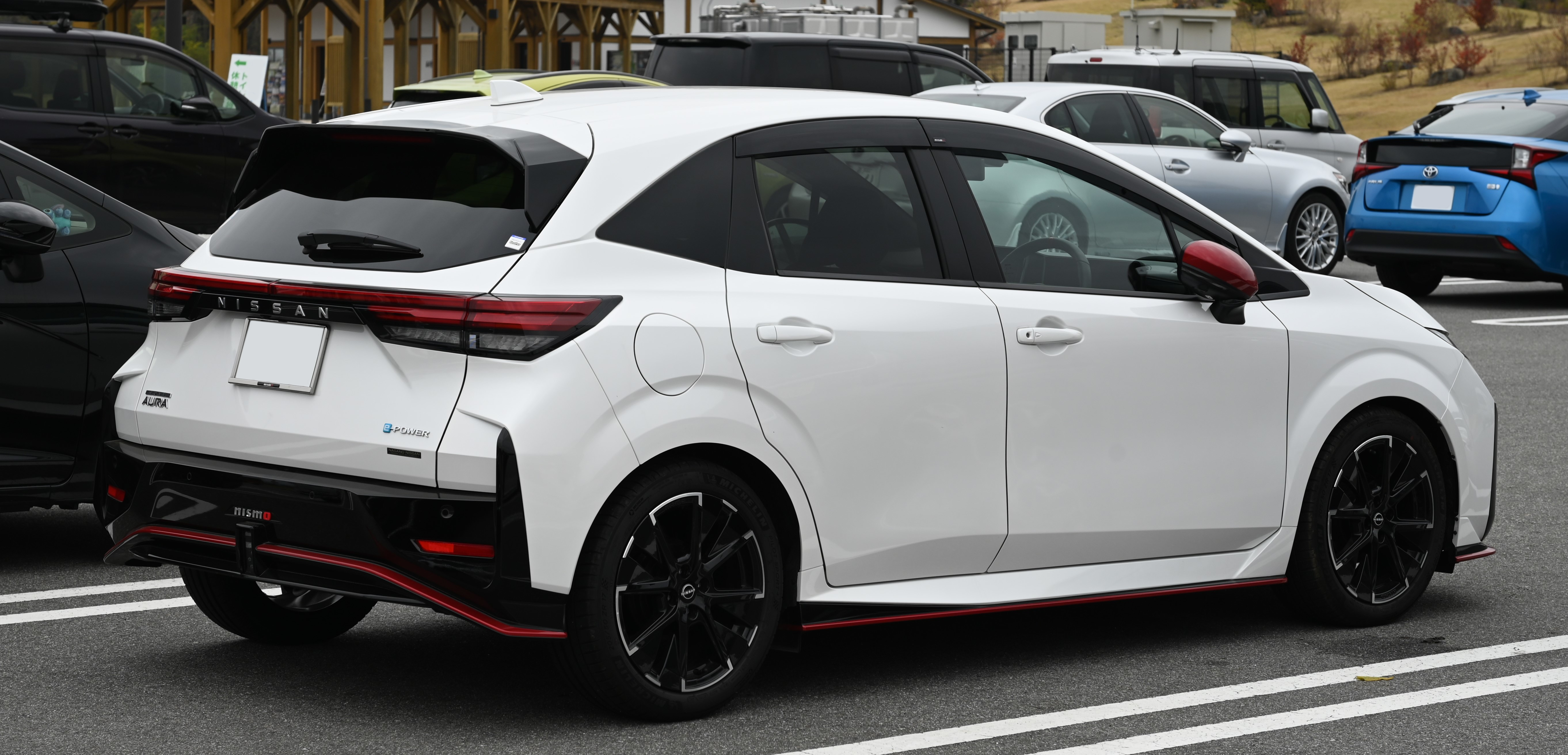
Rear view (Nismo)

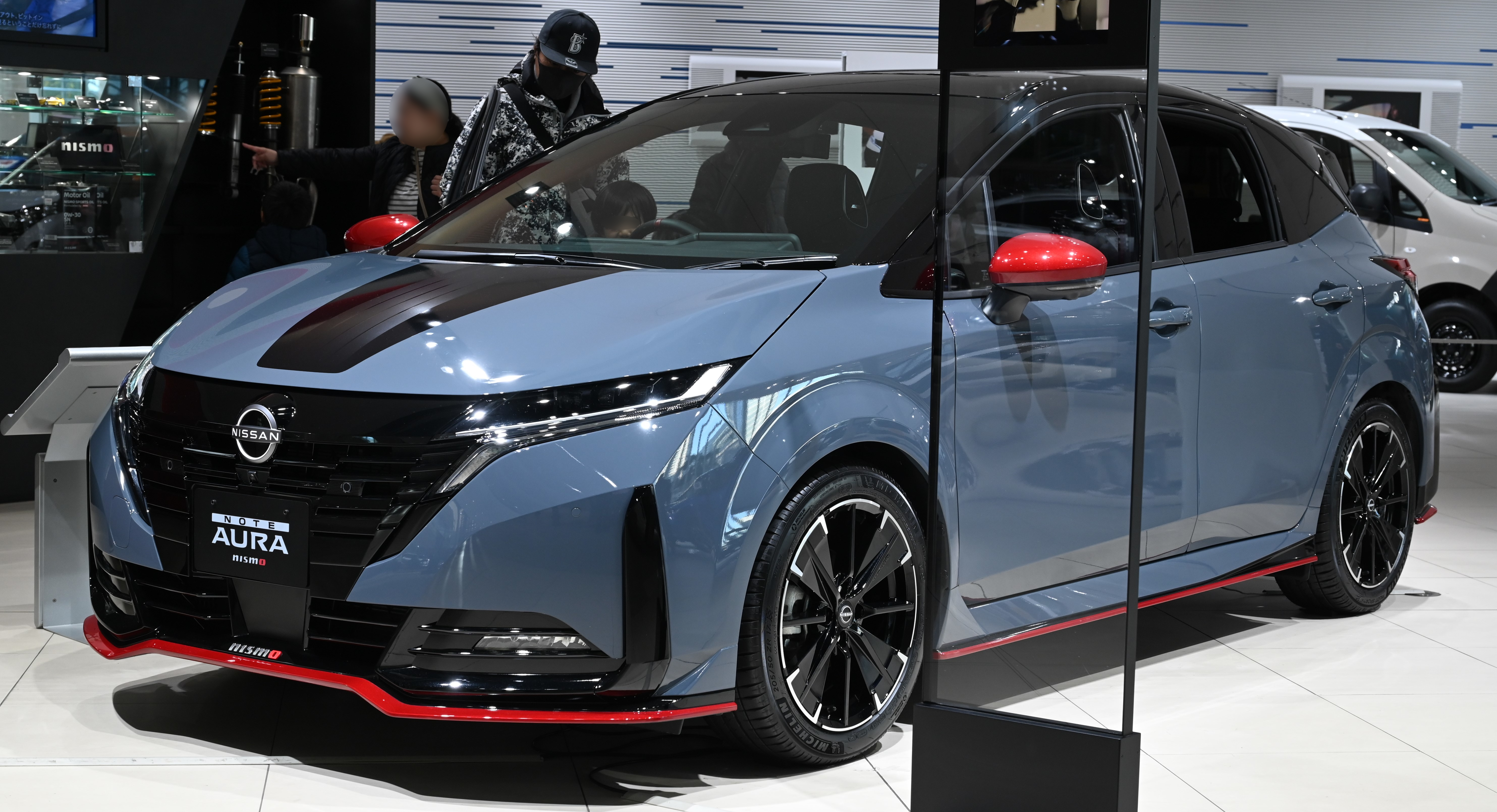
Note Aura Nismo (facelift)

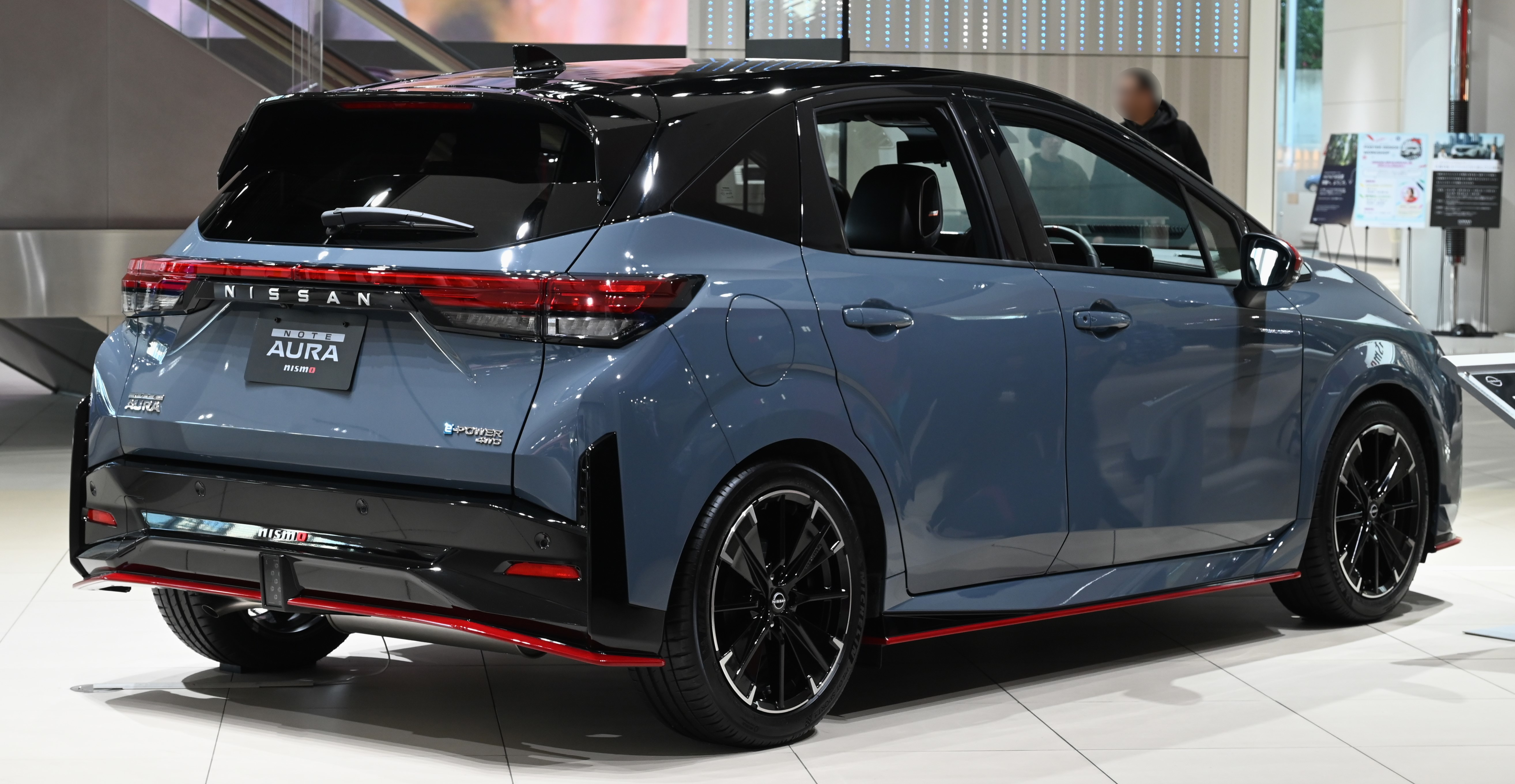
Rear view (facelift)

=== Note Autech Crossover ===
The Note Autech Crossover went on sale in October 2021 in Japan. It is a version of the Note with a crossover body, with exclusive blue signature LEDs, metal-finish door mirrors, 25 mm of increased ground clearance via retuned suspension, and larger diameter tyres. Initial grades include X and X Four. The Autech Crossover was facelifted in May 2024, shortly after the rest of the Note lineup. The new model has redesigned bumpers and additional metal-finish elements including roof rails and a trim piece at the rear bumpers.

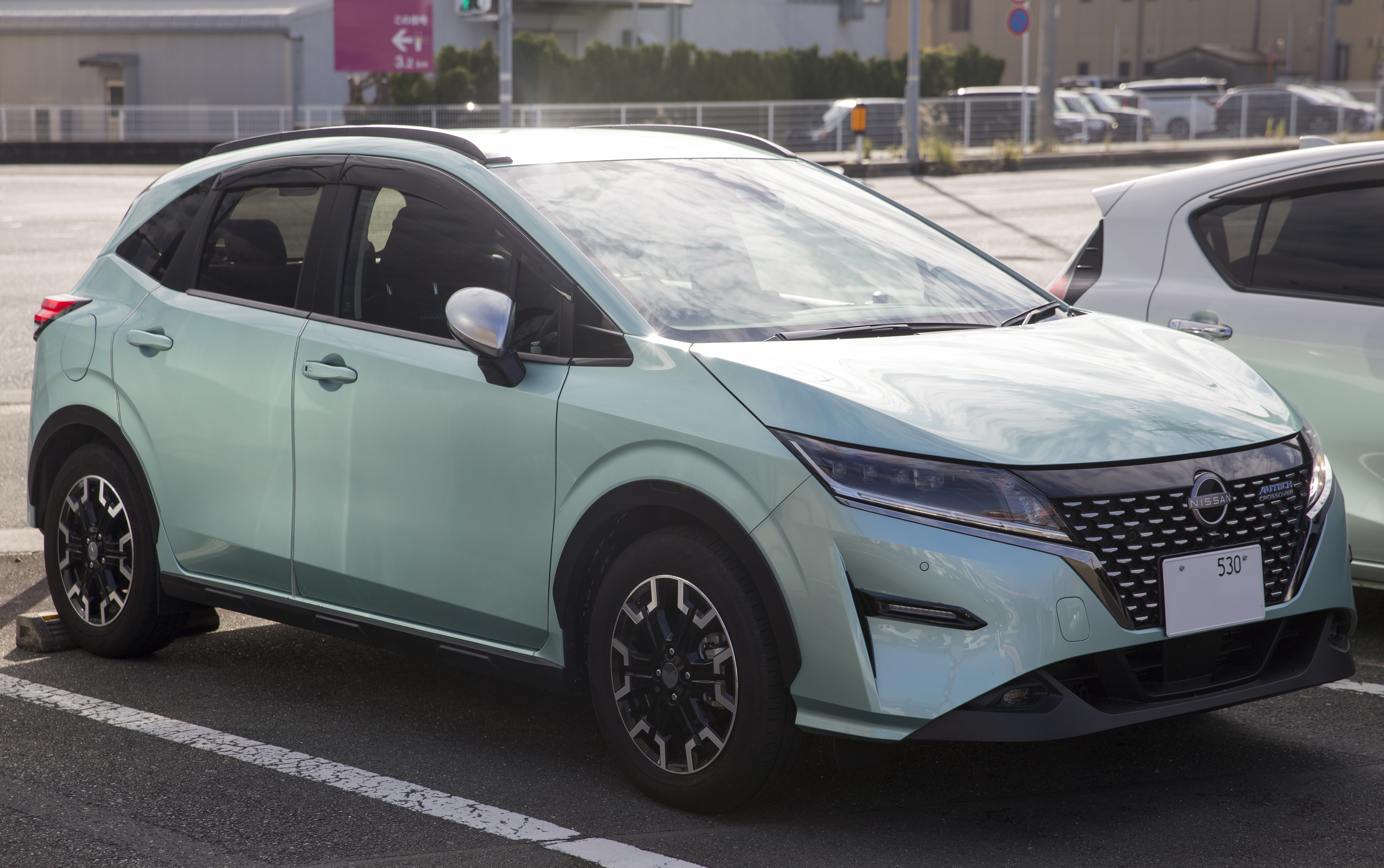
Note Autech Crossover (pre-facelift)

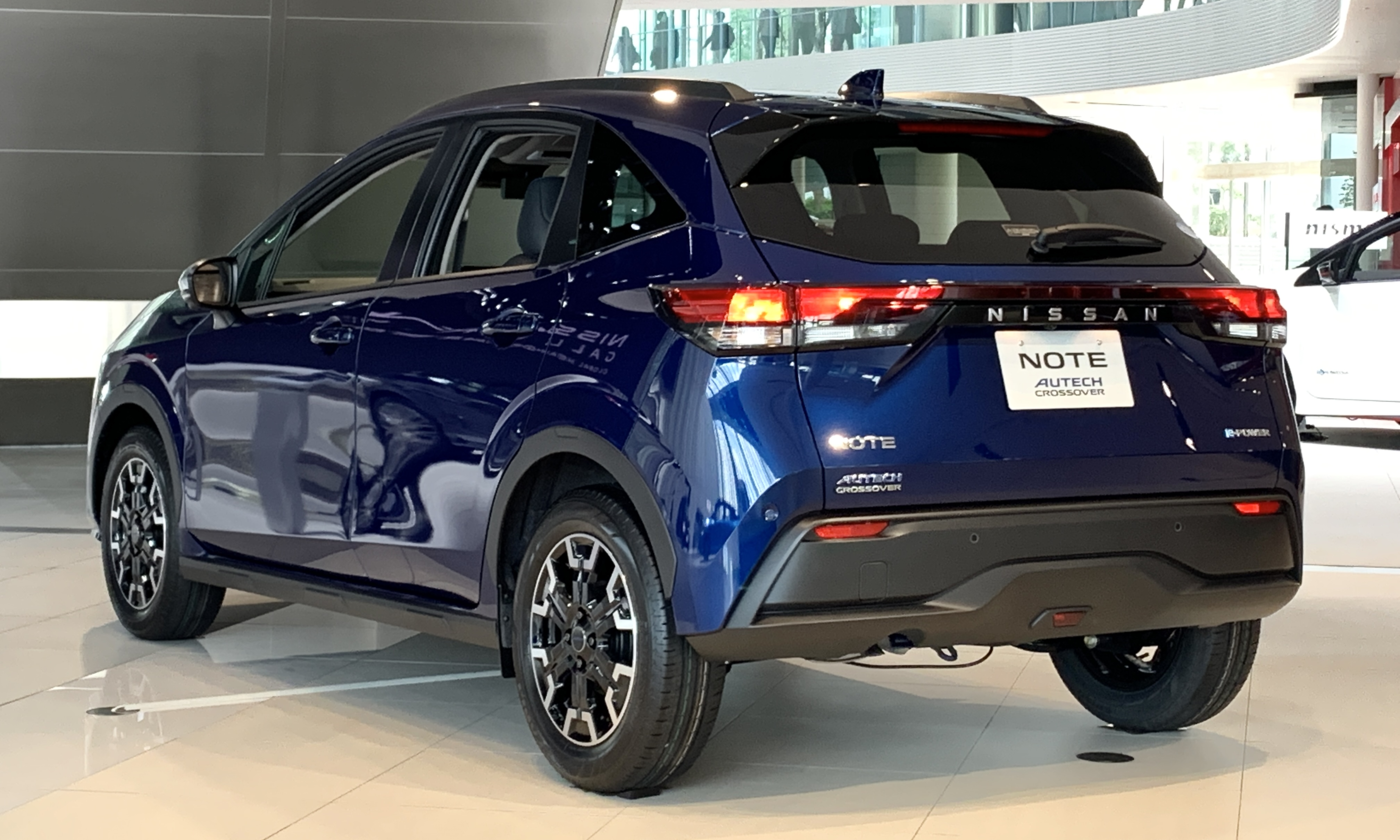
Rear view (pre-facelift)

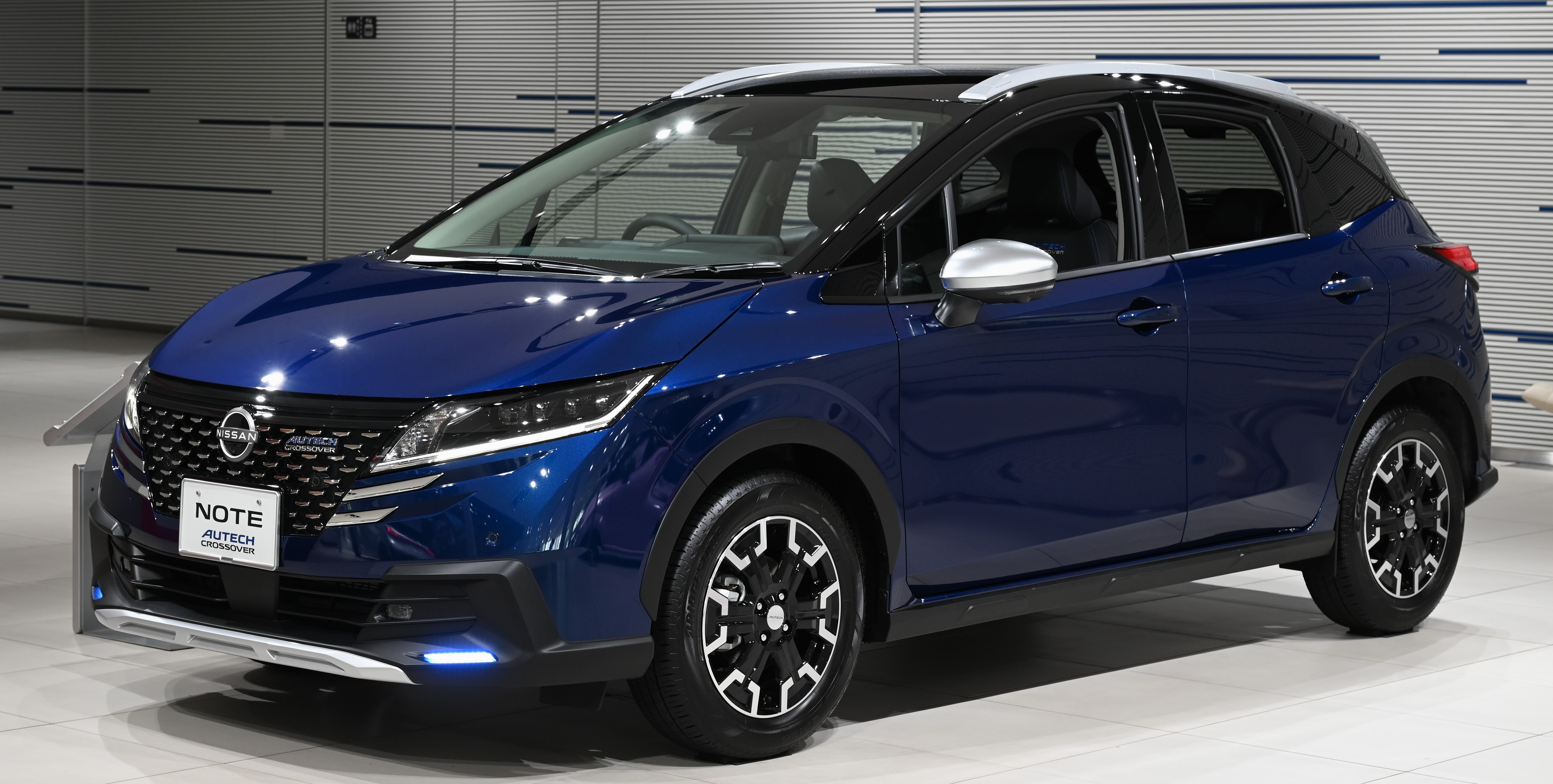
Note Autech Crossover (2024 facelift)

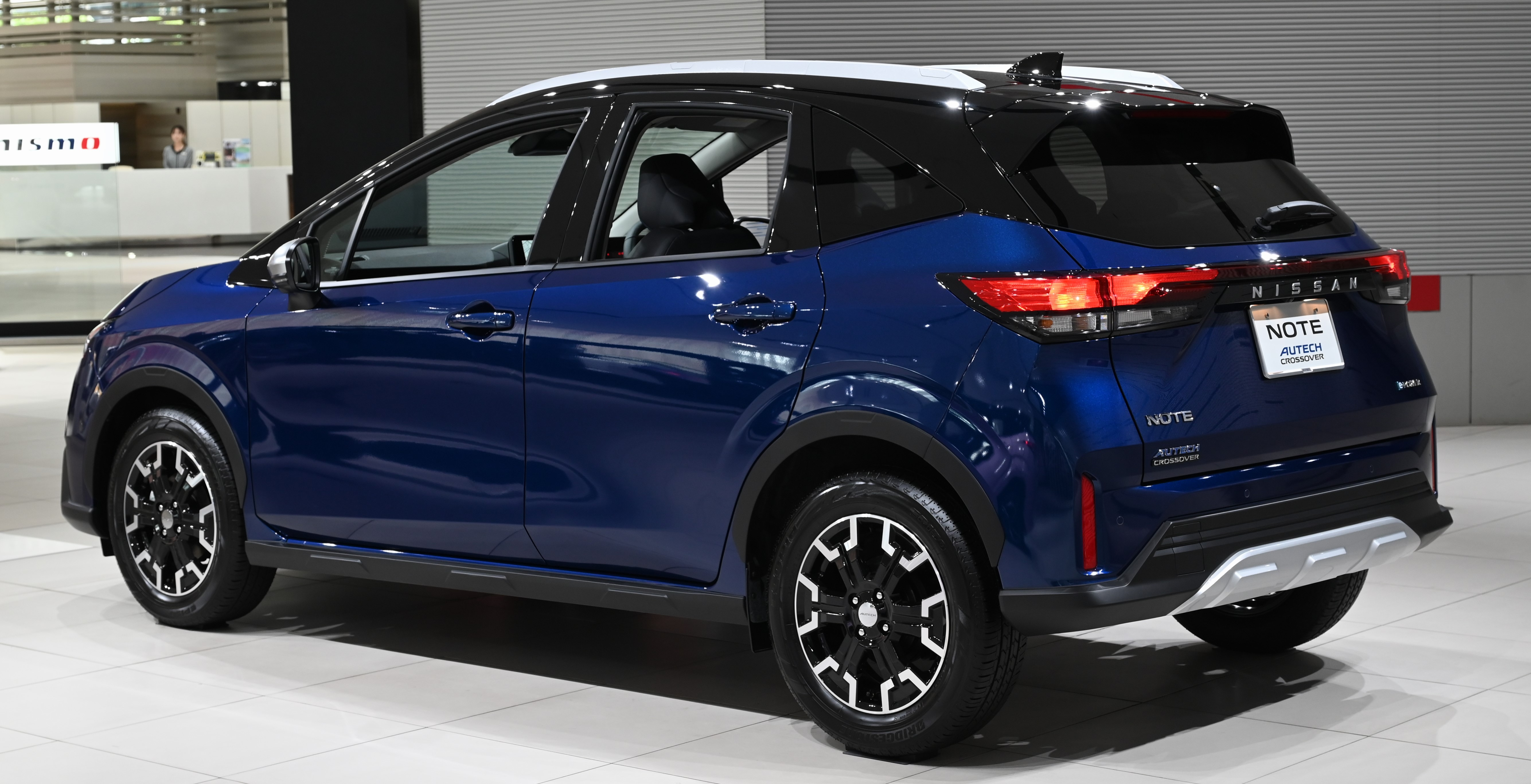
Rear view (2024 facelift)

=== Powertrain ===
Model	Powertrain type	Power, torque @ rpm
Note e-Power (6AA-E13); Note e-Power AWD (6AA-SNE13)	1,198 cc (1.2 L; 73.1 cu in) I3 (HR12DE, generator only)	60 kW (82 PS; 80 hp) @ 6000 rpm, 103 N⋅m (76 lb⋅ft) @ 4800 rpm
Note e-Power (6AA-E13); Note e-Power AWD (6AA-SNE13)	Front: electric AC motor (EM47)	85 kW (116 PS; 114 hp) @ 2900–10,341 rpm, 280 N⋅m (207 lb⋅ft) @ 0–2900 rpm
Note e-Power (6AA-E13); Note e-Power AWD (6AA-SNE13)	Rear: electric AC motor (MM48, AWD only)	50 kW (68 PS; 67 hp) @ 4775–10,024 rpm, 100 N⋅m (74 lb⋅ft) @ 0–4775 rpm
Note Aura e-Power (6AA-FE13); Note Aura e-Power AWD (6AA-FNE13)	1,198 cc (1.2 L; 73.1 cu in) I3 (HR12DE, generator only)	60 kW (82 PS; 80 hp) @ 6000 rpm, 103 N⋅m (76 lb⋅ft) @ 4800 rpm
Note Aura e-Power (6AA-FE13); Note Aura e-Power AWD (6AA-FNE13)	Front: electric AC motor (EM47)	100 kW (136 PS; 134 hp) @ 3183–8500 rpm, 300 N⋅m (221 lb⋅ft) @ 0–3183 rpm
Note Aura e-Power (6AA-FE13); Note Aura e-Power AWD (6AA-FNE13)	Rear: electric AC motor (MM48, AWD only)	50 kW (68 PS; 67 hp) @ 4775–10,024 rpm, 100 N⋅m (74 lb⋅ft) @ 0–4775 rpm

== Reception ==
In 2013, the Note won the RJC Car of the Year award, beating out the Suzuki Wagon R and the Mazda CX-5. Five years later, it became the top-selling compact car in Japan for 2018 and won the Japanese environmental award on the same year.

The E13 Note won Car of the Year Japan for 2021-2022.

== Sales ==
Year	Japan	Europe
2005	93,925	
2006	69,863	71,659
2007	55,659	65,945
2008	62,704	59,339
2009	65,745	51,742
2010	66,347	45,412
2011	46,475	35,448
2012	85,330	31,386
2013	147,634	33,087
2014	106,765	65,579
2015	97,995	46,267
2016	102,402	35,884
2017	138,905	12,546
2018	136,324	145
2019	118,472	9
2020	72,205	
2021	90,177	
2022	110,113	
2023	102,508	
2024	101,766	
