= 2008 Paris Motor Show =

International auto show

- Genre: Auto show
- Begins: October 4, 2008
- Ends: October 19, 2008
- Venue: Paris Expo Porte de Versailles
- Location: Paris
- Country: France
- Previous event: 2006 Paris Motor Show
- Next event: 2010 Paris Motor Show

The 2008 Paris Motor Show took place from 4 October to 19 October 2008, in Paris expo Porte de Versailles.

This edition of the Paris Motor Show featured a high number of hybrid and electric vehicles (EVs), that led a blogger with The New York Times to ask, "Who killed the non-electric cars?".

== Concept cars ==
- Audi A1 Sportback
- BMW X1 (E84)
- BMW 7 Series ActiveHybrid
- Chevrolet Orlando
- GT by Citroën
- Citroën C-Cactus Hybrid
- Citroën Hypnos
- Honda Insight
- Lada Revolution III
- Lamborghini Estoque
- Lexus LF-Xh
- Maserati GranTurismo MC
- Mazda Kiyora
- Mercedes-Benz ConceptFASCINATION
- MINI Crossover
- Nissan Nuvu
- Optimal Energy Joule
- Peugeot Prologue
- Peugeot RC
- Pininfarina B0
- Renault Ondelios
- Renault Z.E.
- Saab 9-X Air BioHybrid
- SsangYong C200

== Production cars ==
- Aston Martin One-77
- Audi RS6
- Audi S4
- Bentley Arnage Final Edition
- BMW 3 Series E90 mid-life refresh
- BMW 7 Series F01
- Cadillac CTS Sport Wagon
- Chevrolet Cruze
- Chevrolet Volt (European, auto show introduction)
- Citroën C3 Picasso (introduced as the "Drooneel" concept car)
- Dacia Logan MCV facelift
- Dacia Logan eco2
- Dacia Sandero
- Ferrari California
- Fiat 500 Abarth SS
- Ford Fiesta Panel Van
- Ford Ka Mk II
- Ford Kuga Individual
- Hyundai i20
- Infiniti EX37
- Infiniti FX37
- Kia Soul
- Lexus IS 250C/350C convertible
- Lumeneo SMERA (battery electric quadricycle)
- Mazda MX-5 mid-life facelift
- Mercedes-Benz S400 BlueHybrid
- Mitsubishi Lancer Sportback
- Nissan Note
- Nissan Pixo
- Opel Insignia
- Peugeot 308 CC
- Peugeot 407 restyle
- PGO Hemera
- Porsche 911 Targa (update)
- Porsche Boxster S Porsche Design Edition 2
- Porsche Cayenne S Transsyberia
- Porsche Cayman S Sport
- Renault Kangoo II Be Bop
- Renault Laguna III Coupe
- Renault Mégane Mk III
- SEAT Exeo
- Smart Fortwo ED (Electric Drive)
- Subaru Forester (European diesel introduction)
- Suzuki Alto
- Suzuki SX4 FCV
- Škoda Octavia, Mk II restyle
- Toyota Avensis
- Toyota iQ
- Toyota Urban Cruiser
- Volkswagen Golf 6
- Volvo C30/S40/V50 1.6D DRIVe

== Motorsport cars ==
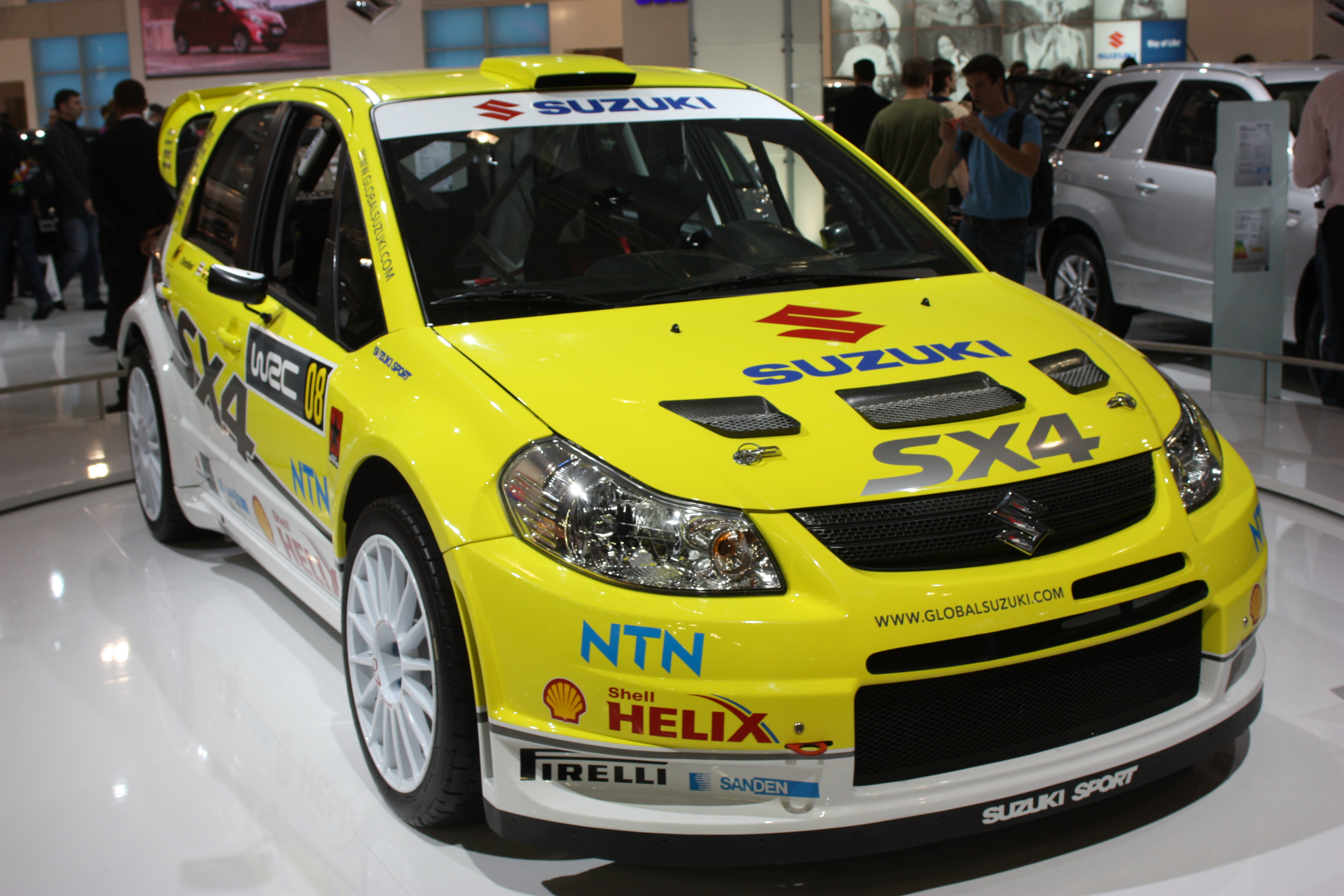
Suzuki SX4 WRC at Paris 2008

- Citroën C4 WRC Hymotion 4 (Eco-Concept)
- Peugeot 207 WRC
- Suzuki SX4 WRC

== Taxis du Monde ==
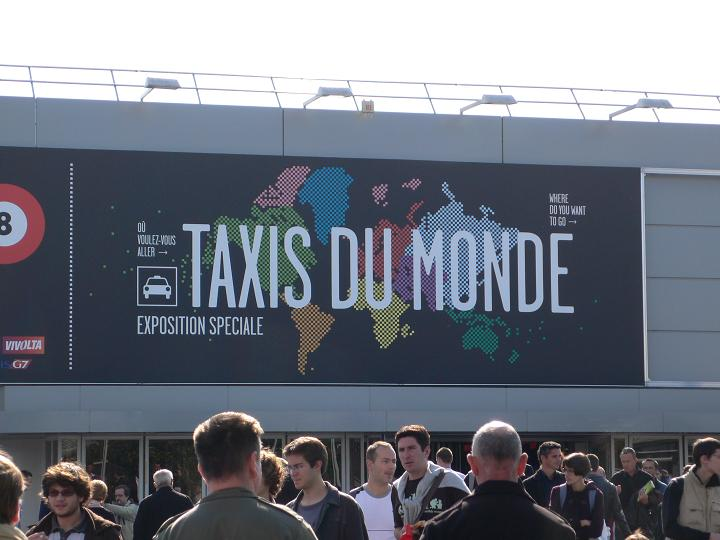
entrance to Taxis du Monde exhibition in Hall 8

As usual, Hall 8 hosted a special exhibition. In this edition, the subject was "Taxis du Monde" (Taxis from around the world), and it featured a variety of taxi vehicles from different cities and eras, such as a New York checker cab, a Chicago yellow cab, London black cabs, a Manila Jeepney, a Bangkok Tuk Tuk, etc., as well as several Parisian taxis, starting with the classic Renault Taxi de la Marne and ending with the proposed future taxi Peugeot Expert Tepee.

== See also ==
- Paris Motor Show
