= Saab 9-X Air =

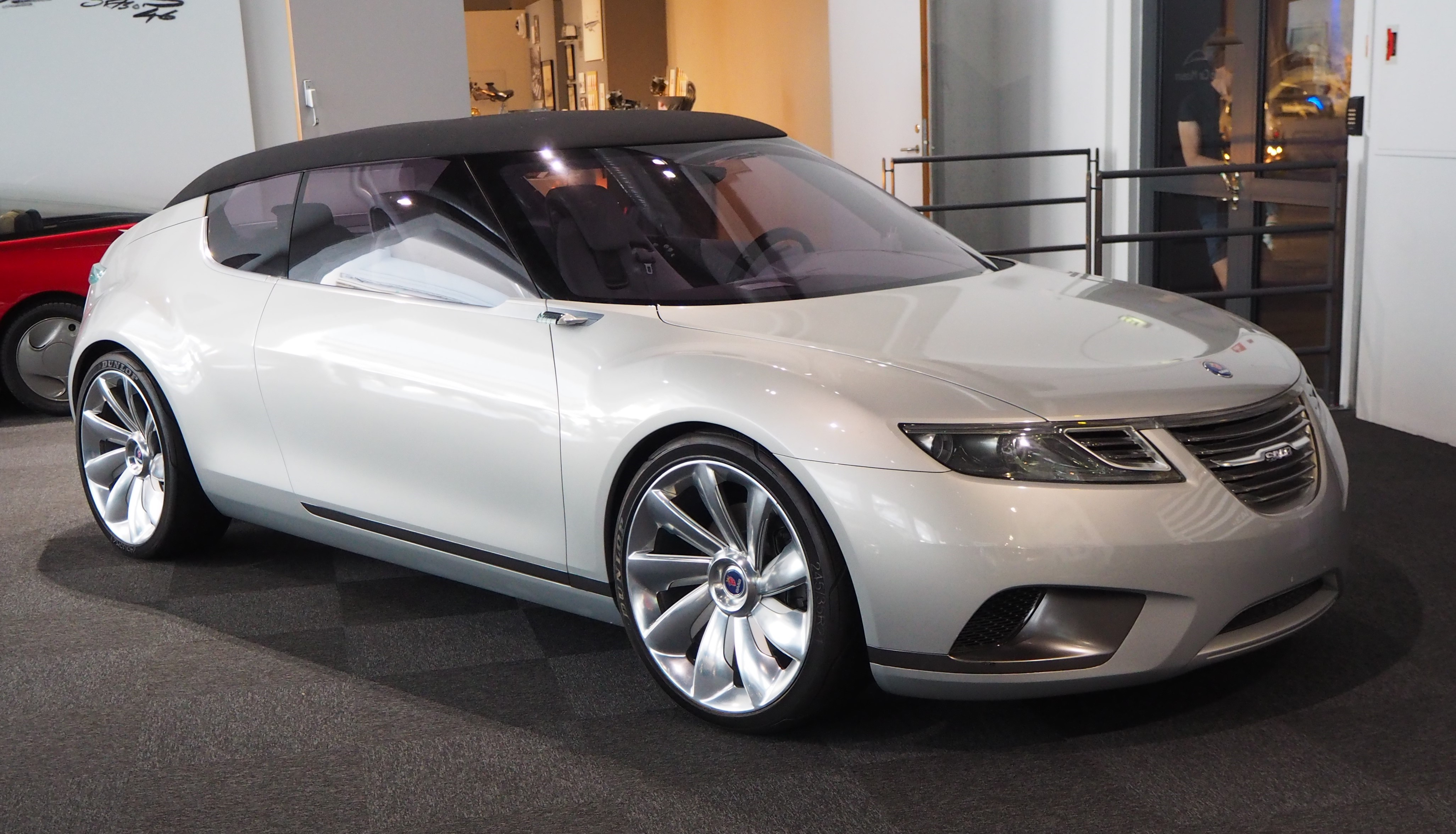
Saab 9-X Air in the Saab Museum

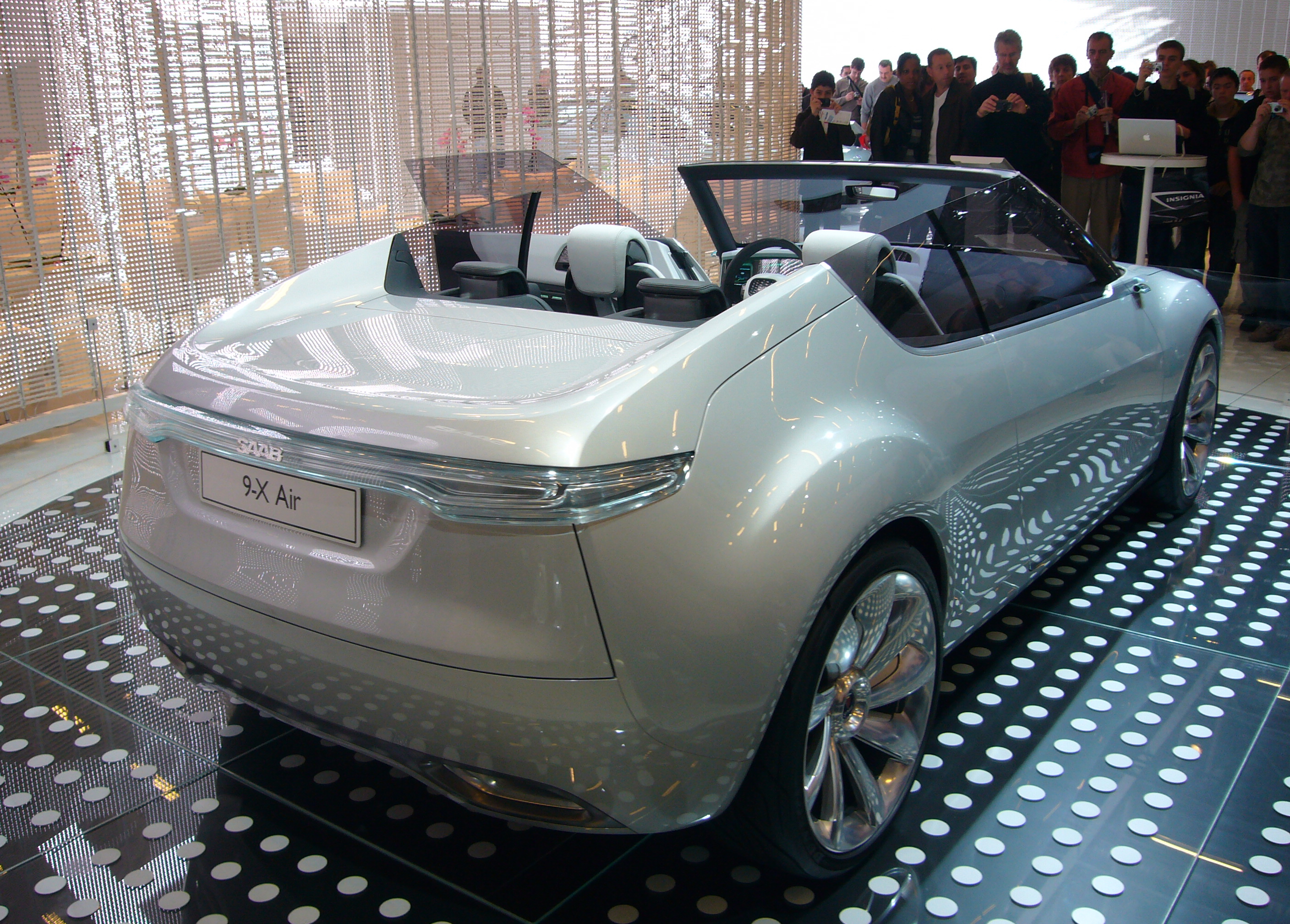
Saab 9-X Air at the 2008 Paris Motor Show

The Saab 9-X Air is a concept car created by Saab Automobile. It was first shown at the 2008 Paris Motor Show. It is a convertible version of the Saab 9-X Biohybrid, with a canvas roof referred to as the "Canopy Top" by Saab. The car is a plug-in hybrid combining an E100 turbocharged engine giving 260 hp (194 kW) combined with two electric motors.
