= Mercedes-Benz E-Class (W212) =

Fourth generation of Mercedes-Benz E-Class

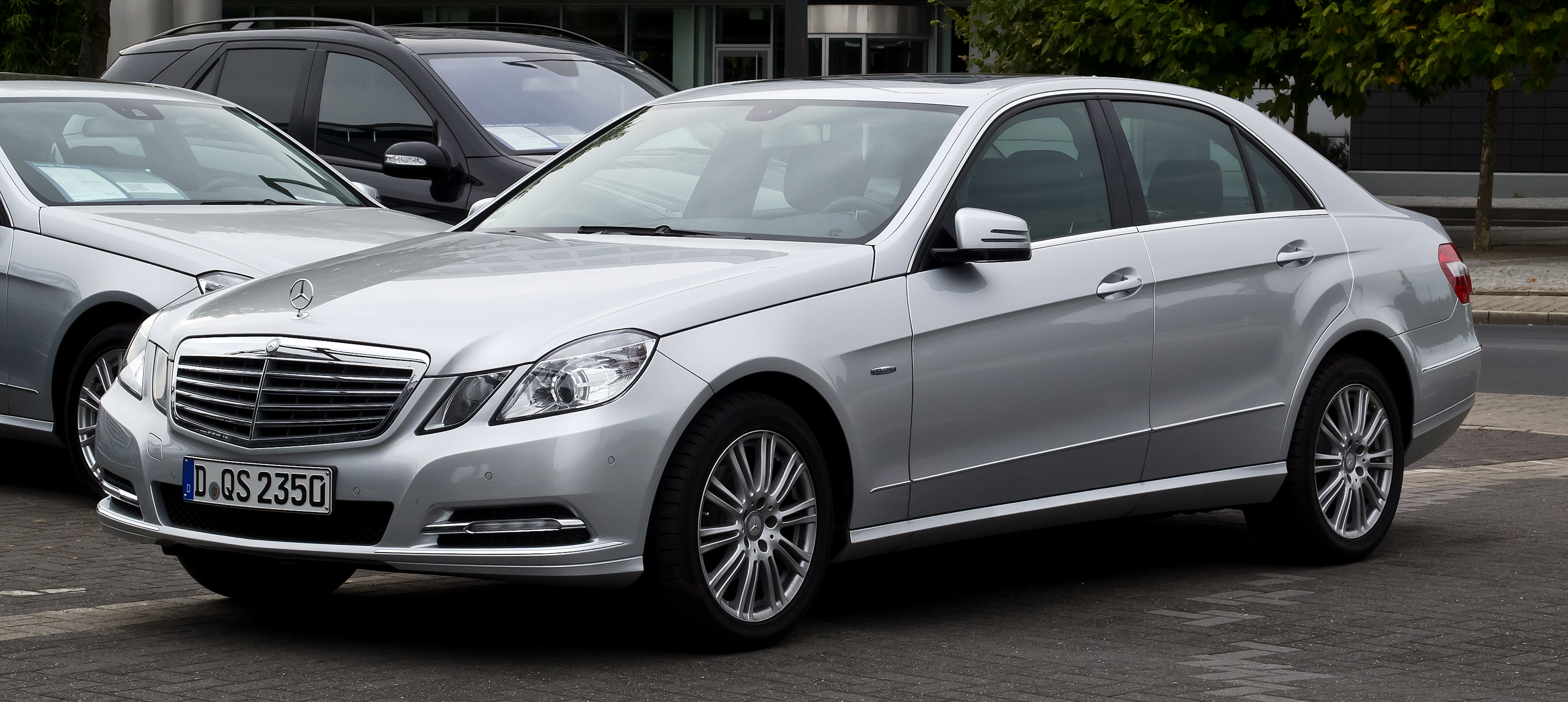

Overview
- Manufacturer: Daimler AG
- Model code: W212 (Saloon); S212 (Wagon)
- Production: March 2008 – January 2016 (sedan); December 2008 – May 2016 (station wagon)
- Model years: 2009–2016
- Assembly: Germany: Sindelfingen; Mexico: Toluca; Egypt: 6th of October City (EGA); Malaysia: Pekan (DRB-HICOM); India: Pune (Mercedes-Benz India); China: Beijing (Beijing Benz); Thailand: Bangkok (TAAP); Indonesia: Bogor, West Java (MBDI); Vietnam: Ho Chi Minh City (MBV)
- Designer: Thomas Stopka (Original: 2005); Michael Frei (Facelift: 2011)

Body and chassis
- Class: Executive car (E)
- Body style: 4-door sedan 5-door station wagon
- Layout: Front engine, rear-wheel drive / four-wheel drive (4Matic)
- Related: Mercedes-Benz E-Class Coupé/Cabriolet (C207/A207); Mercedes-Benz CLS-Class (C218)

Powertrain
- Engine: Petrol: 1.6 L M274 BlueEFFICIENCY turbo I4; 1.8 L M271 CGI BlueEFFICIENCY turbo I4; 2.0 L M274 CGI BlueEFFICIENCY turbo I4; 3.0 L M272 V6; 3.0 L M276 CGI BlueEFFICIENCY V6; 3.5 L M272 V6; 3.5 L M276 CGI BlueEFFICIENCY V6; 3.5 L M276 CGI BlueEFFICIENCY hybrid V6; 4.7 L M278 twin-turbo V8; 5.5 L M273 V8; 5.5 L M157 AMG twin-turbo V8; 6.2 L M156 AMG V8; Diesel: 2.1 L OM651 CDI/BlueTEC turbo I4; 2.1 L OM651 BlueTEC turbo hybrid I4; 3.0 L OM642 CDI/BlueTEC turbo V6
- Transmission: 6-speed manual; 5-speed 5G-Tronic automatic; 7-speed 7G-Tronic automatic; 9-speed 9G-Tronic automatic (BlueTEC, Facelift)

Dimensions
- Wheelbase: 2,874 mm (113.1 in) (Saloon/Estate); 3,014 mm (118.7 in) (V 212 LWB)
- Length: 4,868 mm (191.7 in) (Saloon); 5,019 mm (197.6 in) (LWB); 4,895 mm (192.7 in) (Estate)
- Width: 1,854 mm (73.0 in) (Saloon/Estate)
- Height: 1,470 mm (57.9 in) (Saloon); 1,474 mm (58.0 in) (Estate)
- Kerb weight: 1,540–2,000 kg (3,395–4,409 lb)

Chronology
- Predecessor: Mercedes-Benz E-Class (W211)
- Successor: Mercedes-Benz E-Class (W213)

The W212 and S212 Mercedes-Benz E-Class series is the fourth generation of the E-Class range of executive cars which was produced by Mercedes-Benz between 2009 and 2016 as the successor to the W211 E-Class. The body styles of the range are either four-door sedan/saloon (W212) or a five-door estate/wagon (S212). Coupé and convertible models of the E-Class of the same generation are W204 C-Class based and known as the C207 and A207, replacing the CLK-Class (C209 and A209) coupé and cabriolet. A high-performance E 63 AMG version of the W212 and S212 were available as well since 2009. In 2013, a facelift was introduced for the E-Class range, featuring significant styling changes, fuel economy improvements and updated safety features.

After being unveiled at the 2009 North American International Auto Show to invited members of the press and put on public display at the 2009 Geneva Motor Show, it was introduced in March 2009 for Europe and in July 2009 for North America in the saloon body style. In 2010, an estate body style became available to all markets, though the estate body style was available in Europe since August 2009. Global cumulative E-Class sales reached the milestone 550,000 vehicle mark in July 2011. Production achieved the milestone 500,000 saloon unit mark in March 2012.

The W212 E-Class was succeeded by the W213 E-Class in 2016 for the 2017 model year.

== Development ==
Design work began in 2004 after the development programme commenced in 2003, with the exterior design by Winifredo Camacho and interior design by Thomas Stopka being selected in 2005. After refinements and engineering considerations were made, the final design specifications were frozen in 2006. Certain elements of the exterior styling are taken from the preceding W204 C-Class and W221 S-Class each designed in 2002 and 2003. The bulging rear wheel arches are meant to be reminiscent of the fender flares of historic "Ponton" Mercedes models of the 1950s. The design of the W212 and C207 E-Class was previewed by the ConceptFASCINATION design study in September 2008.

== Body styles ==
=== Saloon ===
The W212 E-Class saloon was unveiled at the 2009 North American International Auto Show. The saloon went on sale in Europe in March 2009 as a 2010 model year automobile. The W212 E-Class has three trim levels of equipment and equipment levels: Classic, Elegance and Avantgarde.

The E-Class features several new safety technologies including driver drowsiness detection, lane departure warning, and traffic sign recognition. It also includes features that improve performance, efficiency, and comfort, such as "Direct Control" adaptive suspension, active seats (which change shape to support the passengers in corners), and movable radiator louvers which improve the vehicle's aerodynamics. Standard Mercedes-Benz safety and convenience features, such as the Electronic Stability Program (ESP), airbags, and automatic climate control, are included as well.

=== Estate ===
The estate version (chassis code S212) was unveiled at the 2009 Frankfurt Motor Show and was released for sale in Europe on 5 August. Early models include the four-cylinder-powered E 220 CDI BlueEFFICIENCY and E 250 CDI BlueEFFICIENCY, the V6-powered E 350 CDI BlueEFFICIENCY and E 350 CGI BlueEFFICIENCY, and the V8-powered E 500. US models began sales in June 2010 for the 2011 model year.

=== Coupé and convertible ===
The coupé (C207) was first shown at the 2009 Geneva Motor Show, while the convertible (A207) was unveiled at the 2010 North American International Auto Show. Both models replaced the previous C209/A209 CLK-Class models. The C207/A207 E-Class is based on the W204 C-Class platform, and are produced alongside each other in the Bremen plant.

== Styling ==
The 2009 E-Class’ design was inspired by the new design language Mercedes adopted at that time for the C-Class, S-Class, and CLS-Class. The design was considerably more angular and aggressive than its predecessors and Mercedes gave the rear haunch a bulge that they named the "Ponton flare" inspired by that of the Ponton cars from the 1950s and early '60s. Many of the changes made to give the E-Class a sportier appearance took design cues from a number of existing models, including the CLS-Class and the S-Class. The rising character line of the 2009 E-Class was inspired by the S-Class, as were the wheel-arch extensions, the door handles, and the enlarged bumpers. Meanwhile, the CLS-Class inspiration came in the form of the re-shaped headlights, featuring an edgier squared teardrop design as opposed to the previous ovoid shape. Other changes made on the 2009 model included a wider-framed grille, new air intakes, and an overall wedge-shaped profile. The 2009 E-Class has a drag coefficient of 0.25 to improve aerodynamic efficiency.

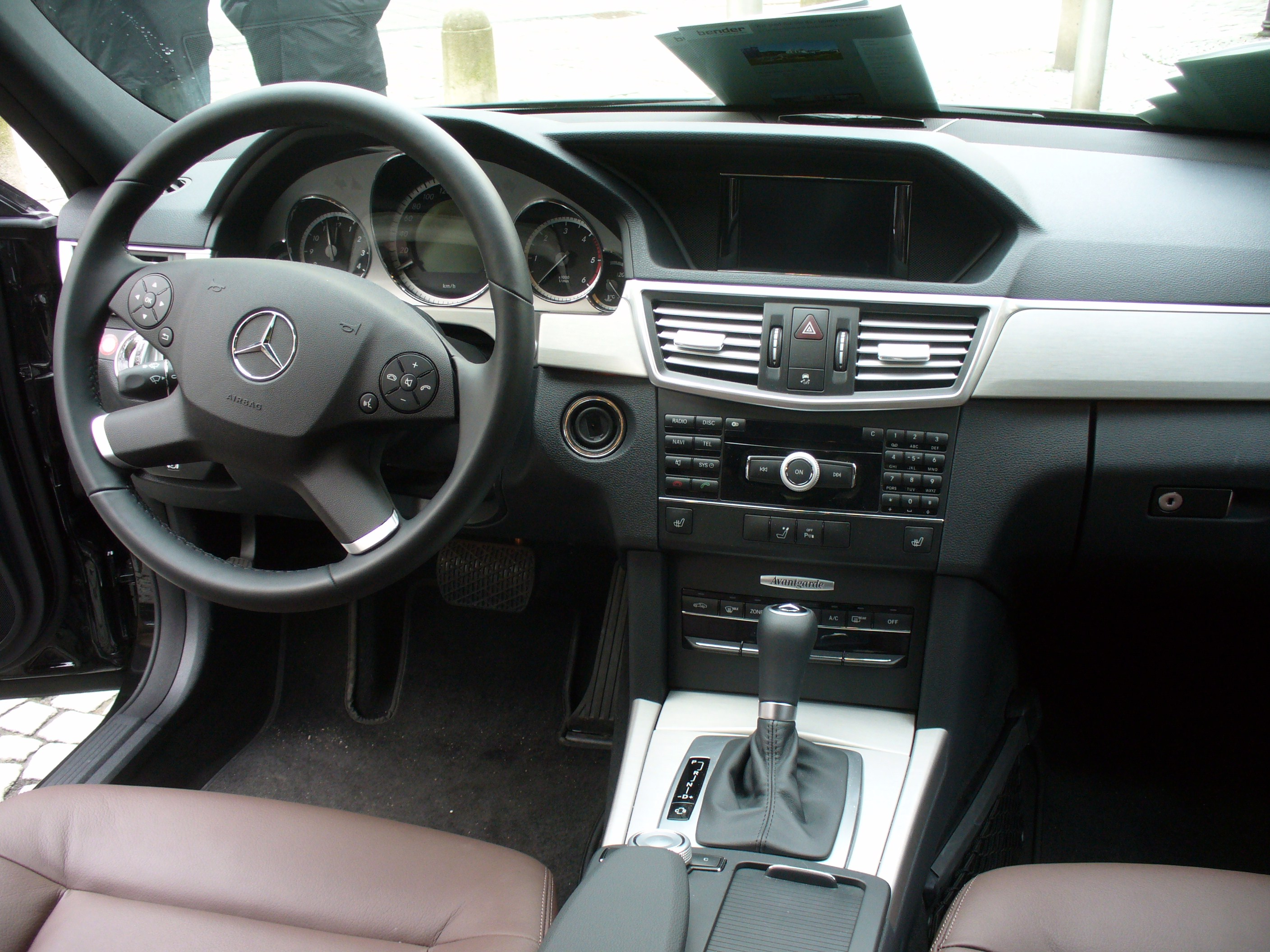
Interior (pre-facelift)

Mercedes gave the interior a subtle facelift, one that features a more spacious cockpit with height adjustable bucket front seats, remote power door locks, power mirrors, heated mirrors, four one-touch power windows, and remote window operation. There are also wood trims on the doors, dashboard, and centre console, front and rear reading lights, a leather steering wheel, an electrochromatic inside rearview mirror, and front and rear floor mats. The entertainment aspect comes from the plethora of electronically enhanced goodies like an AM/FM in-dash six-CD/DVD, CD-controller with CD MP3 playback stereo, Harman Kardon audio system a TeleAid telecommunications service, and Bluetooth wireless data link for hands-free phone capabilities.

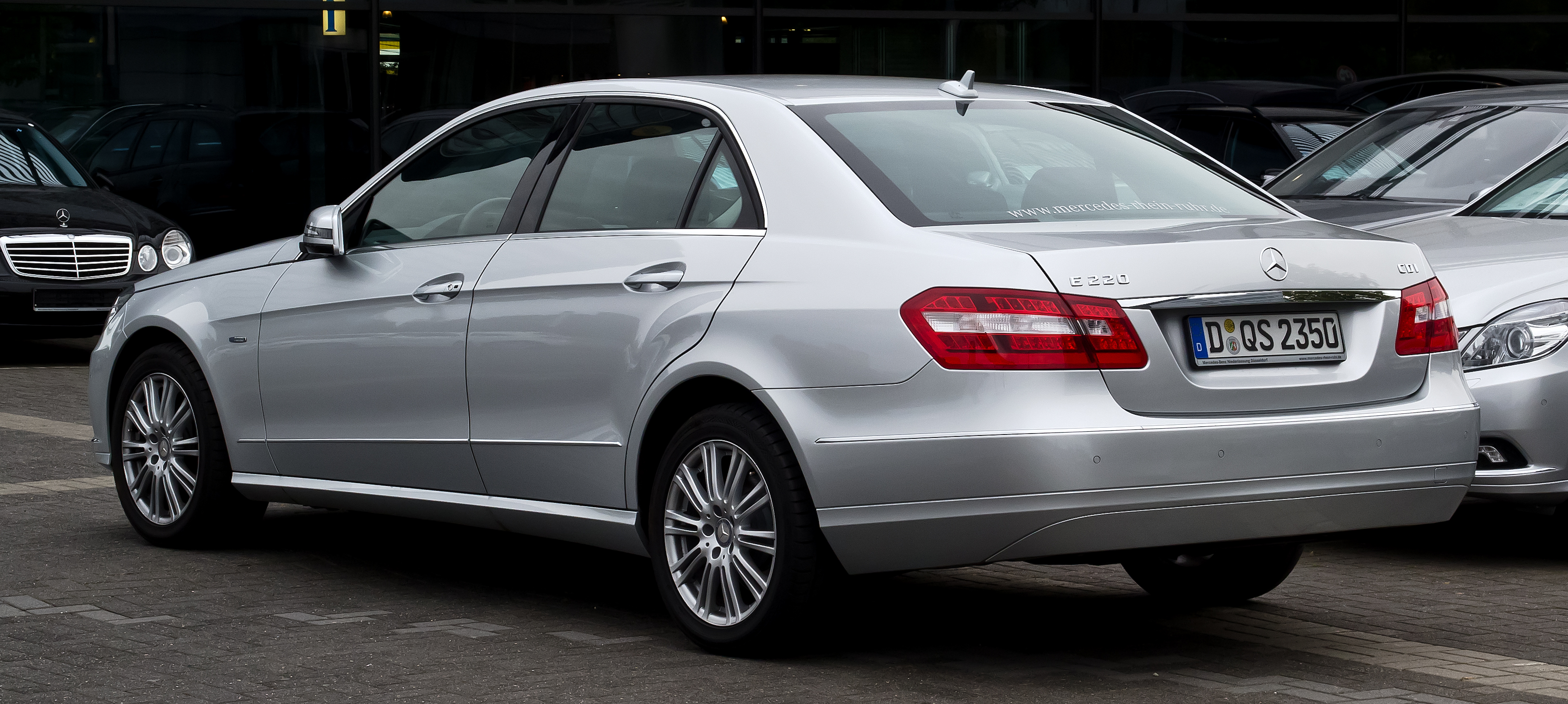
Sedan (W 212)

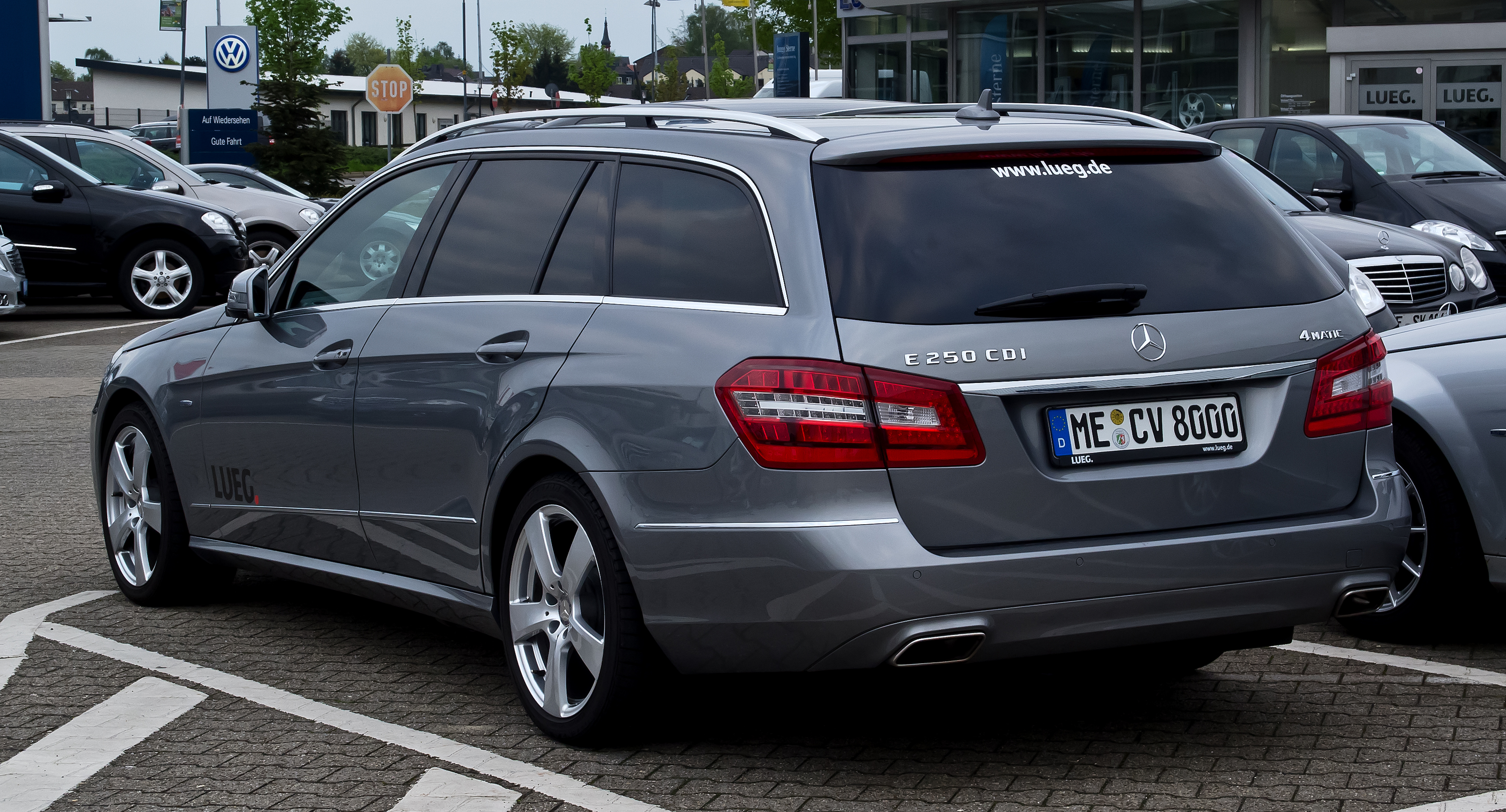
Estate (S 212)

== W212 facelift (2013–2016) ==
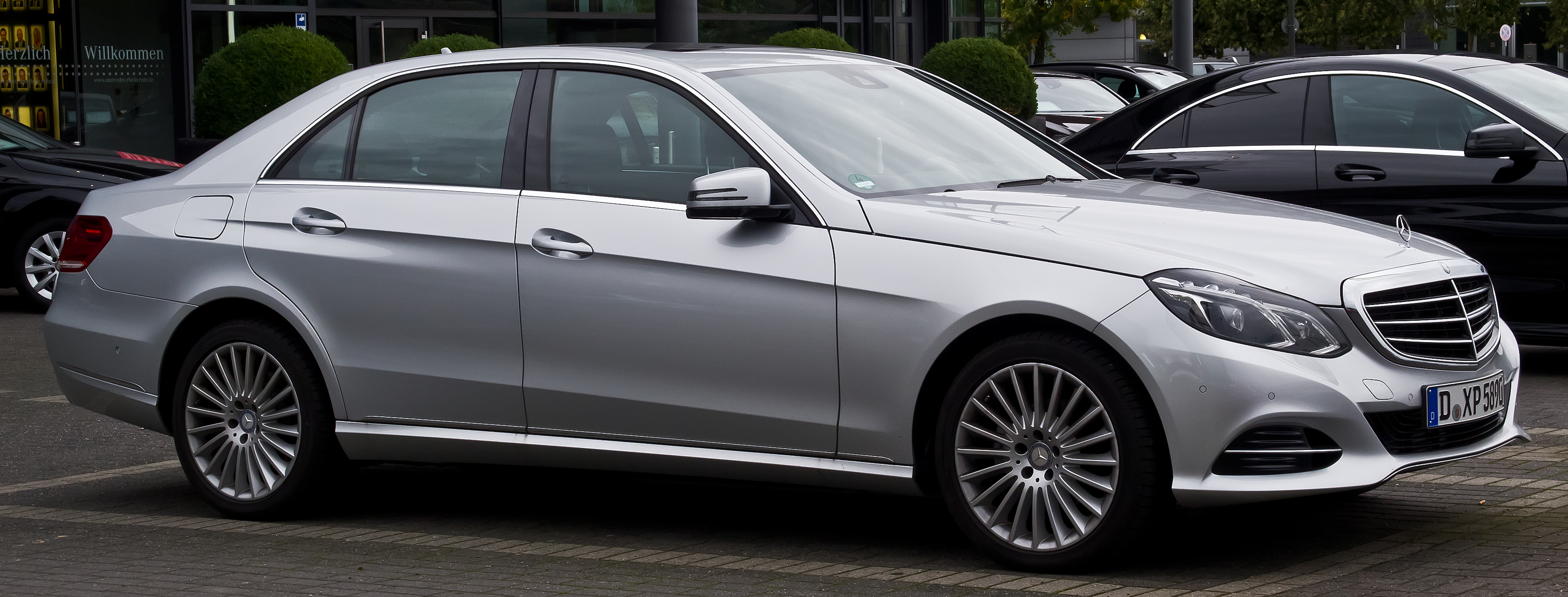

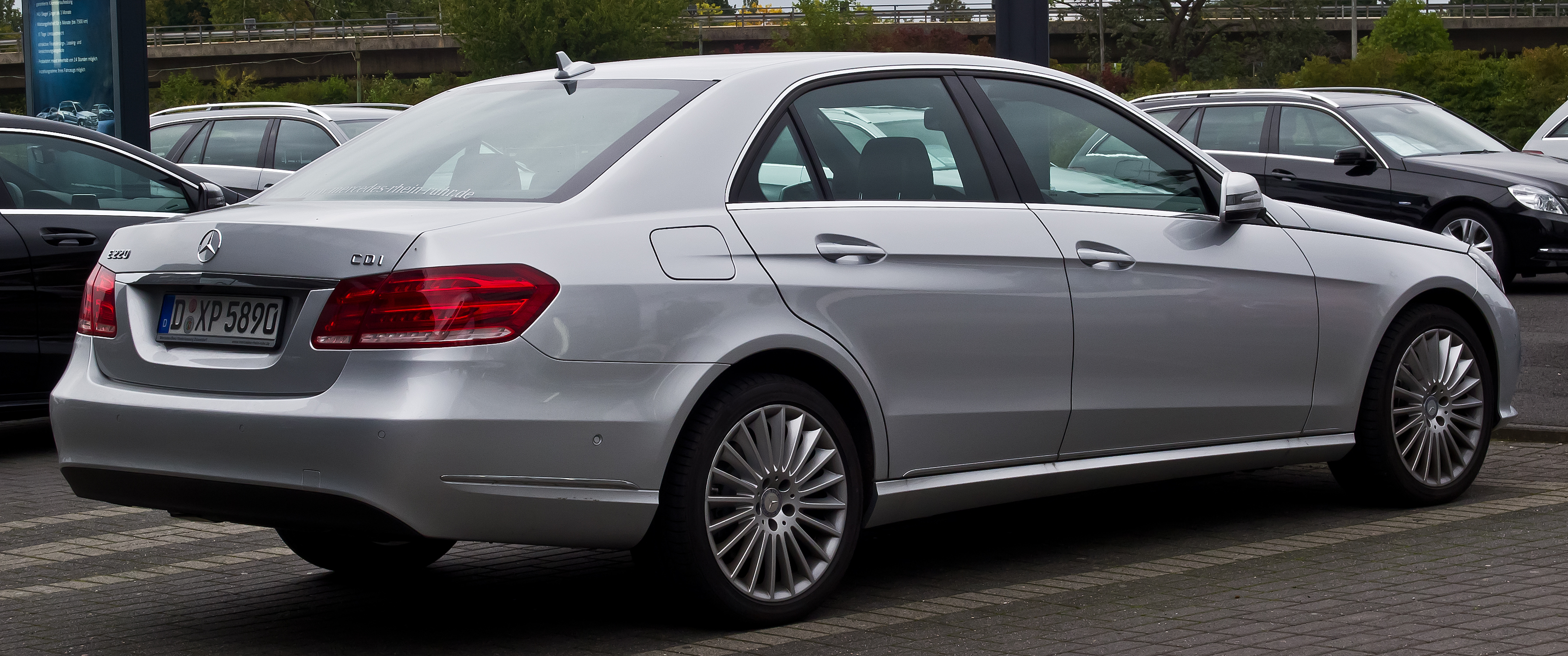
Mercedes-Benz E 220 CDI Elegance (W212, facelift)

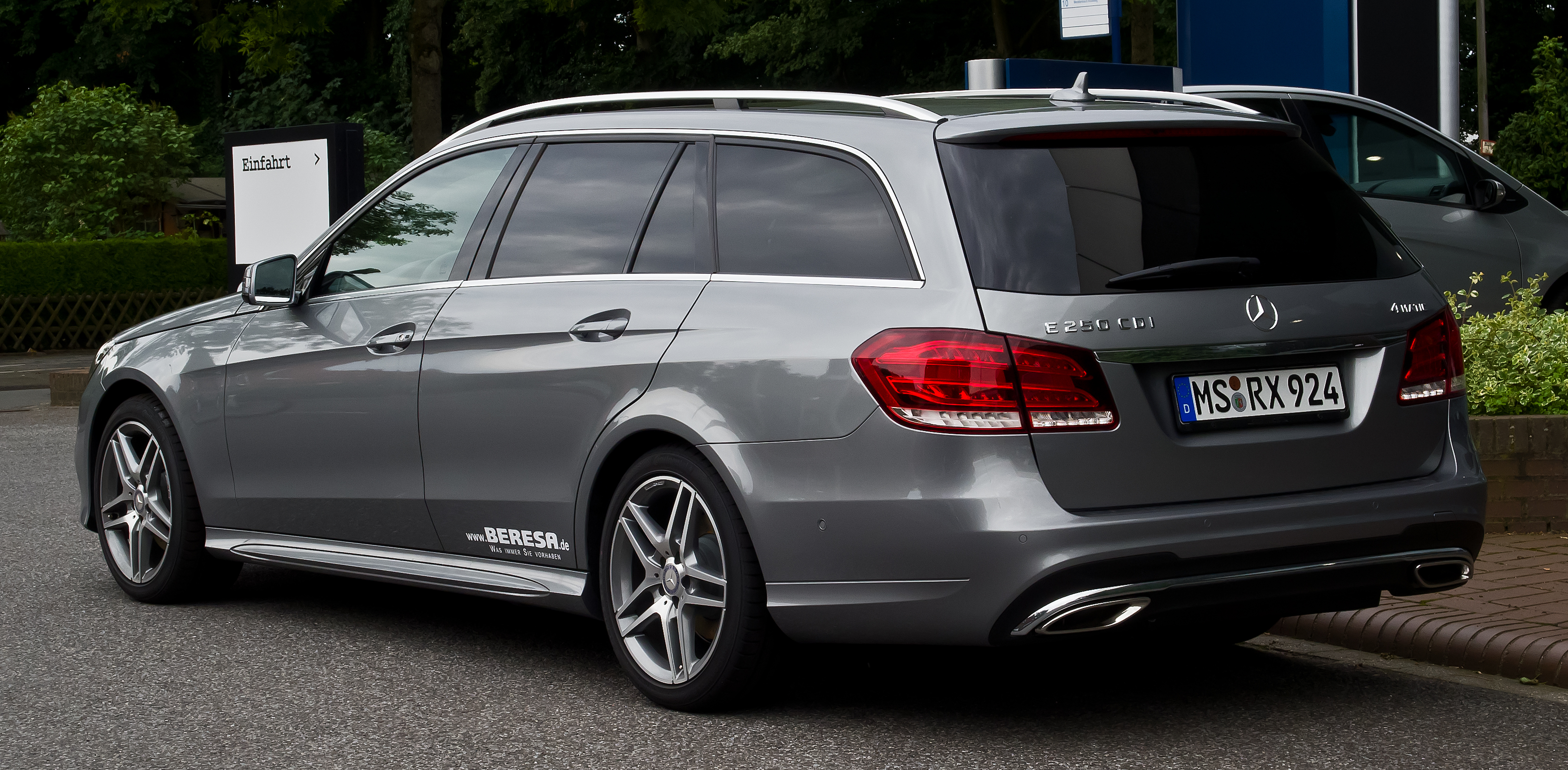
Mercedes-Benz E 250 CDI 4MATIC Avantgarde

=== Development and launch ===
The fourth generation E-Class (W212) facelift was unveiled to media in December 2012 ahead of its public debut at the 2013 North American International Auto Show, it was made available for sale in early/mid 2013 as the 2014 model year. Compared to typically subtle Mercedes-Benz minor model updates, the changes to the W212 were relatively extensive. With the sales the E-Class had lost to SUVs and crossovers in Europe and America more than compensated for by demand in emerging markets, it received the "most significant model revision" Mercedes-Benz had ever undertaken, reported close to €1 billion into the development of the mid-cycle refresh. The amount of new features on the facelifted model is about the same that's expected from the release of an entirely new model. The facelift brings significant styling changes, improved engines, more standard equipment and several extra hi-tech features.

Depending on the market, the 2014 E-Class is available in the following versions. The lineup starts with the E 200 that has a turbocharged 2.0-litre producing 181 hp (135 kW) or 208 hp (155 kW) in the E 250. The more frugal E 200 CDI has a four-cylinder, 2.1-litre turbodiesel unit with 134 hp (100 kW). The same engine powers the E 220 CDI where it's tuned to output 168 hp (125 kW), while in the E 250 CDI it churns 201 hp (150 kW). There are also BlueTec versions of the E 250, E 300 Hybrid and E 350. The regular E 350 gets a V6 3.5-litre engine generating 302 hp (225 kW), while the E 400 Hybrid has the same V6 engine but with an electric motor developing an additional 27 hp (20 kW). The E 550 makes use of a 4.7-litre turbo charged V8 engine developing 402 hp (300 kW).

=== Styling ===
The front was completely restyled, giving it a more aggressive look compared to the pre-facelift model in response to the newer BMW 5 Series and Audi A6. The twin headlamp design was replaced with a singular front light (marking the end of Mercedes's dual headlamps use), while the light elements within the headlamps helped to retain the "four-eyed" appearance. Low beam and daytime running lamps both came with partial LED as standard, while full LED technology was available as an option for the first time. The hood, with new flowing lines, and the front bumper, which was made sharper with bigger air intakes, were also completely redesigned.

In the rear, the LED taillights were given horizontal design, while Sport models featured exposed dual exhaust pipes. The doors and front fenders were re-shaped, eliminating the wheel arch bulge and replacing it with a more traditional character line in the sheet metal. The lower side crease line (which replaced the pre-facelift model's side chrome trim) extends from the rear door all the way to the front fender, hence all the side panels except for the rear quarter panel was also restyled.

The facelift could be ordered with two distinct design variants: Sport and Luxury, which featured two different front-end designs for each line. The Luxury version came with the classic saloon grille with 3-louver look and star on the hood. The Sport version featured the sports grille with integrated star, also a first time option, forming a visual link to the high performance sports car models. Sport models receive a more confident front design, using the AMG styling package that features larger air intakes and a distinct aluminum trim line along the entire lower rim of the front bumper.

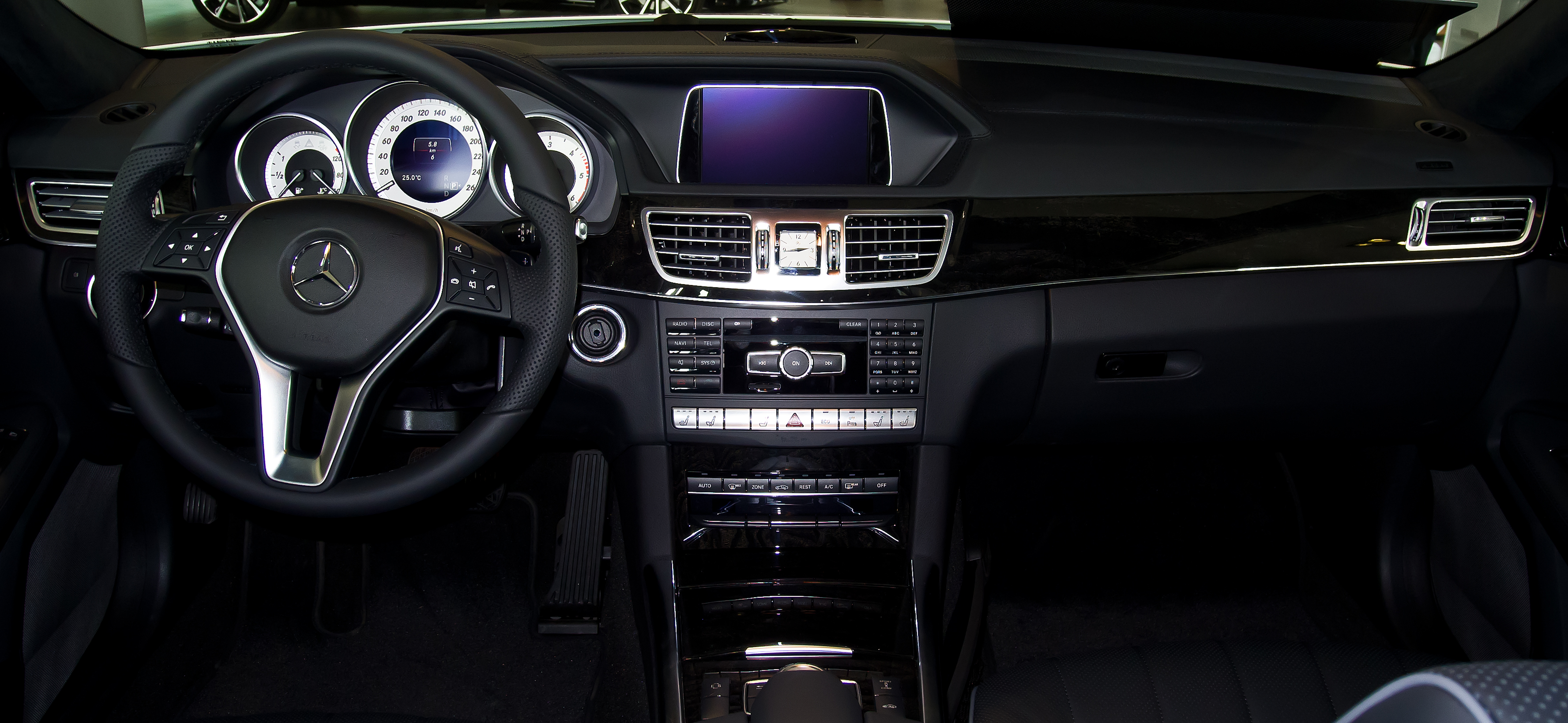
The interior of the mid-cycle refresh had been minimally restyled.

The car's interior cabin was subtly revised, with the new 3-tube instrument cluster, trapezoidal head-unit display, air vents design and a new analogue clock in the centre console between the two central vents, like the CLS-Class (C218). A new feature was the two-part trim which stretched across the entire dashboard, available in a wood or aluminium look, irrespective of the equipment line. There was also a redesigned centre console without a selector lever (saloons had already done away with the selector lever as part of the launch of the W212), as well as a new multi-function steering wheel with DIRECT SELECT lever and shift paddles in conjunction with the automatic transmission. If the driver had shifted up or down manually, after a set period of time the transmission would independently switch back to automatic mode to save fuel.

=== Equipment ===
Three different suspension configurations could be ordered. The comfort-biased setup used the base DIRECT CONTROL suspension with selective damping system. The sporty DIRECT CONTROL suspension with selective damping system was lowered by 15mm. The AIRMATIC air suspension featured electronically controlled damping. The Estate model received an air suspension with self-leveling as standard on the rear axle. All E-Classes were to be fitted with an electromechanical Direct-Steer system as standard.

For infotainment, the E-Class was equipped with the COMAND system featuring AM/FM/WB radio, indash DVD/CD player, in-dash memory card slot, and Bluetooth interface for hands-free calling. Standard equipment also included a central controller with a 7-inch, high-resolution display and a colour display in the instrument cluster. Optional features included: Rearview camera, COMAND navigation, SiriusXM satellite radio, Harman/Kardon Logic 7 surround sound, power rear window sunshade, heated front seats, active ventilated front seats and garage-door opener and KEYLESS-GO.

The E-Class benefited from new safety features derived from the 2014 S-Class, including the stereo multi-purpose camera which enabled the car to detect oncoming or crossing traffic, pedestrians and traffic signs up to 50 metres away.

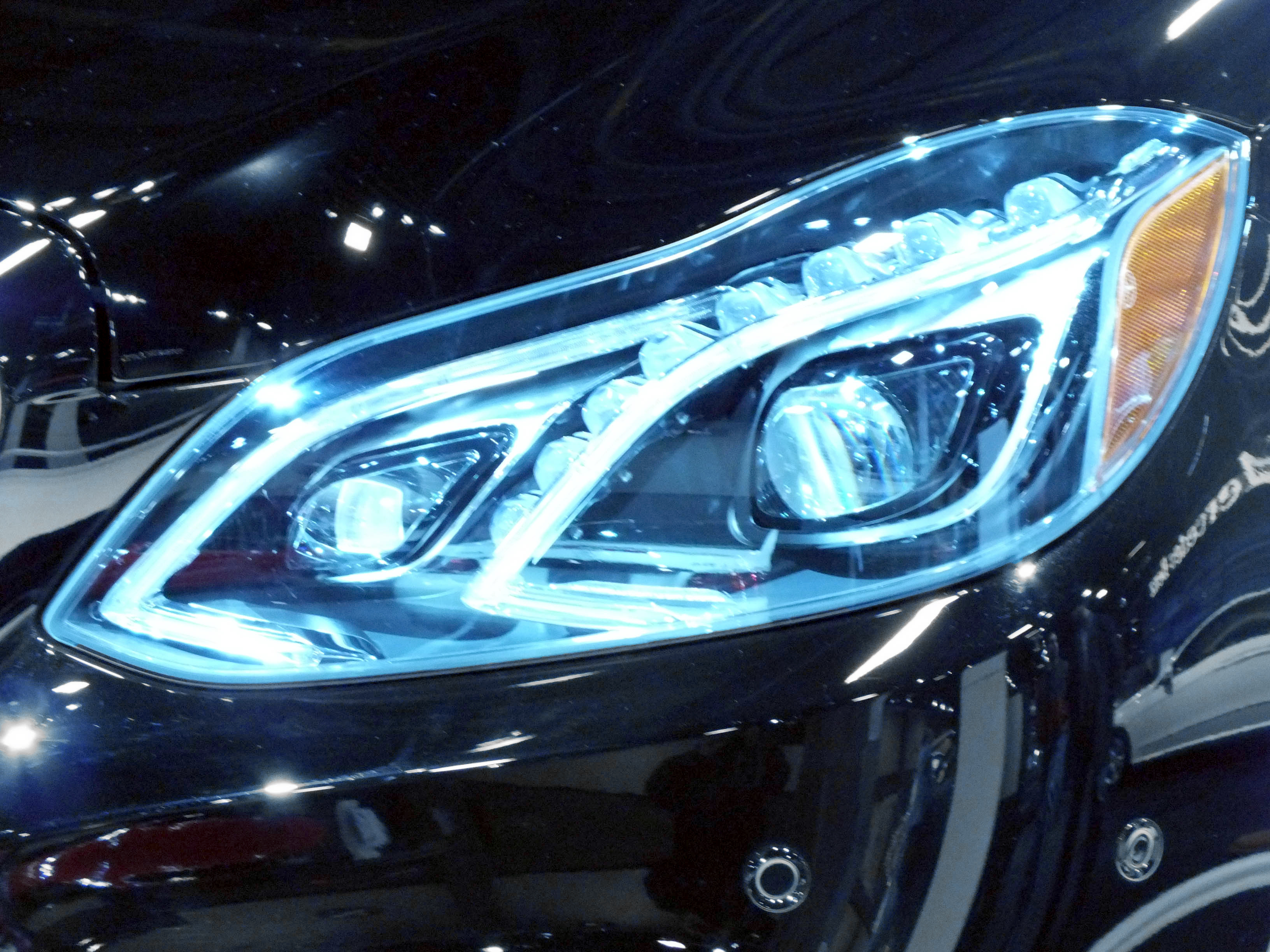
Full-LED headlamps with Intelligent Light System and Adaptive Highbeam Assist PLUS on the 2014 E-Class.

Mercedes' Intelligent Drive technology equipped the 2014 E-Class with up to eleven new or enhanced driving assistance features. Among these were Attention Assist (giving the driver greater control over sensitivity levels), standard Collision Prevention Assist, Distronic Plus adaptive cruise control with Steering Assist, Active Lane Keeping Assist, Brake Assist Plus, and Cross Traffic Assist.

The Intelligent Light System with Adaptive Highbeam Assist PLUS used radar and stereo cameras to detect oncoming cars and operated on high beam while blanking out a section of light around them. The same system also identified pedestrians and could flash light specifically on them.

Other optional safety technologies included PRE-SAFE Brake, PRE-SAFE PLUS, PRE-SAFE Impulse, Active Parking Assist, Active Blind Spot Assist, Traffic Sign Assist and a 360-degree camera.

== Specifications ==
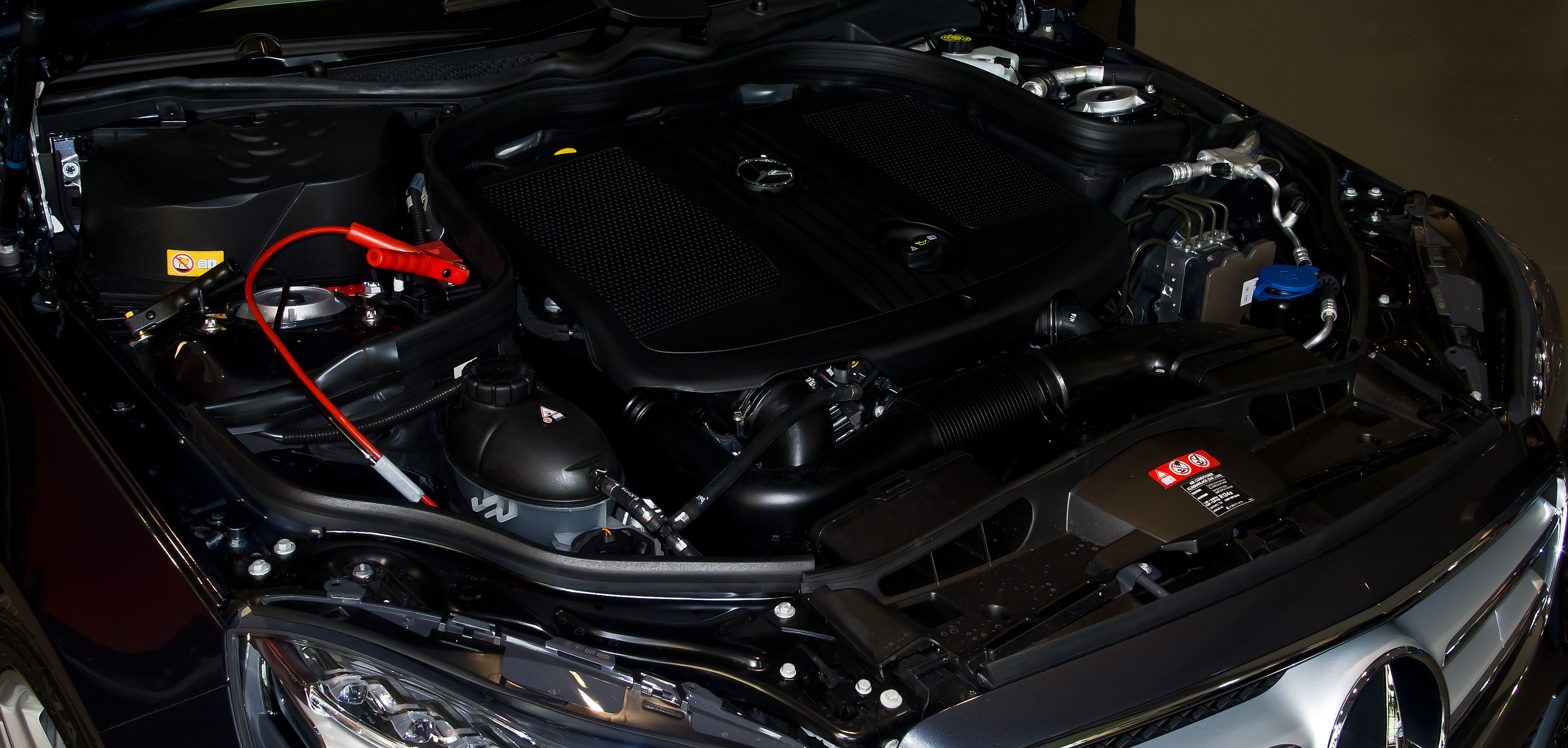
E 250 CDI (2013–2016) engine bay (OM651).

=== Engines ===
Model	Years	Engine	Power	Torque	0–100 km/h (0–62 mph) (saloon with automatic transmission)	Fuel Consumption/Efficiency (EU-Norm combined) (saloon with automatic transmission)
Petrol engines
E 200 BlueEFFICIENCY*	2009–2013	1,796 cc (1.796 L; 109.6 cu in) turbocharged I4 M271 DE18 LA	184 PS (135 kW; 181 hp)	270 N⋅m (199 lbf⋅ft)	8.5 s	6.5–6.9 L/100 km (36–34 mpg_{‑US})
E 200	2013–2016	1,991 cc (1.991 L; 121.5 cu in) turbocharged I4 M274 DE20 LA	184 PS (135 kW; 181 hp)	270 N⋅m (199 lbf⋅ft)	8.5 s	5.8–6.1 L/100 km (41–39 mpg_{‑US})
E 250 BlueEFFICIENCY*	2009–2013	1,796 cc (1.796 L; 109.6 cu in) turbocharged I4 M271 DE18 LA	204 PS (150 kW; 201 hp)	310 N⋅m (229 lbf⋅ft)	7.7 s	6.6–7.0 L/100 km (36–34 mpg_{‑US})
E 250	2013–2016	1,991 cc (1.991 L; 121.5 cu in) turbocharged I4 M274 DE20 LA	211 PS (155 kW; 208 hp)	350 N⋅m (258 lbf⋅ft)	7.1 s	5.8–6.1 L/100 km (41–39 mpg_{‑US})
E 300	2009–2011	2,996 cc (2.996 L; 182.8 cu in) V6 M272 KE30	231 PS (170 kW; 228 hp)	300 N⋅m (221 lbf⋅ft)	7.4 s	9.1–9.3 L/100 km (26–25 mpg_{‑US})
E 300	2011–2015	2,996 cc (2.996 L; 182.8 cu in) V6 M272 KE30	245 PS (180 kW; 242 hp)	300 N⋅m (221 lbf⋅ft)	7.4 s	9.1–9.3 L/100 km (26–25 mpg_{‑US})
E 300**	2011–2014	3,498 cc (3.498 L; 213.5 cu in) V6 M276 DE35 red.	252 PS (185 kW; 249 hp)	340 N⋅m (251 lbf⋅ft)	7.1 s	6.8–7.0 L/100 km (35–34 mpg_{‑US})
E 300 4MATIC**	2011–2014	3,498 cc (3.498 L; 213.5 cu in) V6 M276 DE35 red.	252 PS (185 kW; 249 hp)	340 N⋅m (251 lbf⋅ft)	7.4 s	7.4–7.5 L/100 km (32–31 mpg_{‑US})
E 350 CGI BlueEFFICIENCY	2009–2011	3,498 cc (3.498 L; 213.5 cu in) V6 M272 DE35	292 PS (215 kW; 288 hp)	365 N⋅m (269 lb⋅ft)	6.8 s	8.5–8.8 L/100 km (28–27 mpg_{‑US})
E 350	2009–2013	3,498 cc (3.498 L; 213.5 cu in) V6 M272 KE35	272 PS (200 kW; 268 hp)	350 N⋅m (258 lbf⋅ft)	6.5 s	9.3–9.7 L/100 km (25–24 mpg_{‑US})
E 350 4MATIC	2009–2011	3,498 cc (3.498 L; 213.5 cu in) V6 M272 KE35	272 PS (200 kW; 268 hp)	350 N⋅m (258 lbf⋅ft)	6.5 s	9.6–9.8 L/100 km (25–24 mpg_{‑US})
E 350**	2012–2014	3,498 cc (3.498 L; 213.5 cu in) V6 M276 DE35	306 PS (225 kW; 302 hp)	370 N⋅m (273 lbf⋅ft)	6.3 s	6.8–7.0 L/100 km (35–34 mpg_{‑US})
E 350 4MATIC**	2012–2014	3,498 cc (3.498 L; 213.5 cu in) V6 M276 DE35	306 PS (225 kW; 302 hp)	370 N⋅m (273 lbf⋅ft)	6.6 s	7.4–7.5 L/100 km (32–31 mpg_{‑US})
E 400 HYBRID	2012–2016	3,498 cc (3.498 L; 213.5 cu in) V6 M276 DE35 + el. motor	331 PS (243 kW; 326 hp)	620 N⋅m (457 lbf⋅ft)		
E 400	2013–2014	2,996 cc (2.996 L; 182.8 cu in) twin-turbo V6 M276 DE30AL	333 PS (245 kW; 328 hp)	480 N⋅m (354 lbf⋅ft)	5.3 s	7.5–7.9 L/100 km (31–30 mpg_{‑US})
E 400	2014–2016	3,498 cc (3.498 L; 213.5 cu in) twin-turbo V6 M276 DE35AL	333 PS (245 kW; 328 hp)	480 N⋅m (354 lbf⋅ft)	5.3 s	6.9–7.1 L/100 km (34–33 mpg_{‑US})
E 400 4MATIC	2013–2014	2,996 cc (2.996 L; 182.8 cu in) twin-turbo V6 M276 DE30AL	333 PS (245 kW; 328 hp)	480 N⋅m (354 lbf⋅ft)	5.3 s	8.1–8.5 L/100 km (29–28 mpg_{‑US})
E 400 4MATIC	2014–2016	3,498 cc (3.498 L; 213.5 cu in) twin-turbo V6 M276 DE35AL	333 PS (245 kW; 328 hp)	480 N⋅m (354 lbf⋅ft)	5.3 s	7.4–7.7 L/100 km (32–31 mpg_{‑US})
E 500	2009–2011	5,461 cc (5.461 L; 333.3 cu in) V8 M273 KE55	388 PS (285 kW; 383 hp)	530 N⋅m (391 lbf⋅ft) at 2,800–4,800	5.2 s	10.8–11.2 L/100 km (21.8–21.0 mpg_{‑US})
E 500 4MATIC	2009–2011	5,461 cc (5.461 L; 333.3 cu in) V8 M273 KE55	388 PS (285 kW; 383 hp)	530 N⋅m (391 lbf⋅ft) at 2,800–4,800	5.4 s	10.0–11.3 L/100 km (23.5–20.8 mpg_{‑US})
E 500**	2011–2016	4,663 cc (4.663 L; 284.6 cu in) twin-turbo V8 M278 DE46 LA red.	408 PS (300 kW; 402 hp)	600 N⋅m (443 lbf⋅ft)	4.9 s	8.9 L/100 km (26 mpg_{‑US})
E 500 4MATIC**	2011–2016	4,663 cc (4.663 L; 284.6 cu in) twin-turbo V8 M278 DE46 LA red.	408 PS (300 kW; 402 hp)	600 N⋅m (443 lbf⋅ft)	4.8 s	9.4 L/100 km (25 mpg_{‑US})
E 63 AMG	2009–2011	6,208 cc (6.208 L; 378.8 cu in) M156 V8 M156 E 63	525 PS (386 kW; 518 hp)	630 N⋅m (465 lbf⋅ft)	4.5 s	12.6 L/100 km (18.7 mpg_{‑US})
E 63 AMG	2011–2013	5,461 cc (5.461 L; 333.3 cu in) M157 twin-turbo V8 M157 DE55 LA	525 PS (386 kW; 518 hp)	700 N⋅m (516 lbf⋅ft)	4.3 s	9.8 L/100 km (24.001 mpg_{‑US})
E 63 AMG Performance Pack	2011–2013	5,461 cc (5.461 L; 333.3 cu in) M157 twin-turbo V8 M157 DE55 LA	557 PS (410 kW; 549 hp)	720 N⋅m (531 lbf⋅ft)	4.2 s	9.8 L/100 km (24.001 mpg_{‑US})
E 63 AMG (also has a version with 4MATIC)	2013-2016	5,461 cc (5.461 L; 333.3 cu in) M157 twin-turbo V8 M157 DE55 LA	557 PS (410 kW; 549 hp)	720 N⋅m (531 lbf⋅ft)	4.3 s	9.7 L/100 km (24.249 mpg_{‑US})
E 63 AMG S 4MATIC	2013–2016	5,461 cc (5.461 L; 333.3 cu in) M157 twin-turbo V8 M157 DE55 LA	585 PS (430 kW; 577 hp)	800 N⋅m (590 lbf⋅ft)	3.6 s	10.3 L/100 km (22.836 mpg_{‑US})
Diesel engines
E 200 CDI**	2010–2014	2,143 cc (2.143 L; 130.8 cu in) I4 OM651 DE22 LA red.	136 PS (100 kW; 134 hp)	360 N⋅m (266 lbf⋅ft) at 1,600–2,600	9.5 s	4.9 L/100 km (48 mpg_{‑US})
E 200 BlueTEC	2014–2016	2,143 cc (2.143 L; 130.8 cu in) I4 OM651 DE22 LA red.	136 PS (100 kW; 134 hp)	360 N⋅m (266 lbf⋅ft) at 1,600–2,600	9.5 s	4.6–4.9 L/100 km (51–48 mpg_{‑US})
E 220 CDI**	2009–2014	2,143 cc (2.143 L; 130.8 cu in) I4 OM651 DE22 LA	170 PS (125 kW; 168 hp)	400 N⋅m (295 lbf⋅ft)	8.4 s	4.7 L/100 km (50 mpg_{‑US})
E 220 BlueTEC	2014–2016	2,143 cc (2.143 L; 130.8 cu in) I4 OM651 DE22 LA	170 PS (125 kW; 168 hp)	400 N⋅m (295 lbf⋅ft)	8.2 s	4.5–4.7 L/100 km (52–50 mpg_{‑US})
E 220 CDI Edition**	2012–2013	2,143 cc (2.143 L; 130.8 cu in) I4 OM651 DE22 LA	170 PS (125 kW; 168 hp)	400 N⋅m (295 lbf⋅ft)	8.7 s (manual transmission)	4.5 L/100 km (52 mpg_{‑US})
E 220 BlueTEC BlueEFFICIENCY Edition	2013–2014	2,143 cc (2.143 L; 130.8 cu in) I4 OM651 DE22 LA	170 PS (125 kW; 168 hp)	400 N⋅m (295 lbf⋅ft)	8.4 s	4.4–4.6 L/100 km (53–51 mpg_{‑US})
E 220 BlueTEC BlueEFFICIENCY Edition	2014–2016	2,143 cc (2.143 L; 130.8 cu in) I4 OM651 DE22 LA	170 PS (125 kW; 168 hp)	400 N⋅m (295 lbf⋅ft)	8.6 s (manual transmission)	4.4–4.9 L/100 km (53–48 mpg_{‑US}) (manual transmission)
E 220 BlueTEC 4MATIC	2015–2016	2,143 cc (2.143 L; 130.8 cu in) I4 OM651 DE22 LA	170 PS (125 kW; 168 hp)	400 N⋅m (295 lbf⋅ft)	8,5 s	4.4–6.3 L/100 km (53–37 mpg_{‑US})
E 250 CDI**	2009–2014	2,143 cc (2.143 L; 130.8 cu in) I4 OM651 DE22 LA	204 PS (150 kW; 201 hp)	500 N⋅m (369 lbf⋅ft)	7.5 s	4.7 L/100 km (50 mpg_{‑US})
E 250 BlueTEC	2014–2016	2,143 cc (2.143 L; 130.8 cu in) I4 OM651 DE22 LA	204 PS (150 kW; 201 hp)	500 N⋅m (369 lbf⋅ft)	7.4 s	4.5–4.7 L/100 km (52–50 mpg_{‑US})
E 250 CDI 4MATIC**	2011–2014	2,143 cc (2.143 L; 130.8 cu in) I4 OM651 DE22 LA	204 PS (150 kW; 201 hp)	500 N⋅m (369 lbf⋅ft)	7.9 s	5.5 L/100 km (43 mpg_{‑US})
E 250 BlueTEC 4MATIC	2013–2016	2,143 cc (2.143 L; 130.8 cu in) I4 OM651 DE22 LA	204 PS (150 kW; 201 hp)	500 N⋅m (369 lbf⋅ft)	7.8 s	5.1–5.3 L/100 km (46–44 mpg_{‑US})
E 300 BlueTEC HYBRID	2012–2016	2,143 cc (2.143 L; 130.8 cu in) I4 OM651 DE22 LA + electric motor	231 PS (170 kW; 228 hp)	500 + 250 N⋅m (369 + 184 lb⋅ft) at 1,600–1,800	7.5 s	3.8–4.1 L/100 km (62–57 mpg_{‑US})
E 300 CDI BlueEFFICIENCY	2010	2,987 cc (2.987 L; 182.3 cu in) V6 OM642 DE30 LA	204 PS (150 kW; 201 hp)	500 N⋅m (369 lbf⋅ft) at 1,600–2,400	7.9 s	7.1 L/100 km (33 mpg_{‑US})
E 300 CDI BlueEFFICIENCY	2010–2011	2,987 cc (2.987 L; 182.3 cu in) V6 OM642 DE30 LA	231 PS (170 kW; 228 hp)	540 N⋅m (398 lbf⋅ft)	6.8 s	7.1 L/100 km (33 mpg_{‑US})
E 300 CDI BlueEFFICIENCY	2011–2013	2,987 cc (2.987 L; 182.3 cu in) V6 OM642 LS DE30 LA	231 PS (170 kW; 228 hp)	540 N⋅m (398 lbf⋅ft)	6.8 s	6.1 L/100 km (39 mpg_{‑US})
E 300 BlueTEC	2013–2016	2,987 cc (2.987 L; 182.3 cu in) V6 OM642 LS DE30 LA	231 PS (170 kW; 228 hp)	540 N⋅m (398 lbf⋅ft)	7.1 s	5.3 L/100 km (44 mpg_{‑US})
E 350 CDI BlueEFFICIENCY	2009–2010	2,987 cc (2.987 L; 182.3 cu in) V6 OM642 DE30 LA	231 PS (170 kW; 228 hp)	540 N⋅m (398 lbf⋅ft)	6.8 s	7.1 L/100 km (33 mpg_{‑US})
E 350 CDI 4MATIC BlueEFFICIENCY	2009–2010	2,987 cc (2.987 L; 182.3 cu in) V6 OM642 DE30 LA	231 PS (170 kW; 228 hp)	540 N⋅m (398 lbf⋅ft)	7.1 s	7.2 L/100 km (33 mpg_{‑US})
E 350 CDI BlueEFFICIENCY	2010–2013	2,987 cc (2.987 L; 182.3 cu in) V6 OM642 LS DE30 LA	265 PS (195 kW; 261 hp)	620 N⋅m (457 lbf⋅ft)	6.2 s	6.1 L/100 km (39 mpg_{‑US})
E 350 CDI 4MATIC BlueEFFICIENCY	2010–2013	2,987 cc (2.987 L; 182.3 cu in) V6 OM642 LS DE30 LA	265 PS (195 kW; 261 hp)	620 N⋅m (457 lbf⋅ft)	6.7 s	6.7 L/100 km (35 mpg_{‑US})
E 350 BlueTEC	2009–2013	2,987 cc (2.987 L; 182.3 cu in) V6 OM642 DE30 LA	211 PS (155 kW; 208 hp)	540 N⋅m (398 lbf⋅ft)	7.8 s	7.2 L/100 km (33 mpg_{‑US})
E 350 BlueTEC	2013–2014	2,987 cc (2.987 L; 182.3 cu in) V6 OM642 LS DE30 LA	252 PS (185 kW; 249 hp)	620 N⋅m (457 lbf⋅ft)	6.6 s	5.4 L/100 km (44 mpg_{‑US})
E 350 BlueTEC 4MATIC	2013–2014	2,987 cc (2.987 L; 182.3 cu in) V6 OM642 LS DE30 LA	252 PS (185 kW; 249 hp)	620 N⋅m (457 lbf⋅ft)	6.7 s	6.4 L/100 km (37 mpg_{‑US})
E 350 BlueTEC	2014–2016	2,987 cc (2.987 L; 182.3 cu in) V6 OM642 LS DE30 LA	258 PS (190 kW; 254 hp)	620 N⋅m (457 lbf⋅ft)	6.4 s	5.3 L/100 km (44 mpg_{‑US})
E 350 BlueTEC 4MATIC	2014–2016	2,987 cc (2.987 L; 182.3 cu in) V6 OM642 LS DE30 LA	258 PS (190 kW; 254 hp)	620 N⋅m (457 lbf⋅ft)	6.6 s	6.0 L/100 km (39 mpg_{‑US})

- E 500 is sold as the E 550 in the US and Canada.
- Badged as E 200 CGI BlueEFFICIENCY and E 250 CGI BlueEFFICIENCY before 2011.
- Badged as E 300 BlueEFFICIENCY, E 300 4MATIC BlueEFFICIENCY, E 350 BlueEFFICIENCY, E 350 4MATIC BlueEFFICIENCY, E 500 BlueEFFICIENCY, E 500 4MATIC BlueEFFICIENCY, E 200 CDI BlueEFFICIENCY, E 220 CDI BlueEFFICIENCY, E 220 CDI BlueEFFICIENCY Edition, E 250 CDI BlueEFFICIENCY and E 250 CDI 4MATIC BlueEFFICIENCY before 2013.
- The designation "BlueTEC" replaced the "CDI" from 2013 to 2017, as Euro 6 emissions standard effectively mandates SCR and AdBlue injection.
- E 180 models were sold in Turkey and Greece and Tunisia with a 1.6L 156HP 250NM derived from the M270 petrol engine.

=== Transmission ===
Model	Years	Standard	Optional
E 200 CGI BlueEFFICIENCY	2009–2011	6-speed manual	5G-TRONIC
E 200 BlueEFFICIENCY	2011–2013	6-speed manual	7G-TRONIC Plus
E 200	2013–2016	6-speed manual	7G-TRONIC Plus
E 250 CGI BlueEFFICIENCY	2009–2011	5G-TRONIC	
E 250 BlueEFFICIENCY	2011–2013	7G-TRONIC Plus	
E 250	2013–2016	7G-TRONIC Plus	
E 300	2009–2013	7G-TRONIC	
E 300 BlueEFFICIENCY	2011–2013	7G-TRONIC Plus	
E 300 4MATIC BlueEFFICIENCY	2011–2013	7G-TRONIC Plus	
E 300	2013–2014	7G-TRONIC Plus	
E 300 4MATIC	2013–2014	7G-TRONIC Plus	
E 350 CGI BlueEFFICIENCY	2009–2011	7G-TRONIC	
E 350	2009–2011	7G-TRONIC	
E 350 4MATIC	2009–2011	7G-TRONIC	
E 350 BlueEFFICIENCY	2011–2014	7G-TRONIC Plus	
E 350 4MATIC BlueEFFICIENCY	2011–2014	7G-TRONIC Plus	
E 350	2013–2014	7G-TRONIC Plus	
E 350 4MATIC	2013–2014	7G-TRONIC Plus	
E 400	2013–2016	7G-TRONIC Plus	
E 400 4MATIC	2013–2016	7G-TRONIC Plus	
E 500	2009–2011	7G-TRONIC	
E 500 4MATIC	2009–2011	7G-TRONIC	
E 500 BlueEFFICIENCY	2011–2013	7G-TRONIC Plus	
E 500 4MATIC BlueEFFICIENCY	2011–2013	7G-TRONIC Plus	
E 500	2013–2016	7G-TRONIC Plus	
E 500 4MATIC	2013–2016	7G-TRONIC Plus	
E 63 AMG	2009–2016	SPEEDSHIFT MCT 7-speed	
Model	Years	Standard	Optional
E 200 CDI BlueEFFICIENCY	2010–2011	6-speed manual	5G-TRONIC
E 200 CDI	2011–2013	6-speed manual	7G-TRONIC Plus
E 200 BlueTEC	2013–2016	6-speed manual	7G-TRONIC Plus
E 220 CDI BlueEFFICIENCY	2009–2011	6-speed manual	5G-TRONIC
E 220 CDI	2011–2014	6-speed manual	7G-TRONIC Plus
E 220 CDI BlueEFFICIENCY Edition	2012–2013	6-speed manual	
E 220 CDI Edition	2013	6-speed manual	
E 220 BlueTEC BlueEFFICIENCY Edition	2013–2014	7G-TRONIC Plus	
E 220 BlueTEC BlueEFFICIENCY Edition	2014–2016	6-speed manual (saloon) 9G-TRONIC (estate)	
E 220 BlueTEC	2014–2016	6-speed manual	9G-TRONIC
E 220 BlueTEC 4MATIC	2015–2016	7G-TRONIC Plus	
E 250 CDI BlueEFFICIENCY	2009–2011	6-speed manual	5G-TRONIC
E 250 CDI	2013–2014	6-speed manual	7G-TRONIC Plus
E 250 CDI 4MATIC BlueEFFICIENCY	2011–2013	7G-TRONIC 7G-TRONIC Plus	
E 250 CDI 4MATIC	2013–2014	7G-TRONIC 7G-TRONIC Plus	
E 250 BlueTEC	2014–2016	7G-TRONIC Plus	9G-TRONIC
E 250 BlueTEC 4MATIC	2014–2016	7G-TRONIC Plus	
E 300 BlueTEC HYBRID	2012–2016	7G-TRONIC Plus	
E 300 CDI BlueEFFICIENCY	2010–2011	7G-TRONIC	
E 300 CDI BlueEFFICIENCY	2011–2013	7G-TRONIC Plus	
E 300 BlueTEC	2013–2016	7G-TRONIC Plus 9G-TRONIC	
E 350 CDI BlueEFFICIENCY	2009–2011	7G-TRONIC 7G-TRONIC Plus	
E 350 CDI 4MATIC BlueEFFICIENCY	2009–2011	7G-TRONIC 7G-TRONIC Plus	
E 350 BlueTEC	2009–2011	7G-TRONIC Plus	
E 350 BlueTEC	2013–2014	7G-TRONIC Plus 9G-TRONIC	
E 350 BlueTEC	2014–2016	9G-TRONIC	
E 350 BlueTEC 4MATIC	2013–2016	7G-TRONIC Plus	

== Safety ==
=== Euro NCAP ===
Euro NCAP test results* Mercedes Benz E 220 CDI 'Avantgarde', LHD (2010)
Test	Points	%
Overall:	5 /5 stars	
Adult occupant:	31	86%
Child occupant:	38	77%
Pedestrian:	21	59%
Safety assist:	6	86%

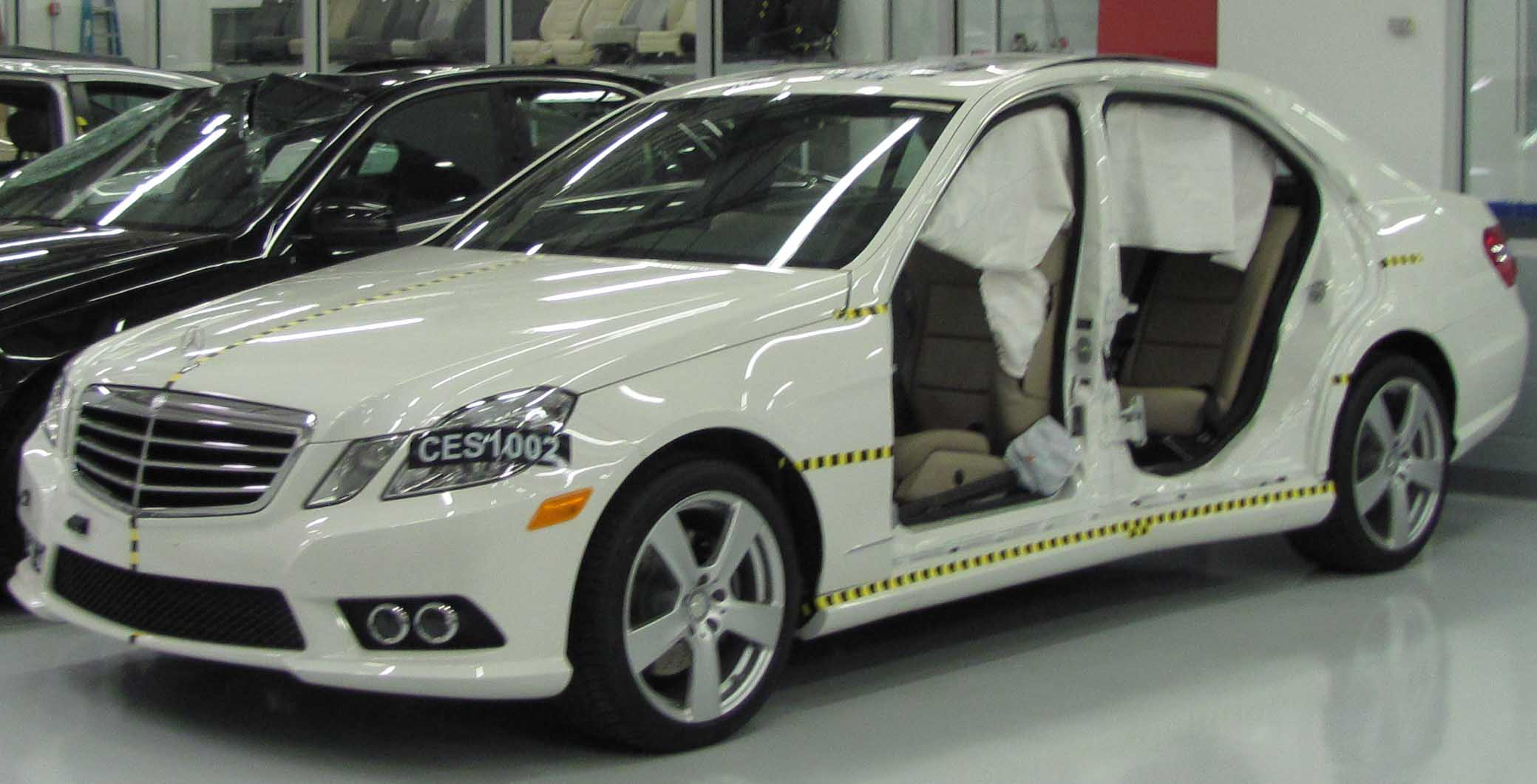
Crash-tested 2010 Mercedes-Benz E 350 done by Insurance Institute for Highway Safety.

The 2010 E-Class earned five stars out of five for occupant protection, pedestrian protection and assistance systems in the Euro NCAP test. It came standard with a number of safety systems like Collision Prevention Assist, Attention Assist, Adaptive braking technology, Daytime Running Lamps and Rain-sensing windshield wipers. The E-Class also received two "Euro NCAP Advanced" rewards for the optional PRE-SAFE and PRE-SAFE Brake safety system.

=== IIHS ===
The 2010 E-Class was the first E-Class to earn IIHS's reputable Top Safety Pick award. Insurance Institute for Highway Safety score the E-Class Good overall in the moderate overlap front crash test, but did not pass the small front overlap. It also received Good overall in side-impact collisions, the roof strength and seat/head restraint evaluations.

The redesigned 2014 E-Class received IIHS's Top Safety Pick+ award, which also passed the small front overlap crash test. Apart from the aforementioned test, the W212 facelift also scored the Good mark in the moderate overlap front, side, roof strength and seat/head restraint evaluations.

=== NHTSA ===
U.S. National Highway Traffic Safety Administration (NHTSA) crash testing of the 2014 US model year E-Class yielded a four-star driver and four-star passenger rating in the frontal-collision test (out of five stars). Side crash results were five out of five stars for both front and rear seats. The car scored five stars in rollover testing.

=== ANCAP ===
ANCAP test results* Mercedes-Benz E-Class (2009)
Test	Score
Overall	5 /5 stars
Frontal offset	13.88/16
Side impact	16/16
Pole	2/2
Seat belt reminders	3/3
Whiplash protection	Not Assessed
Pedestrian protection	Adequate
Electronic stability control	Standard

== Reception ==
The E-Class image suffered a downturn in the late 1990s and early 2000s. Things improved with the facelifted W211 but the introduction of the W212 series re-established the E-Class's original reputation for solid build quality and refined elegance. The W212 was also praised for having a differentiated design from the contemporary C-Class and S-Class models. Although the mid-cycle refresh was overwhelmingly praised, the design received mixed opinions as Mercedes decided to take a more streamlined direction with the redesign; replacing the twin headlamp design with a single lens design, which brought the E-Class design up to date with the ongoing F800 Style design language found on cars like the A-Class, B-Class, C-Class, S-Class, CLS-Class and M-Class.

== Special models ==
=== E 63 AMG (2010–2016) ===
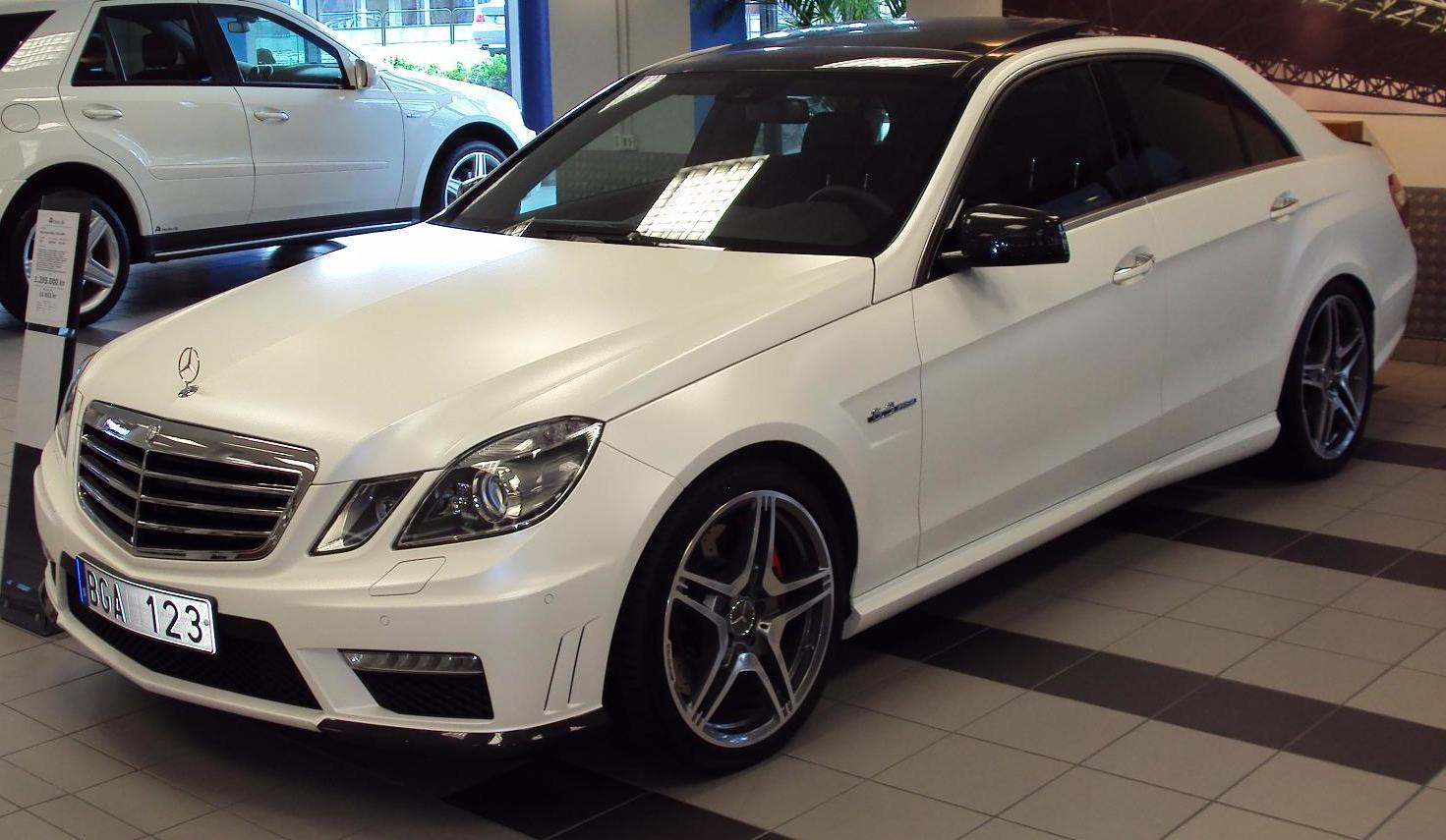

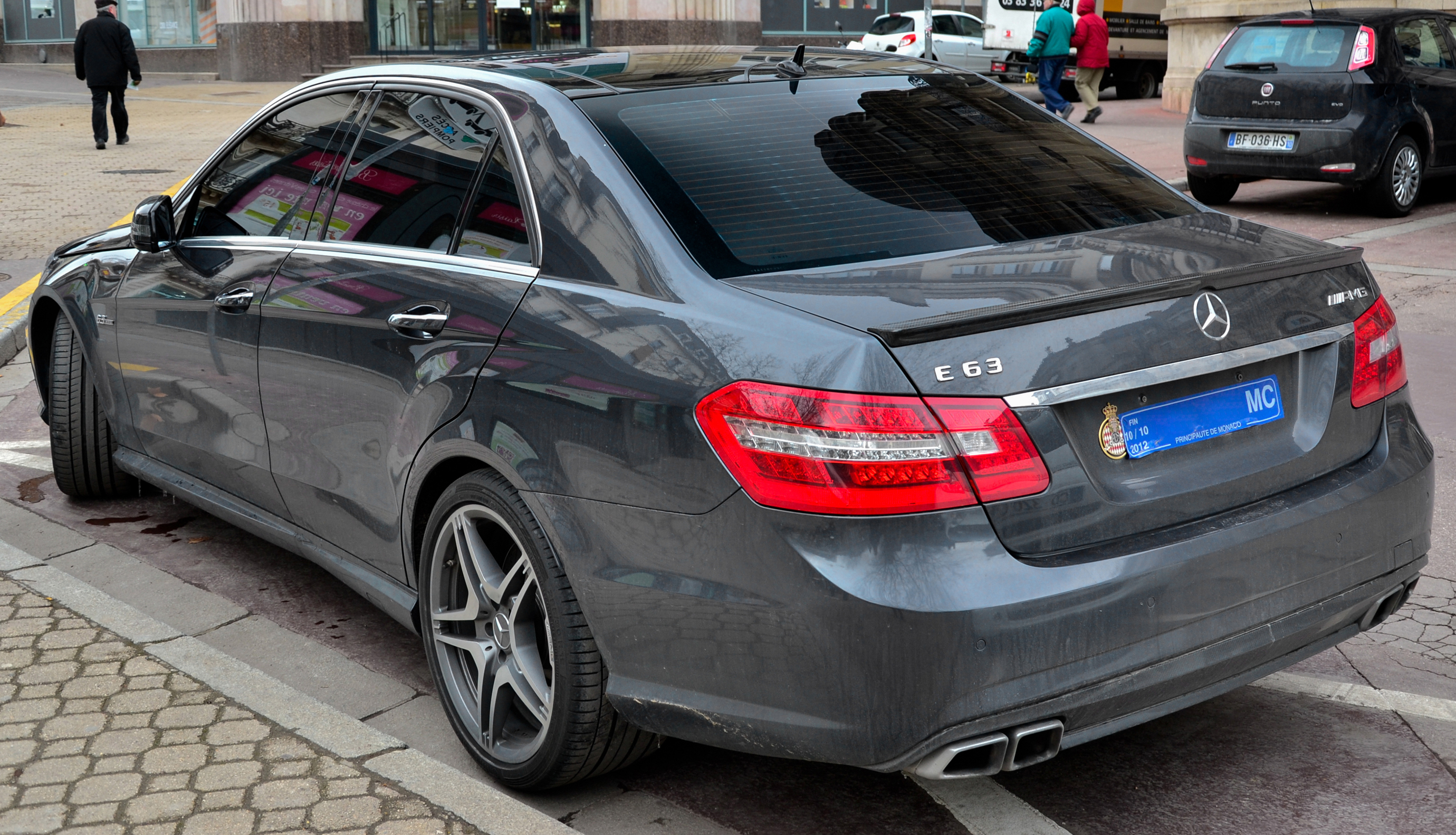
Pre-facelift E 63 AMG saloon (Europe)

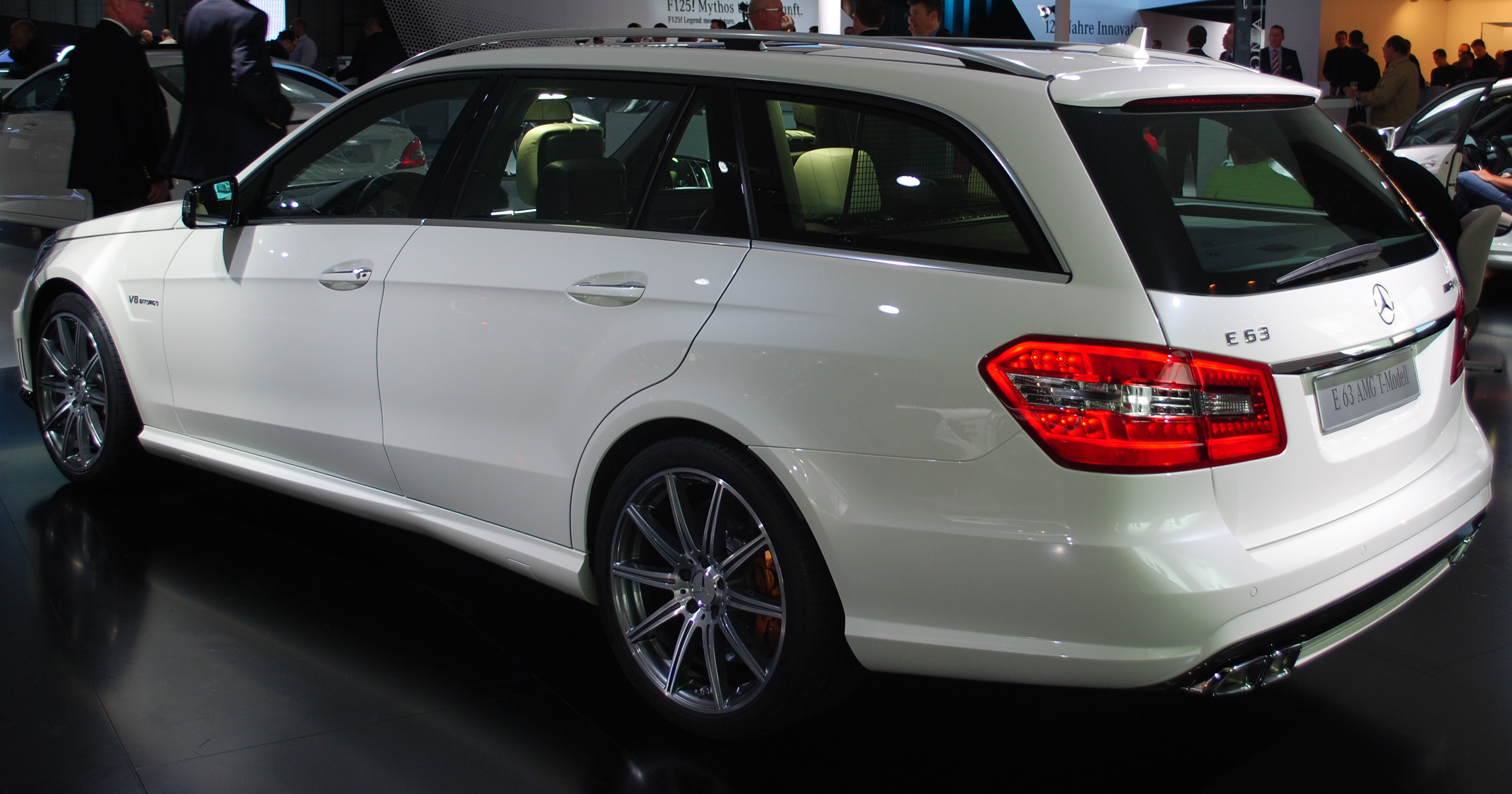
Pre-facelift E 63 AMG wagon (Europe)

The E 63 AMG saloon was unveiled at the 2009 New York International Auto Show. The new performance version of the E-Class is fitted with the same powertrain as the SL63 AMG, including AMG's 6.2-litre V8 and the SPEEDSHIFT MCT 7-speed sports automatic transmission with four driver-selectable modes including a fully manual mode. Similar to the C63 AMG, the new E 63 is more extensively modified than before, with a new, wider front axle, heavily revised suspension, and more distinct body panels.

The optional AMG Performance Pack includes lightweight, forged 19-inch AMG light-alloy wheels with 255/35R19 front and 285/30R19 rear tires, stiffer suspension, a limited-slip differential, a special three-spoke sport steering wheel, and a reprogramming of the electronic top speed limiter to 300 km/h (186 mph) from 250 km/h (155 mph). The 6.2 L V8 has 525 PS (386 kW; 518 hp) 465 lb⋅ft (630 N⋅m) and will accelerate from 0 to 100 km/h (62 mph) in approximately 4.5 seconds.

The styling has been altered for both aesthetic and practical purposes: AMG side skirts and rear apron give the E 63 more aggressive styling, and the larger air apertures on the front of the car allow for more air intake to the naturally aspirated 6.2 litre V8. Another styling change on the E 63 is the wider, flared front wheel arches which accommodate the AMG front axle with a 2.2-inch-wider (56 mm) track.

In 2011, the 6.2-litre V8 was replaced by a twin-turbo version of the 5.5-litre V8 available in the E 500/E 550; power remained the same as for the earlier, naturally aspirated 6.2-litre engine. With a 518 hp (386 kW) engine, the E 63 can achieve a top speed of around 200 mph (320 km/h) (electronic limiter off), and can accelerate from 0 to 60 mph (97 km/h) in 4.4 seconds. There was also a 557 PS (410 kW; 549 hp) Performance Pack version.

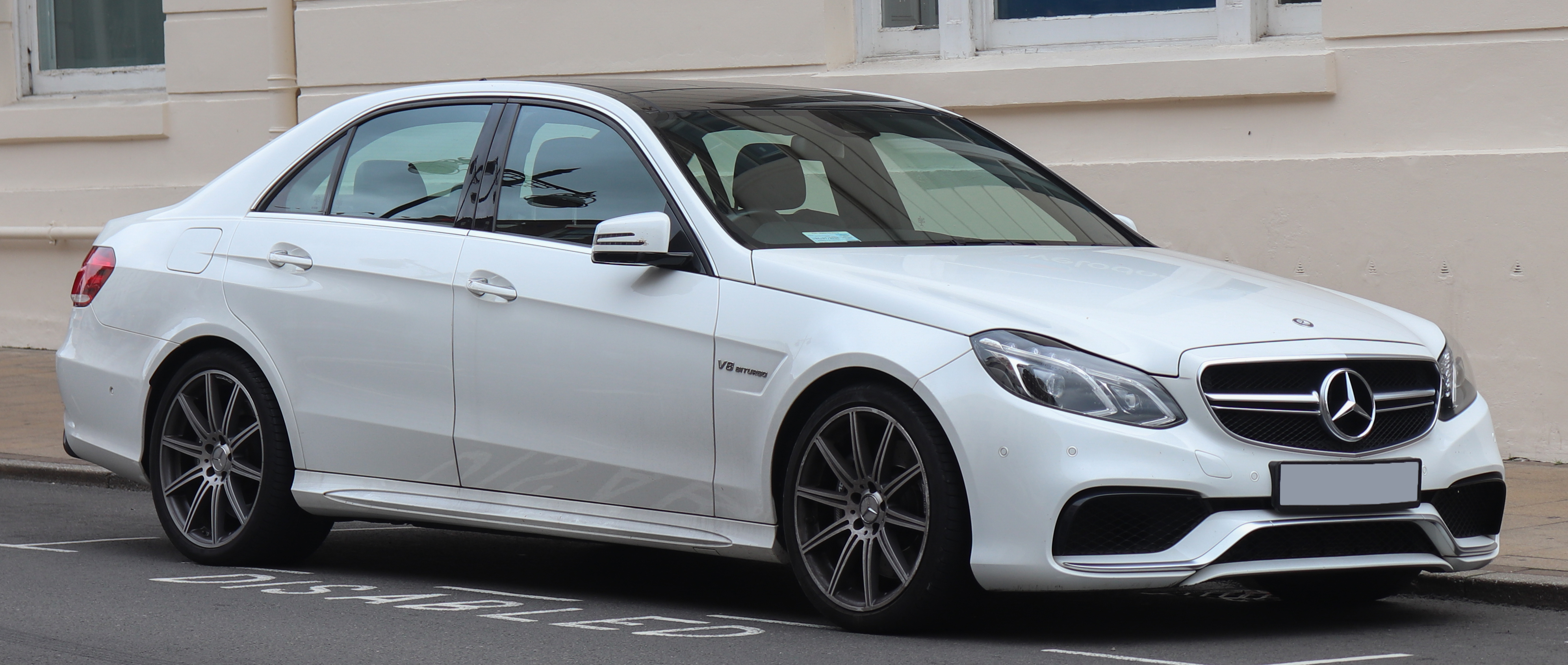

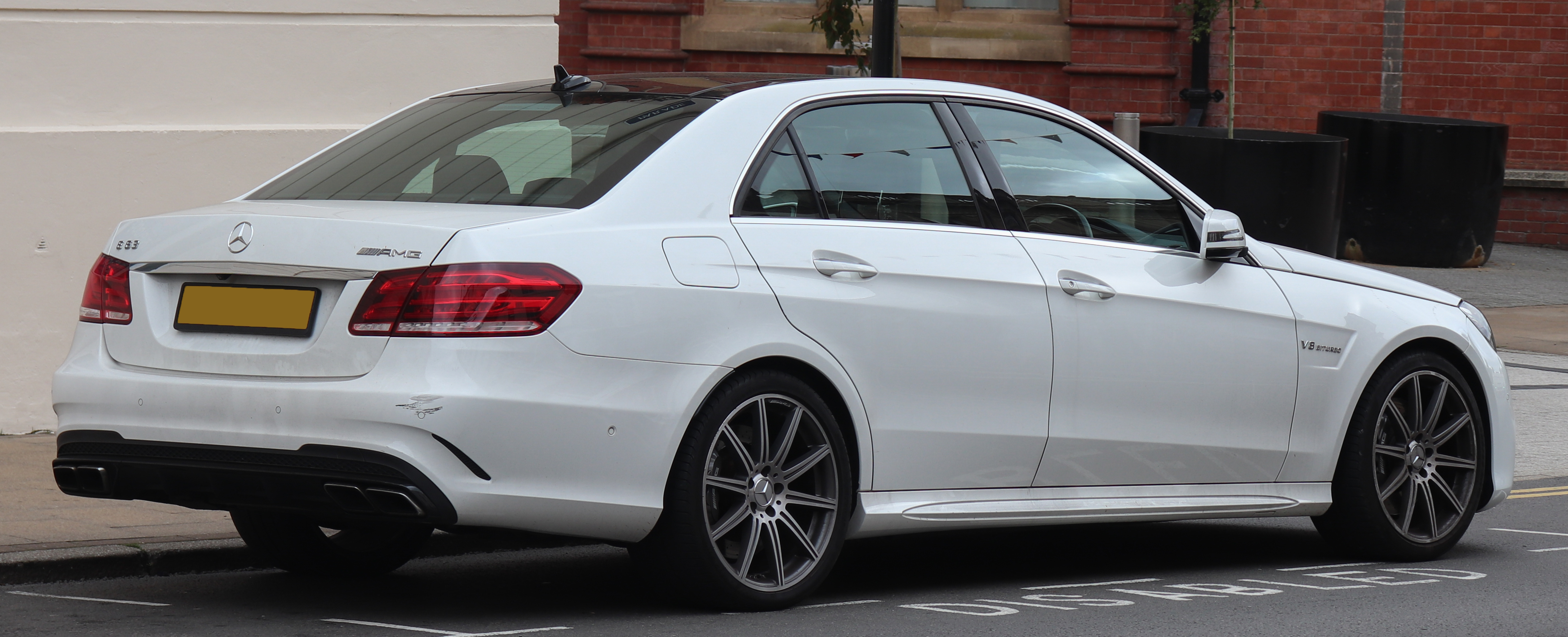
Facelifted E 63 AMG saloon (UK)

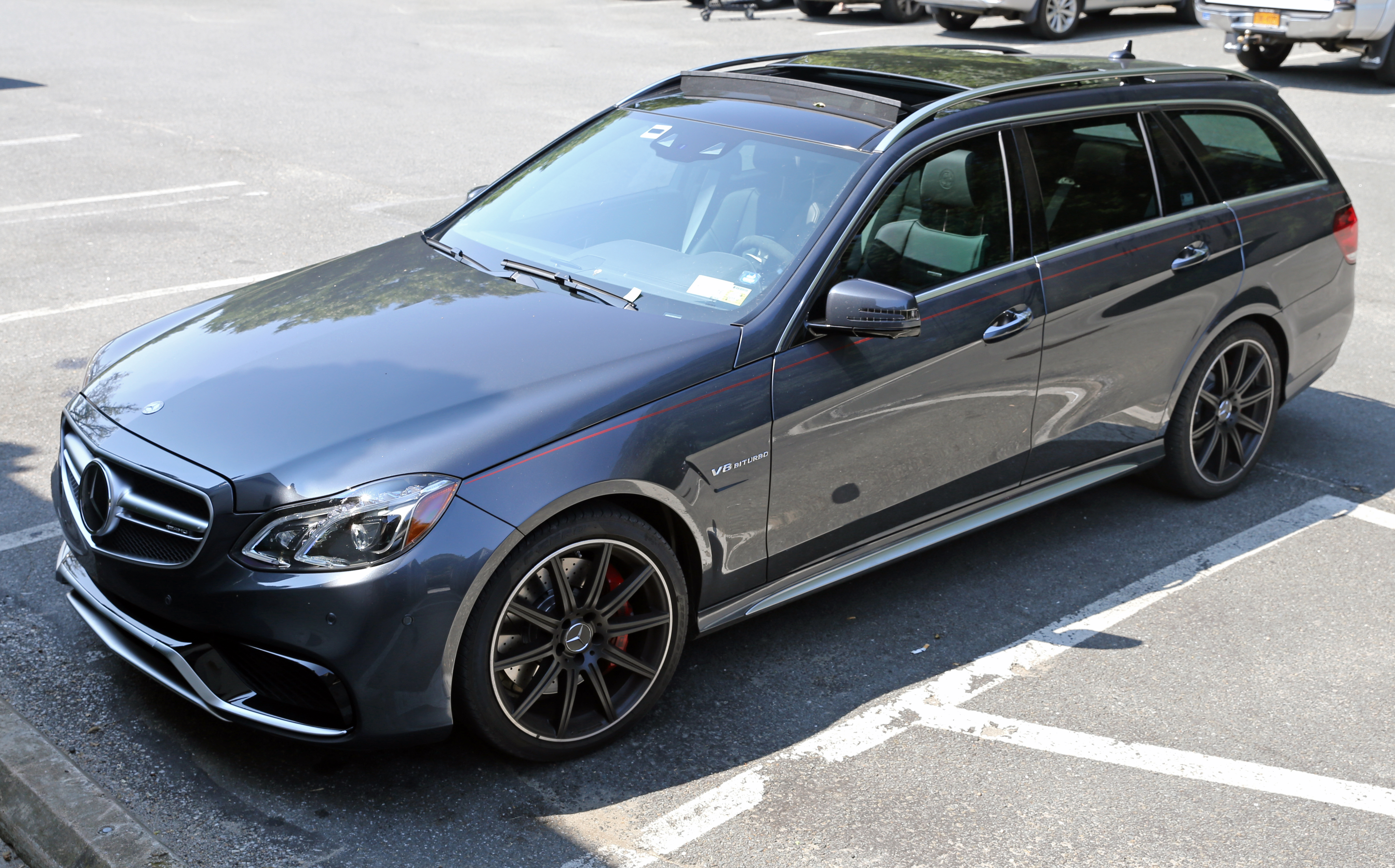
Facelifted E 63 AMG wagon (US)

In 2013, the facelifted E 63 AMG was launched almost immediately after the facelifted standard E-Class. It has a more sporty, singular front air intakes, sideskirts, rear diffuser and black detailings in the side mirrors, front grille, wheels, and rear apron. Also for the first time it can also be had in 4Matic four-wheel drive system. It has the same M157 5.5 L (5,461 cc) engine, with increased power of up to 550 bhp to last-generation's 525 bhp. Mercedes still offered an optional AMG "S" Performance Package, which adds 27 bhp in power for a total of 585 PS (577 bhp; 430 kW) at 5500 rpm and 800 N⋅m (590 lbf⋅ft) at 1750-5000 rpm and delimits the car's top speed to 186 mph (299 km/h). In the United States, the E 63 station wagon is only available as an AMG S, and all E 63s sold in North America now receive the 4Matic system as standard. Meanwhile, power of the "regular" E 63 AMG increased to the same level as the previous Performance Pack model. With the optional AMG "S" Performance Package, the car can do 0–60 mph (97 km/h) in 3.5 seconds; vehicles without the package take an additional 0.1 seconds. In October 2013, the AMG S model of the E 63 was introduced; this version has 585 PS (430 kW; 577 hp) and replaces the earlier Performance Pack model.

=== E-Guard ===
The E-Guard armoured version, which features VR4 (formerly B4) level protection, went on sale in April 2009. The vehicles are equipped with steel and aramid fibre (Kevlar) armour and bullet-resistant windows, as well as run-flat tyres rated for a top speed of 240 km/h (149 mph) (50 kilometres (31 mi) at 80 km/h (50 mph) when deflated), a special Level II version of the Airmatic air suspension system, emergency alarm system, intercom system, and underbody armour. As of 2011 it has an MSRP (in the Mexican market) of $1,954,900MXN Mexican Pesos, or approximately US$143,000 US Dollars.

=== E 250 BlueTEC concept (2009) ===
The E 250 BlueTEC is a concept vehicle based on the E 250 CDI BlueEFFICIENCY saloon, but with BlueTEC selective catalytic reduction and the 7G-Tronic Plus transmission. The vehicle was unveiled at the 2009 New York Auto Show. The E 250 BlueTEC is capable of 28 MPG city/39 MPG highway.

=== Edition 125 anniversary (2011) ===
A version commemorating Karl Benz inventing the first automobile powered by an internal combustion engine 125 years prior, for Hong Kong and Mexican markets. It is available for E 250, E 300 and E 350 models.

== Motorsport ==
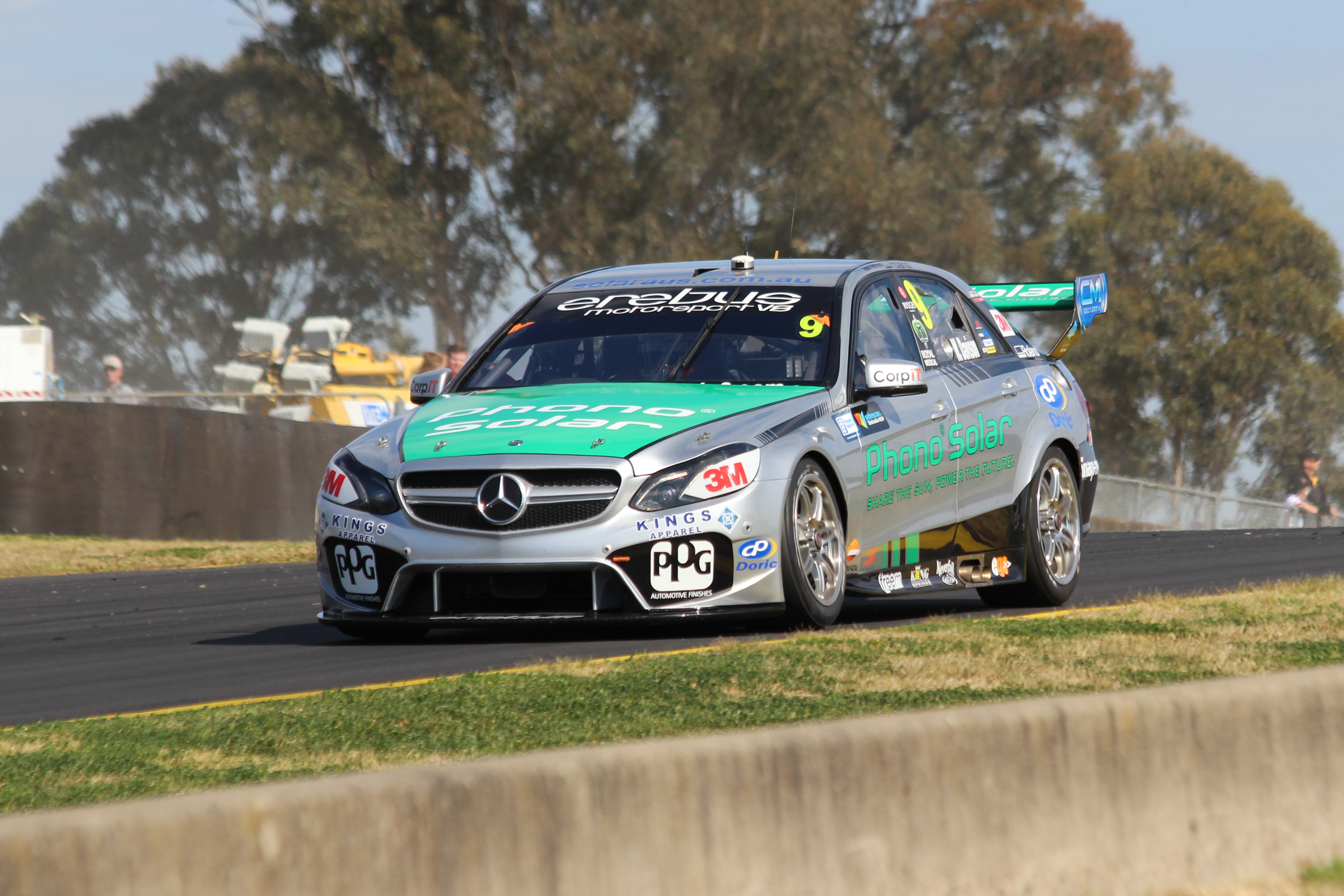
Erebus Motorsport E 63 AMG at Sydney Motorsport Park in 2015

Erebus Motorsport competed in the Australian V8 Supercars Championship with E 63 AMGs between 2013 and 2015. These race cars had very little in common with the road going versions with only the exterior being shared with the race cars.
