= Mercedes-Benz ConceptFASCINATION =

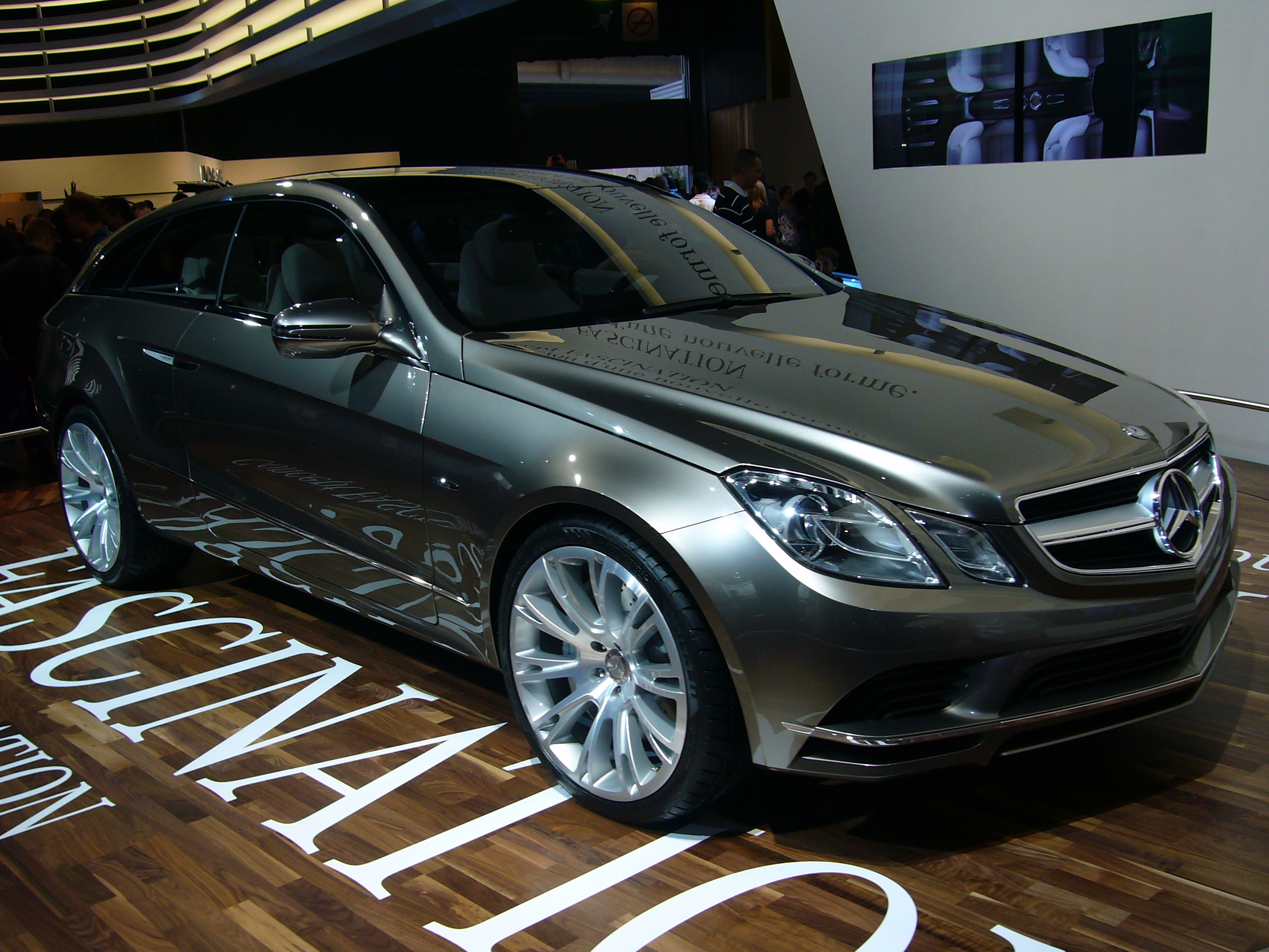
Mercedes-Benz ConceptFASCINATION

The Mercedes-Benz ConceptFASCINATION is a concept car created in Germany by Mercedes-Benz. It was revealed to the public on September 11, 2008, and appeared at the 2008 Paris Motor Show. The shooting-brake-style concept previewed the next-generation Mercedes E-Class (W212). The concept was also a preview for the CLS-Class Shooting Brake.

== Precursive design elements ==
In German car-design circles, the term 'Fascination' is used to describe a 'new direction', with various elements such as the nose and profile likely to appear on the next-generation E-Class, to be revealed at the 2009 Geneva Motor Show, and its derivatives, including the CLS 4-door coupé.

== Interior ==
The interior features seating for four people, and is upholstered in a combination of dark leather and light nubuck leather, with a combination of walnut, chrome and aluminum trim. The load floor is finished in wood with aluminum protective rails, and features two compartments at either side containing two sets of binoculars and a digital camera, as well as a smoked glass table in the center that rises up to reveal a humidor and a refrigerated compartment.

== Specifications ==
The ConceptFASCINATION is powered by a 2.2-litre four-cylinder BlueTec turbo-diesel engine, with emissions-cutting AdBlue technology. The engine develops 150 kW (201 hp; 204 PS) of power and 500 N⋅m (369 lb⋅ft) of torque, and is combined with a 6-speed manual gearbox. This powertrain made production in 2008 as the OM 651, debuting in the C 250 CDI BlueEFFICIENCY Prime Edition, before being offered in other models.

== Gallery ==
Rear view

Side view
