= Nissan Nuvu =

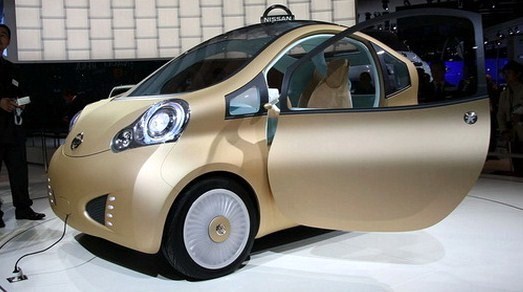
- Front view, door open

Overview
- Manufacturer: Nissan
- Production: 2008

Body and chassis
- Class: Concept car
- Body style: 2-door hatchback (2+1 seats)
- Layout: rear-engine, rear-wheel-drive

Dimensions
- Wheelbase: 1980 mm
- Length: 3000 mm
- Width: 1550 mm
- Height: 2700 mm

The Nissan Nuvu (Japanese 日産・ニューヴ Nyuuvu, literally meaning new view – "new look") is a compact all-electric city car produced by Japanese car manufacturer Nissan and presented at the 2008 Paris Motor Show. The concept car featured 2+1 seating, with solar panels shaped like tree leaves on the roof that channel the sun's power through a "tree trunk" conduit in the centre of the vehicle. It can reach about 75 mph (121 km/h) and travel up to about 80 mi (129 km) on an electric charge. A production model based on the Nuvu was not created, but some of the technologies used on the concept were subsequently installed on the production Nissan Leaf.

== Concept ==
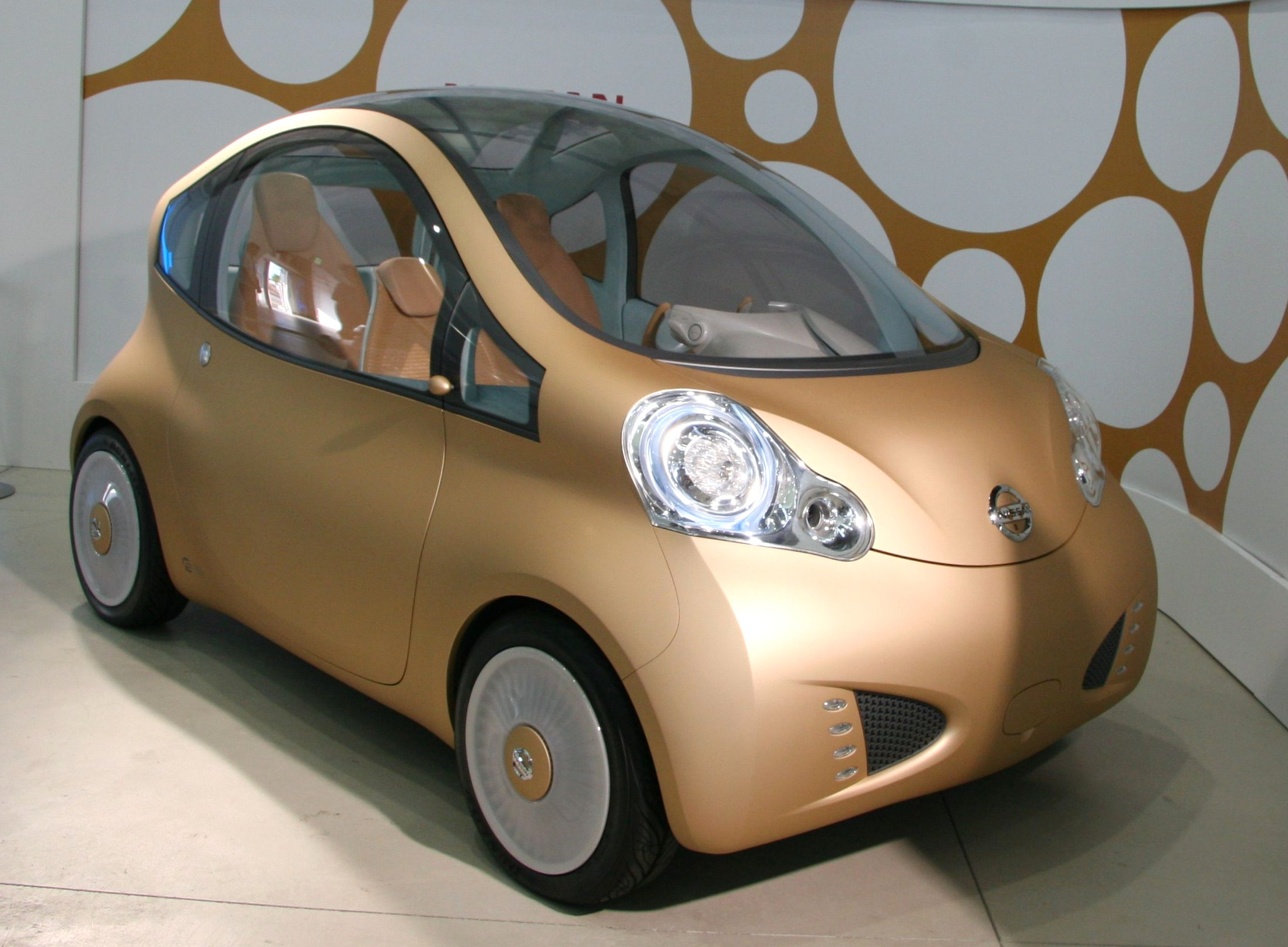
Nissan Nuvu

According to Nissan, since most people use only one or two seats in a vehicle, the Nuvu is a three-seater, with one seat being foldable.

The official presentation of the model took place at the Paris Motor Show in October 2008.

== Design and construction ==
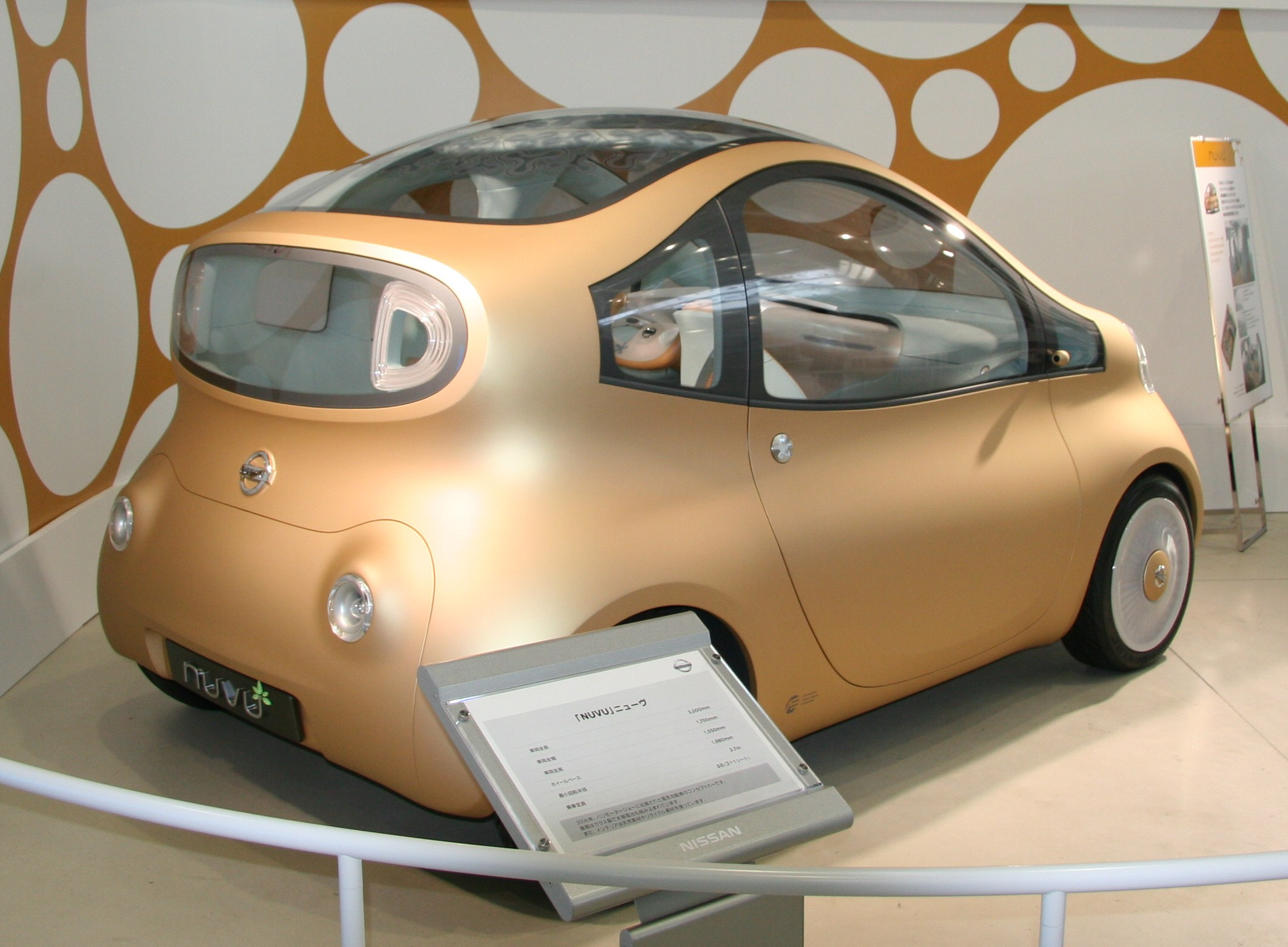
Rear view

Inspired by a tropical fish, the concept is a two-door hatchback (no tailgate) with two permanent and one folding seats. The model is painted in a gold colour, named "Soft Feel Sandy Gold". The windshield extends into a panoramic roof on which solar panels are located, designed to appear similar to leaves with three-ray symmetry. The taillights are located on the rear window.

The interior configuration is unconventional: the driver's seat is located in the usual place, behind it there is an area for storing luggage, the front passenger seat is folding, and behind it there is another permanent place for the rear passenger. The most unusual element is a tree trunk-shaped column located behind the driver's seat. It branches out on the roof and collects energy from solar panels, increasing the vehicle's range. In addition to this function, it is also a power element that increases body rigidity. There is no direct connection between the steering wheel and the wheels – Nuvu is equipped with By-Wire technology (previously used on the Nissan Pivo concept), thanks to which the steering mechanism and brakes are driven by servos, which receive signals from the steering wheel and pedals. The interior is made from recycled materials.

=== Specification ===
The concept was built on a dedicated platform. The electric motor is located at the rear and drives the rear axle. No exact data regarding the engine has been published; all that is known is that the power reserve is 130 km and the maximum speed is 120 km/h. Lithium-ion batteries are located under the seats to keep the car's centre of gravity lower. Their characteristics were also not disclosed, since they were later used on the production model Nissan Leaf. According to Nissan, with fast charging, the car can be charged to 80% in 20 minutes. When using a regular 220-volt outlet, charging takes up to 4 hours.

== Reviews and ratings ==
The Auto Express magazine conducted a test drive of the Nissan Nuvu in October 2008. The model was noted as "ideal for the city of the future." The only downside was the inconvenient location of the gear shift mechanism and hand brake. The overall rating was five stars out of five.

== See also ==
- Nissan Motors
