= Peugeot RC =

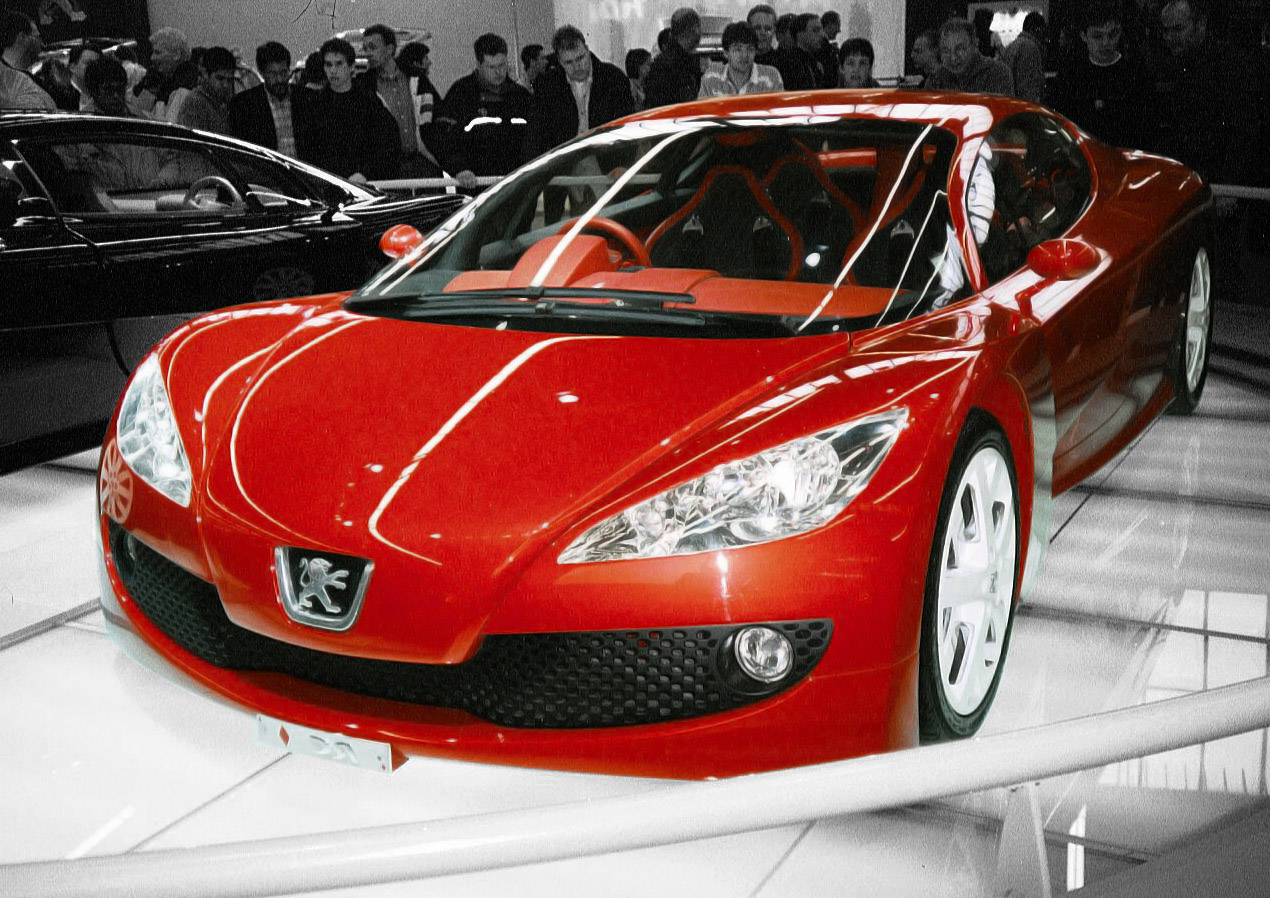
- Peugeot RC Cup variant

Overview
- Manufacturer: Peugeot
- Production: 2002 (Spades & Diamonds); 2008 (HYmotion4)
- Designer: Nicolas Brissoneau (Spades & Diamonds); Boris Reinmöller (HYmotion4)

Body and chassis
- Class: Sports car
- Body style: 2-door 2+2 coupe 4-door 2+2 sedan coupe
- Layout: Mid-engined, rear-wheel drive Mid-engined, four-wheel drive
- Doors: Scissor (Spades & Diamonds); Conventional (HYmotion4)

Powertrain
- Engine: 2.0L EW10 J4S (RFK) petrol I4 (Spade); 2.2L DW12 TED4 Turbo diesel I4 (Diamond); 1.6 Prince Turbo I4 (HYmotion4)
- Electric motor: Synchronous with permanent magnets electric motor (RC HYmotion4)
- Transmission: 6-speed sequential manual
- Hybrid drivetrain: PHEV (RC HYmotion4)

Dimensions
- Wheelbase: 2800 mm (110.2 in)
- Curb weight: 900 kg (1984 lb)

The Peugeot RC is a concept car built by French automaker Peugeot and introduced at the 2002 Geneva Motor Show.

== Design ==
The RC was a mid-engined, rear-wheel drive sports car shown in two versions. The "Spade" was painted black and featured a 2.0L naturally aspirated inline-four petrol engine. Power was quoted at 181 bhp (133.2 kW). The red "Diamond" was powered by a 2.2L diesel engine that was capable of the same performance but with different driving and ride characteristics. Both variants were equipped with a six-speed sequential gearbox, featured a 900 kg (1,984 lb) carbon-fiber body, ceramic disc brakes, and a 0-60 mph (0–97 km/h) time of 6.0 seconds.

== Reception ==
The bodywork, designed by Peugeot Style Centre, was praised as graceful and imaginative, and has influenced subsequent Peugeot cars. The diesel Diamond was quoted as capable of a fuel economy of 57 mpg (4.1 L/100 km), a very impressive figure for any car with sporting ambitions. The television show BBC Top Gear, not known for its love of diesels, reviewed the Peugeot RC Diamond in 2002 and presenter Richard Hammond remarked that it was "possibly the first proper diesel sports car."

== Hybrid electric ==
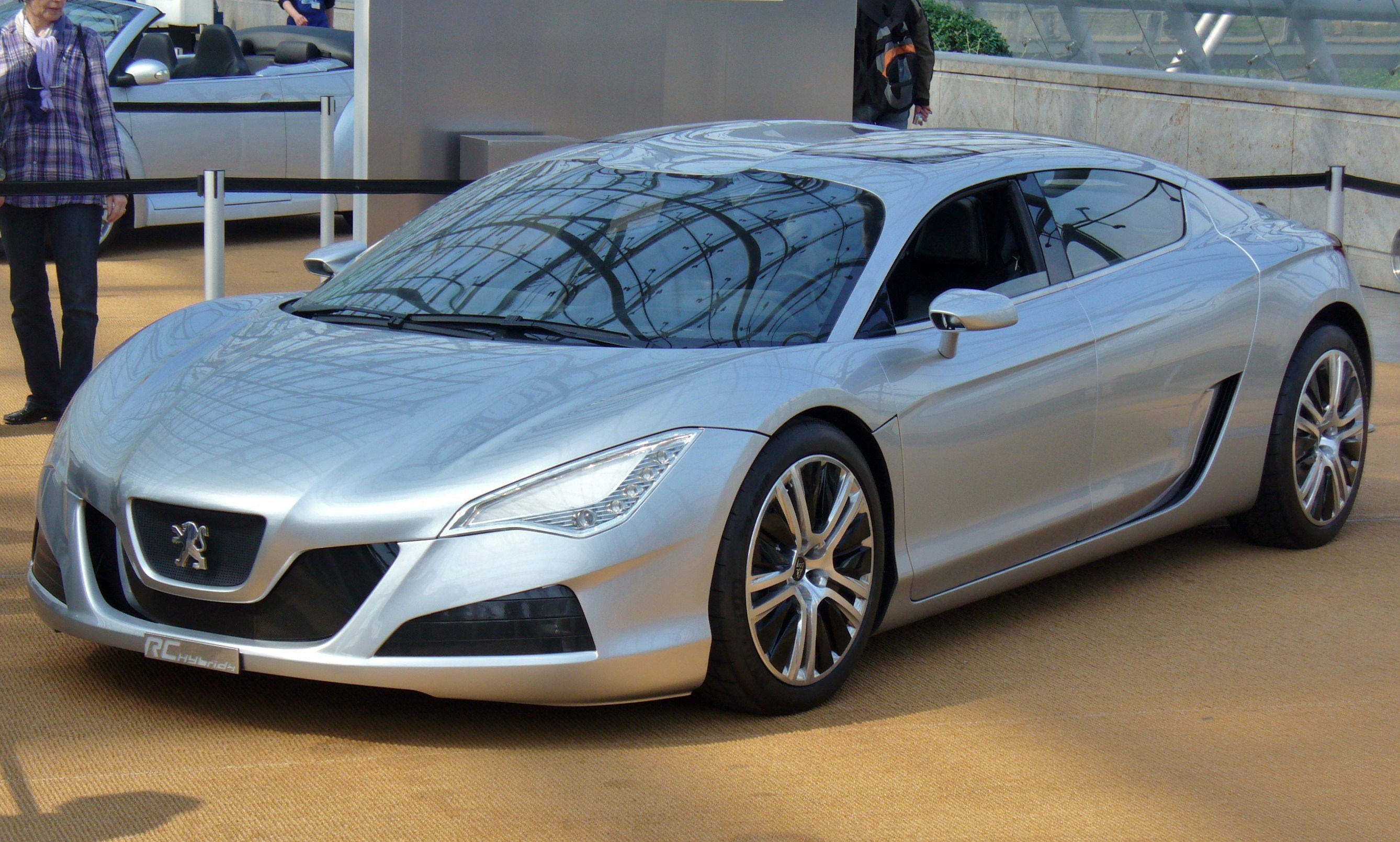
Peugeot RC HYmotion4 at the 2010 Auto Mobil International

Peugeot has presented in the Paris Motor Show a new concept hybrid electric sports sedan. Similar to the drivetrain model used in the Chevy Volt, the 2009 Peugeot RC concept promises the ability to run solely off electric power for extended periods, with a hybrid electric powertrain filling in the gaps when extra range is needed

The Peugeot RC HYmotion4 includes a 70 kW (94 hp) electric motor at the front wheels .
