= HR1 =

HR1 or similar terms may refer to:

- hr1, radio station in Hesse, Germany
- HR 1 (radio station), Croatian Radio's first channel
- HR 1 (star), an alternate designation for the star HD 3
- H.R. 1 (short for House of Representatives 1), an identifier for legislation considered by the United States House of Representatives
- Peugeot HR1, concept car
- VR Class Hr1, a Finnish locomotive
