= 2010 Paris Motor Show =

International auto show

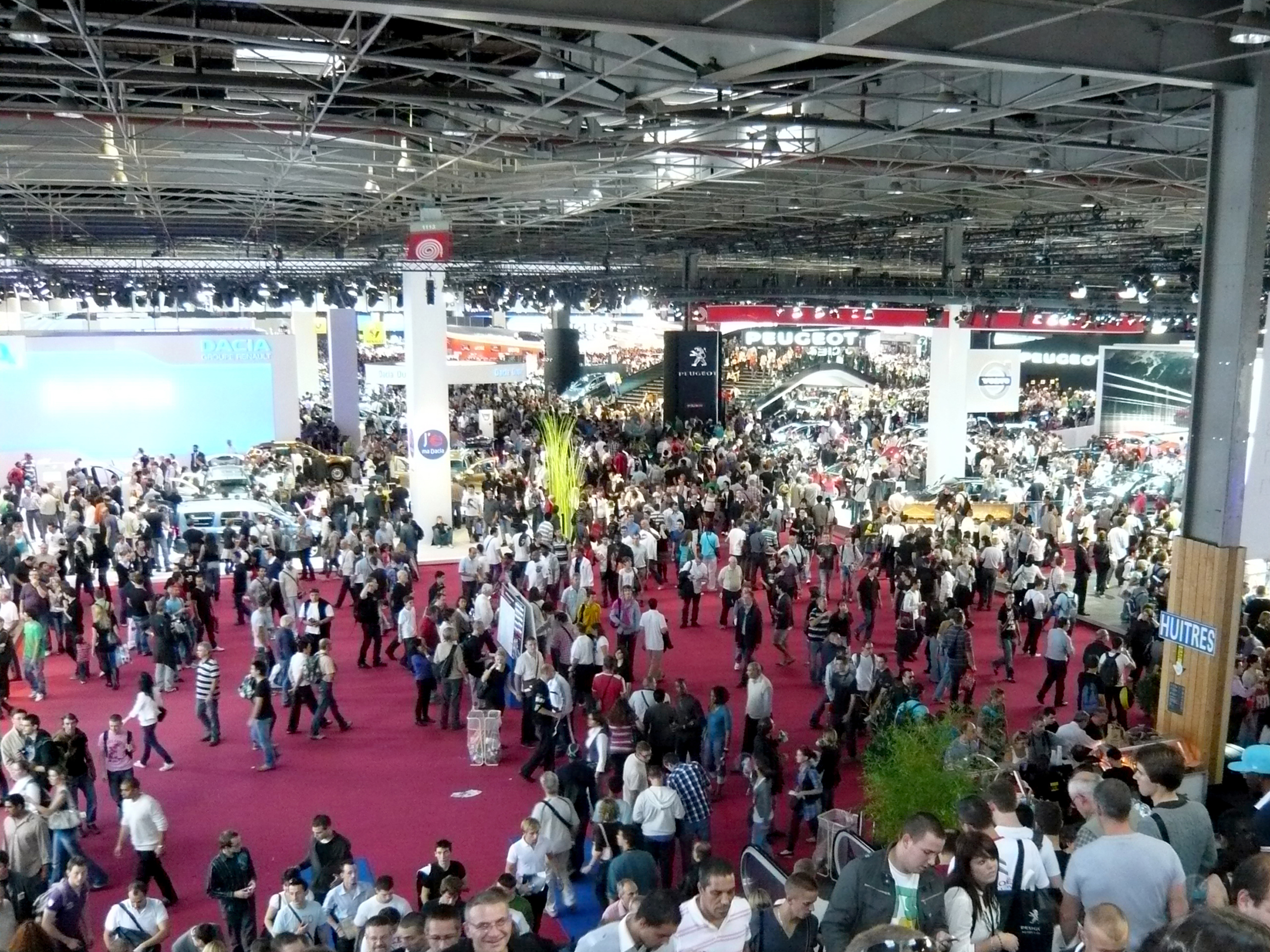
- General floor view, 2010 Paris Motor Show
- Genre: Auto show
- Begins: October 2, 2010
- Ends: October 17, 2010
- Venue: Paris Expo Porte de Versailles
- Location: Paris
- Country: France
- Previous event: 2008 Paris Motor Show
- Next event: 2012 Paris Motor Show

The 2010 Paris Motor Show took place from 2 October to 17 October 2010, in Paris expo Porte de Versailles.

For 2010, the theme of the special exhibition was "The Incredible Collection 2: automobile manufacturers collections and museums."

== Introductions ==
=== Production cars ===
- Audi A7
- Audi R8 Spyder
- Bentley Continental GT
- BMW X3
- Chevrolet Aveo
- Chevrolet Captiva
- Chevrolet Cruze Hatchback
- Chevrolet Orlando
- Citroën C4 II
- Citroën C5 facelift
- Citroën DS4
- Ferrari 599 GTO
- Ferrari 599 SA Aperta
- Ford Focus ST
- Ford Mondeo ECOnetic
- Honda Jazz Hybrid
- Hyundai Genesis Coupe (European debut)
- Hyundai i10
- Hyundai ix20
- Jeep Grand Cherokee (European debut)
- Lexus IS
- Lotus Evora S
- Lotus Evora IPS
- Maserati GranTurismo MC Stradale
- Mastretta MXT
- Mazda 2 restyle
- Mercedes-Benz A-Class#W169 electric
- Mercedes-Benz CLS-Class (W218)
- Nissan GT-R facelift
- Nissan X-Trail facelift
- Opel Astra Sports Tourer
- Peugeot 3008 Hybrid4
- Peugeot 508 (World debut)
- Porsche 911 Carrera GTS
- Porsche 911 Speedster
- Range Rover Evoque
- Renault Espace facelift
- Renault Laguna facelift
- Renault Latitude
- Renault Twizy
- Saab 9-3 SportWagon Electric
- Suzuki Swift
- Toyota Ractis
- Toyota Verso-S (World debut)
- Venturi Fétish II
- Volkswagen Passat facelift, (B7)
- Volvo S60 R-Design
- Volvo V60

=== Concept cars ===
- Audi e-Tron Spyder
- Audi quattro concept
- BMW 6 Series concept
- Citroën Lacoste
- Exagon Furtive e-GT
- Hyundai ix35 diesel-hybrid concept
- Infiniti IPL G Convertible concept
- Jaguar C-X75
- Kia Pop EV
- Lamborghini Sesto Elemento
- Lotus CityCar plug-in hybrid concept
- Lotus Elise concept
- Lotus Elite
- Lotus Esprit
- Lotus Eterne
- Mazda Shinari
- Nissan Townpod
- Opel GTC Paris
- Peugeot HR1
- Peugeot EX1 Concept
- Renault Zoe
- Renault DeZir
- Saab ePower
- SEAT IBE (updated)
- Toyota FT-CH (European debut)
- Venturi America
- Volvo C30 DRIVe Electric

=== Motorsport cars ===
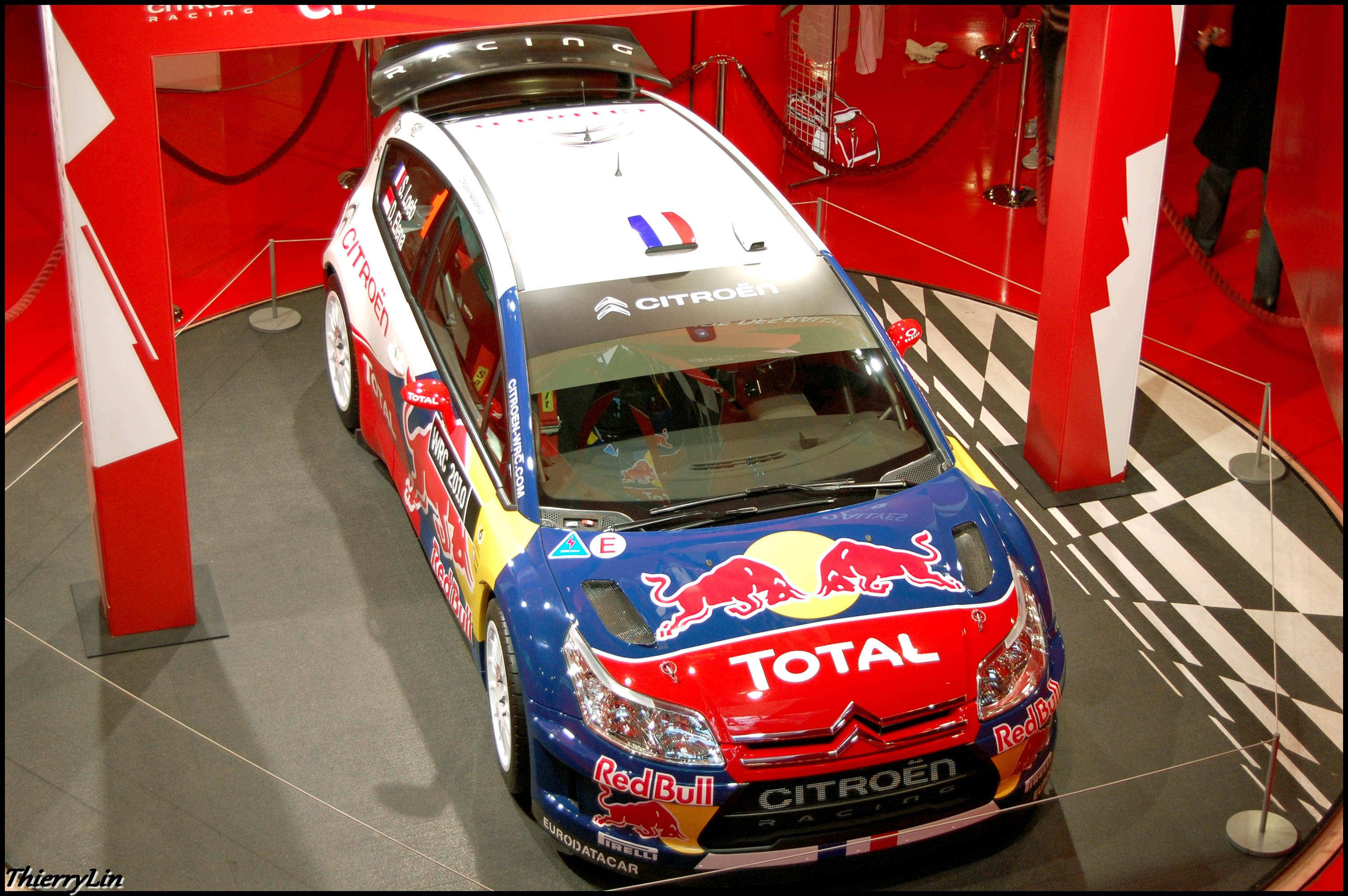
Citroën C4 WRC at Paris 2010

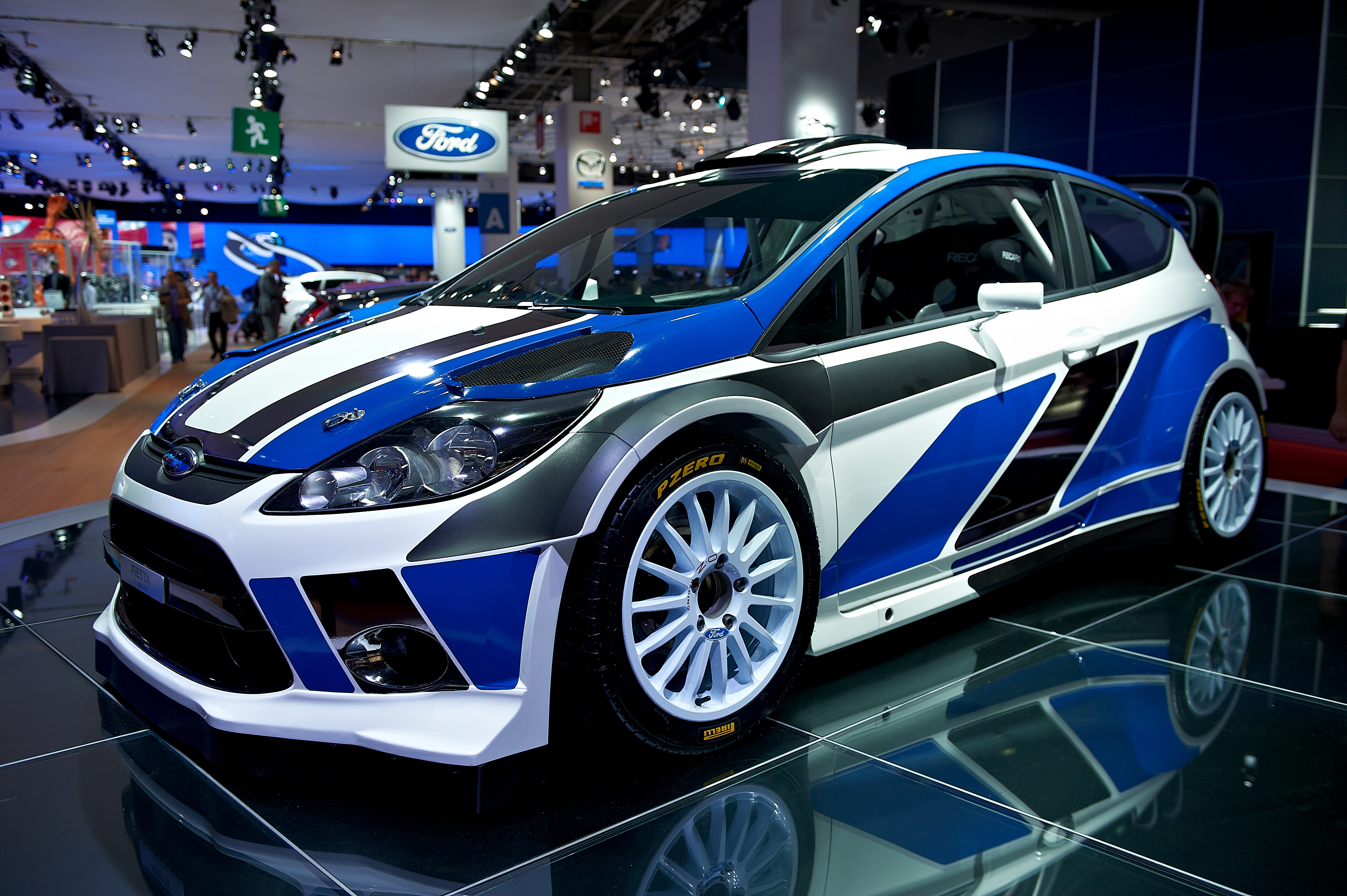
Fiesta RS WRC at Paris 2010

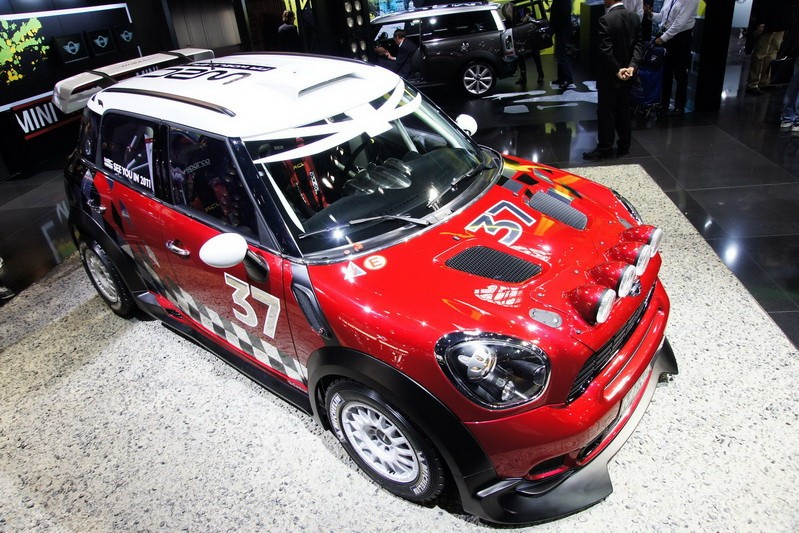
Mini Cooper WRC at Paris 2010

- Citroën C4 WRC (Refresh)
- Citroën DS3 WRC (European Debut)
- Ford Fiesta RS WRC (European Debut)
- Mini Countryman WRC (European Debut)

== Exhibitors ==
- Abarth
- Alfa Romeo
- Aixam Mega
- Audi
- Bentley
- Bi-Scot
- BMW
- Cadillac
- Chatenet Automobiles
- Chevrolet
- Chrysler
- Citroën
- Comarth
- Courb
- CT&T United
- Dacia
- Eco & Mobilité
- Ecomobilys
- Eon Motors
- Exagon
- Ferrari
- Fiat
- Fisker
- Ford
- GEF Motors
- Grecav
- Heuliez
- Honda
- Hyundai
- Infiniti
- Isuzu
- Jaguar
- Jeep
- Kia
- Lamborghini
- Lancia
- Land Rover
- Lexus
- Ligier
- Lumeneo
- Mam Strager
- Maserati
- Mastretta
- Matra
- Maybach
- Mazda
- Mega
- Mercedes-Benz
- Microcar
- Mini
- Mitsubishi
- Nissan
- Think
- Opel
- Peugeot
- Porsche
- Renault
- Rolls-Royce
- Saab
- Seat
- Škoda Auto
- Smart
- Suzuki
- Tazzari
- Tesla Motors
- Toyota
- Pininfarina Bollore
- Venturi
- Volkswagen
- Volvo

== See also ==
- Paris Motor Show
