= Lumeneo Neoma =

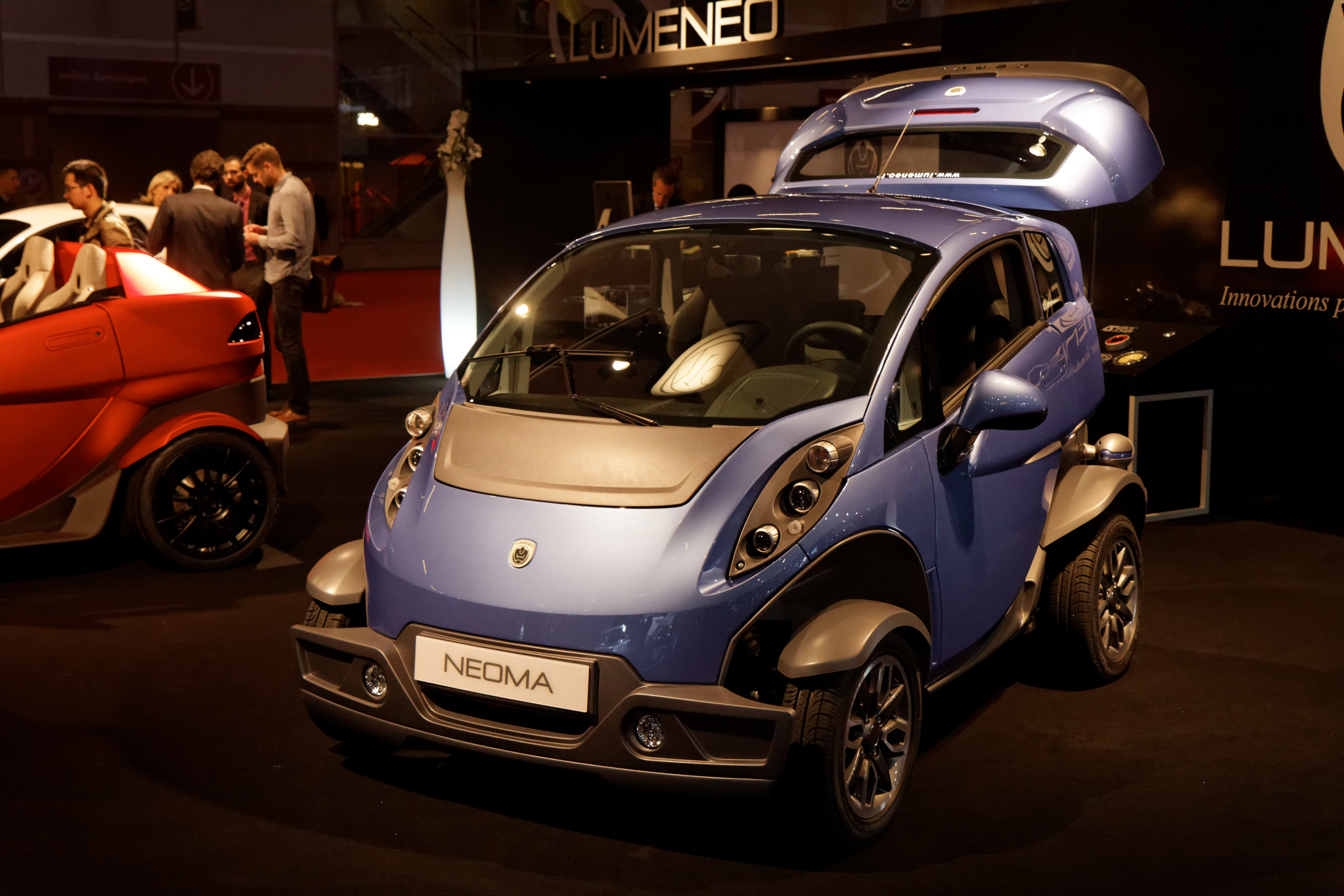

Overview
- Manufacturer: Lumeneo
- Production: 2013
- Assembly: Nompatelize, France

Body and chassis
- Class: City car
- Body style: 2-door

Powertrain
- Electric motor: 35 kW (48 PS; 47 bhp) electric
- Transmission: None
- Battery: 14.2 kWh lithium polymer battery
- Electric range: 140 km (87 mi) (European cycle)

Dimensions
- Length: 2,690 mm (105.9 in)
- Width: 1,600 mm (63.0 in)
- Height: 1,480 mm (58.3 in)
- Kerb weight: 870 kg (1,918 lb)

The Lumeneo Neoma was a city electric car manufactured by Lumeneo in France. The concept car was unveiled at the 2010 Paris Motor Show. Production began in March 2013, and retail deliveries in the French market began in May 2013. The Neoma had a range of 140 km (87 mi) under the NEDC cycle and a top speed of 100 km/h (62 mph).

The Neoma price started at €21,700 (~US$28,900) excluding the battery pack and before the €7,000 government bonus available in France. The battery was rented for a monthly fee of €145 (~ US$193). Only three units were sold during its first month in the market. After selling only 10 units the manufacturer filed for bankruptcy in November 2013.

The Neoma was quite similar to the Smart electric drive that also was made in Eastern France, was sold since 2012 at a similar high price, but with better specs.

== See also ==
- Electric car use by country
- Government incentives for plug-in electric vehicles
- List of electric cars currently available
- List of modern production plug-in electric vehicles
- List of production battery electric vehicles
- Lumeneo SMERA
- Plug-in electric vehicle
