= Lumeneo SMERA =

Electric vehicle concept car

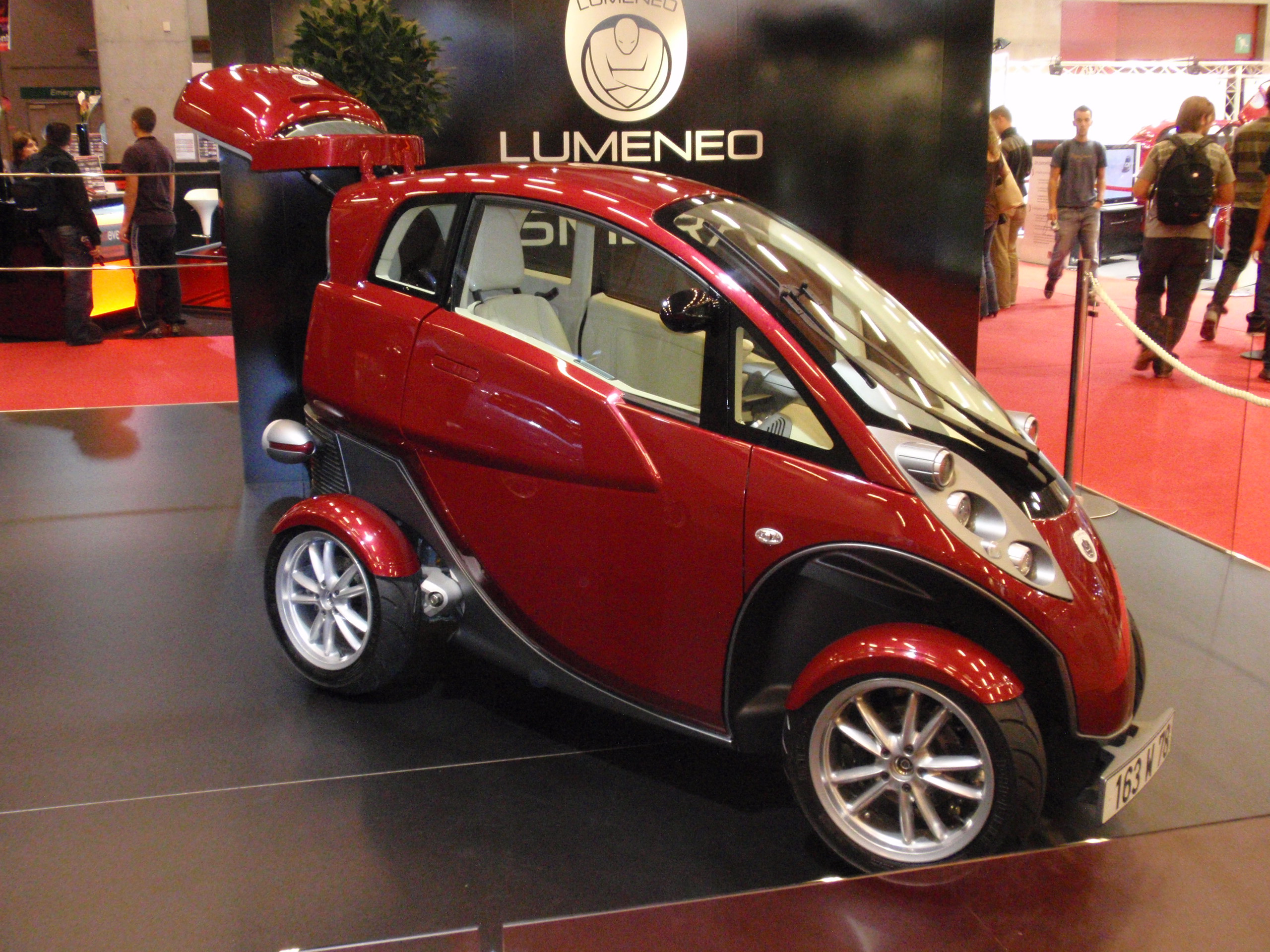
Lumeneo SMERA at the 2008 Paris Motor Show

The SMERA is an ultracompact battery electric vehicle (BEV) concept car produced by Lumeneo. The concept car is a two-seater tilting car which tilts up to 25° in curves. With a length of 2500 mm and width of 960 mm (track 655 mm), it is something between an electric car and a scooter and includes a lithium ion battery pack. It is regulated in Europe as a car (classification M1). Its speed is listed as 110 km/h (68 mph) with a range of 100 kilometres (62 miles). It made its debut at the 2008 Paris Motor Show.

French railroad company SNCF invested €1.5 million in Lumeneo. The French railway reportedly injected capital into Green Cove Engineering, a provider of carpooling services.

A production version, the Lumeneo Neoma began sales in France in May 2013. After selling only 10 units Lumeneo filed for bankruptcy in November 2013.
