= Nissan Townpod =

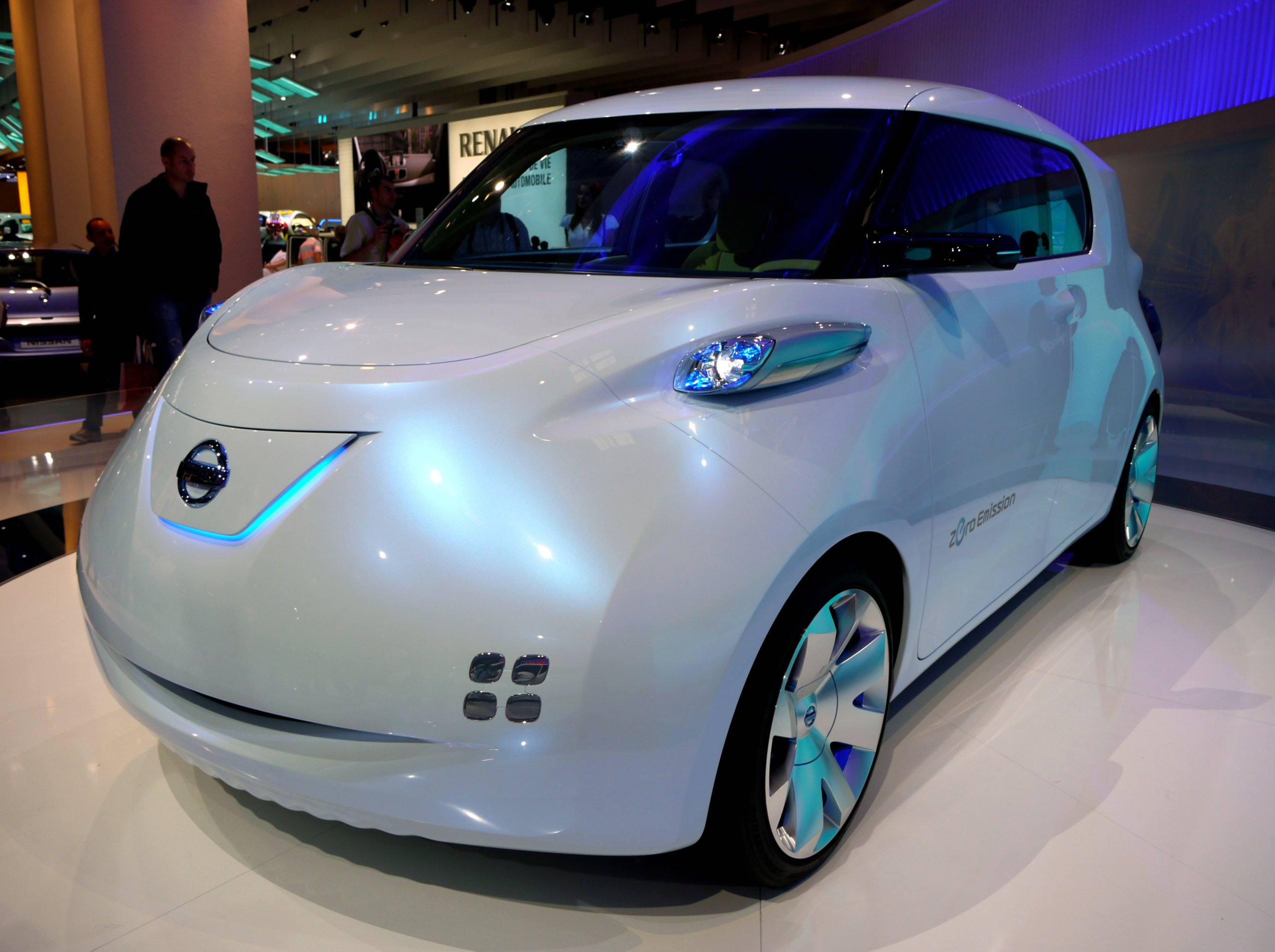

Overview
- Manufacturer: Nissan
- Production: 2010

Powertrain
- Engine: 78hp Electric motor

The Nissan Townpod is an electric concept car presented by the Japanese car manufacturer Nissan at the 2010 Paris Motor Show.

== Overview ==
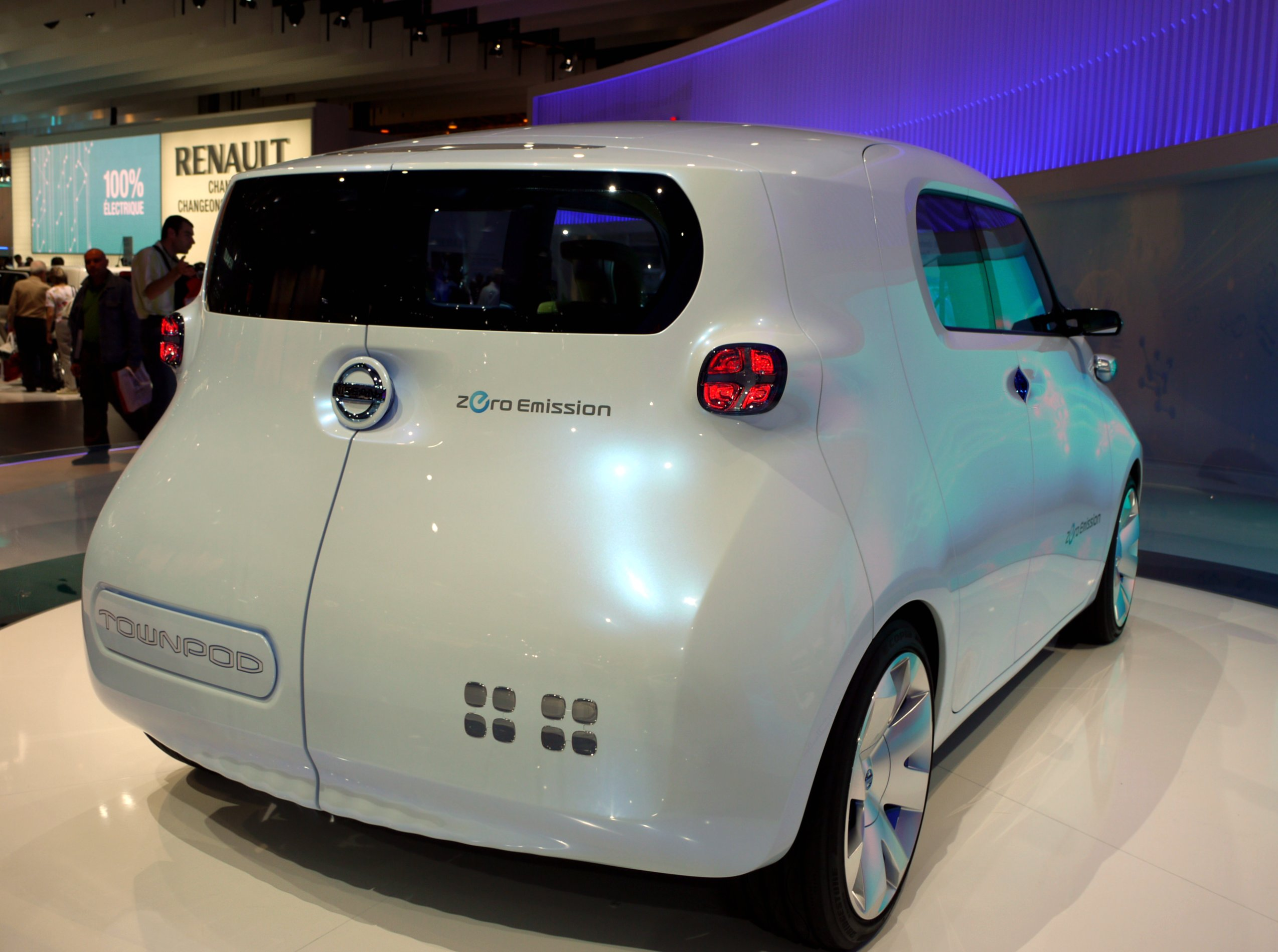
Rear view

The Townpod was developed focusing on the versatility, so that it could adapt to different and peculiar needs.

With the Townpod concept Nissan is offering the chance of using proprietary as well as third-party sourced accessories so that customers can customize the interior specifications of their vehicle.

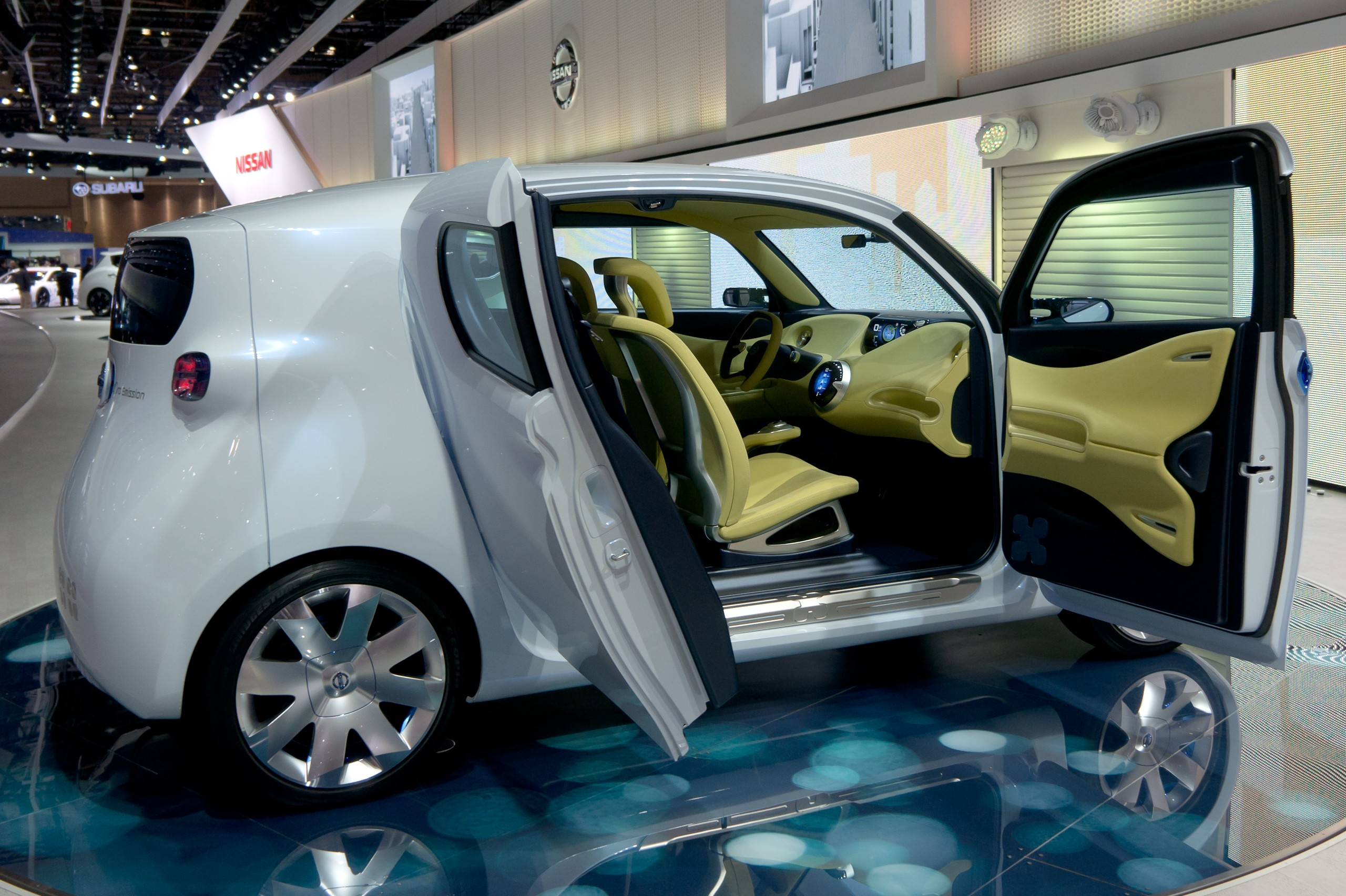
View with front and rear doors open

By doing so everyone can adapt the car to their individual needs or daily usage. For example, a musician transporting its kit between gigs, a Delicatessen proprietor distributing their wares or an Architect carrying drawings to a client musician.

== Design ==
The Townpod design features several familiar visual elements from other Nissan cars. The Drivetrain featured in the Concept car is the same zero emission technology that is fitted on the Nissan Leaf. As in the Leaf, the charging points are located in the nose behind an automatically retracting cover.

The headlights on the Townpod serve as position markers when the blue "petals" are closed and headlights when open, while the external location of the pods eases basic maintenance.

Thanks to the position of the headlights, the Townpod gets a bonnet line which can recall the Nissan 370Z, which ends up in a blue tinted glass house, which resembles the Nissan Cube.
