= Exagon Furtive-eGT =

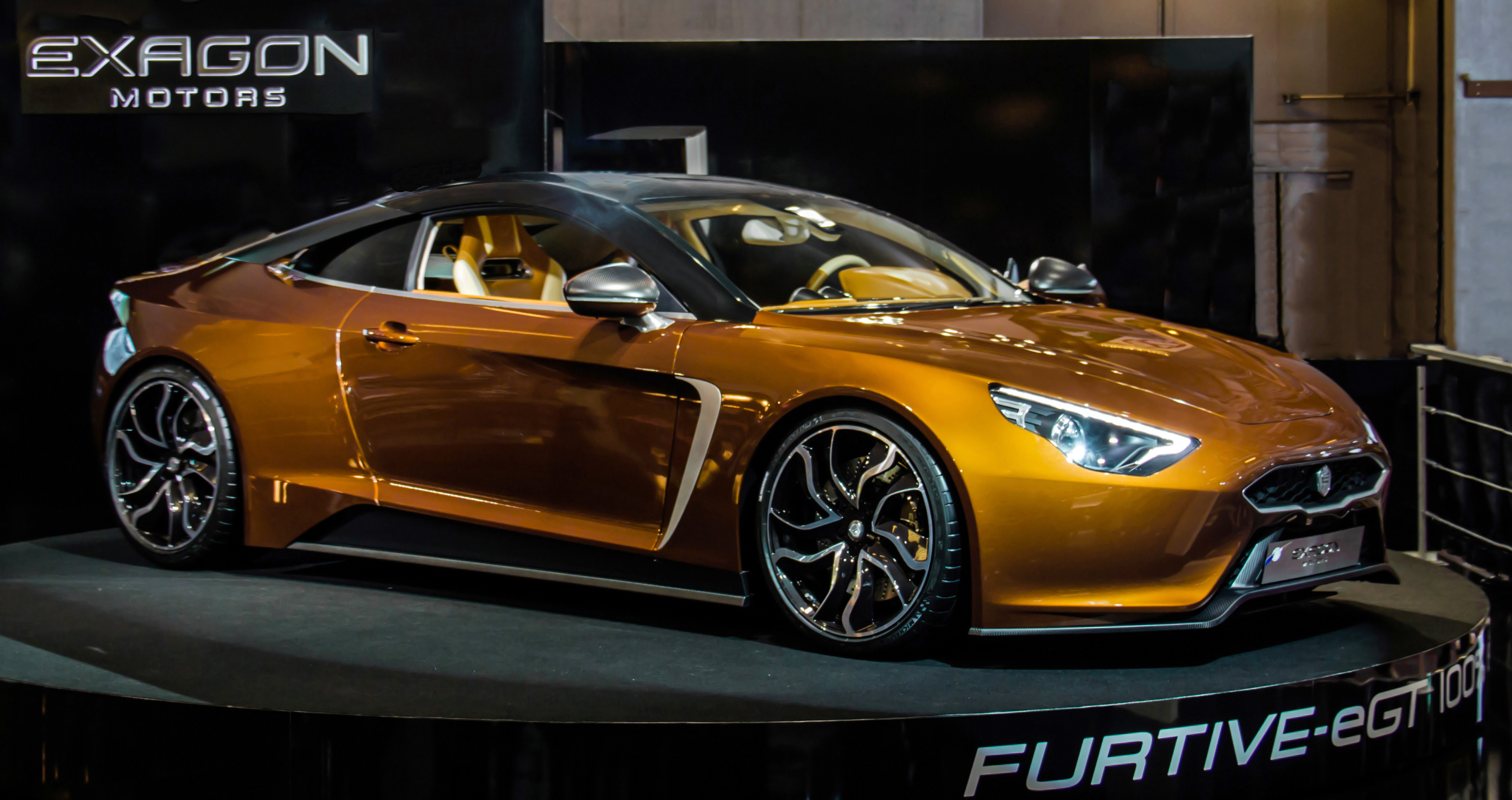

Overview
- Manufacturer: Exagon Motors
- Production: 2010 (Concept); 2013 (Pre-production)
- Assembly: France

Body and chassis
- Class: Sports car
- Body style: 2-door coupé
- Layout: Rear motor, Rear-wheel drive

Powertrain
- Electric motor: 2 Siemens water-cooled motors (148 kW each)
- Transmission: 3-speed
- Battery: 53 kWh lithium-ion
- Range: 224 mi (360 km) in the city

The Exagon Furtive-eGT is a four-seat electric grand tourer sports car produced by Exagon Motors. It was unveiled at the 2010 Paris Motor Show as a concept. A slightly amended pre-production version was launched at the Geneva Motor Show in March 2013.

The Furtive-eGT has two electric water-cooled motors that spin at 10,000 rpm and a three speed semi-automatic transmission bringing it to a top speed of 155 mph (249 km/h). Each of the Exagon's motors develops 148 kW (198 hp; 201 PS), producing a maximum output of 402 hp (300 kW; 408 PS). This allows it to accelerate from 0 to 100 km/h (62 mph) in 3.5 seconds. The lithium-ion battery has 53 kWh capacity providing a claimed range of 360 kilometers (223 miles) in the city, without memory effect and highly recyclable and a minimum capacity after 3,000 cycles (approximately 10 years of use) of over 80%.

Exagon says it used Formula One technology to develop the chassis, which consists of a carbon fiber/honeycomb structure monocoque to which cast aluminium subframes are attached. The body of the Furtive-eGT is also made from advanced composite materials and weighs 273 lb (124 kg).

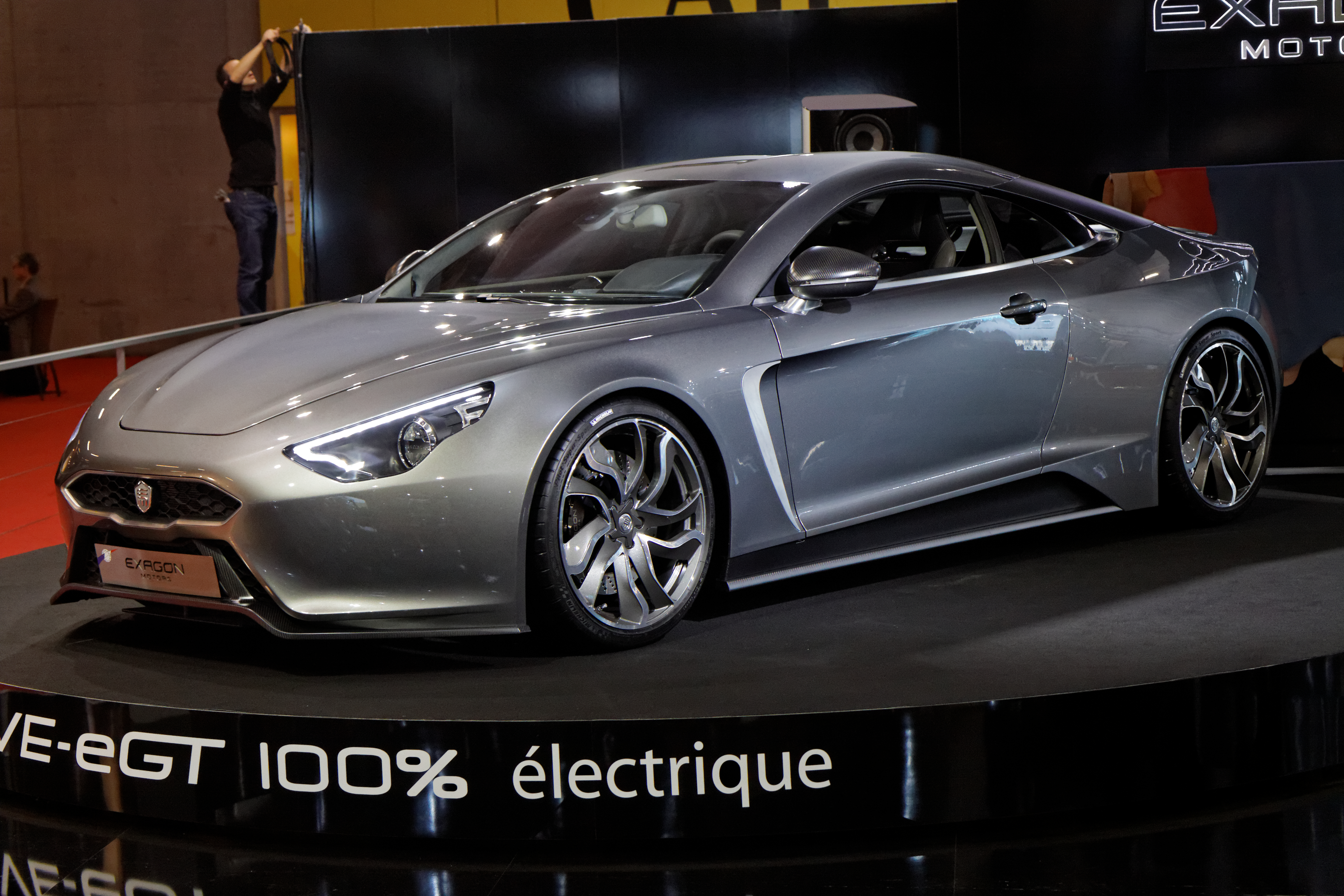
Exagon Furtive eGT at the 2012 Mondial de l'Automobile

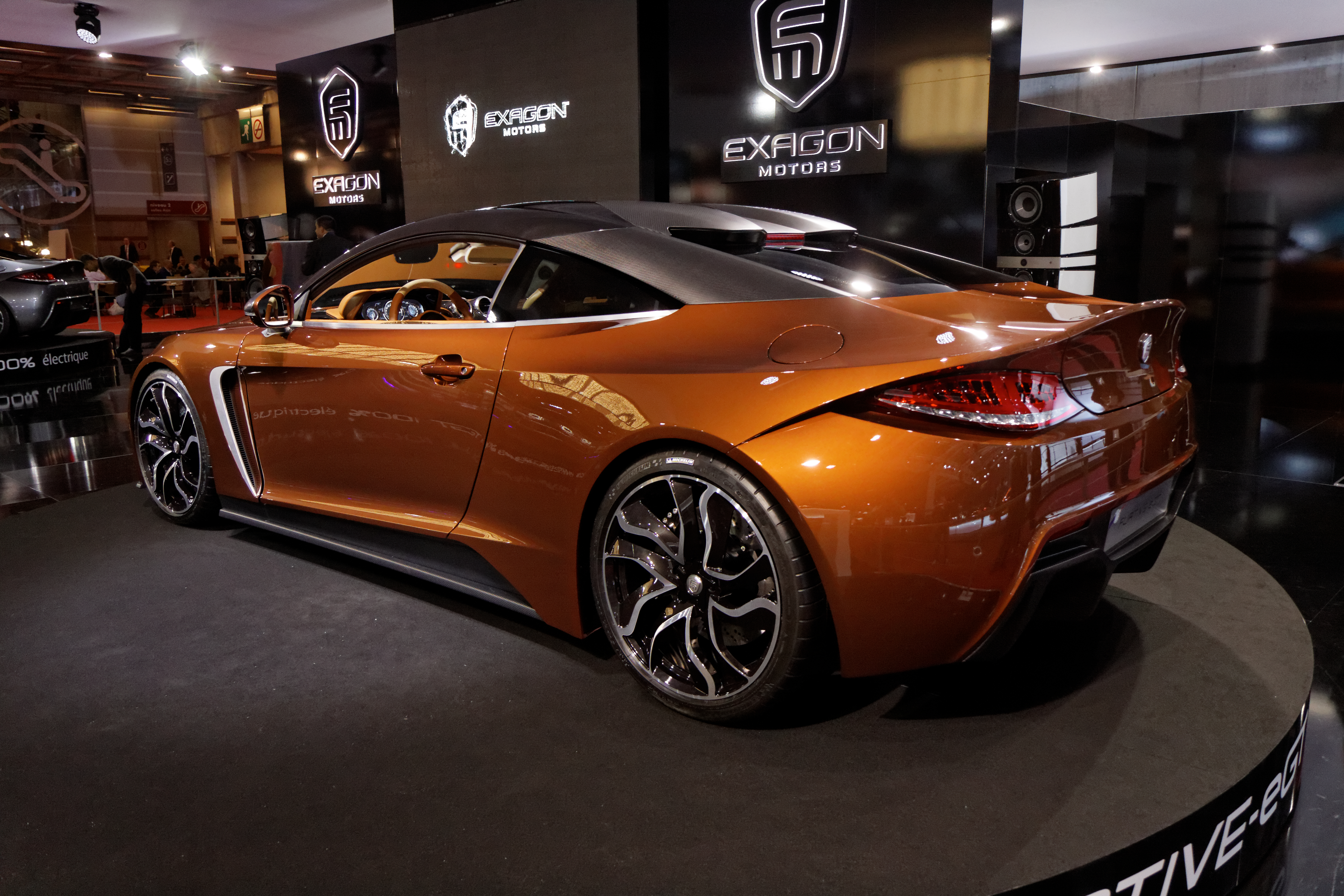
Rear view
