= PSA HYbrid4 =

PSA Peugeot-Citroën's hybrid powertrain system

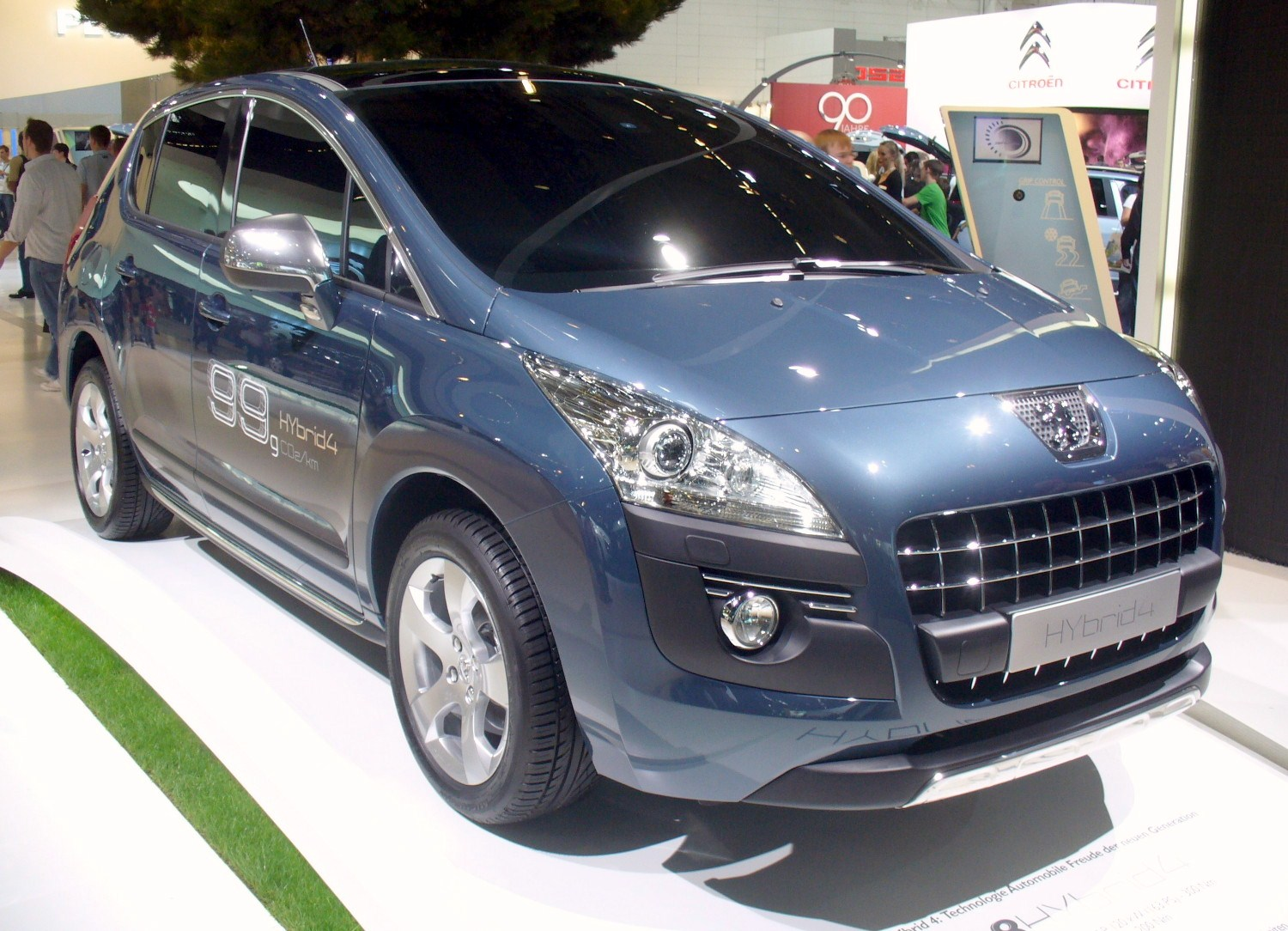
Peugeot 3008 HYbrid4

HYbrid4 is PSA Peugeot-Citroën's in-house developed TTR hybrid powertrain system, shared between the two manufacturers. It takes the form of a diesel engine powering the front wheels coupled with an electric motor powering the rear wheels to provide a 4WD hybrid with a short fully electric range. The system made its production debut on the Peugeot 3008 HYbrid4 in 2011, emitting 99 g of carbon dioxide per kilometer. The 3008 HYbrid4 returns combined fuel consumption of 3.8 litres/100 km, beating the smaller Toyota Prius. It also operates in four driver-selected modes: Auto, Sport, ZEV (pure-electric) and 4WD.

The 1st generation HYbrid4 system was available 2011–2017. Since 2020 there's a new HYbrid/HYbrid4 system, which is using plug-in technology, either FWD or AWD with power between 180hp (308 1.6 HYbrid) and 360hp (508 PSE).

== Operation ==
The Hybrid4 powertrain combines a 120 kW/163 hp (DW10CTED4 PSA-Ford Motor Company joint developed) 2.0 litre HDi FAP EURO5 diesel engine with a 28 kW (37 hp) electric motor. The powertrain offers 4 working modes:

AUTO, in which the vehicle strives for the best fuel economy - throttle response is slow and the automated manual transmission shifts early, furthermore the vehicle switches to ZEV mode as often as possible;

SPORT mode offers a combined power output of 200 hp (150 kW) and 500 Nm at speeds up to 120 km/h, throttle response is very aggressive and the engine revs up to 4000 RPM before upshifts;

4WD mode keeps the HDi engine running constantly and charging the high voltage battery to offer constant AWD with 60:40 split at speeds up to 120 km/h;

ZEV mode is available if the high voltage battery is at least 1/3 full. In this mode the vehicle moves only via the rear electric motor and the performance is limited. ZEV mode is available at speeds of up to ~60 km/h with moderate acceleration, the range on a full charge is about ~2 km (~1.2 miles), the A/C compressor is automatically switched off in this mode. If the driver presses the accelerator beyond a certain point, the HDi engine restarts automatically as to offer better acceleration and the vehicle goes to AUTO mode.

Auto Start-Stop is part of the HYbrid4 system and is available in all modes except for 4WD when the engine is constantly running so that the reversible alternator can top up the battery and provide constant rear drive. The engine automatically shuts down whenever possible (cruising downhill at speeds of up to 85 km/h when the battery is not fully charged or cruising on a level surface at speeds of up to ~60 km/h), when coming to a stop the HDi engine shuts down at speeds below 30 km/h. The Auto Start-Stop function is possible with the use of the BOSCH SMG (Separate Motor-Generator) 138/80 (138 mm in diameter, 80 mm long) reversible starter-generator motor. Restarting can occur at any moment, if the HYbrid4 control unit determines that additional power is needed; or the battery needs to be topped up; or the A/C compressor needs to kick in. The engine also restarts when the battery is fully charged and the vehicle is going downhill, as to offer additional engine braking, no fuel is used in this mode, but ZERO EMISSION is not displayed, as the HDi engine is rotating.

== HV Battery ==
The high voltage battery consist of 42 packs of 4 D-size SANYO batteries. The nominal voltage of the battery is 201.6 V, the nominal capacity is 1.1kWh and the peak power output is 31kW. The battery operates in the ~150–270 V range depending on the state of charge and acceleration/charging demand. To offer a longer battery pack life the HCU (hybrid control unit) never charges the batteries over 90%, nor discharges them under 30%. The battery pack has an independent air cooling system which can operate at different flow rates depending on the cooling requirements of the unit. The cooling system can be operative even if the vehicle is locked; operation noise and a warm draft can be felt at the left rear quarter panel of the car. The HV battery typically lasts about 150.000-200.000km or 6-10 years before starting to lose capacity noticeably. The vehicle could be driven with a "bad" battery and does not lose the 4WD function, however the EV range is significantly reduced, resulting in poorer fuel economy.

== Rear electric drive ==
The rear electric drive was co-developed by PSA Peugeot-Citroën, Bosch and GKN. It has an integrated clutch mechanism that disengages the rear drive at speeds over 120 km/h to provide less drag and better fuel efficiency at highway speeds. Reverse gear is not mechanical, instead the current going through the electric motor is reversed.

== Bosch SMG in HYbrid4 ==
The Bosch SMG (“separate motor generator”) 180/120 (180 mm in diameter, 120 mm long) electric motor is used as the traction motor in the HYbrid4 system. The unit weighs only 32 kg and is a permanent magnet synchronous motor. In the HYbrid4 system it can deliver up to 27 kW and 200 Nm of power to help provide lower fuel consumption in AUTO and ZEV mode, better grip in 4WD mode and enhanced acceleration in SPORT mode. The SMG 180/120 is also used in the Fiat 500e as main traction motor and in the front axle of the Porsche 918 Spyder.

HYbrid4 incorporates another Bosch permanent magnet synchronous motor, the SMG 138/80 (138 mm in diameter, 80 mm long) in the engine compartment to serve as a high-voltage starter/alternator for the start-stop system. It is also responsible for supplying power to the rear-wheel drive and charging the high voltage battery.

== Common problems and known faults ==
Some of the common problems with the HYbrid4 system include:

- Jerking/stalling and slow shifts of the BMP6 manual piloted gearbox. This problem could easily be overcome by adapting the clutch and shifter mechanisms using the DiagBOX diagnostic tool.
- Noise from the rear electric drive - the bearings of the reducer fail, as the oil is "without servicing" according to the technical documentation. In reality, though, it should be changed every 30.000-50.000km depending on the driving style and conditions.
- Loss of drive, the engine stays in idle, no matter how hard the accelerator pedal is pressed. This is caused due to infrequent changes of the oil of the robotized gearbox.
- The HDI engine does not turn off and a message "ELECTRIC MODE CURRENTLY UNAVAILABLE" is shown. This is caused by an in-built timer, which is supposed to disable the start-stop function once the accessories belt has done 60.000km since the last replacement. If the belt is OK physically - not stretched and without wear marks, the timer can be reset via DiagBOX, otherwise the belt should be changed.
- The accessories belt snaps unexpectedly soon after having been replaced with a new one. This is caused by improper tensioning of the belt.
- Quick discharge/charge of the battery, SoC jumps from 3 to 0 bars or from 4 to 8 bars very rapidly. This is caused by dying NiMH cells in the HV battery. The battery should be disassembled, inspected and the faulty cells should be replaced with new / used ones in good condition. Furthermore, the software of the HV battery ECU should be updated to the latest version, as there are bugs in the earlier version, which lead to a faster deteriorating of the battery.
- The bearings of the Bosch SMG 138/80 high-voltage start-stop alternator are known to fail, which causes the accessories belt to snap.

== Usage ==
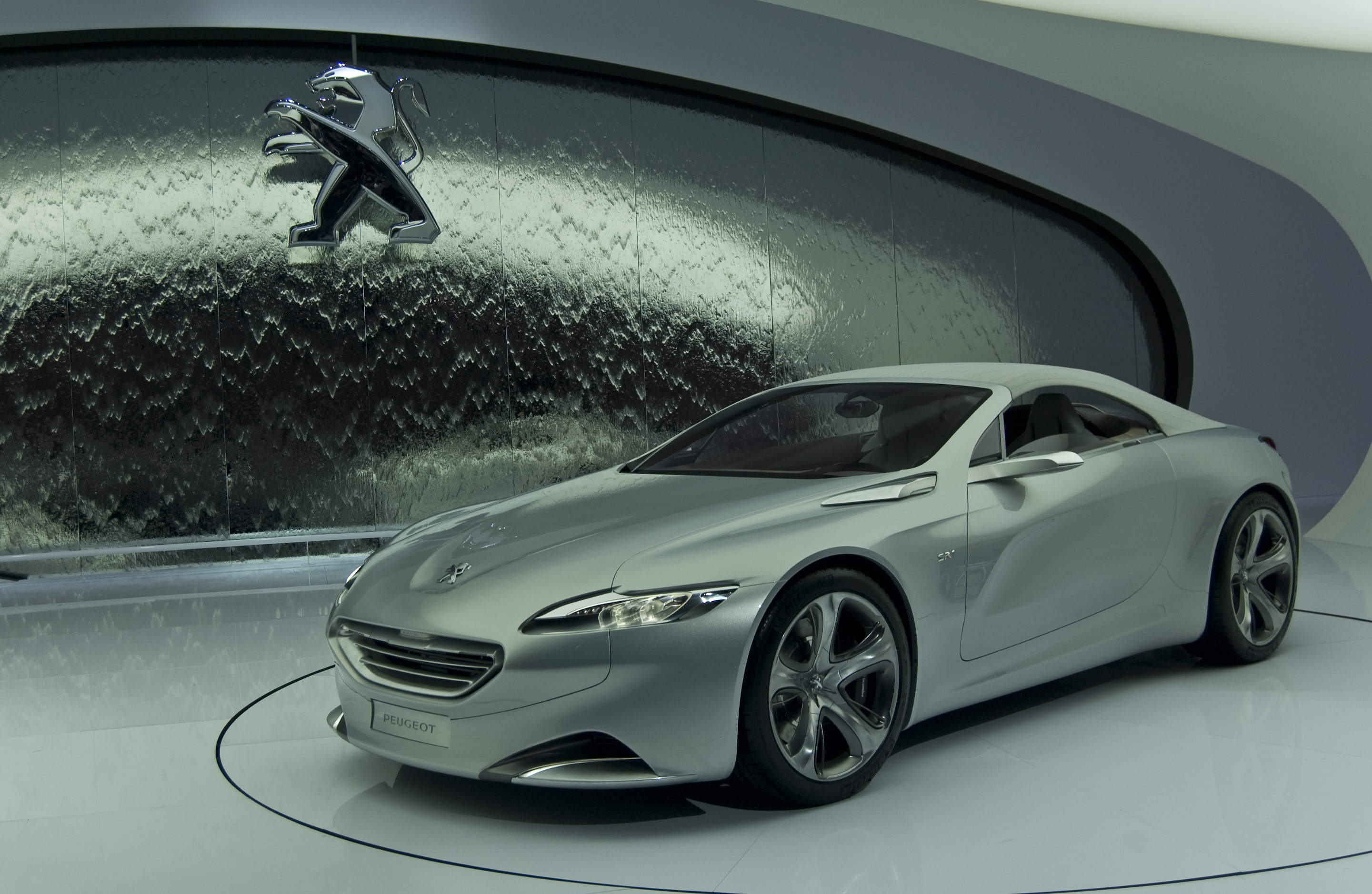
Peugeot SR1 concept

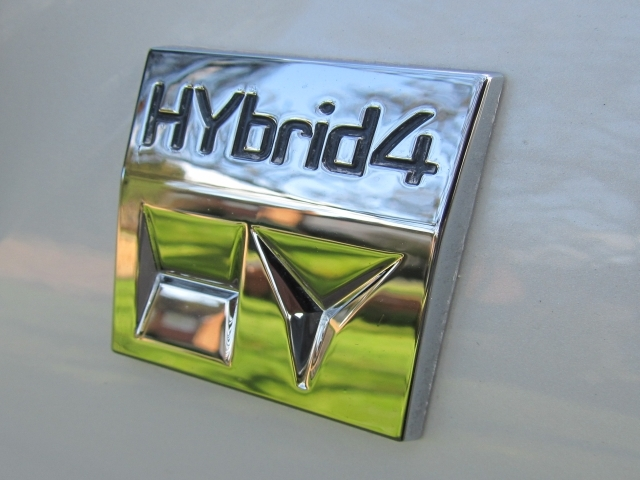
Hybrid4

=== Production ===
- 2011–2016 Peugeot 3008 HYbrid4
- 2012–2016 Peugeot 508 RXH HYbrid4
- 2012–2016 Peugeot 508 HYbrid4
- 2012–2016 Citroën DS5 HYbrid4

=== Concept ===
- 2008 Peugeot RC HYbrid4
- 2009 Peugeot RCZ HYbrid4 concept
- 2010 Peugeot HR1 (petrol engine)
- 2010 Peugeot SR1
- 2011 Peugeot HX1
