= Kia Pop =

Kia POP
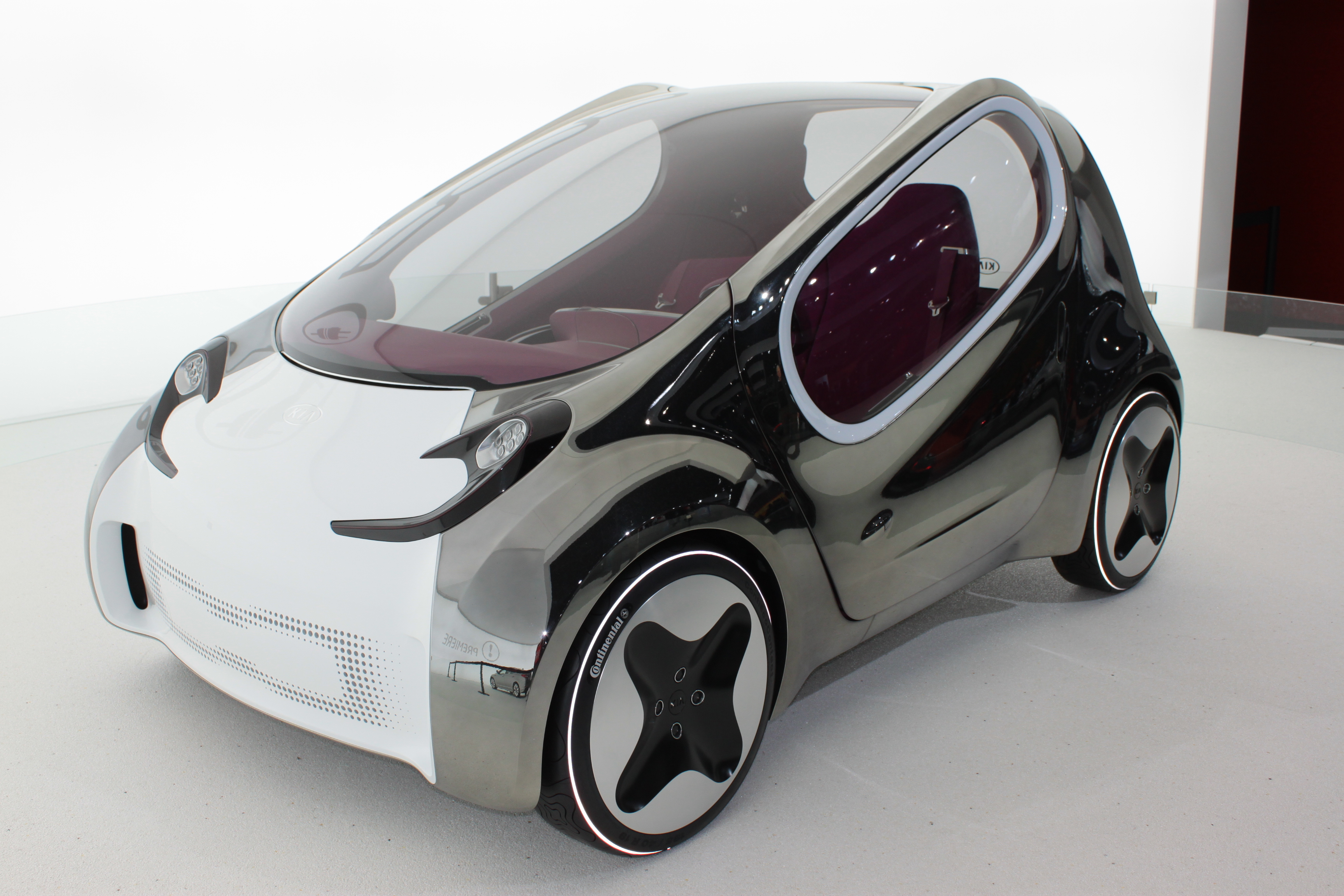

Overview
- Manufacturer: Kia
- Production: 2010

Body and chassis
- Body style: 2-door
- Doors: Butterfly

Powertrain
- Engine: Electric motor

The Kia POP is an electric concept car presented by Kia Motors at the 2010 Paris Motor Show. It was developed by the South Korean brand's European Design Centre, located in Frankfurt, Germany, and represents the designers' vision of the future of urban electric transport.

== Design ==
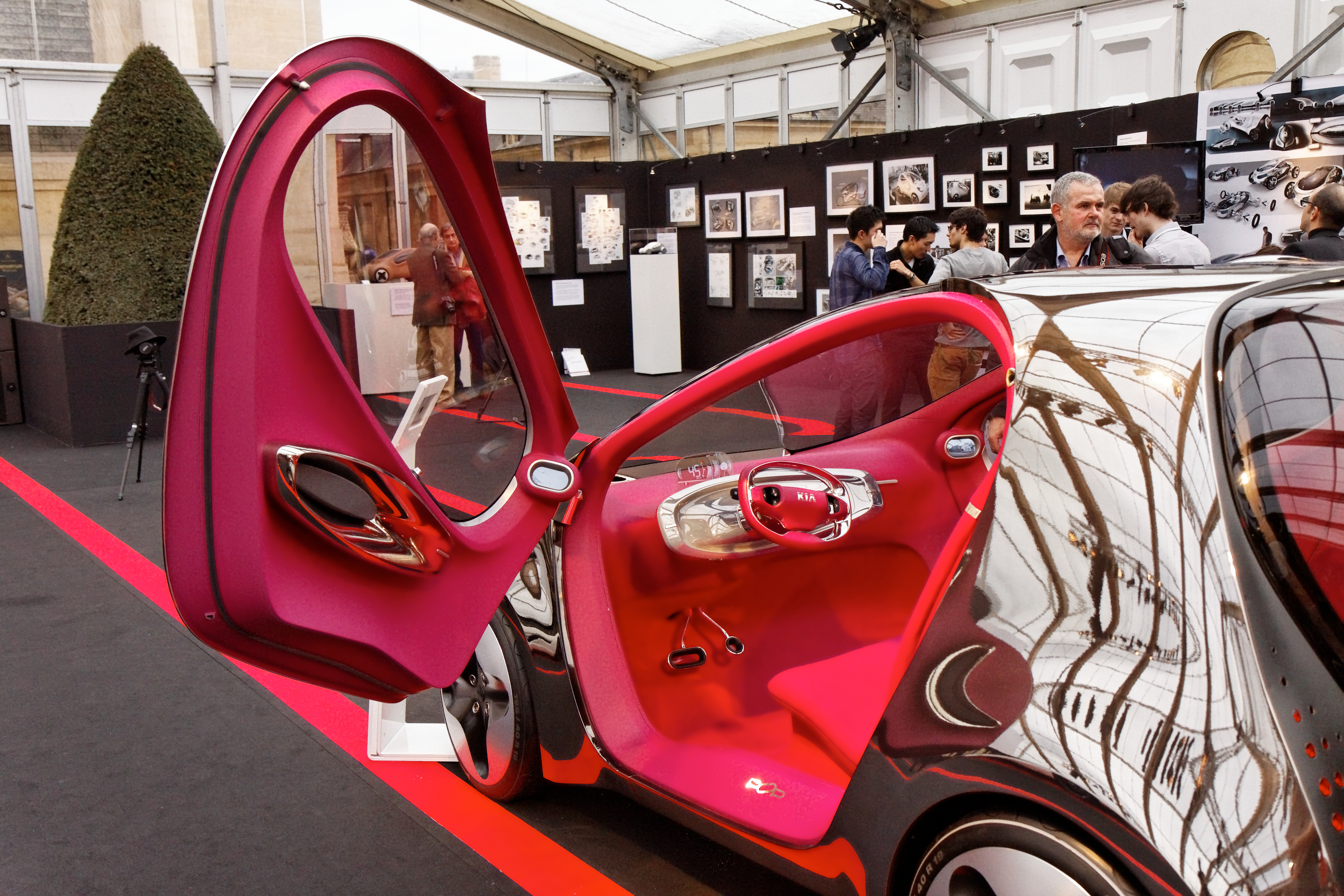
View with the door open, showing the interior

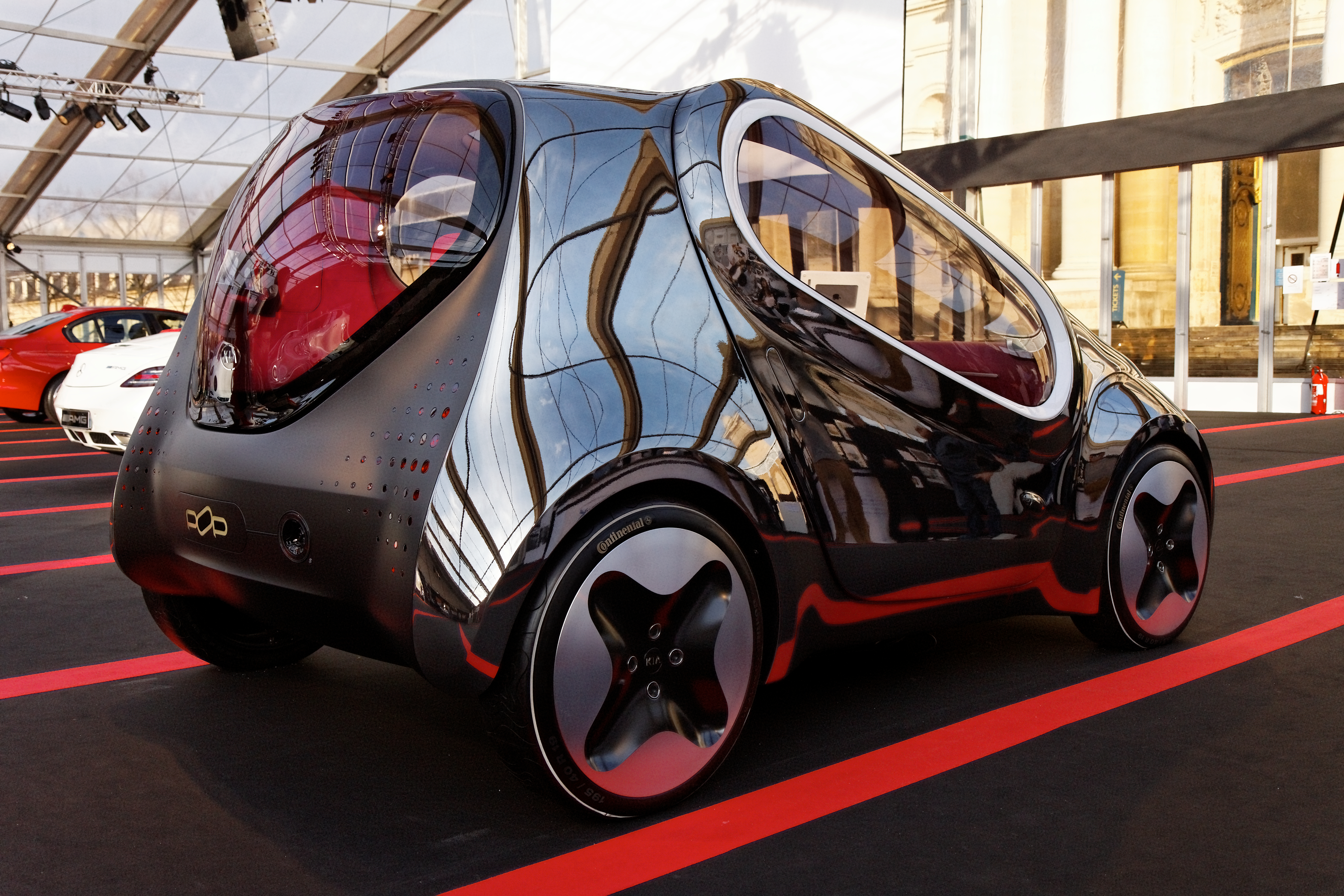
Rear view

The 3 metres (9.8 ft) concept car had chrome colouring, three seats, oblong-shaped side windows, and front-hinged doors. The design team says that to create the concept, inspiration was drawn from several different areas rather than the automotive world, in order to break boundaries. The POP has an interior purple colour that was chosen to express a calm and peaceful environment. It was inspired by a picture of a space shuttle.

== Motor and battery ==
The Kia POP concept is powered by an electric engine with a power output of 50 kW and 190 Nm of torque. It can run on a single charge for about 160 kilometres (99 mi), with its power being supplied by compact lithium polymer gel batteries. It has an electric drivetrain.
