= Peugeot HR1 =

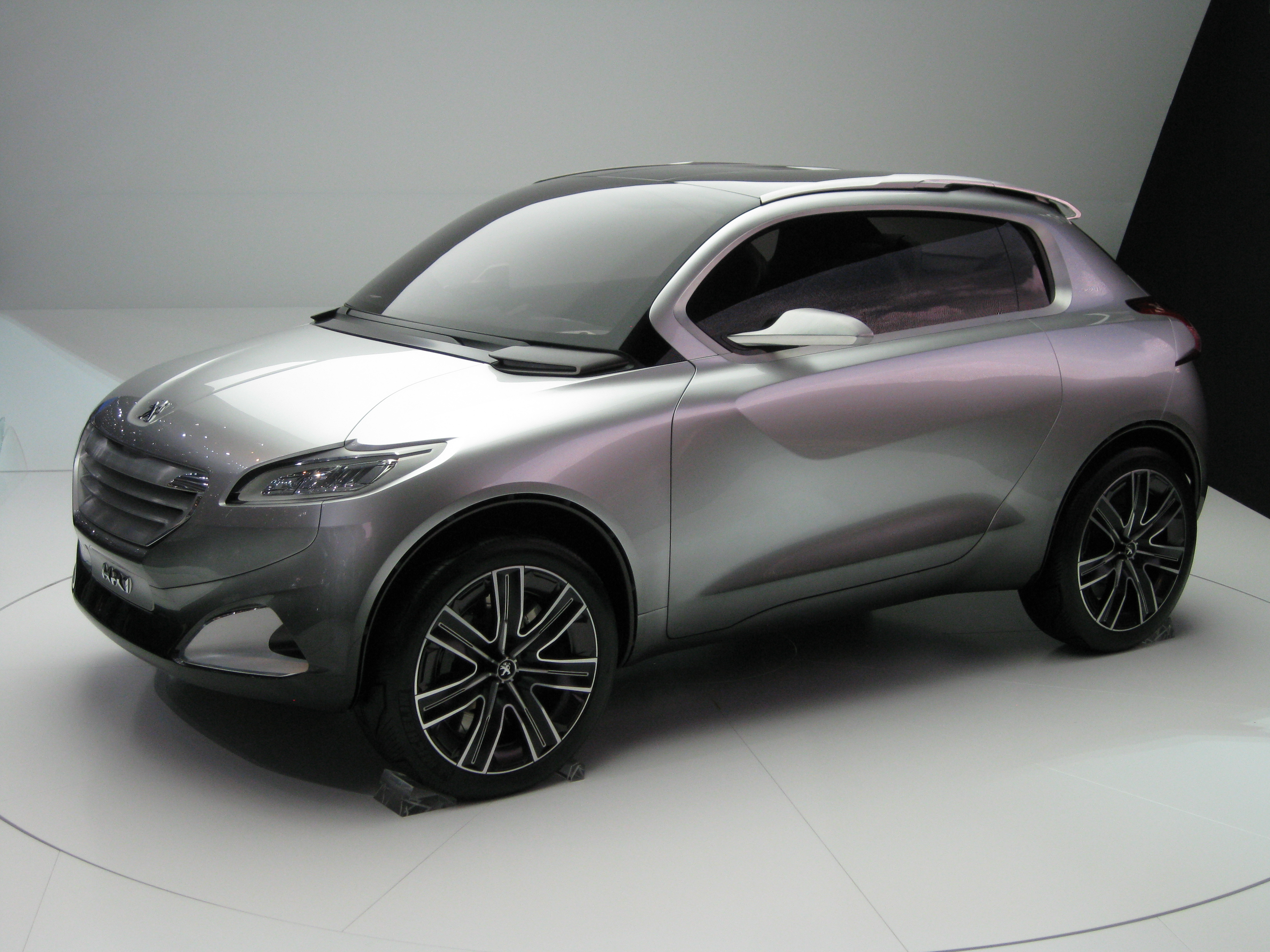

Overview
- Manufacturer: Peugeot
- Production: 2010 (concept car)

Body and chassis
- Body style: Supermini SUV

Powertrain
- Engine: Peugeot HYbrid4 Technology (with the 1.2-litre petrol engine)

Dimensions
- Length: 3.67m

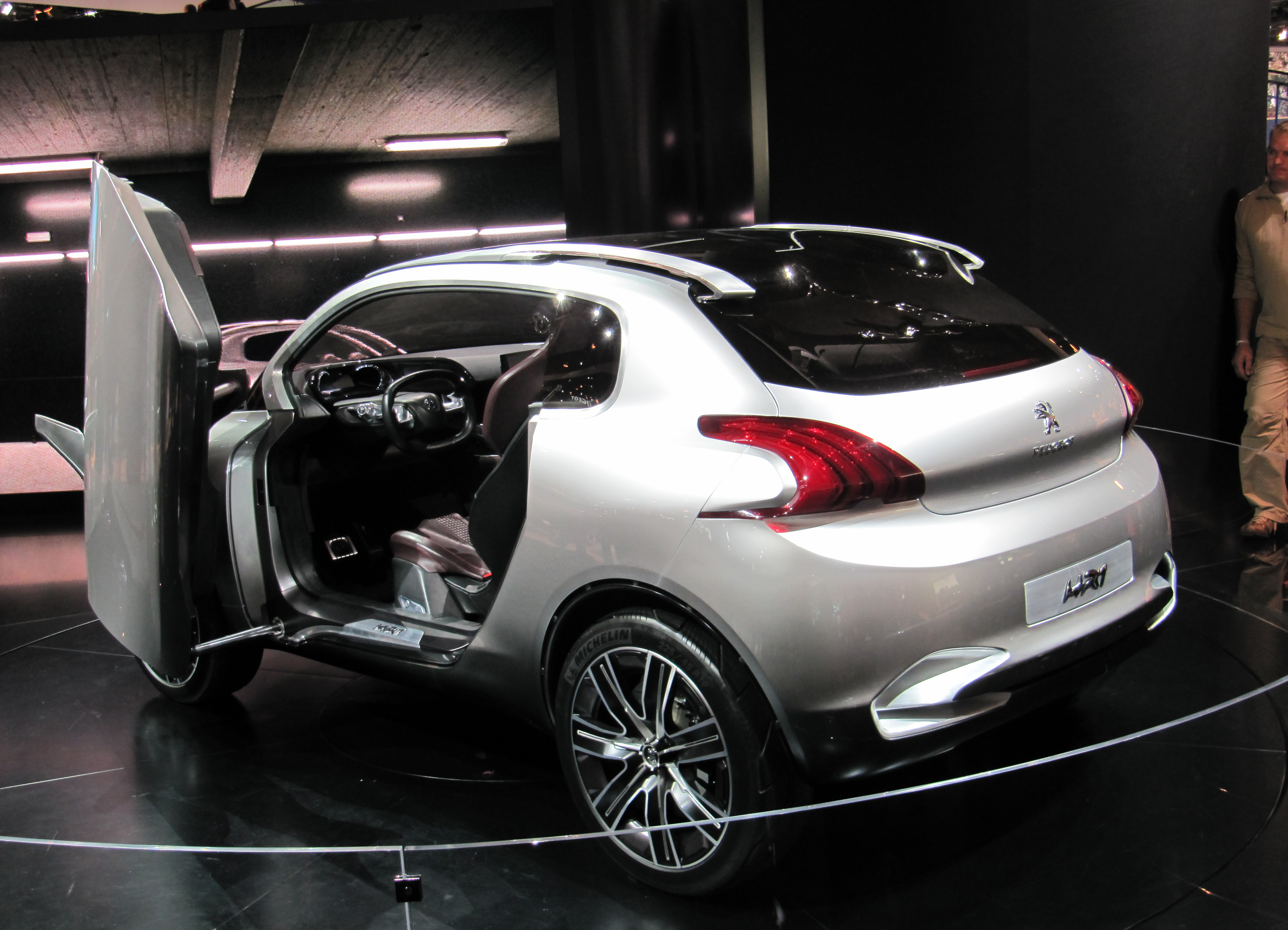
Rear view with door open

The Peugeot HR1 is a concept car that was designed by Peugeot for the 2010 Paris Motor Show. It is a supermini SUV and features an innovative hybrid powertrain. Instead of using a diesel linked to an electric motor like in the Peugeot 3008 and Peugeot 508, it uses a 1.2-litre petrol engine. CAR compared the car’s styling being “sort of like the shrunken Range Rover Evoque.”

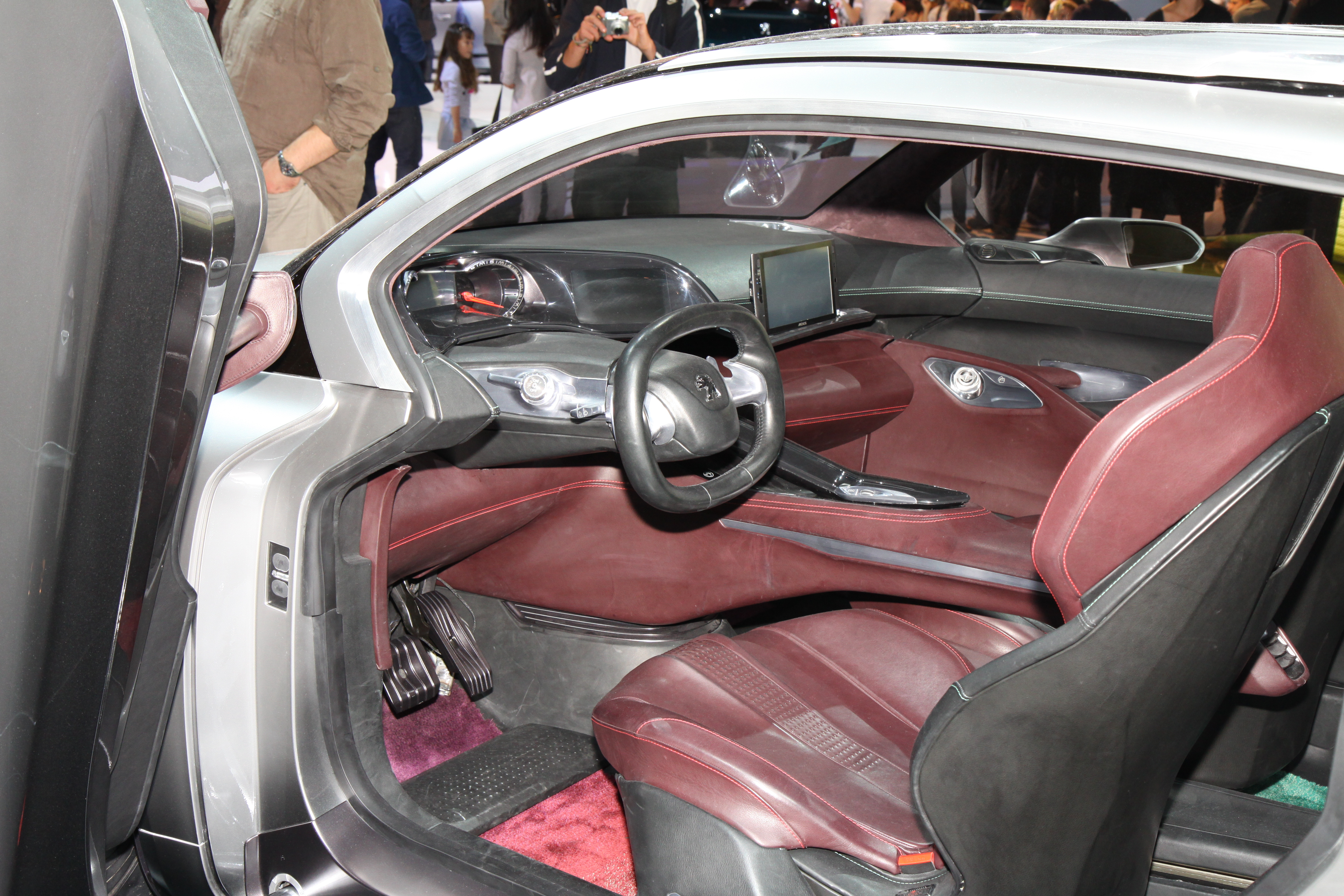
Interior

Design elements from the car were later used in the Peugeot 2008, which went into production in April 2013. The concept is 3.67 m (12.0 ft) long; shorter than the Nissan Juke but longer than the Citroën Lacoste. The Lacoste is the HR1’s sister car, and is also a hybrid. The vehicle was also displayed at the 2011 Geneva Motor Show, having been announced the previous month.
