= CT&T United =

Korean manufacturer of electric vehicles

- Type: Private
- Industry: Automotive
- Founded: 2002; 24 years ago
- Headquarters: South Korea
- Key people: Young Gi Lee, CT&T President & CEO; Joseph J. White, CT&T United COO
- Products: eZone & cZone
- Website: Homepage

CT&T United (Korean: 씨티엔티) is a manufacturer of battery electric vehicles including the eZone Medium Speed Vehicle and cZone low-speed vehicle based in South Korea. The CT&T eZone is the only electric vehicle of its type to pass the international crash test for passenger vehicles.

== American assembly ==
CT&T United plans a "Regional Assembly and Sales" system, in which regional joint ventures in the United States would assemble cars in small factories. On September 28, 2009 Governor of Pennsylvania Ed Rendell announced the first two such sites would be in Pennsylvania. On May 7, 2010, the company and Governor of Hawaii Linda Lingle announced they would build a plant on the island of Oahu to manufacture up to 10,000 vehicles a year.

None of the plans listed above ever finalized. While the CT&T AMERICA, INC. has been registered with NHTSA as a Low Speed Vehicle Manufacturer, they only sold few vehicles in 2009 and the company went out of business in 2015. CT&T never received the required EO (Executive Order) from CARB (California Air Resources Board) so the cars were not legal for sale in California.

== Distributing in Japan ==
e-Zone is imported by Autorex, distributed by NAFCA (Nippon Automobile Fair Certificate Association). In Japan, eZone is classified under Kei car.

- Autorex corp.(Japanese)
- NAFCA e-Zone website(Japanese)

== Model gallery ==
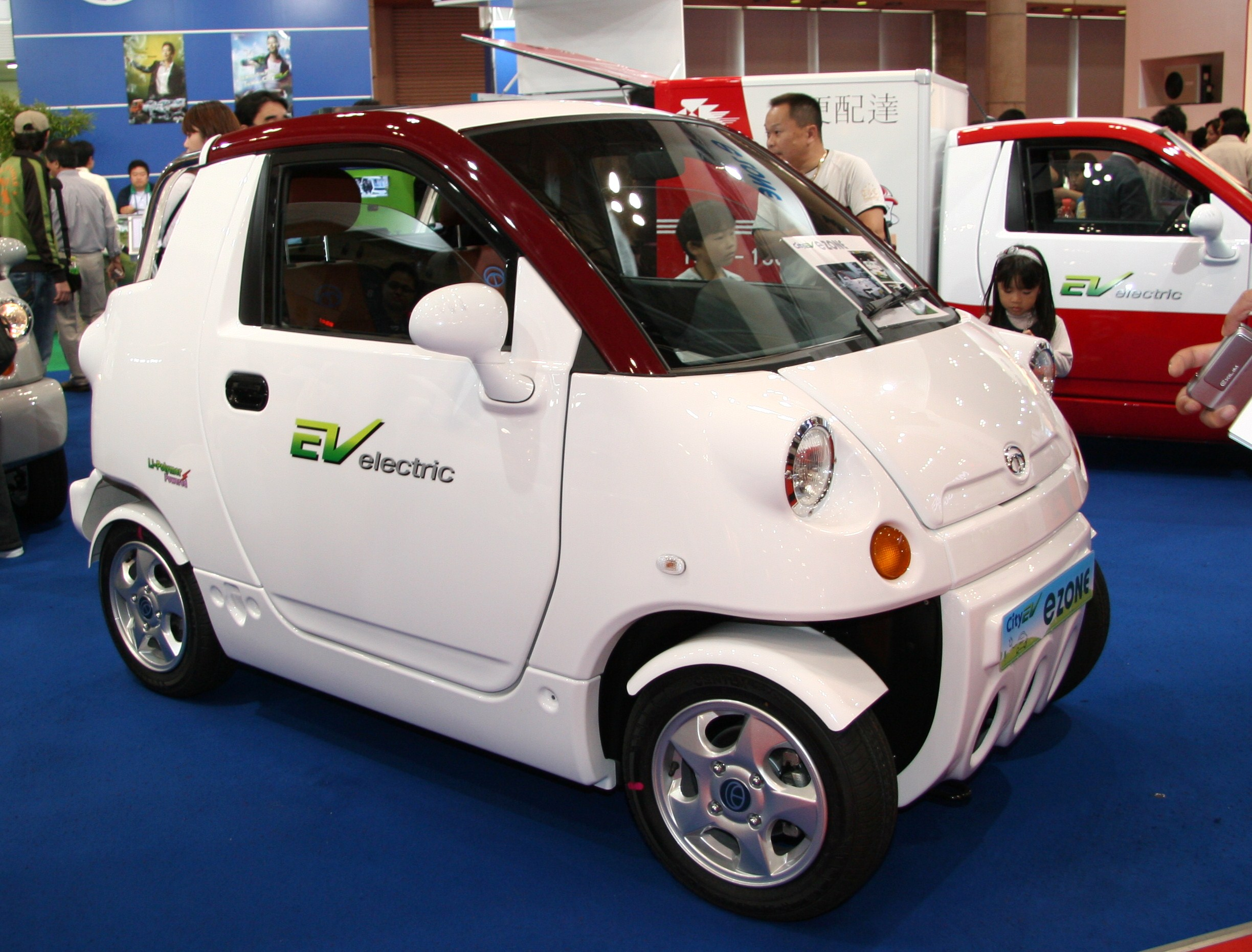
CT&T eZONE.

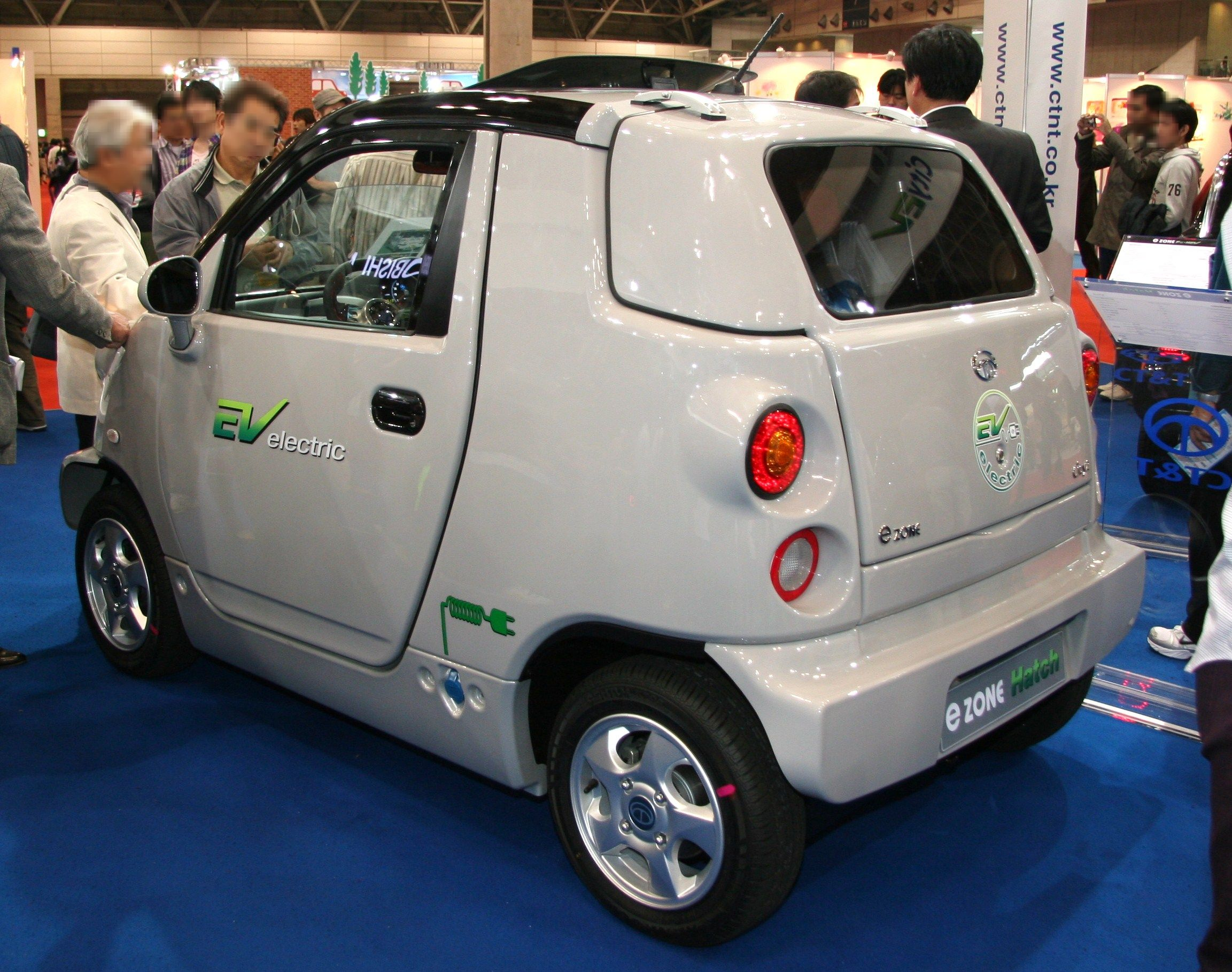
CT&T eZONE Plus.

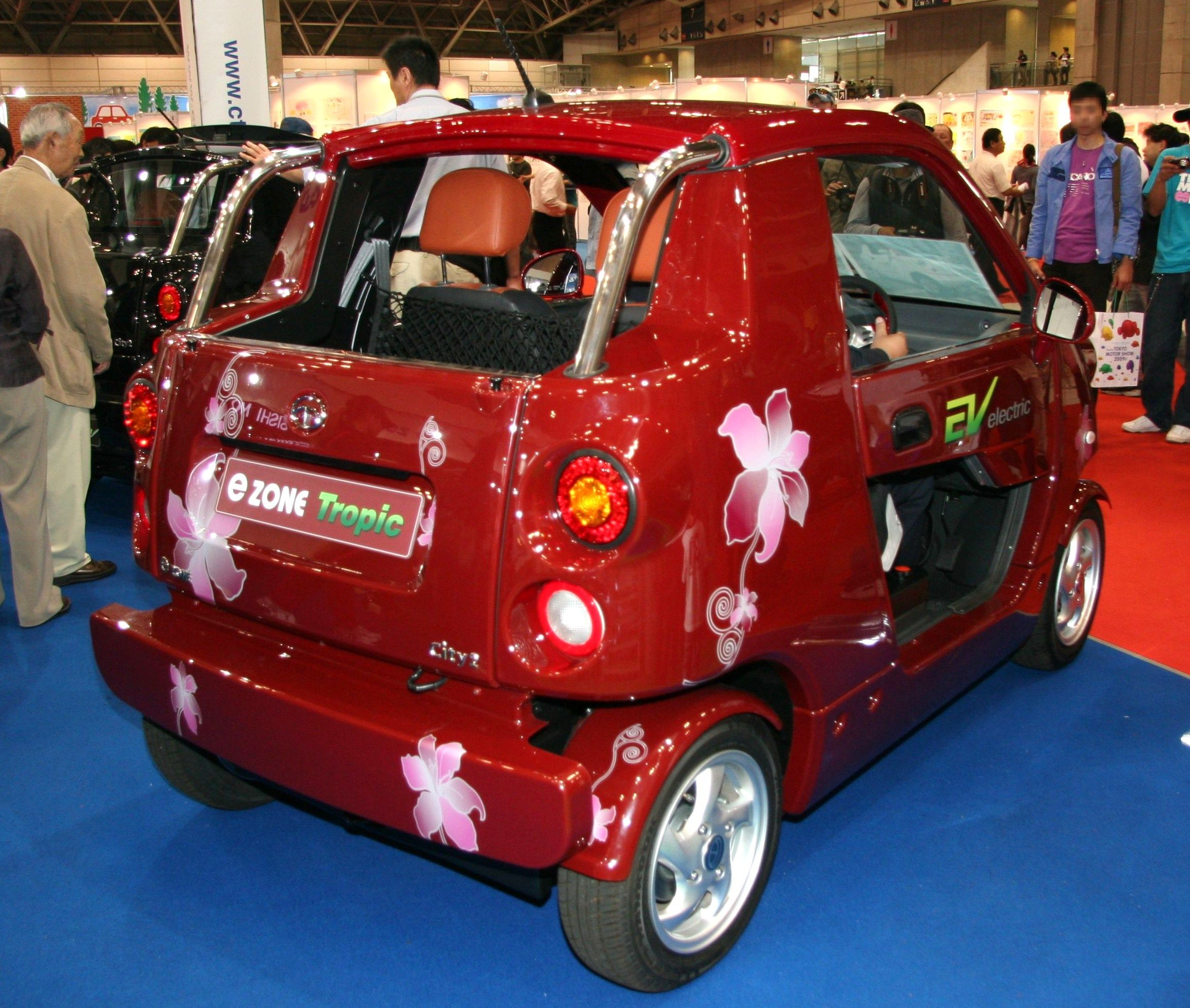
CT&T eZONE Tropic.

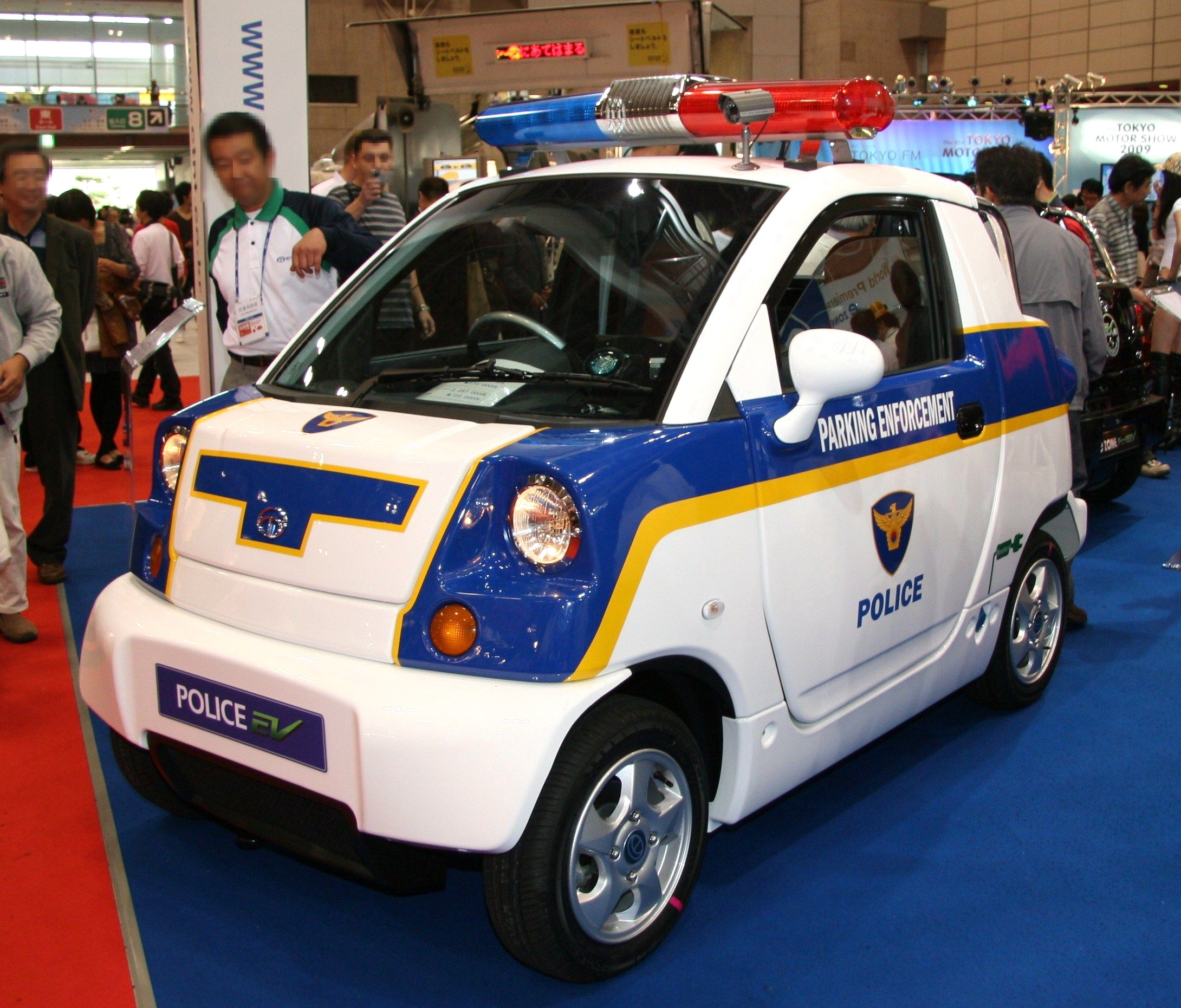
CT&T Police EV.

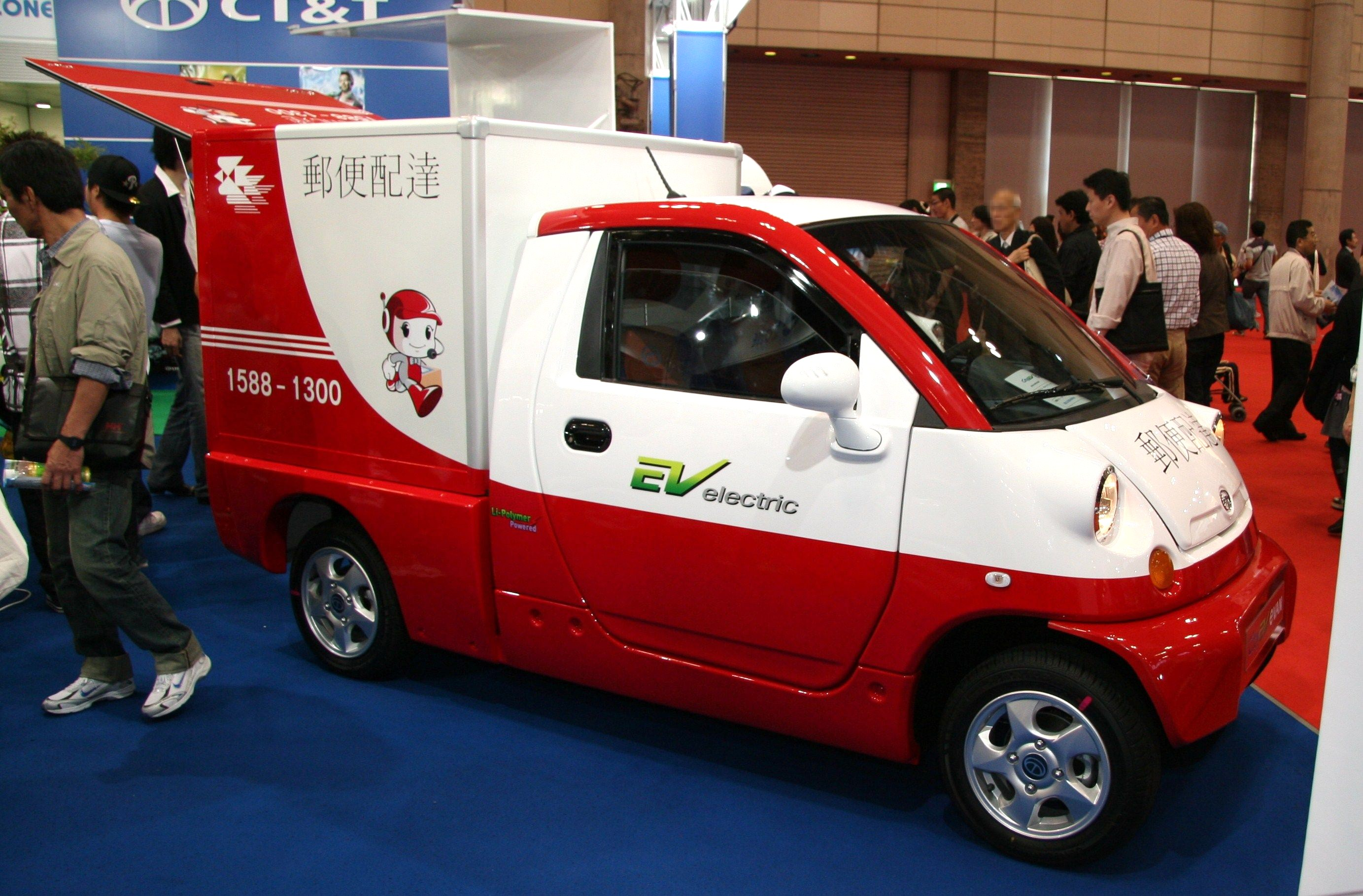
CT&T eVAN.

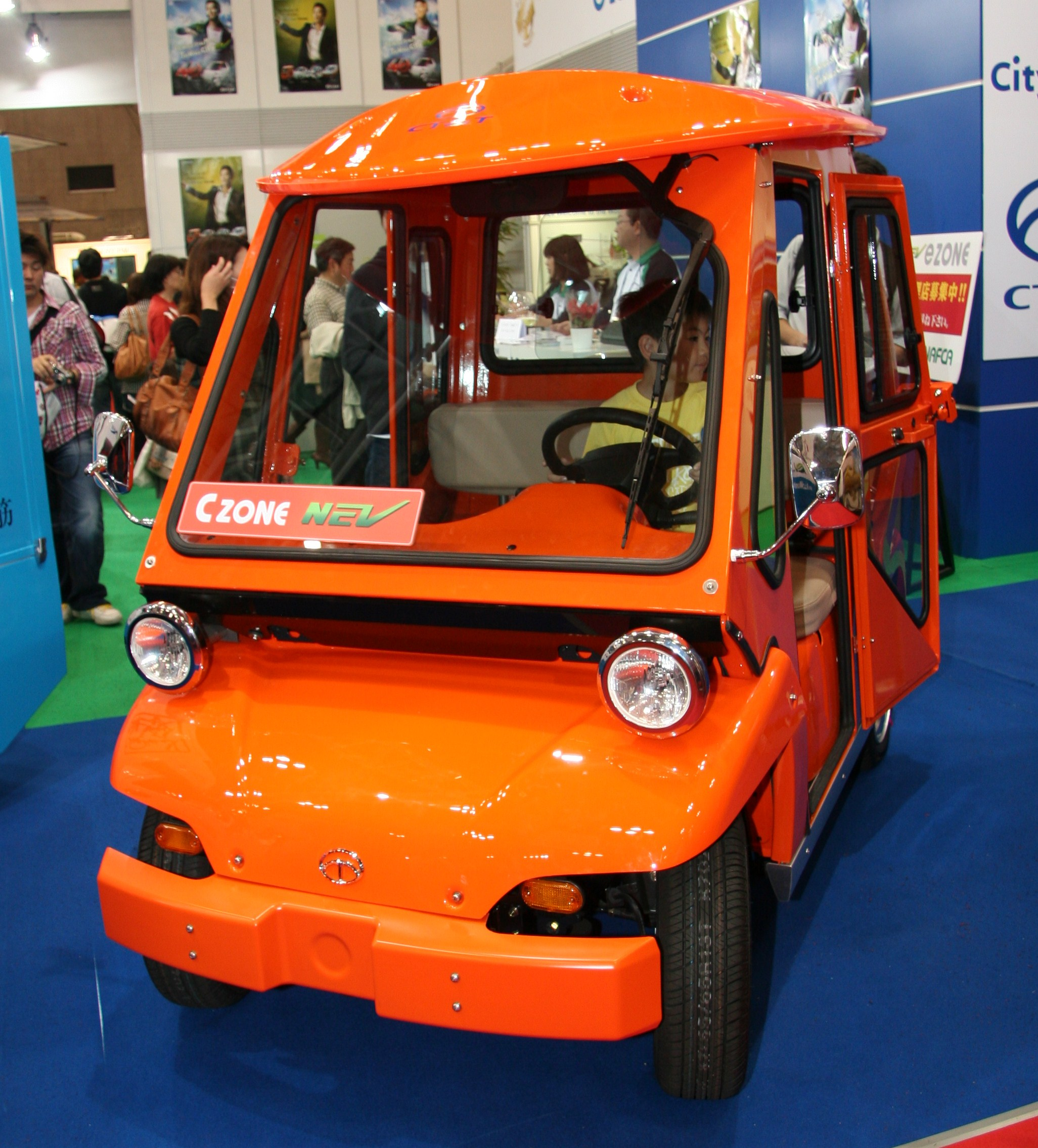
CT&T cZONE.
