= HD 3 =

Star in the constellation Andromeda

- Location of HD 3 (circled in red)

Observation data Epoch J2000 Equinox J2000
- Constellation: Andromeda
- Right ascension: 00^{h} 05^{m} 09.75827^{s}
- Declination: +45° 13′ 44.5108″
- Apparent magnitude (V): 6.71

Characteristics
- Evolutionary stage: Main sequence
- Spectral type: A1 Vn
- B−V color index: 0.06

Astrometry

A
Radial velocity (R_{v})	−10.52±0.53 km/s
Proper motion (μ)	RA: −27.768(60) mas/yr Dec.: −20.062(54) mas/yr
Parallax (π)	6.3137±0.0826 mas
Distance	517 ± 7 ly (158 ± 2 pc)
Absolute magnitude (M_{V})	+1.02

C
Radial velocity (R_{v})	−12.18±0.36 km/s
Proper motion (μ)	RA: −27.911±0.012 mas/yr Dec.: −19.280±0.013 mas/yr
Parallax (π)	6.3606±0.0148 mas
Distance	513 ± 1 ly (157.2 ± 0.4 pc)

Details

A
Mass	2.38 ± 0.08 M_{☉}
Radius	3.0 R_{☉}
Luminosity	43.5+7.9 −6.7 L_{☉}
Surface gravity (log g)	3.86 cgs
Temperature	9,057+169 −185 K
Rotational velocity (v sin i)	228 km/s
Age	407 Myr

C
Mass	1.054+0.039 −0.038 M_{☉}
Radius	0.93+0.97 −0.26 R_{☉}
Luminosity	0.92+0.78 −0.67 L_{☉}
Surface gravity (log g)	4.50+0.93 −0.22 cgs
Temperature	5,828+928 −121 K
Metallicity [Fe/H]	0.04±0.01 dex

Other designations
- BD+44°4550, FK5 4009, HD 3, HIP 424, HR 1, SAO 36042, WDS J00052+4514A

Database references
SIMBAD	data

HD 3 is a single, white-hued star in the northern constellation Andromeda. With an apparent visual magnitude of 6.71, it is below the nominal brightness limit for visibility with the typical naked eye but may still be visible by some observers under ideal viewing conditions. It is also the first star indexed in the Bright Star Catalogue. Based upon an annual parallax shift of 6.3137±0.0826 mas, it is located roughly 517 light-years away. The star is moving closer with a heliocentric radial velocity of −11 km/s, and will make perihelion in around 2.9 million years at a separation of around 351 ly (107.71 pc).

The stellar classification of this star is A1 Vn, indicating it is an A-type main-sequence star with "nebulous" lines due to rapid rotation. It is a Lambda Boötis candidate star, being classified as chemically-peculiar by Abt & Morrell (1995). Murphy et al. (2015) list the membership likelihood as uncertain. HD 3 has 2.36 times the mass of the Sun and about 1.9 times the Sun's radius. It is spinning with a projected rotational velocity of 228 km/s. The star is radiating around 43.5 times the Sun's luminosity from its photosphere at an effective temperature of about 9,057 K.

HD 3 has two visual companions. Component B is a magnitude 13.70 star at an angular separation of 16″ along a position angle (PA) of 107°, as of 2016. The third star, component C, is magnitude 10.58 and lies at a separation of 21″ along a PA of 235°, also as of 2016. Gaia DR3 shows a parallax and proper motion for component C similar to that of the primary, suggesting that it may be gravitationally bound.
