= Comarth =

Spanish car company

- Industry: Automotive
- Founded: 1999
- Headquarters: San José de la Vega, Murcia, Spain
- Products: Electric vehicles
- Website: www.comarth-ev.com

Comarth is a company based in San José de la Vega, Murcia, Spain, which specializes in the construction of electric cars. It was founded by José Antonio Martínez Marín in 1999.

== History ==
Comarth began with the manufacture of two sports road models, both powered by original Ford engines, initially with:

- Comarth S1, 26 units.
- Comarth Xtamy, 5 units.

Subsequently, due to the higher profitability of electric vehicles, it focused solely on the manufacture of small vehicles powered by electric power, such as small urban vehicles, maintenance vehicles and golf carts, which was later expanded in 2014 to buses (T-Bus) and trucks (T-Trucks) with batteries with different charge cycles.

At this time, the ownership of this company is divided between its founder, who holds 13% of the shareholding, a French investor, Demeter Partners, who accumulates 49% of the company's shares, and the Mondragón Corporation since November 2013 with the remaining 38%. The company currently has commercial interests in Spain, France and Norway and a global network of distributors on all continents.

== Production ==
Comarth's range is made up of:

- Comarth Cross Rider
- Comarth CR Sport
- Comarth S1
- Comarth Toy Rider
- Comarth T-Truck
- Comarth T-Bus
- Comarth Xtamy

== Motorsport ==
In its 2003 edition of the Dakar Rally, Comarth presented a modified S1, which was specially designed to take part in the rally raids. It was piloted by Antonio Ramos Martínez.
