= H.R. 1 =

H.R. 1 (short for House of Representatives 1) is an identifier for a bill of the United States House of Representatives. Historically, H.R. 1 indicated the first bill introduced in a given Congress (as the numbering system restarts every two years with each new Congress). However, since the start of the 106th Congress in 1999, each Congress's rules have called for reserving numbers 1 through 10 for assignment by the Speaker of the House.

== Notable examples ==
Title	Congress introduced	Outcome	Description
Gold Standard Act of 1900	56th	Enacted as Pub. L. 56–41	Established the gold standard as the only currency standard in the United States, ending bimetalism with silver.
Agricultural Marketing Act of 1929	71st	Enacted as Pub. L. 71–10	Established the Federal Farm Board.
Ethics in Government Act of 1978	95th	Related bill, S. 555, enacted as Pub. L. 95–521	Increased government transparency in the wake of the Watergate scandal.
Family and Medical Leave Act of 1993	103rd	Enacted as Pub. L. 103–3	Requires employers to grant unpaid leave for family and medical reasons.
Congressional Accountability Act of 1995	104th	Related bill, S. 2, enacted as Pub. L. 104–1 (text) (PDF), the first bill passed by the Congress.	Extends certain workers' rights laws to Congress.
No Child Left Behind Act of 2001	107th	Enacted as Pub. L. 107–110 (text) (PDF). Replaced in 2015 by the Every Student Succeeds Act.	Implemented nationwide standards-based education reform.
Medicare Prescription Drug, Improvement, and Modernization Act of 2003	108th	Enacted as Pub. L. 108–173 (text) (PDF)	Overhauled Medicare.
Implementing Recommendations of the 9/11 Commission Act of 2007	110th	Enacted as Pub. L. 110–53 (text) (PDF)	Implemented some of the reforms recommended by the 9/11 Commission.
American Recovery and Reinvestment Act of 2009	111th	Enacted as Pub. L. 111–5 (text) (PDF)	Stimulus package in response to the Great Recession.
Office of Compliance Administrative and Technical Corrections Act of 2015	114th	Enacted as Pub. L. 114–6 (text) (PDF)	Amendment to the Congressional Accountability Act of 1995, also an H.R. 1.
Tax Cuts and Jobs Act of 2017	115th	Enacted as Pub. L. 115–97 (text) (PDF)	Reduced tax rates for businesses and individuals.
For the People Act	116th (2019)	Passed the House. Never brought to a vote in the Senate.	Would reform voting law, campaign finance law, and ethics rules for federal officials.
For the People Act	117th (2021)	Passed the House. Filibustered in the Senate.	Would reform voting law, campaign finance law, and ethics rules for federal officials.
Lower Energy Costs Act	118th	Passed the House. Never brought to a vote in the Senate.	
One Big Beautiful Bill Act	119th	Enacted as Pub. L. 119–21 (text) (PDF)	Reduced tax rates for businesses and individuals.
