= Citroën Lacoste =

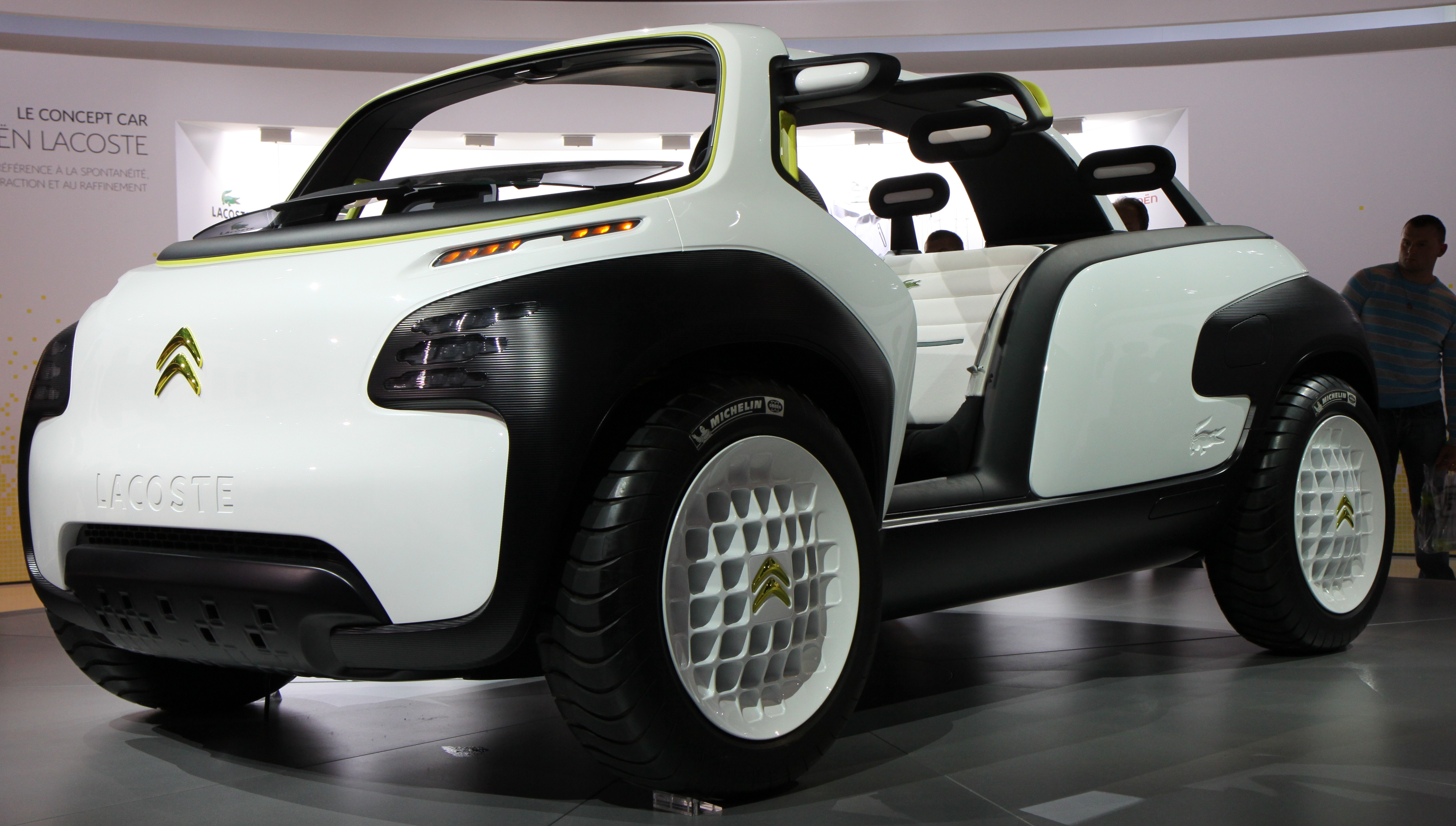

Overview
- Manufacturer: Citroën and Lacoste
- Production: 2010
- Designer: Céline Venet (exterior); Nicolas Gonzalez (interior)

Body and chassis
- Class: Concept car
- Body style: no door crossover
- Layout: FF

Powertrain
- Engine: 1.2 L 3-cylinder (petrol)
- Transmission: 5-speed manual

Dimensions
- Wheelbase: 2.3 m (91 in)
- Length: 3.45 m (136 in)
- Width: 1.8 m (71 in)
- Height: 1.52 m (60 in)

Chronology
- Successor: Citroën C3 Aircross; Citroën C4 Aircross; Citroën C4 Cactus

The Citroën Lacoste is a concept mini SUV designed by Citroën and Lacoste for the 2010 Paris Motor Show. It is an economical, no-door mini SUV, featuring a 1.2-litre petrol engine emitting fewer than 100g/km of CO_{2}. It was expected to enter production by 2013, but for undisclosed reasons this did not happen.

== Design and features ==
The vehicle is 3.45 metres (11.3 ft) long, around 0.5 metres shorter than the Nissan Juke. It has special features, including an inflatable roof that emerges from the centre roof rail. It also has a movable steering wheel to improve access. The vehicle has no doors. This concept was inspired by the Citroën Méhari of the 1970s, and the 2007 Citroën C-Cactus concept car.

== Gallery ==
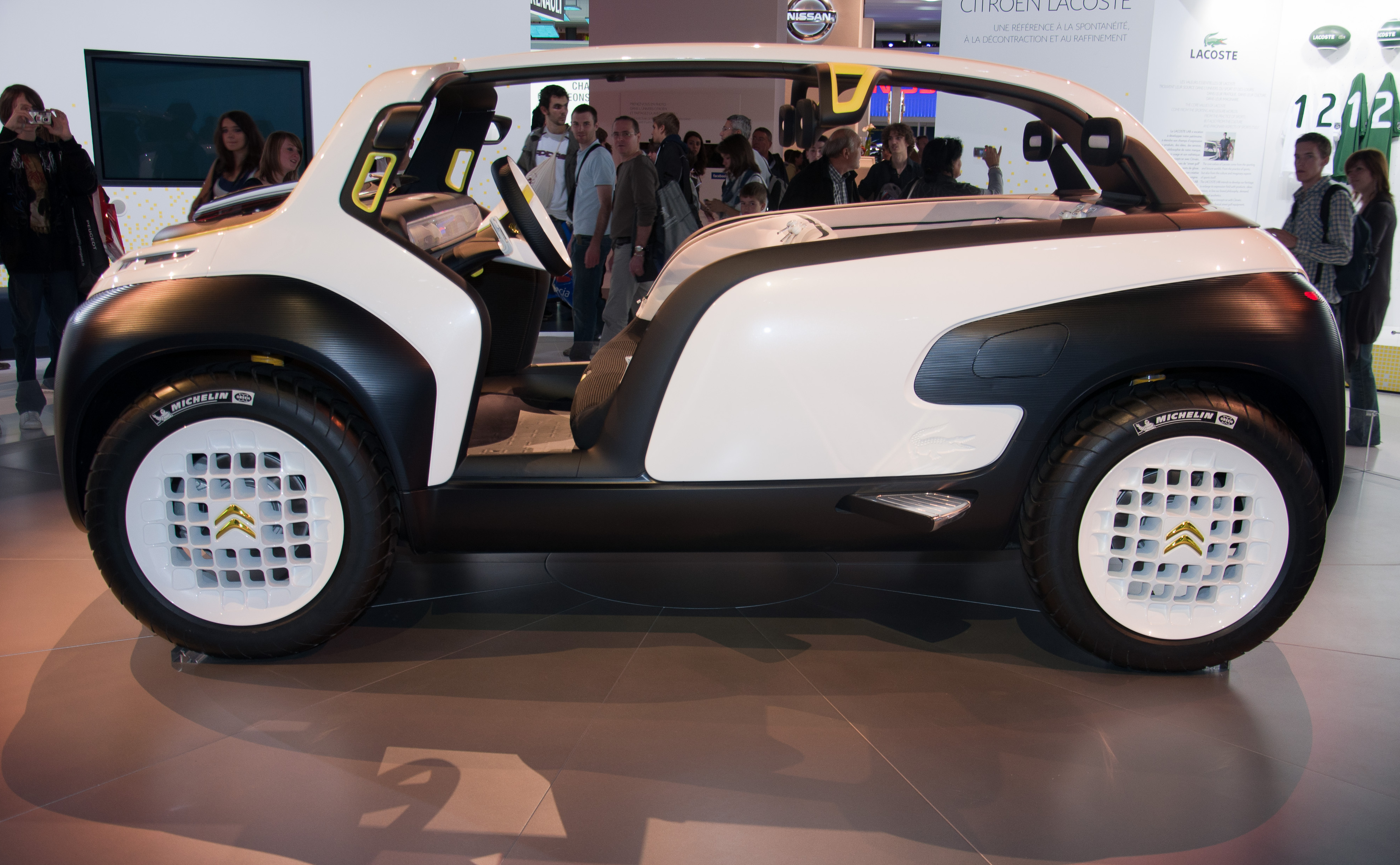
Side view

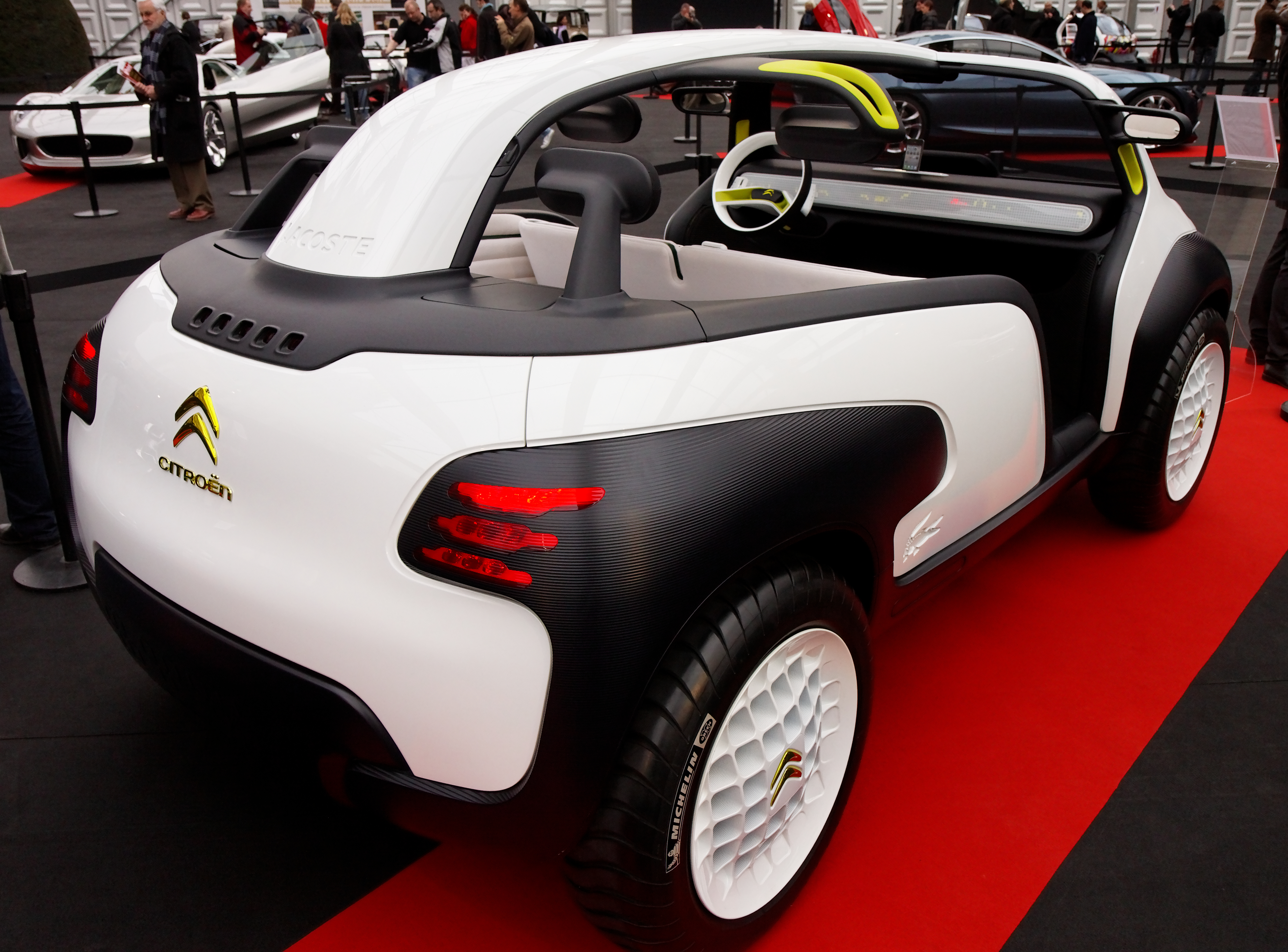
Rear ¾ view

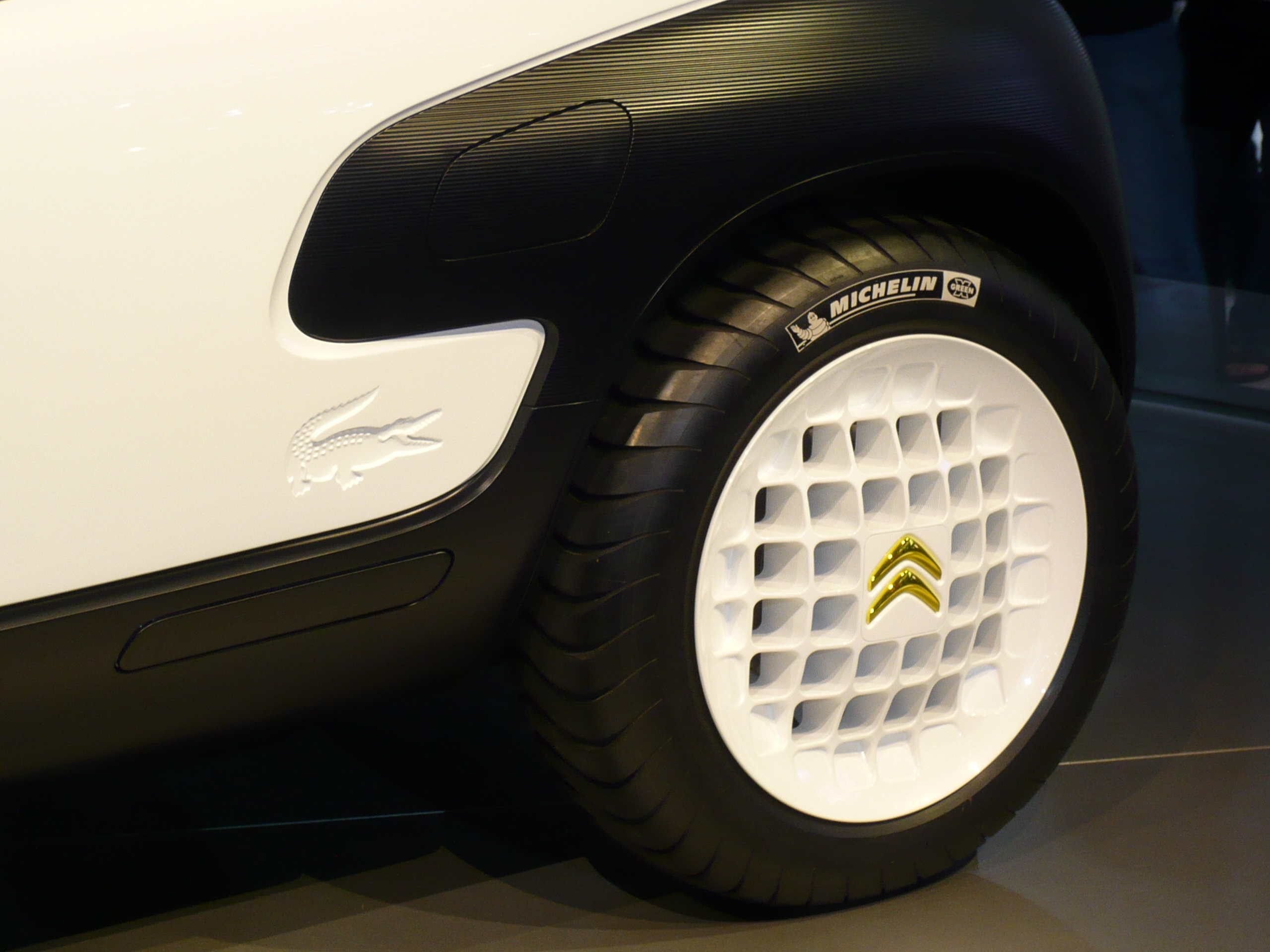

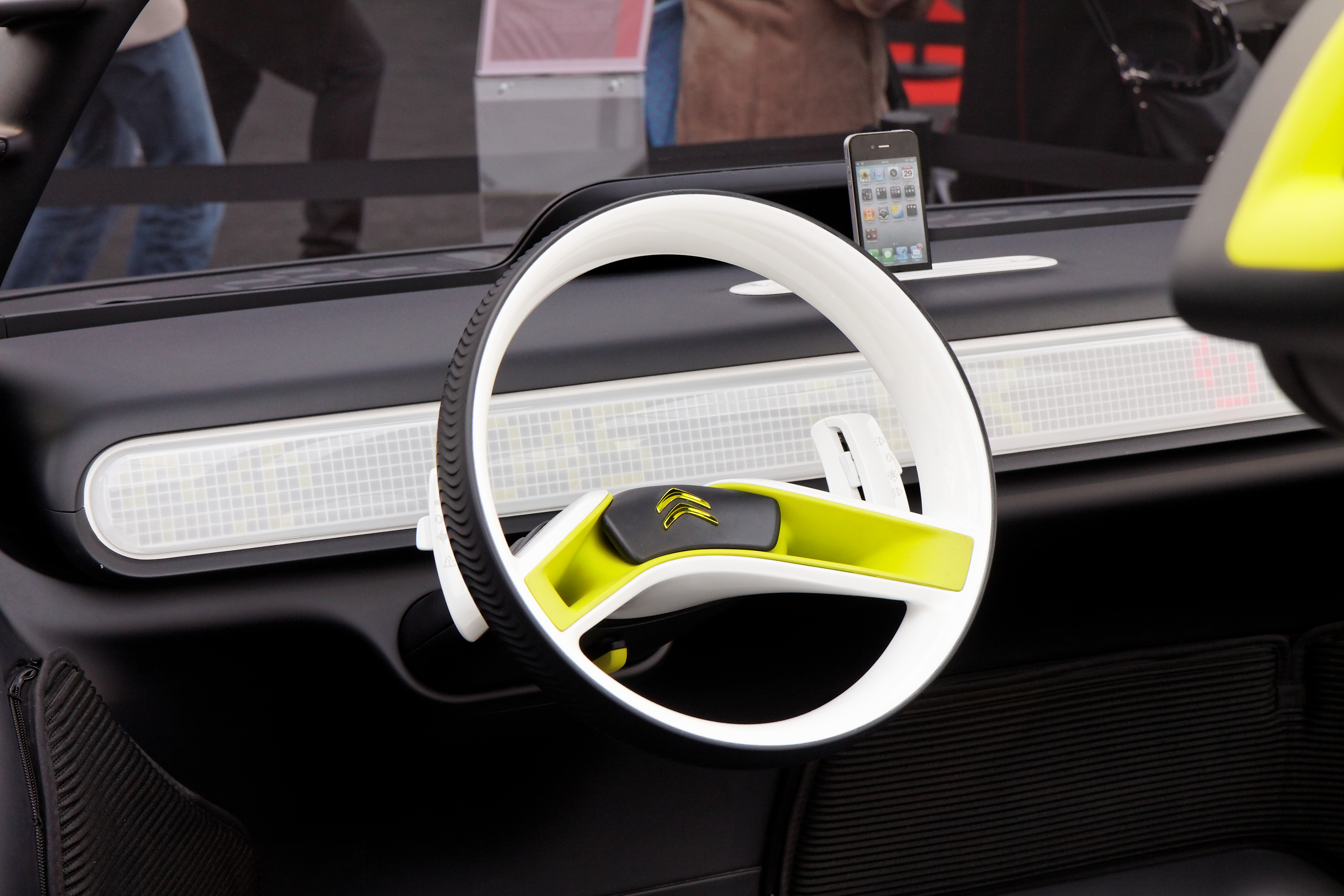
Interior
