= List of Nio vehicles =

Nio Inc. is a Chinese multinational automobile manufacturer headquartered in Shanghai, specializing in designing and developing electric vehicles.

The following is a list of vehicles produced by Nio, including vehicles that are marketed under the Onvo and Firefly brands.

== Current vehicles ==
=== Nio ===
Photo	Name	Chinese name	Generation	Specifications
Sedan
	ET9	蔚来ET9	First	Body style: fastback sedan; Class: Full-size (F); Doors: 4; Seats: 4 or 5; Production: 2025–present; Range:
	ET7	蔚来ET7	First	Body style: Sedan; Class: Full-size (E); Doors: 4; Seats: 5; Production: 2022–present; Range: 500 to 1,000 km (310 to 620 mi) (NEDC)
	ET5	蔚来ET5	First	Body style: Sedan; Class: Mid-size (D); Doors: 4; Seats: 5; Production: 2022–present; Range: 635 kilometres (395 mi) (CLTC)
Station wagon
	ET5T	蔚来ET5T	First	Body style: Station wagon; Class: Mid-size (D); Doors: 5; Seats: 5; Production: 2023–present; Range: 1,010 km (630 mi) (CLTC) with 150 kWh battery
SUV
	ES9	蔚来ES9	First	Body style: SUV; Class: Full-size; Doors: 5; Seats: 6 or 7; Production: 2026–present; Range:
	ES8	蔚来ES8	Third	Body style: SUV; Class: Full-size; Doors: 5; Seats: 6 or 7; Production: 2018–present; Range: 635 km (395 mi) (CLTC)
	ES7	蔚来ES7	First	Body style: SUV; Class: Mid-size; Doors: 5; Seats: 5; Production: 2022–present; Range: 485 km (301 mi) (NEDC) with 75 kWh battery
	ES6	蔚来ES6	Second	Body style: SUV; Class: Mid-size; Doors: 5; Seats: 5; Production: 2019–present; Range: 610 km (380 mi) (NEDC)
	EC7	蔚来EC7	First	Body style: Coupe SUV; Class: Mid-size; Doors: 5; Seats: 5; Production: 2023–present; Range: 940 km (580 mi) (NEDC) with 150 kWh battery
	EC6	蔚来EC6	Second	Body style: Coupe SUV; Class: Mid-size; Doors: 5; Seats: 5; Production: 2020–present; Range: 615 km (382 mi) (NEDC)

=== Upcoming Nio vehicles ===
Name	Expected launch	Segment	Notes
Nio ES7	2026	Mid-size SUV	Second-generation ES7

=== Onvo ===
Photo	Name	Chinese name	Generation	Specifications
SUV
	L60	乐道L60	First	Body style: Coupe SUV; Class: Mid-size; Doors: 5; Seats: 5; Production: 2024–present; Range: 555–730 km (345–454 mi) (CLTC)
	L80	乐道L80	First	Body style: SUV; Class: Full-size; Doors: 5; Seats: 5; Production: 2026–present; Range: 550–605 km (342–376 mi) (CLTC)
	L90	乐道L90	First	Body style: SUV; Class: Full-size; Doors: 5; Seats: 7; Production: 2025–present; Range: 550–605 km (342–376 mi) (CLTC)

=== Firefly ===
Photo	Name	Chinese name	Generation	Specifications
Hatchback
	Firefly	萤火虫	First	Body style: Hatchback; Class: Subcompact; Doors: 5; Seats: 5; Production: 2025–present; Range: 330 km (210 mi) (WLTP) 420 km (260 mi) (CLTC) 400 km (250 mi) (NEDC)

== Discontinued vehicles ==
=== Nio ===
Photo	Name	Chinese name	Generation	Specifications
Sport car
	EP9	蔚来EP9	First	Body style: Coupe; Class: Sports car; Doors: 2; Seats: 2; Motor: Indirectly water-cooled electric motors; Production: 2016–2019; Range: 427 km (265 mi); Top speed: 313 km/h (194 mph)
SUV
	ES7	蔚来ES7	First	Body style: SUV; Class: Mid-size; Doors: 5; Seats: 5; Production: 2022–2025; Range: 485 km (301 mi) (NEDC) with 75 kWh battery
