= Nio ES9 =

Battery electric full-size luxury SUV

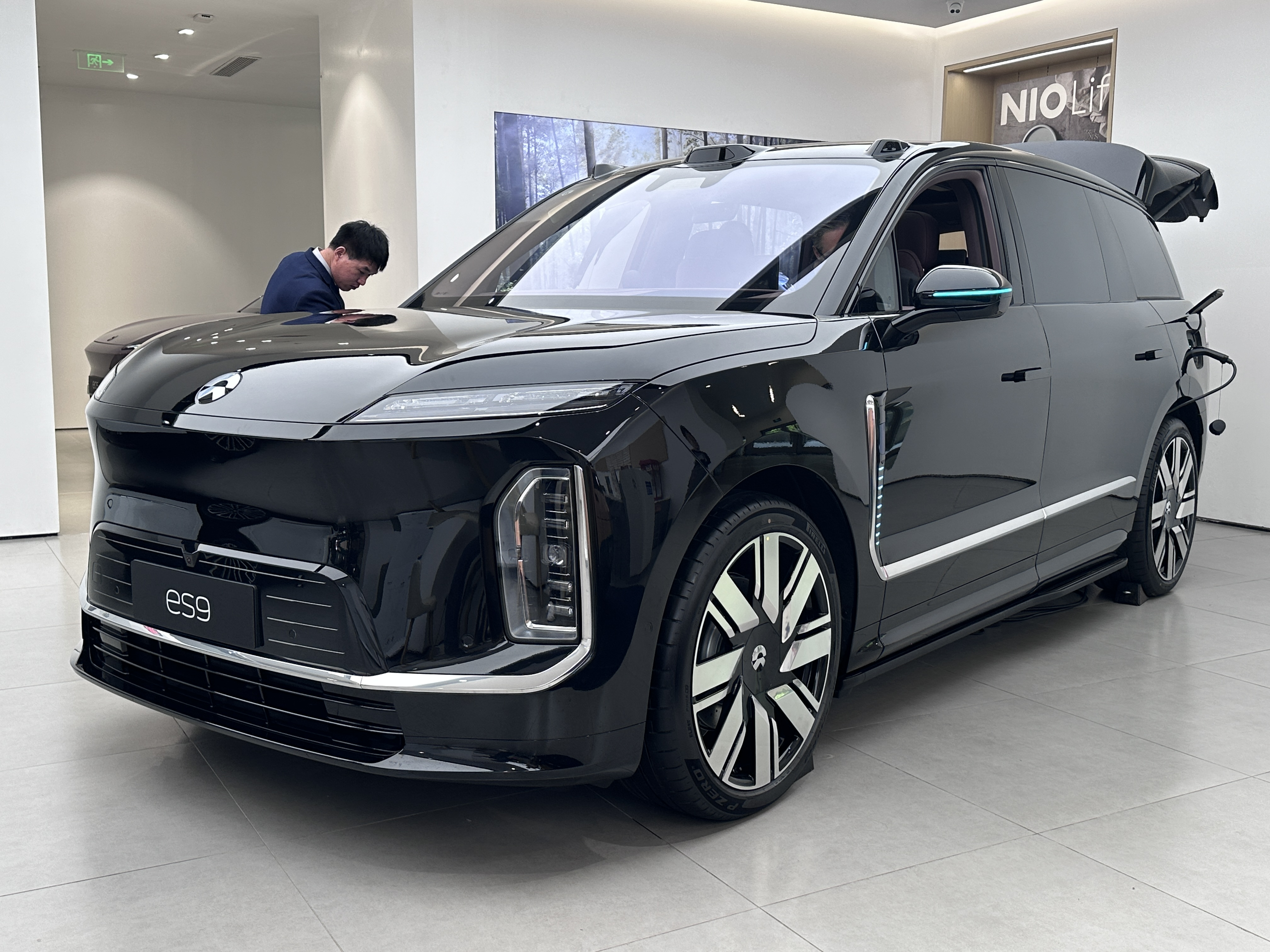

Overview
- Manufacturer: Nio Inc.
- Model code: Draco
- Production: 2026–present
- Assembly: China: F2 Hefei, Anhui

Body and chassis
- Class: Full-size luxury SUV
- Body style: 5-door SUV
- Layout: Dual-motor 4WD
- Platform: NT 3.0
- Related: Nio ET9; Nio ES8

Powertrain
- Electric motor: 180 kW YS198S002 AC induction (front); 340 kW TZ198Y001 permanent magnet synchronous (rear)
- Power output: 697 hp (520 kW; 707 PS)
- Battery: 102 kWh NMC CATL
- Electric range: 600–620 km (373–385 mi) (CLTC)
- Plug-in charging: DC: 600kW

Dimensions
- Wheelbase: 3,250 mm (128.0 in)
- Length: 5,365 mm (211.2 in)
- Width: 2,029 mm (79.9 in)
- Height: 1,870 mm (73.6 in)
- Curb weight: 2,845–2,915 kg (6,272–6,426 lb)

The Nio ES9 is a battery electric full-size luxury SUV manufactured by Chinese electric car company Nio. It was initially revealed in January 2026, with more details and pre-sales launch in April 2026. The ES9 serves as Nio's flagship SUV and serves as the SUV counterpart to the ET9 flagship sedan.

Former basketball player Yao Ming, who became NIO's Chief Experience Officer in May 2026, fronted trailers and videos showcasing the ES9.

== Overview ==
The Nio CEO William Li said on 6 January 2026 that the ES9 will launch in the second quarter of 2026 and had completed the tooling trial phase and is entering the pre-production phase. Li said that the ES9 will share all of the Nio ET9's technologies, and will differentiate itself from the smaller ES8 by aiming for business users. The ES9 was revealed through official documents on 8 January 2026. The ES9 was revealed on 9 April 2026 and opened pre-sales on the same day. Deliveries are expected to begin in late May 2026.

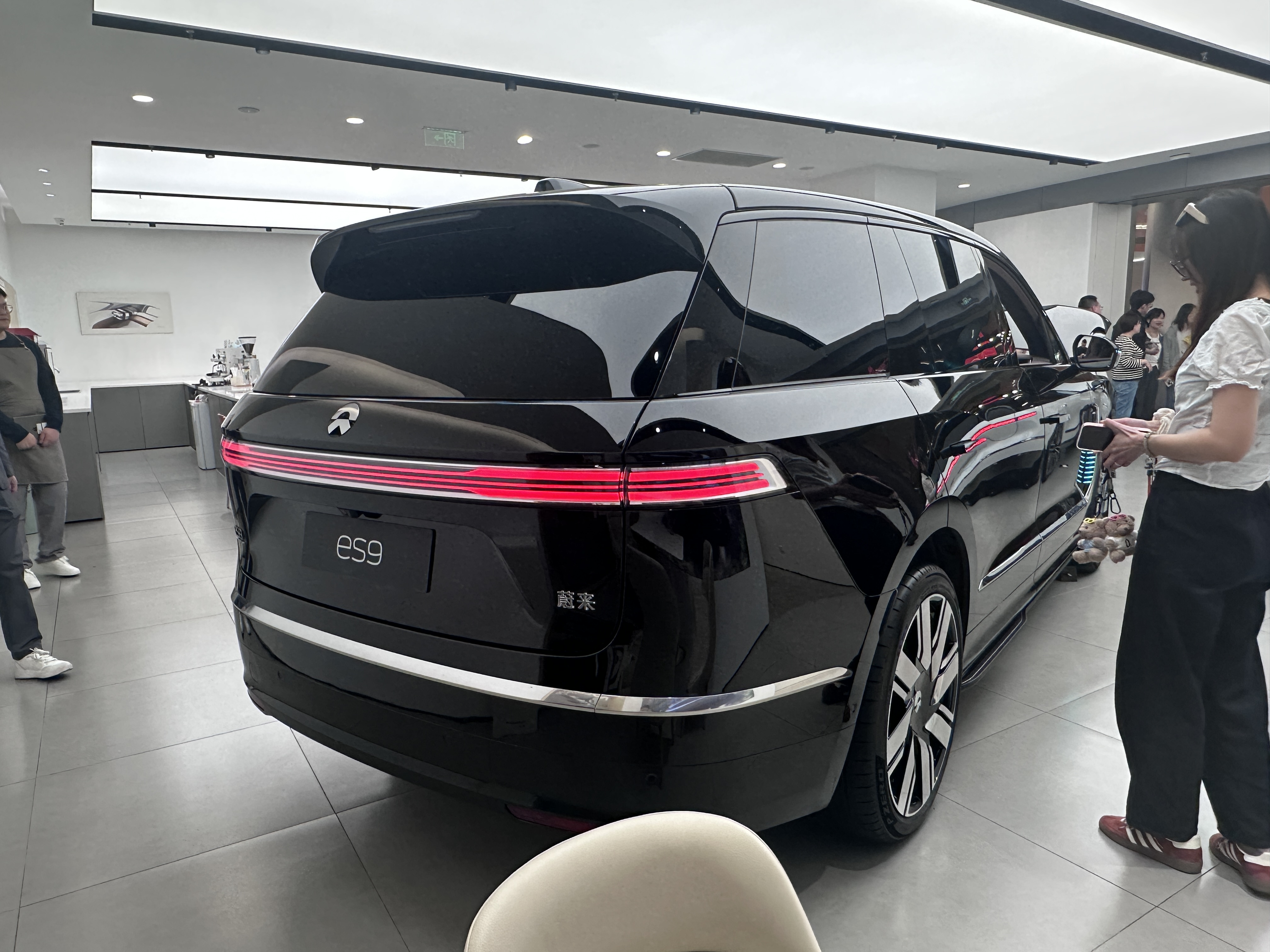
Rear view

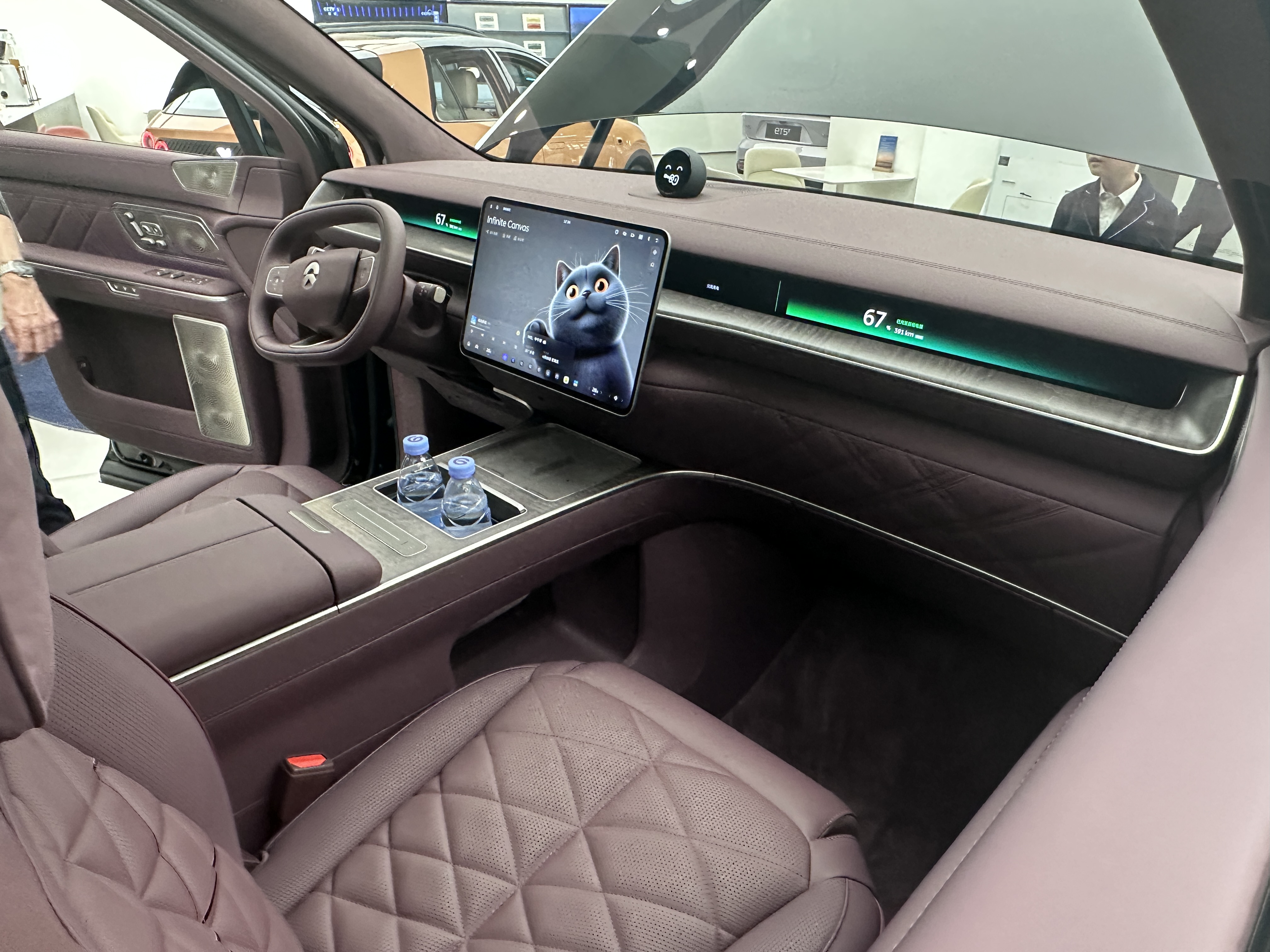
Interior

The ES9 has a steer-by-wire system, which allows for a dynamic steering ratio of 6–14:1 depending on the speed, and also includes 8.4-degree rear-wheel steering which allows for a turning radius of 5.4 metres (17.7 ft). It uses Nio's Skyride (Chinese: 天行; pinyin: tiān xíng) fully active electrohydraulic suspension system supplied by Nio investee Clearmotion, supplemented by dual-chamber air springs with 130 mm (5.1 in) of ride height adjustment and continuous damping control. The ES9 is equipped with 6-piston brakes, which results in a claimed 220 km/h (137 mph)–0 stopping distance of 35.3 metres (116 ft). The chassis consists of 6 longitudinal, 11 horizontal, and 8 vertical beams, and 91% of the chassis consists of high-strength steel or aluminum alloy including 85 kg (187 lb) of 2,000 MPa (290 ksi) hot-formed steel. The ES9 has a 940 mm (37 in) front crumple zone and uses 12 airbags which collectively total to 525 L (18.5 cu ft) including 93 L (3.3 cu ft) 3.7-metre (150 in) long side curtain airbags. Nio says the ES9 has 2,805 mm (110.4 in) cabin length with 1,520 mm (60 in) devoted to the second row resulting in 595 mm (23.4 in) of kneeroom. It has 1,097 mm (43.2 in), 1,096 mm (43.1 in), and 1,002 mm (39.4 in) of headroom for the first, second, and third rows, respectively.

The ES9 has Nio's characteristic 'double dash' daytime running lights, this time featuring 6,826 micro facets to achieve a crystal look. Below them are the micro LED headlights consisting of 5 lighting modules on each side capable of displaying graphics on the road surface up to 23 metres (75 ft) ahead, such as navigation lane guidance. The doors have a power-deploying side step, and the key uses UWB technology. It has illuminated pop-out door handles with a dual power supply and a mechanical failsafe mode for safety in the event of a collision. Both front and rear doors can be manually or power operated. It has autonomous driving indicator lights built into the side mirrors and LiDAR sensor area. The rear uses a 'lightbar' taillight design with a high-gloss brushed metal surround and a hidden rear wiper. The ES9 has a drag coefficient of 0.264 C_{d}. There are seven exterior paint colors available: Dawn Radiance Gold, Cloud White, M42 Nebula Red, Polaris Australis Blue, Starry Green, Polar Night Black, and Moonlight Silver. A 'Black Gold' aesthetic package is available, which makes the exterior trim, badges, and wheels black.

The interior features a 15.6-inch 3.3K resolution AMOLED central infotainment touchscreen display, which is flanked by a narrow 48-inch 'Skyline' display integrated into the dashboard which serves as the digital instrument cluster on the driver's side and an information display on the passenger side, and is supplemented by a 38-inch augmented-reality heads-up display. The center console has a 'TUI Bar', a piezoelectric touch slider that can operate controls such as volume. The second row has twin 16-inch 3K resolution AMOLED entertainment displays integrated into the back of the front seats, which actively power adjust to compensate for seat angle changes. Those displays are equipped with 4K cameras and a face lighting system to enable video conferencing, with audio routed through the headrest speakers to maximize privacy. The optional center console has integrated airliner-style folding tables, deployable cupholders, 8.8 L (0.31 cu ft) cooled or heating compartment with a temperature range of −2–55 °C (28–131 °F), dual 50-watt active-cooled wireless charging pads, and an 8-inch tilting control screen integrated into it. An optional connector accessory can connect the front and second row console into a single unified divider with extra table space. The second row has access to a deployable footrest which features dual-zone heated and a 20-point massaging function. The ES9 has a 2-metre (6.6 ft) long and 1.5-metre (4.9 ft) wide sunroof split along the centerline to allow for individual sunshades for each passenger. Nio says the interior has a total 2.3 m^{2} (25 sq ft) of heated surfaces, along with suction-style ventilated seating. The third row seats can individually recline up to 135 degrees and move 120 mm (4.7 in), and have a seat cushion length of 502 mm (19.8 in), which Nio claims is best in class. Each third row seat has access to its own individual climate control zone, and also have electronic dimming windows with physical sunshades. The vehicle has a 3,020-watt 47-speaker 9.2.4.8 surround sound system, which consists of 9 surround sound audio channels, 2 subwoofers, 4 overhead channels, and 8 headrest audio channels. Nio says the ES9 uses 5-layer laminated glass, 2.3 m^{2} (25 sq ft) of sound deadening throughout the vehicle, and a 28-mic active noise cancellation system capable of up to 12dBA of noise reduction to minimize wind and road noise. The second and third row windows have electronic dimming windows which can partially darken the pane in segments. The interior is upholstered in full-grain chrome-free Nappa leather which Nio says covers over 8 m^{2} (86 sq ft) of surfaces. It is available in Tortoiseshell Brown or Cloud Beige combined with Agate Black, Sand White with Cocoa Brown, or Sappanwood Red, all of which comes with maple wood and aluminium trim. There are 137 physical buttons throughout the cabin.

The rear cargo area is 606 mm (23.9 in) deep and has a 600 L (21 cu ft) capacity with 123 L (4.3 cu ft) of underfloor storage, which increases to 1,586 L (56.0 cu ft) with the third row seats folded down, and is supplemented by a 216-litre (7.6 cu ft) frunk that has access to a 48-watt charging port inside which Nio says can fit two 20-inch suitcases and up to 100 kg (220 lb). The air suspension automatically lowers by 35 mm (1.4 in) to ease cargo access when either the trunk or frunk is opened.

The ES9 has a semiautonomous driving capable ADAS system which uses two of Nio's self-developed Shenji NX9031 chips and Nio's Cedar Aquila 31-sensor suite consisting of 1 long-range LiDAR, 2 side-mounted LiDAR, 1 4D mmWave radar, 7 8MP cameras, 4 3MP surround view cameras, and 12 ultrasonic sensors. The long-range front-facing LiDAR sensor has a 500 m (1,600 ft) range and covers 120° horizontally and 9.6° vertically using its 1550nm laser. The side facing LiDAR sensors have a range of 150 m (490 ft) and cover 120° horizontally and 70° vertically.

== Horizon special edition ==
The Horizon special edition comes with unique two-tone paint with pinstriping in either Moonlight Silver or Dawn Radiance Gold combined with Polar Night Black, 22-inch wheels, unique seats with 'rivers and mountains' embroidery, Sapphire Red interior surfaces, and 'Horizon' badging throughout the interior and exterior.

== Powertrain ==
The ES9 is exclusively available with a dual-motor all-wheel drive powertrain shared with the Nio ET9. It uses a 900-volt class electrical architecture and a 102 kWh NMC battery pack which is compatible with Nio's battery swapping network. The drivetrain consists of a 180 kW (241 hp; 245 PS) front induction motor and a 340 kW (456 hp; 462 PS) permanent magnet synchronous rear motor for a total of 697 hp (520 kW; 707 PS) and 700 N⋅m (516 lb⋅ft) of torque. It can deliver up to 8,000 N⋅m (5,900 lb⋅ft) of wheel torque. The powertrain runs at 925 volts, and the battery can charge at up to 600 kW or 765 amps. It achieves a CLTC range rating of 620 km (385 mi), or 600 km (373 mi) when equipped with larger wheel options. It has a 0–100 km/h (62 mph) time of 4.3 seconds and a top speed of 220 km/h (137 mph).
