= Onvo =

Chinese electric vehicle brand owned by Nio Inc.

- Company type: Brand
- Industry: Automotive
- Founded: March 2024; 2 years ago
- Headquarters: Shanghai, China
- Area served: China
- Key people: Shen Fei (president)
- Products: Electric vehicle
- Parent: Nio Inc.
- Website: onvo.cn

Onvo
- Simplified Chinese: 乐道
- Hanyu Pinyin: Lèdào

Onvo (Chinese: 乐道; pinyin: Lèdào) is a Chinese electric vehicle subordinate brand under Nio Inc., intended to target at the general mass market. The brand was released in 2024 and is based in Shanghai.

Onvo's first model, the L60, went on sale in September 2024.

== History ==
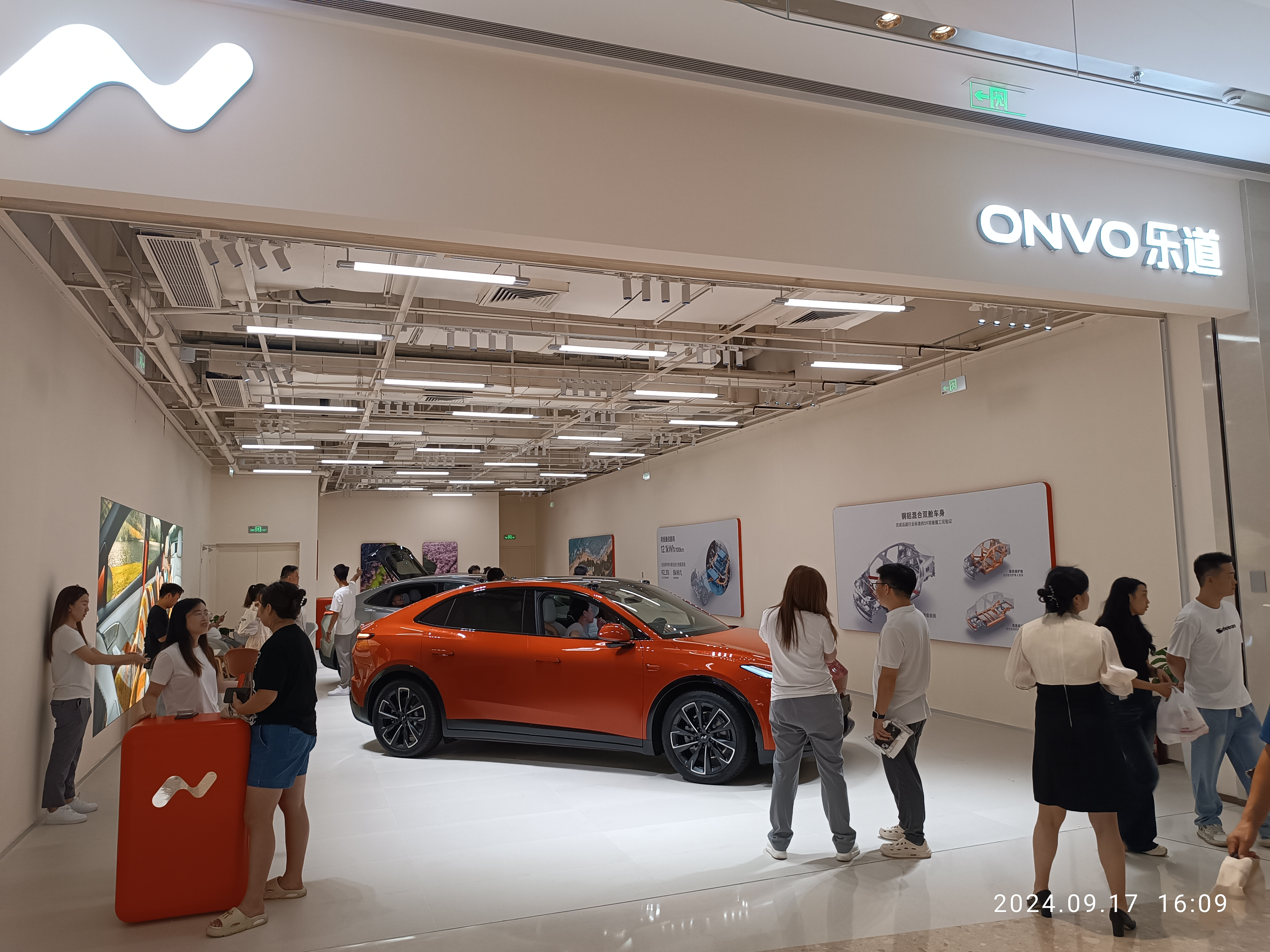
An Onvo showroom in Zhongshan, China

In spring 2023, Nio announced plans to expand its portfolio with two additional brands, including a more affordable line aimed at the European market. One of these brands was internally referred to as "Alps". By February 2024, images of a camouflaged prototype from this brand were published, still under the "Alps" codename. In March 2024, Nio disclosed the brand's official name, Onvo, by including it on the prototype.

Onvo was formally introduced in May 2024. Onvo stands for "On Voyage," while its Chinese name, 乐道; Lèdào, is intended to evoke the idea of a family enjoying time together. Onvo was identified as a key element to help Nio increase its market share and expand its customer base. The launch included the introduction of the brand's website, mobile application, and Alan Ai (Ai Tiecheng), a senior vice president at Nio, as president of the brand. Its first product, a mid-size SUV named the L60, was also unveiled. Positioned to compete with the Tesla Model Y, the L60 features low energy consumption, a long range, and is priced competitively. Nio CEO William Li stated that Onvo vehicles would be available in domestic and export markets such as Europe, with deliveries of the L60 expected to begin in September 2024.

== Products ==
- Onvo L60 (2024–present), mid-size coupe SUV
- Onvo L90 (2025–present), full-size SUV
  - Onvo L80 (2026–present), 2-row version of L90
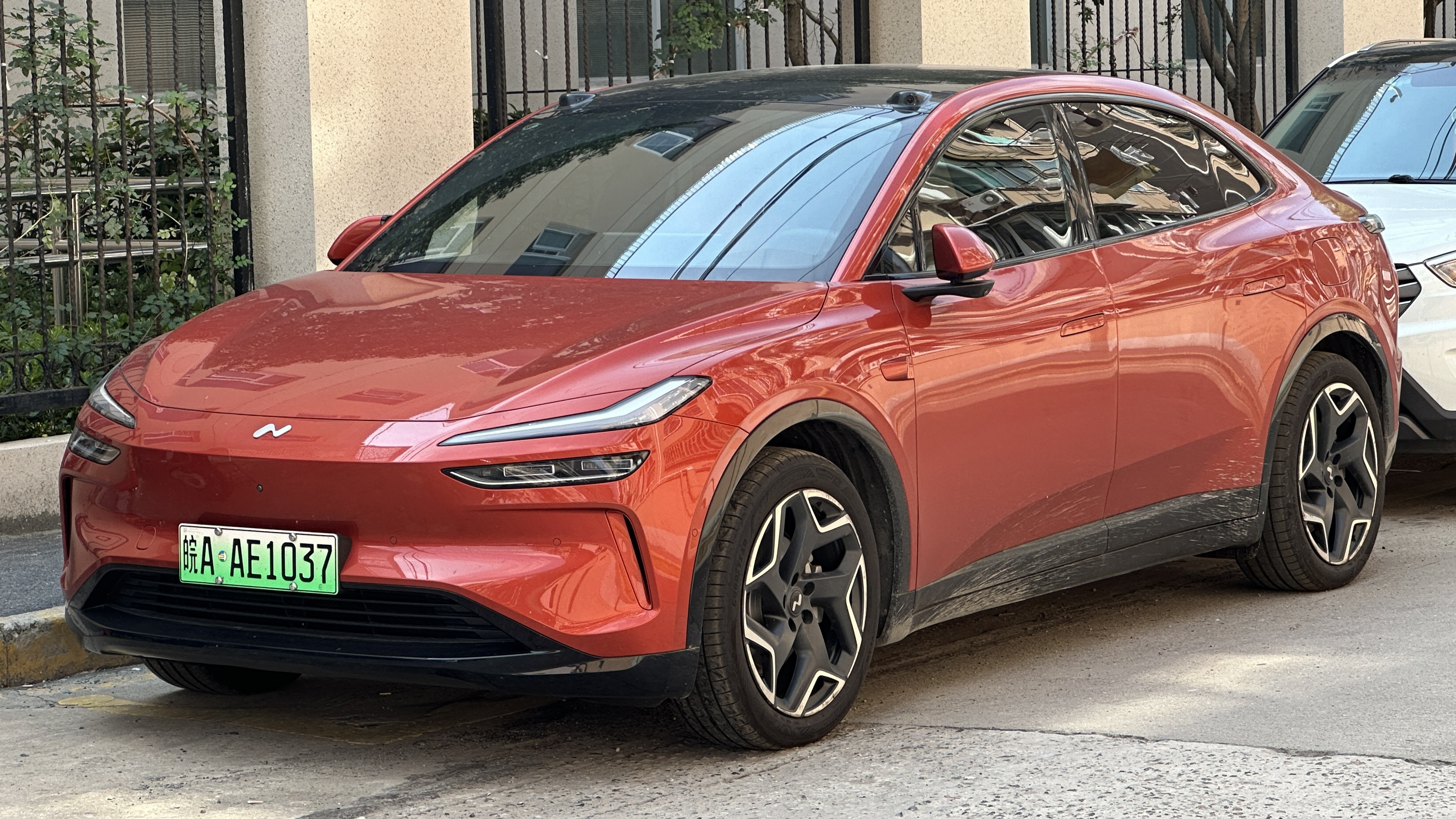
Onvo L60

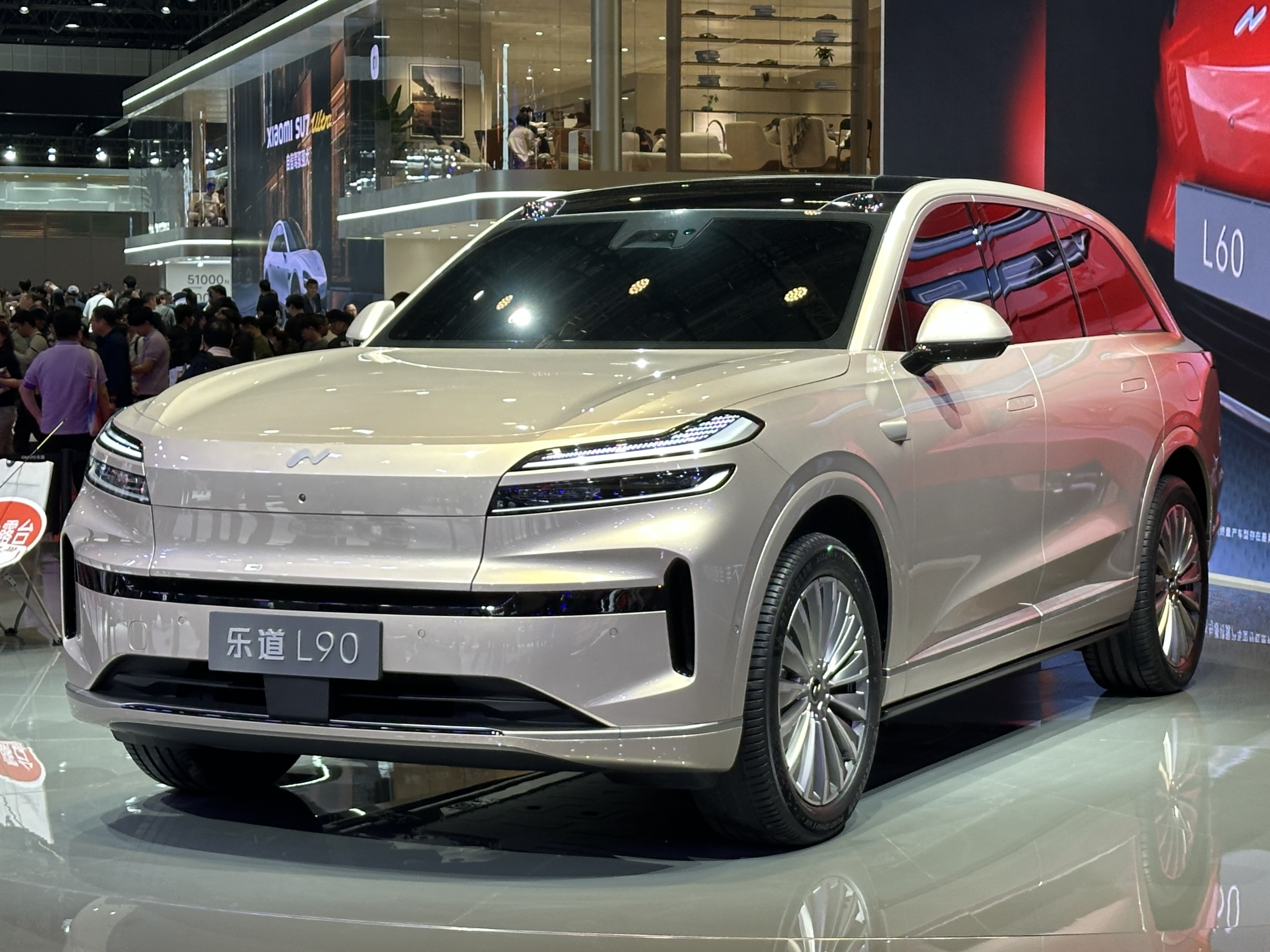
Onvo L90

== See also ==
- Automobile manufacturers and brands of China
- List of automobile manufacturers of China
- Nio Inc.
- Firefly (marque)
