= Firefly (marque) =

Chinese electric car brand owned by Nio Inc.

- Type: Brand
- Industry: Automotive
- Founded: December 2024; 1 year ago
- Headquarters: Shanghai, China
- Area served: China; Europe; Southeast Asia
- Key people: Daniel Jin (president)
- Products: Electric vehicles
- Parent: Nio Inc.
- Website: firefly.world

Firefly (Chinese: 萤火虫; pinyin: Yínghuǒchóng) is a brand of electric cars established by Chinese automotive manufacturer Nio Inc. in 2024, specializing in small, high-end electric cars for the Chinese and European car markets.

== History ==
The Firefly brand made its official debut in China on 21 December 2024 at the Nio Day 2024 company event. Established as a brand of small, high-end electric cars, Firefly's target market is Europe, and the brand was described by Nio's CEO William Li as a rival to European small car brands including Smart and Mini. After its launch in China and upcoming launch in Europe during the second quarter of 2025, the brand will be eventually sold in the Latin American and Southeast Asian markets. Nio initially planned for Firefly to be launched in Europe before China, but tariffs in Europe were blamed as the reason for the delayed launch.

At the Nio Day 2024 event, former SAIC-GM executive Daniel Jin was announced as the Firefly brand's president.

According to Firefly, over 10,000 Firefly battery swaps were completed in the first 39 days after the first Nio fifth generation swap stations capable of swapping Firefly vehicles were opened on 6 August 2026. As of mid-September 2026, there are 42 Firefly-compatible swap stations located in 33 cities throughout China out of the 4,000 global count of Nio swap stations.

== Products ==
- Firefly (2025–present), subcompact hatchback
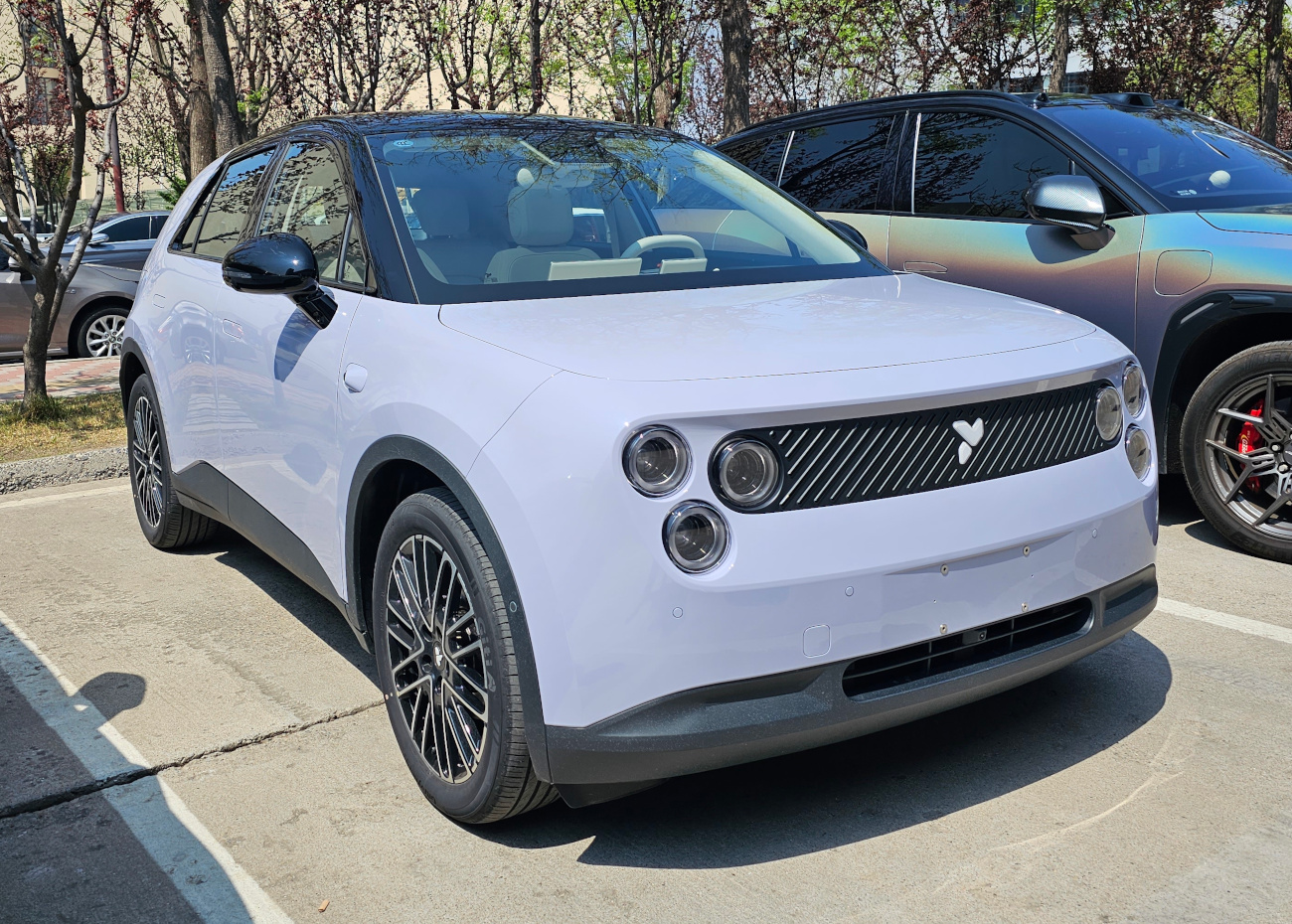
Firefly

== See also ==
- Onvo, another mass-market car brand owned by Nio Inc.
