= Nio Inc. =

Chinese electric vehicle manufacturer

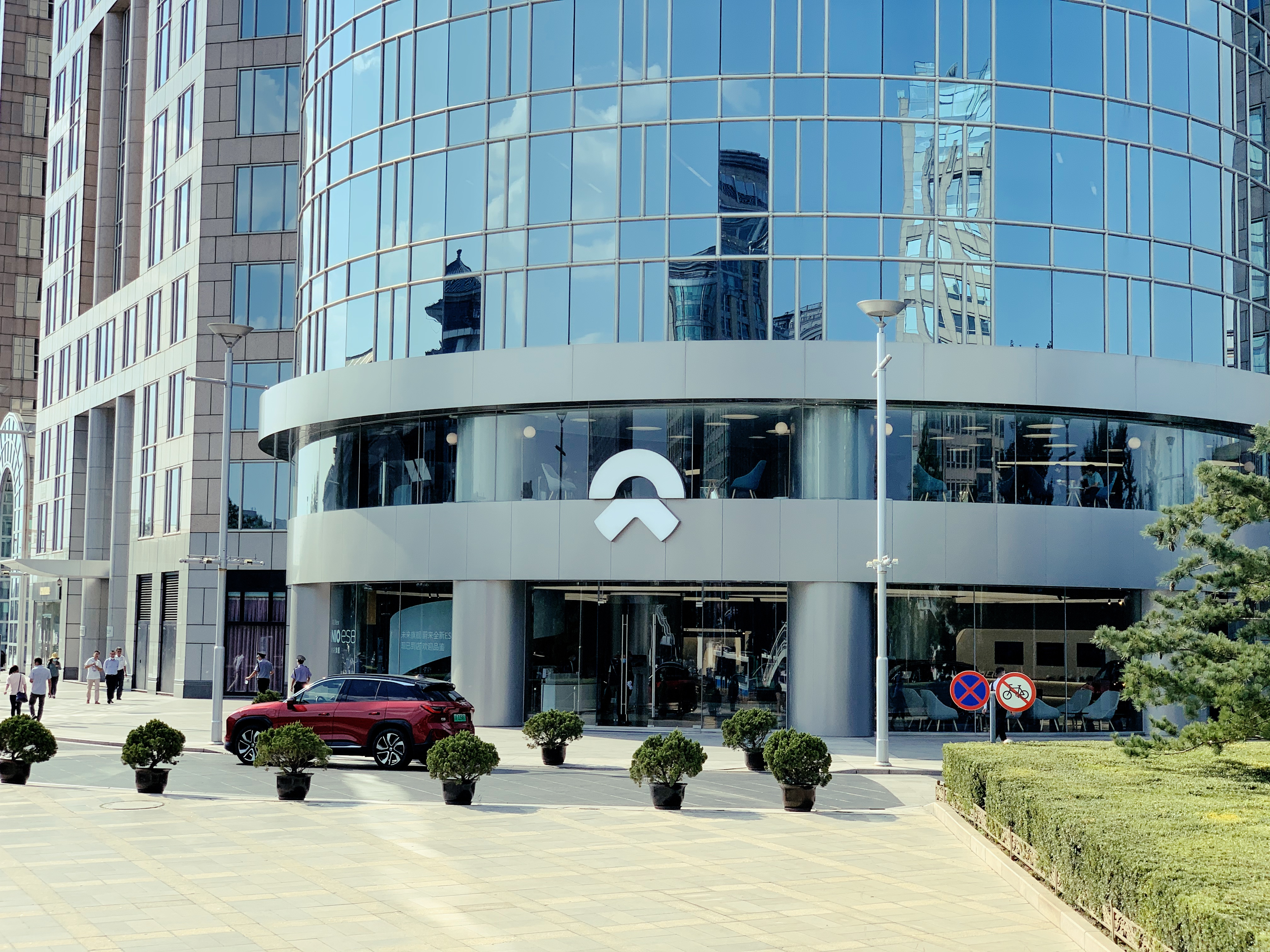
- Nio House in Beijing, China
- Formerly: NextEV (2014–2016)
- Type: Public
- Traded as: NYSE: NIO; SEHK: 9866; SGX: NIO
- ISIN: US62914V1061
- Industry: Automotive
- Founded: November 2014; 11 years ago
- Founder: William Li
- Headquarters: Shanghai, China
- Area served: China (including Macau); Germany; Belgium; The Netherlands; United Kingdom; Norway; Denmark; UAE; Israel; Singapore; Sweden; Thailand
- Key people: William Li (CEO); Lihong Qin (President); Wei Feng (CFO)
- Products: Electric vehicles; Smartphones
- Production output: 1,000,000 vehicles (as of 2026)
- Brands: Nio; Onvo; Firefly
- Revenue: CN¥65.73 billion (2024)
- Operating income: CN¥−15.64 billion (2022)
- Net income: CN¥−5.61 billion (2020)
- Total assets: CN¥96.26 billion (2022)
- Total equity: CN¥27.17 billion (2020)
- Number of employees: 32,820 (2024)
- Divisions: ERT Formula E Team

Chinese name
- Simplified Chinese: 上海蔚来汽车有限公司
- Traditional Chinese: 上海蔚來汽車有限公司
Transcriptions
Standard Mandarin
- Hanyu Pinyin: Shànghǎi Wèilái Qìchē Yǒuxiàn Gōngsī

Business name
- Simplified Chinese: 蔚来汽车
- Traditional Chinese: 蔚來汽車
- Literal meaning: Sky-Blue Coming Motor Vehicles
Transcriptions
Standard Mandarin
- Hanyu Pinyin: Wèilái Qìchē
- IPA: [wêɪlǎɪ tɕʰîʈʂʰɤ́]
- Website: nio.com

Nio Inc. (Chinese: 蔚来; pinyin: Wèilái; stylized as NIO) is a Chinese electric vehicle manufacturer headquartered in Shanghai. Founded in 2014, it adopted its current name in 2016. The company primarily designs and sells electric vehicles, including sedans and SUVs, but has expanded into other products and services, such as chip development, Smartphones, and power solutions.

In 2018, Nio filed for an initial public offering on the New York Stock Exchange.

Nio operates 3,989 battery swapping stations globally, with the majority being located in China (as of July 2026). The company has performed over 119 million swaps. The company develops semi-autonomous and autonomous vehicle technologies and has participated in Formula E racing since 2014. In 2024, it launched the Onvo and Firefly brands to serve the mass-market segment.

== Overview ==
Nio launched its brand on 21 November 2016 at the Saatchi Gallery in London. Investors included Tencent, Temasek, Sequoia Capital, Lenovo, and TPG Capital. The company also unveiled its first model, the Nio EP9 sports car, on the same day.

A month earlier, in October 2016, the company received an autonomous vehicle testing permit from the California Department of Motor Vehicles and began testing on public roads under the state’s Autonomous Vehicle Tester Program. It stated plans to develop vehicles with Level 3 and Level 4 autonomy.

In May 2018, Nio opened its first battery-swap station in the Nanshan District of Shenzhen, Guangdong, called the Power Swap Station. It initially served the ES8 model only.

The company filed for an initial public offering worth about US$1.8 billion on the New York Stock Exchange in September 2018.

By 2020, Nio faced major financial difficulties, and its share price had fallen 62% since the IPO. The Hefei city government acquired a 25% stake and helped the company secure loans from six local banks to strengthen its battery, engine, and control-system supply chains. In April 2020, Nio raised about US$1 billion from Chinese investors and transferred its main assets to a new subsidiary, Nio China, headquartered in Hefei. Vehicle production increased by 81% over the following year, and the company's valuation rose to about US$100 billion.

In August 2020, Nio introduced its Battery as a Service (BaaS) program and created a joint battery-asset company with Contemporary Amperex Technology Co., Limited (CATL), Hubei Science Technology Investment Group, and a subsidiary of Guotai Junan International Holdings. Each partner contributed CN¥200 million (about US$32 million) for a 25% share. The service lowered the purchase price of Nio vehicles by roughly 25%.

In May 2021, the company began its European expansion, announcing plans to start deliveries to Norway by September that year. In the third quarter of 2021, it delivered 24,439 ES8, ES6, and EC6 vehicles, an increase of about 100% year-on-year. Nio also announced plans to expand to 25 countries and regions by 2025.

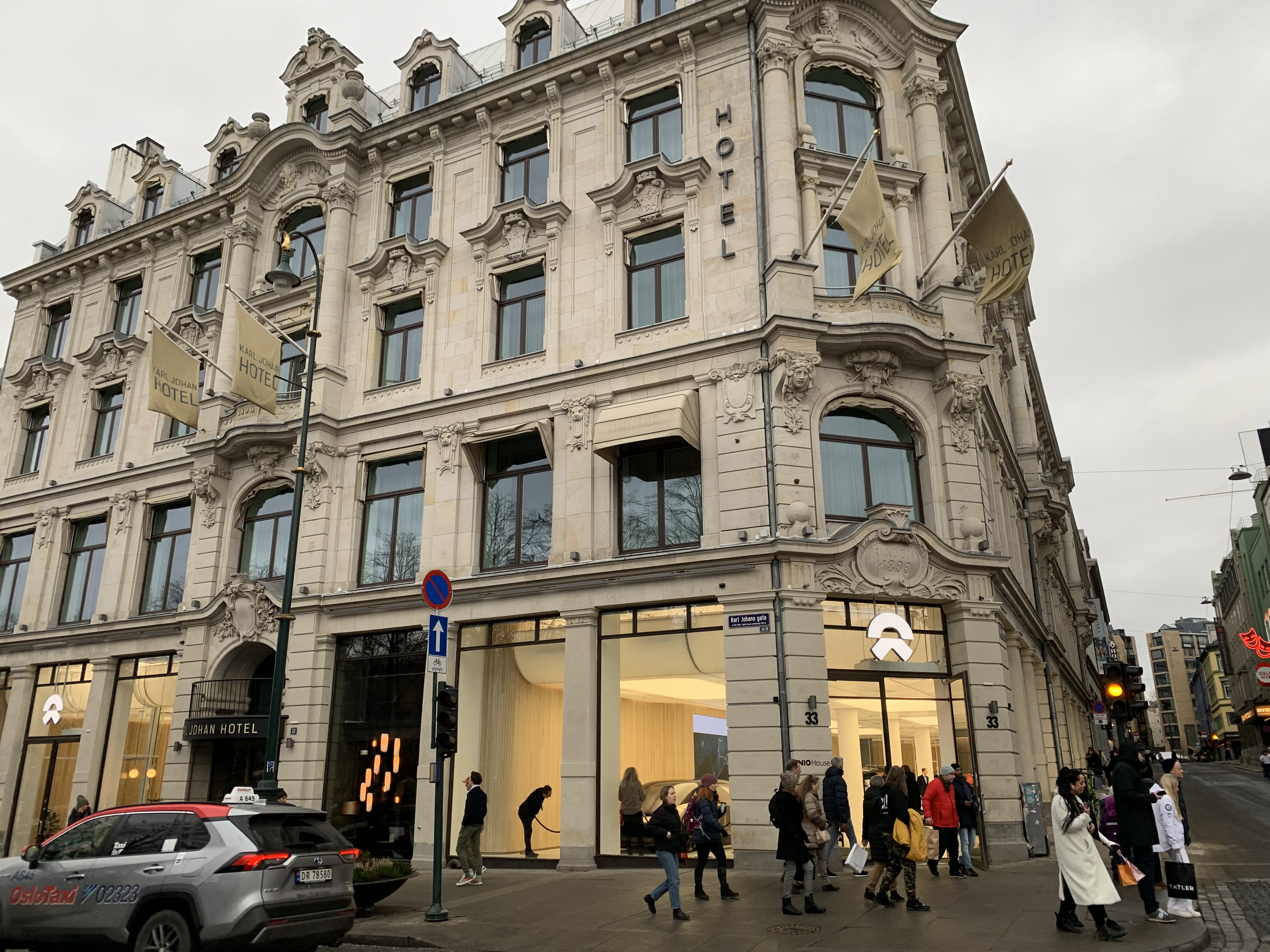
Nio House in Oslo, Norway

In August 2023, Nio Capital led the Series A financing of Mavel, a supplier of electric-drive systems. The same month, Nio was chosen to supply electric cars for taxi services in Oslo.

On 14 December 2023, founder and CEO William Li announced that Nio would launch a new brand for the family-car market to compete in lower price segments. The brand was planned to include three models and target the 200,000 yuan (≈€25,000) range.

Later that month, the company obtained full production qualification for automobiles and announced the purchase of JAC factories that manufacture Nio vehicles, for 3.2 billion yuan. The transaction ended JAC's role as Nio's original-equipment manufacturer.

== Vehicles ==
=== Currently (as of 2026) ===
- Nio ET5
- Nio EC6
- Nio ES6
- Nio EC7
- Nio ES7
- Nio ET7
- Nio ES8
- Nio ET9
- Nio ES9

=== Nio brand ===
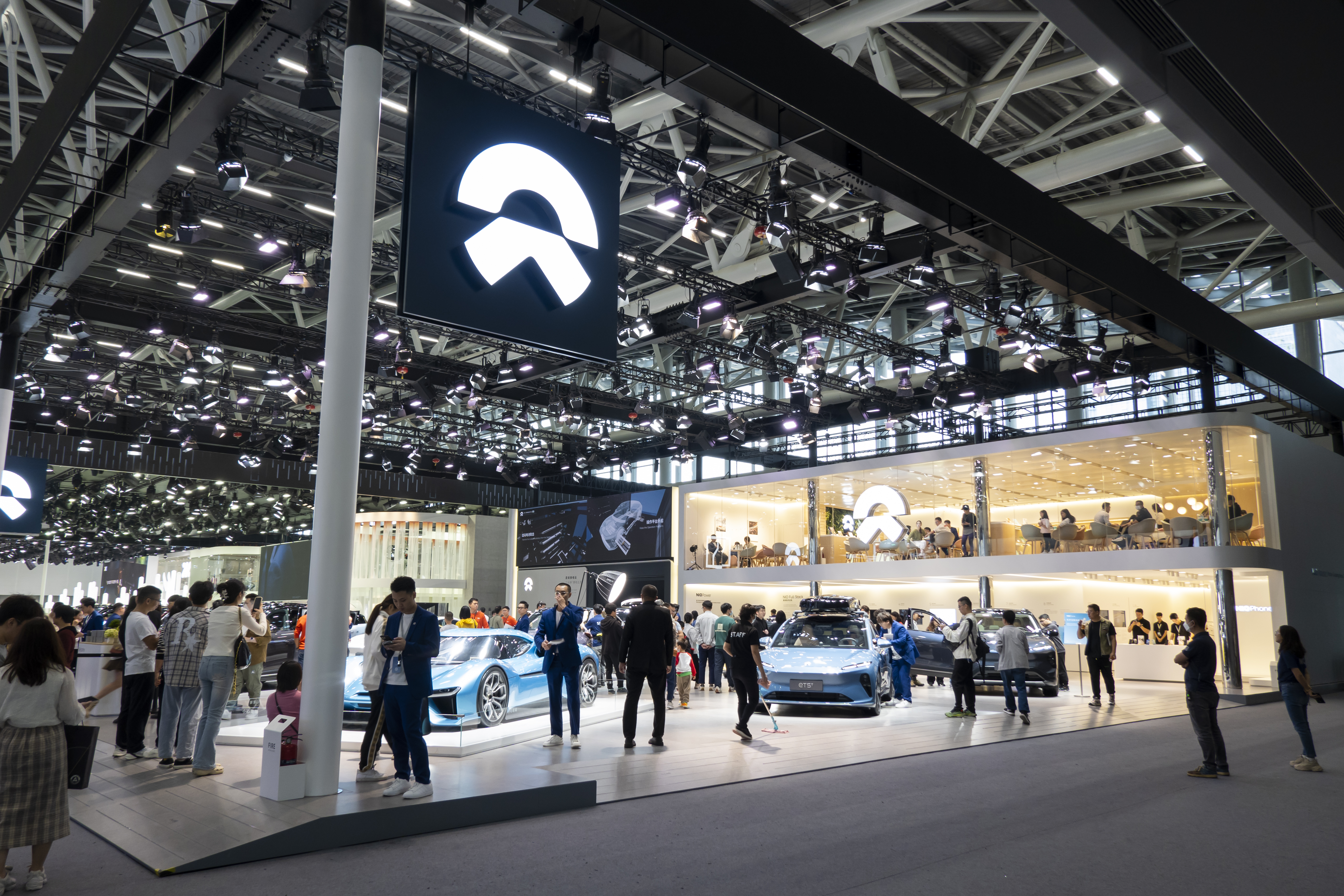
Nio at Auto Guangzhou 2023

Nio's first car, the Nio EP9 electric sports car, was unveiled on 21 November 2016, the same day the brand was launched. The company introduced the ES8, a seven-seat electric SUV, in December 2017 and began deliveries in June 2018. The ES6, a five-seat SUV, followed in December 2018 with deliveries starting in June 2019. In December 2019, Nio unveiled the EC6, a five-seat coupé-SUV, with deliveries beginning in September 2020. The ET7 sedan debuted in January 2021, and the smaller ET5 sedan was revealed at Nio Day in December 2021.

As of 2024, Nio has revealed two concept cars: the Eve at SXSW 2017 and the ET Preview at Auto Shanghai 2019.

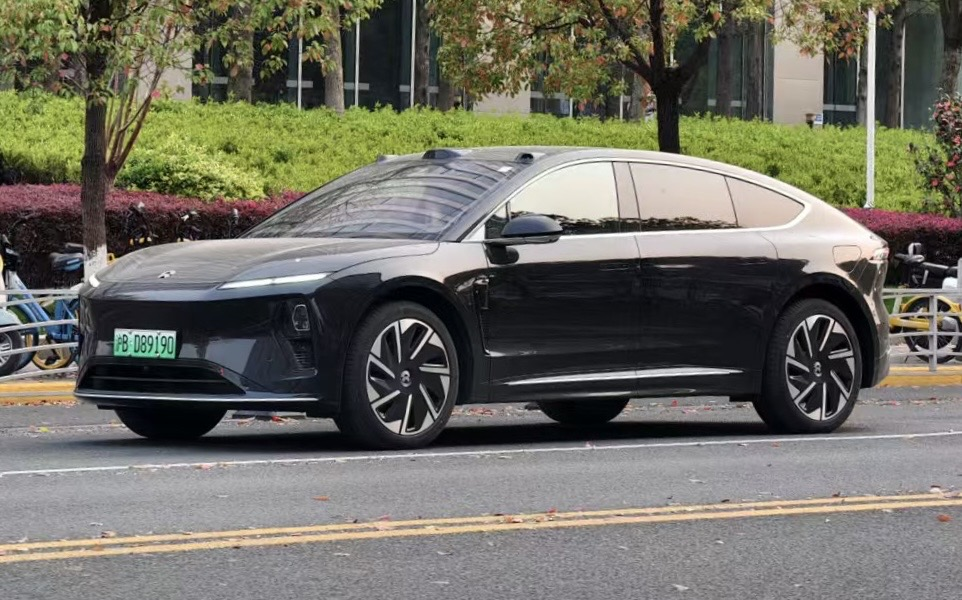
Nio ET9

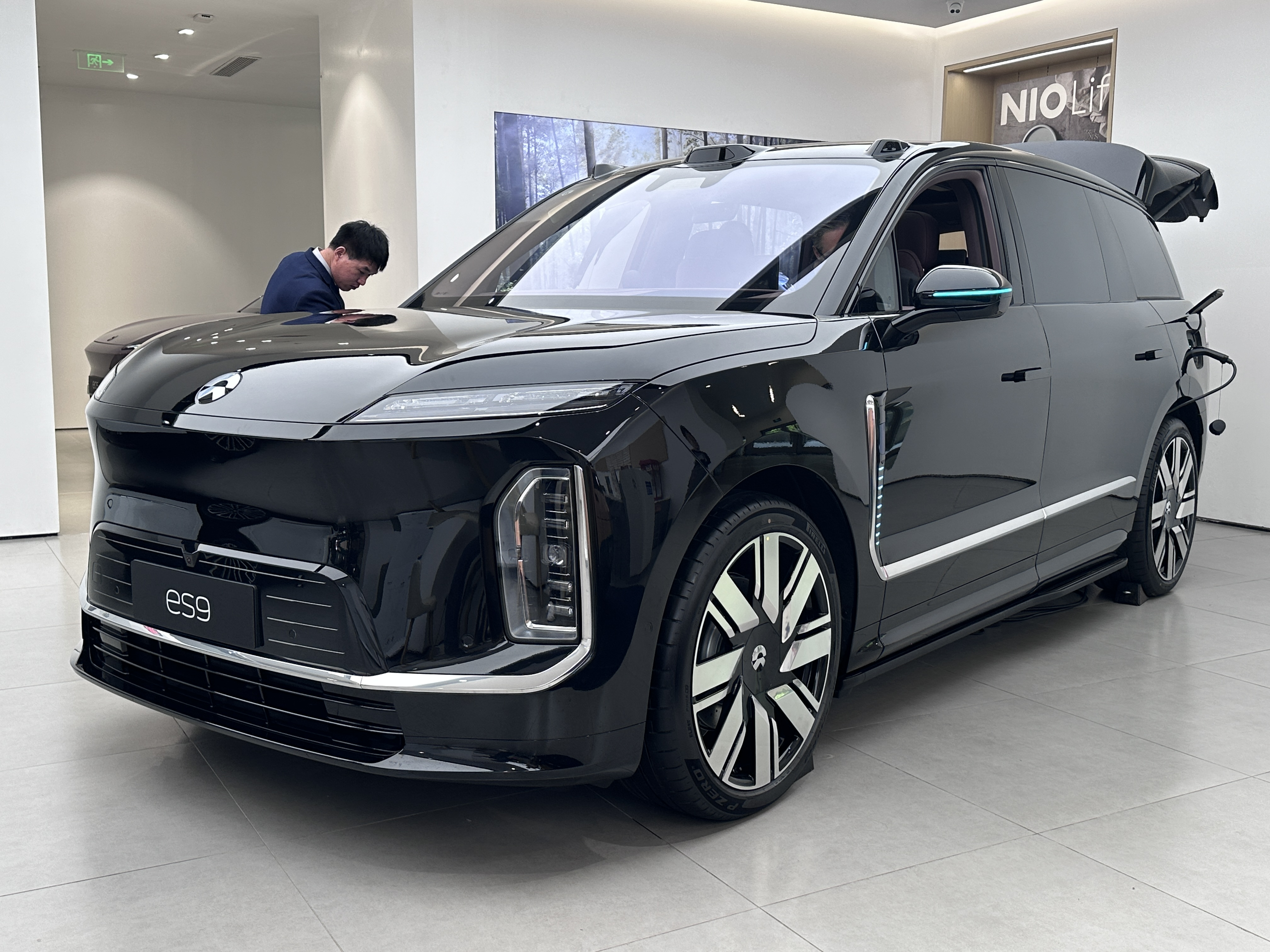
Nio ES9

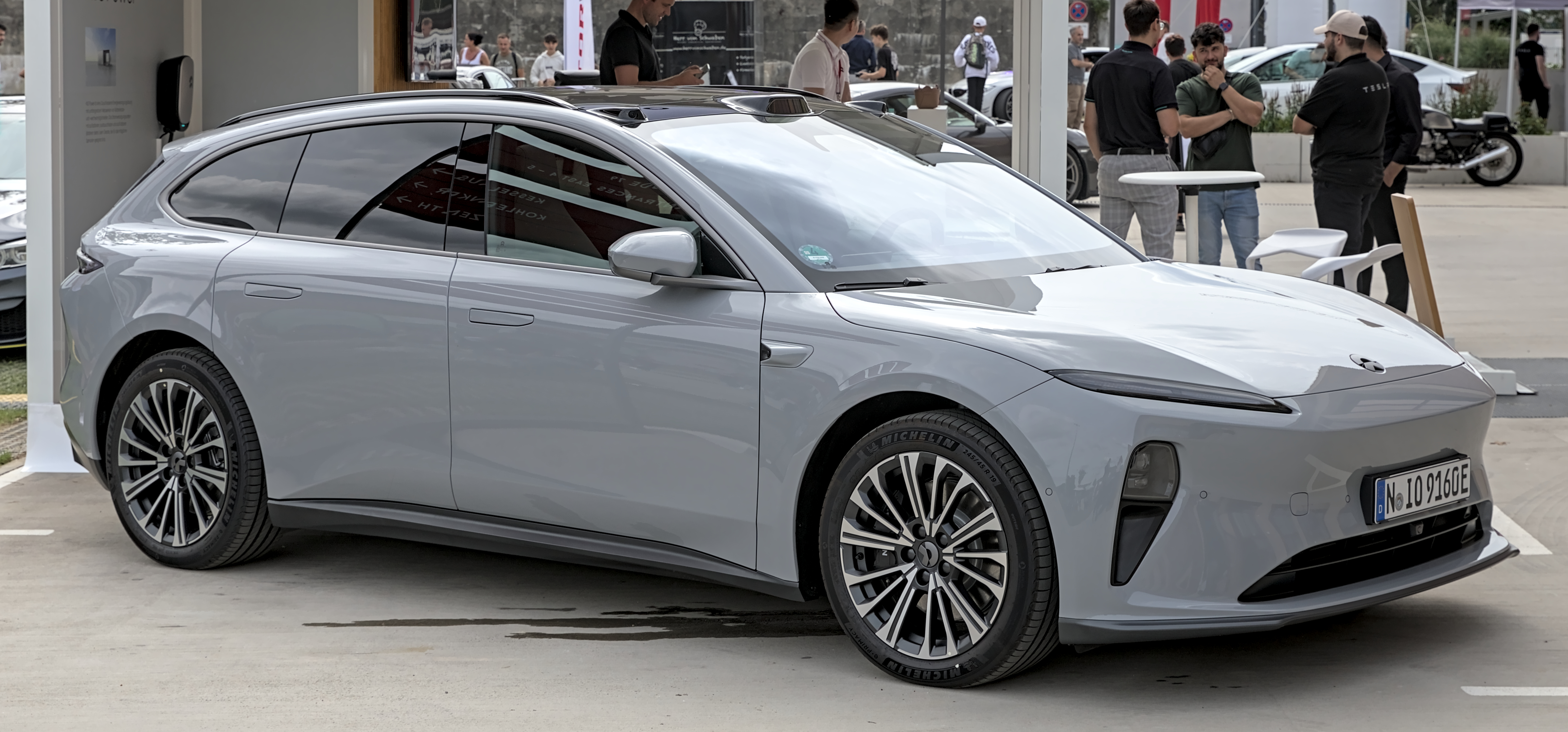
Nio ET5T

=== Onvo brand ===
In May 2024, Nio introduced a mass-market brand, Onvo (Chinese: 乐道; pinyin: Lèdào). The brand was developed under the internal codename "Alps" until the name was announced in March 2024. The name Onvo stands for "On Voyage," while the Chinese name means "joyful path," expressing family togetherness. The brand was initially led by Alan Ai, a senior vice president of Nio, who was replaced by Shen Fei in April 2025 after the brand missed early sales targets.

Onvo's first model, the Onvo L60, began deliveries in September 2024. The L60 targets the Tesla Model Y and was directly compared with it at launch. Nio CEO William Li stated that Onvo vehicles are expected to be sold in export markets.

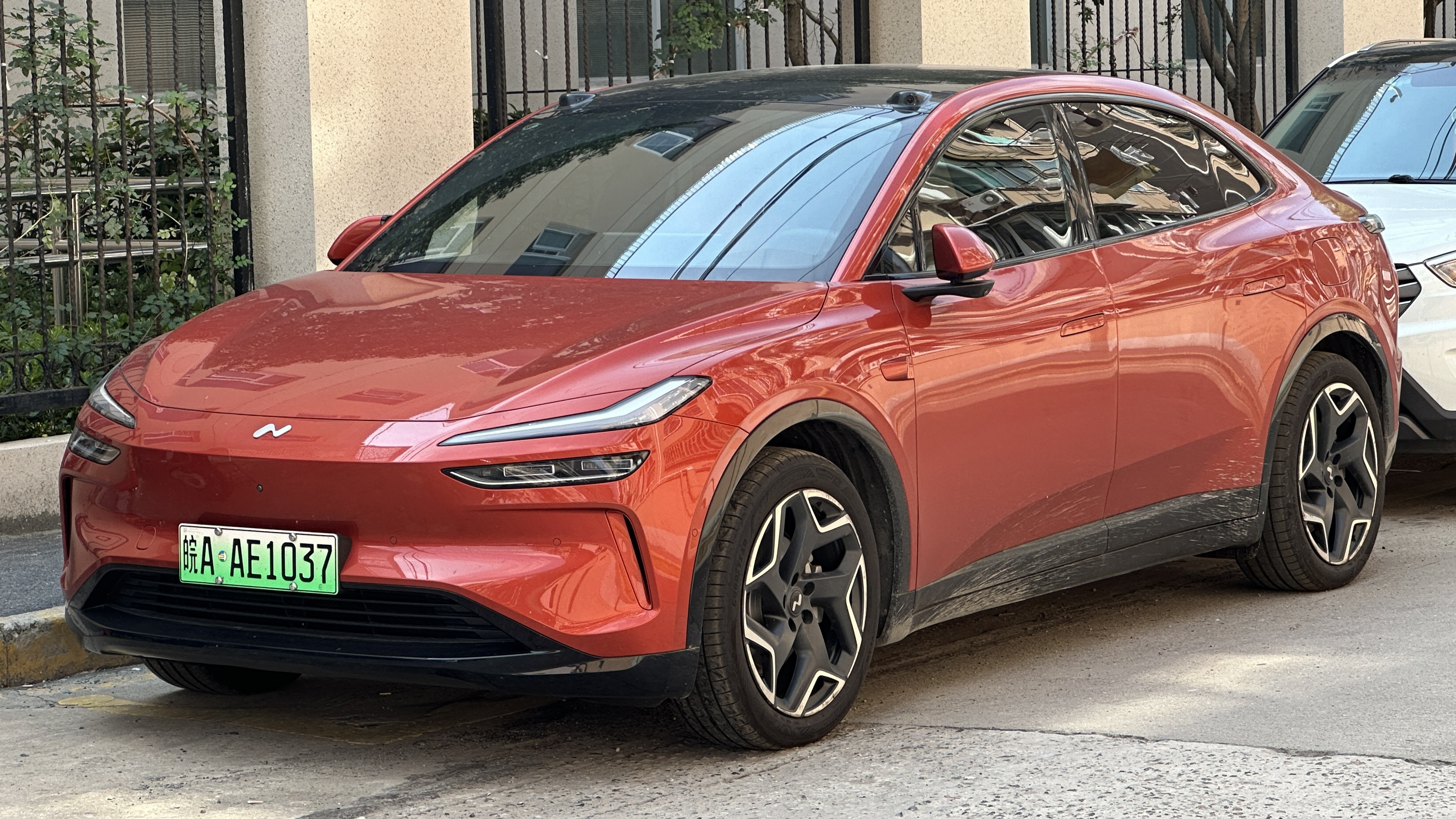
Onvo L60

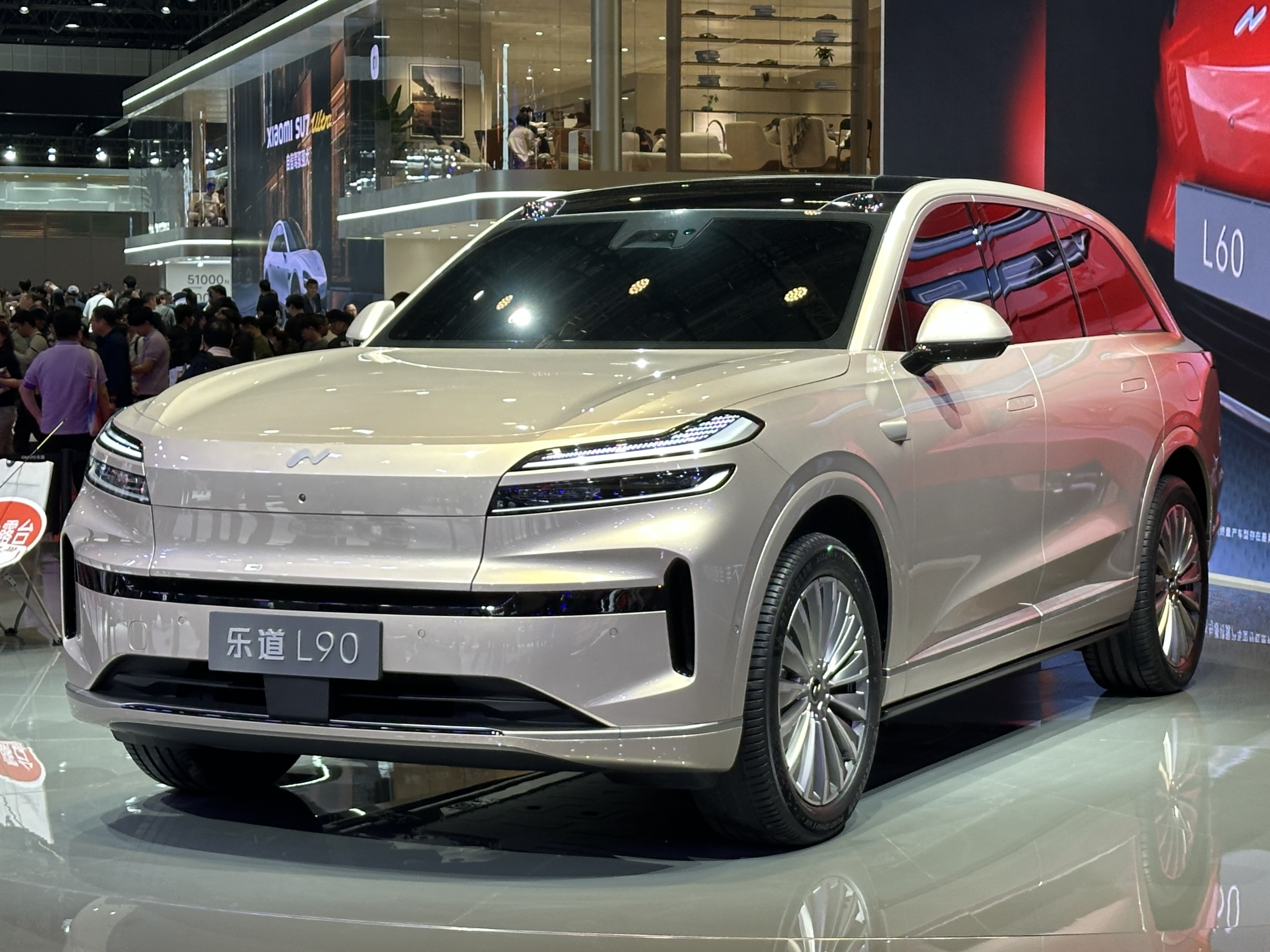
Onvo L90

=== Firefly brand ===
In December 2024, Nio announced another new brand, Firefly (Chinese: 萤火虫; pinyin: Yínghuǒchóng), developed from its internal codename of the same name. It is positioned as Nio's electric small-car brand. Firefly's first model was launched in April 2025 in China and in August 2025 in Europe. Nio described it as a competitor to Smart and Mini small cars.

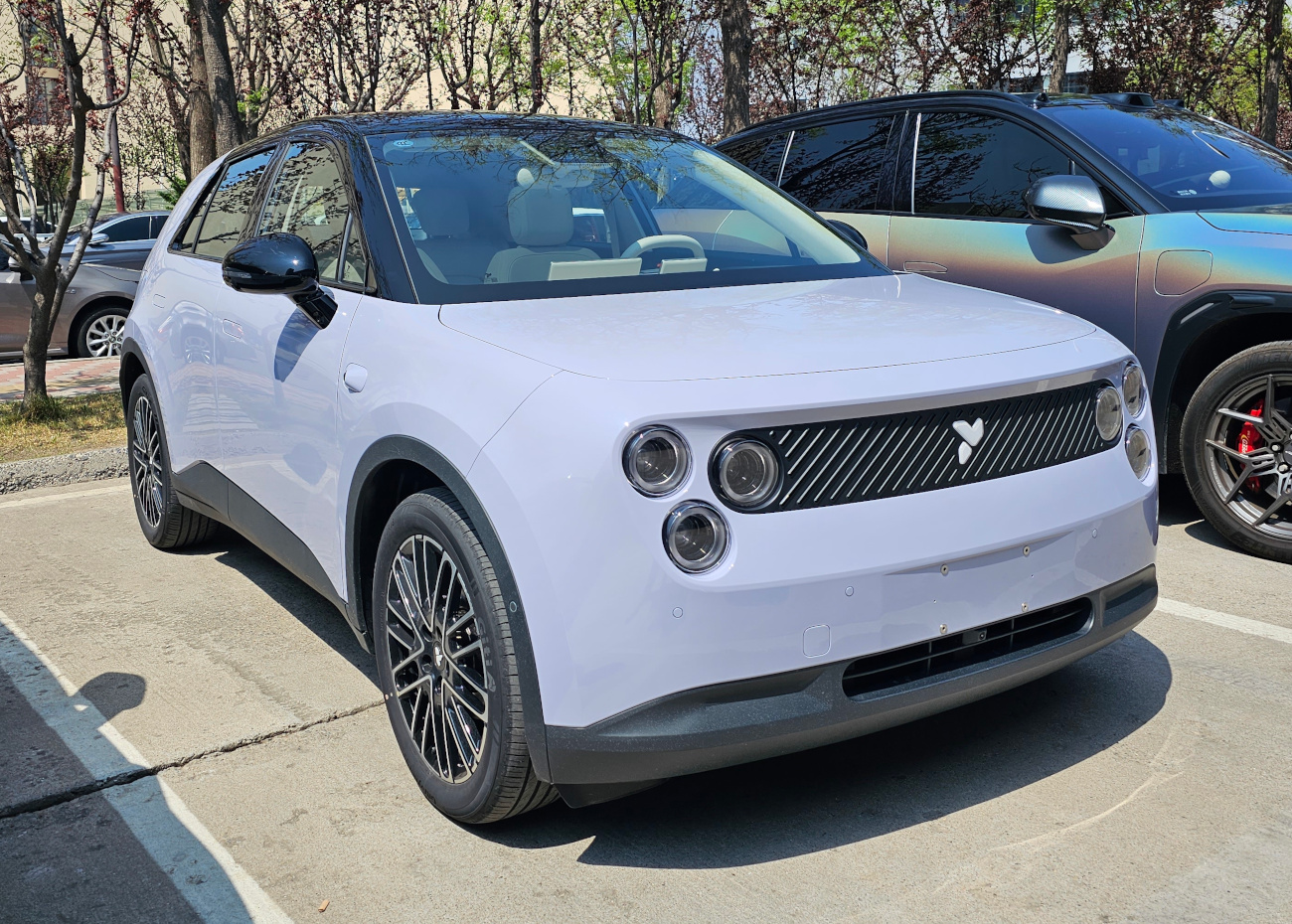
Firefly (vehicle)

== Battery swapping ==
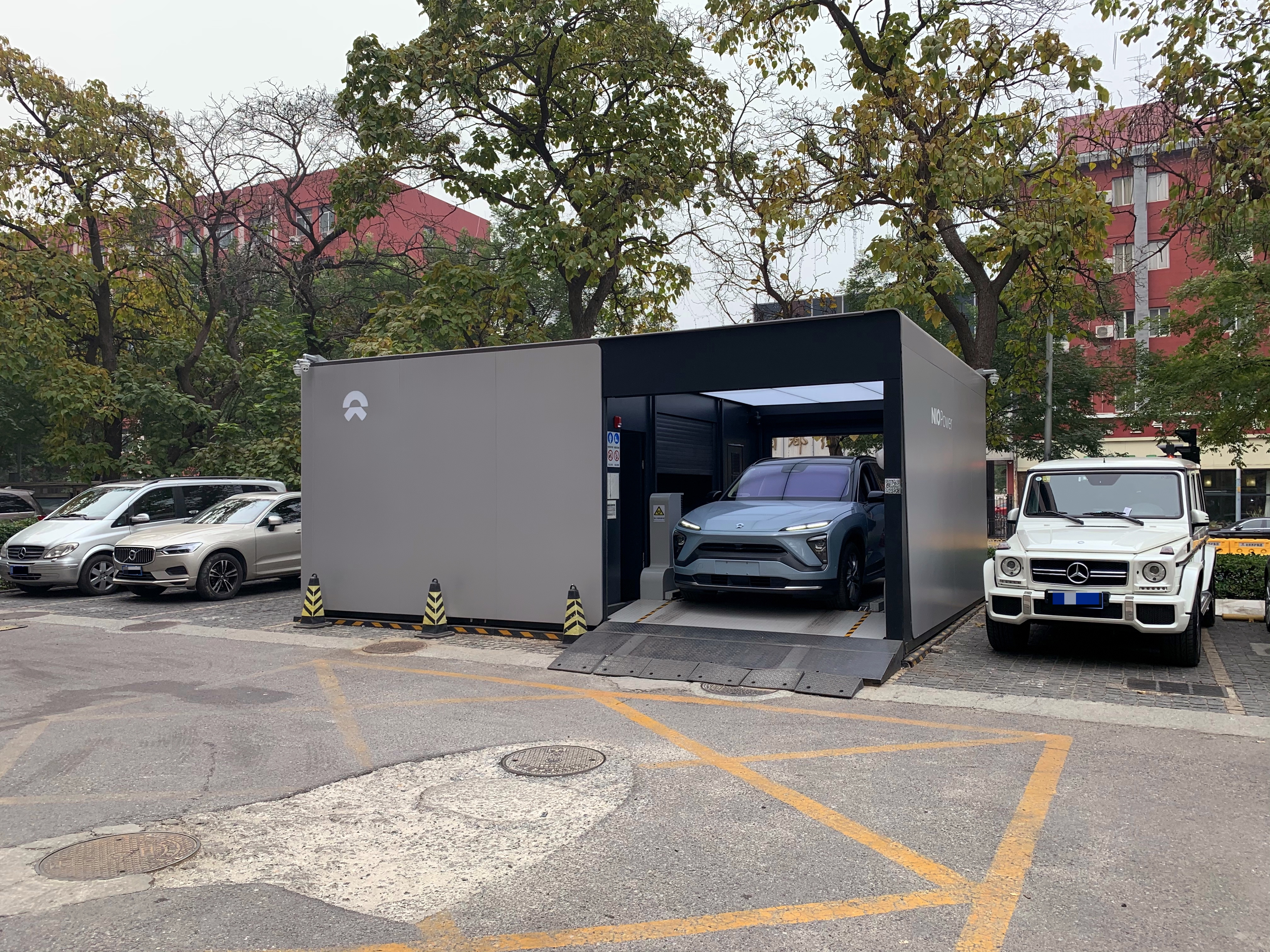
A Nio Power second-generation battery swap station in China

Nio operates an automated network of battery swapping stations that allow vehicle owners to replace or upgrade their battery packs in under five minutes. The service supports both permanent upgrades and temporary rentals and forms part of the company's wider energy system.

=== Network development ===
The first phase of Nio's swap network was completed in November 2018, with 18 stations installed at 14 sites along the 2,273 km (1,412 mi) G4 Beijing–Hong Kong and Macau Expressway, linking Beijing with the Pearl River Delta. A second phase, completed in January 2019, added eight stations along the 1,212 km (753 mi) G2 Beijing–Shanghai Expressway.

By March 2021, Nio had completed its two-millionth battery swap in Suzhou and operated 193 swap stations, 134 supercharging stations, and 327 destination stations across China. In December 2021, the company reached its goal of 700 stations ahead of schedule, after performing more than 5.3 million swaps.

By December 2022, Nio had built 1,305 stations across all provincial regions in China. The stations provided an average of 40,000 swaps per day and had completed a total of 15 million swaps. The company opened its first European swap station in Norway in 2022, and by August 2023, seven were operating in Germany. By February 2026, the network had completed 100 million swaps.

=== Technology and station design ===
Nio's second-generation stations use automated systems that park and exchange the battery while the driver remains inside the vehicle. Later versions integrate energy storage and grid-interaction functions for highway service areas.

=== Partnerships and expansion ===
Between late 2023 and early 2024, Nio signed cooperation agreements with Changan Automobile, Geely Holding, JAC Group, and Chery Automobile covering battery swapping standards, station technology, and network expansion. In March 2024, Nio Power also partnered with Zhongan Energy of Anhui Province to advance battery standards, charging technologies, and network construction.

=== Battery specifications ===
To ensure compatibility between vehicle models, all swap-compatible batteries share standardized external dimensions.

Nio's original 70 kWh NMC pack was replaced in 2021 by a 75 kWh dual-chemistry NMC/LFP design. It combined the higher energy density and cold-weather performance of NMC cells with the safety and longer lifespan of LFP cells. In 2024, the 75 kWh pack was updated to an all-LFP, module-less design supporting 170 kW DC fast charging.

In mid-2024, Nio began receiving deliveries from WeLion of its 150 kWh semi-solid-state NMC pack, with an energy density of 360 Wh/kg. The pack weighs about 20 kg more than the 100 kWh liquid pack and was initially available only for short-term rental through swap stations.

Swap-compatible battery packs
Battery capacity		Year	Supplier	Chemistry	Weight	Length	Width	Height	Peak DCFC	Voltage	Capacity
Gross	Usable	Year	Supplier	Chemistry	Weight	Length	Width	Height	Peak DCFC	Voltage	Capacity
70 kWh	—	2018	CATL	NMC	525 kg (1,157 lb)	2,062 mm (81.2 in)	1,539 mm (60.6 in)	136 mm (5.4 in)	90 kW	350 V	200 Ah
75 kWh	73.5 kWh	2021	CATL	NMC–LFP mix	535 kg (1,179 lb)	—	—	185.6 mm (7.31 in)	140 kW	386 V	195 Ah
75 kWh	73.5 kWh	2024	CATL	LFP	535 kg (1,179 lb)	—	—	185.6 mm (7.31 in)	170 kW	367 V	205 Ah
100 kWh	90.0 kWh	2019	CATL	NMC	555 kg (1,224 lb)	—	—	185.6 mm (7.31 in)	127 kW	358 V	280 Ah
100 kWh	90.0 kWh	2022	CALB	NMC	555 kg (1,224 lb)	—	—	183.1 mm (7.21 in)	127 kW	358 V	280 Ah
102 kWh	—	2025	CATL	NMC	545 kg (1,202 lb)	—	—	—	600 kW	~925 V	
150 kWh	—	2024	WeLion	NMC semi-SSB	575 kg (1,268 lb)	—	—	185.6 mm (7.31 in)	—	337 V	446 Ah
Onvo
60.6 kWh	59.0 kWh	2024	FinDreams	LFP	439 kg (968 lb)	—	—	—	150 kW	685 V	—
85.1 kWh	—	2024	CALB	NMC	440 kg (970 lb)	—	—	116 mm (4.6 in)	250 kW	792 V	—

== Technologies ==
=== Nomi AI ===
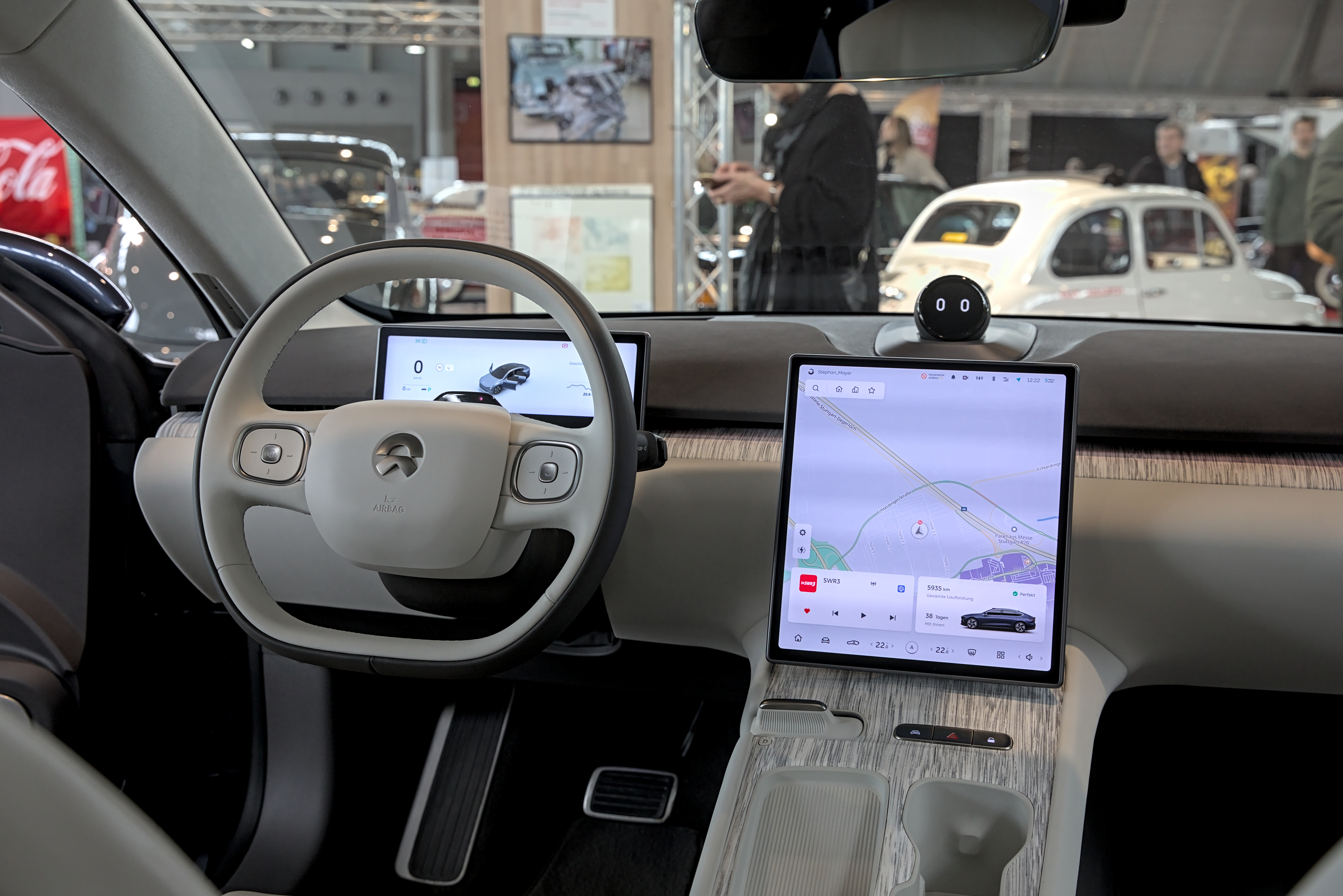
Interior of an ET7 with Nomi

Nomi is Nio's in-car digital assistant integrated into the dashboard. The company describes it as the world's first AI assistant available in a production vehicle.

The Nomi Mate 2.0 has a circular AMOLED display with an animated, human-like avatar that rotates and blinks to look toward passengers. The system uses artificial intelligence to learn driver habits and can automatically adjust seat position, steering wheel height, and cabin temperature. Drivers can also give Nomi voice commands to open windows, change the temperature, or take in-car photos displayed on the infotainment screen.

=== Nio Pilot ===
Nio Pilot is the company's SAE Level 2 semi-autonomous driving system that provides driver-assistance functions. It debuted with the ES8 model. Over-the-air software updates in 2018 and 2019 added features such as lane keeping, adaptive cruise control, lane departure warning, automatic emergency braking, highway pilot (Nio Navigate on Pilot, NNOP), traffic jam assistance, and automatic lane changes.

The system uses twenty-three sensors, including a trifocal front camera, five radars, twelve ultrasonic sensors, and a driver-monitoring camera. Nio was among the first automakers to release a production car using the Mobileye EyeQ4 vision processor.

In August 2021, a 31-year-old driver died when his Nio ES8 struck a stationary construction vehicle. The self-driving system was still in beta testing and was not designed to detect static obstacles. The vehicle manual stated that drivers must take control near construction zones. The driver's family later alleged that Nio could have altered or withheld vehicle data stored on its servers.

=== Aquila (Nio Autonomous Driving) ===
In November 2019, Nio announced a partnership with Mobileye to create a consumer car called Aquila, using Mobileye's SAE Level 4 automated driving system. The company planned to launch the model by 2022.

Aquila comprises 33 sensors, including 11 high-resolution cameras, a lidar scanner, five radar units, 12 ultrasonic sensors, and two positioning systems: one using short-range communication (V2X) and one using high-accuracy mapping (ADMS).

The system first appeared in the ET7 sedan. Nio began delivering the model in the first quarter of 2022.

=== Autonomous driving chips ===
==== Adam ====
Nio introduced the Adam autonomous driving computer with the ET7 in 2021, and deliveries began in early 2022. Adam uses four Nvidia Drive Orin processors that together provide 1,016 tera-operations per second (TOPS), a standard measure of computing performance for driver-assistance systems.

Adam is standard equipment on all Nio vehicles built on the NT 2.0 platform.

==== Shenji NX9031 ====
Nio announced the Shenji NX9031, an autonomous driving chip, at Nio Day 2023. The company said the chip was produced in July 2024, marking completion of its design phase ("tape-out").

The chip was first used in the ET9 sedan, introduced in March 2025. It has 32 Cortex-A78AE and Cortex-A65AE cores arranged in a big.LITTLE layout combining high- and low-power cores. The NX9031 provides about 615 kDMIPS, a computing performance measure. Nio stated that its performance is comparable to four Nvidia Orin-X processors used in the earlier Adam computer. Independent estimates suggest that Adam reached about 300 TOPS, while the NX9031 is estimated at around 500 TOPS.

The NX9031 integrates a 26-bit image signal processor (ISP) that handles 6.5 gigapixels per second with 5 ms latency. It uses 64GB of LPDDR5x memory at 8533 MT/s for 546 GB/s bandwidth. The chip conforms to the ISO 26262 ASIL-D safety standard, the highest level defined under that system, and employs Cortex-R52 safety cores. It contains over 50 billion transistors and is manufactured on Samsung's 5 nm process.

On 26 February 2026, Nio announced that its chip subsidiary, Anhui Shenji Technology Co., Ltd., had completed its first round of equity financing, raising over RMB 2.2 billion and valuing the company at nearly RMB 10 billion post-investment. This financing brought together several industrial capital firms and leading industry institutions, including Hefei State-owned Capital Venture Investment, Hefei Haiheng, IDG Capital, SMIC Capital, and Yuanhe Puhua. This will facilitate the company's continued R&D and promotion of high-end, highly competitive chip products, supporting Nio's strategic layout in areas such as autonomous driving and AI-powered devices.

In July 2026, the Shenji NX9031 used in Nio's automotive applications was renamed to NX9031X to differentiate it from new variants in the lineup.

At the 2026 World Artificial Intelligence Conference held in July, Nio chip spinoff Genitech unveiled the Shenji NX9031U, a midrange version of the NX9031X optimized for use in robotics applications. Due to the different needs of robotics applications, such as air cooling, cost, and latency, the NX9031U outputs 800TOPS and has the heterogenous core count cut down to 28 cores, while retaining same 64GB of LPDDR5x-8533 for 546GB/s of bandwidth as the NX9031X, allowing it to encode 4K video at up to 450 frames per second. At the same conference, Genitech announced the NX9031U, an entry-level version of the NX9031X intended for use in general-purpose AI applications.

==== M97 ====
The M97 is a chip codeveloped by Shenji and Axera Semiconductor and is intended to be sold to third parties. Reports emerged in March 2026 indicated that the chip had successfully been taped-out, and Axera's Hong Kong IPO prospectus indicated that the chip will be released in the third quarter of 2026. It is expected to have over 700 TOPS of performance and compete with the 560 TOPS Horizon Robotics Journey 6P. It will use the core module designs and architecture of the Shenji NX9031 chip, but with some reduced specifications.

Reports have emerged that Geely and Leapmotor are interested in using the chips.

===== Shenji 9031e =====
In March 2026, 36kr reported that Nio's spun-off chip division Genitech (Shenji) is working on a lower-end chip codenamed 9031e, which is intended to compete with the 128 TOPS Horizon Robotics J6M. It is also being codeveloped with Axera Semiconductor along with the M97.

Chip	Year	Transistors	CPU	Performance (kDMIPS)	AI compute (TOPS)	Memory	ISP throughput	Process
Adam (four Nvidia Orin-X processors)	2022	68 billion	48×Cortex-A78AE	912 k	1,016 (4×256)	4×32GB LPDDR5-6400 256-bit; 4×204.8 GB/s	7.4 GP/s	8 nm (Samsung)
Shenji NX9031X	2025	>50 billion	32×Cortex-A78AE & Cortex-A65AE (big.LITTLE)	615 k	~1000+(est.)	64GB LPDDR5x-8533 512-bit; 546.1GB/s	6.5 GP/s	5 nm (Samsung)
Shenji NX9031U	2026		32×Cortex-A78AE & Cortex-A65AE (big.LITTLE)		800	64GB LPDDR5x-8533 512-bit; 546.1GB/s	15×4K30 encode	5 nm (Samsung)
Axera M97					700+			
Shenji 9031e					128+			

== Sales ==
Year	Total	Nio	Onvo	Firefly
2018	11,348	11,348	—	—
2019	20,565	20,565	—	—
2020	43,728	43,728	—	—
2021	91,429	91,429	—	—
2022	122,486	122,486	—	—
2023	160,038	160,038	—	—
2024	221,970	201,209	20,761	—
2025	326,028	178,806	107,808	39,414

The chart below presents the quarterly sales of Nio.

View chart definition.

=== Production milestones ===
- 100,000 vehicles – 7 April 2021.
- 200,000 vehicles – 26 April 2022.
- 300,000 vehicles – 12 December 2022.
- 500,000 vehicles – 9 May 2024.
- 1,000,000 vehicles – 6 January 2026

== Divisions ==
=== Nio Phone ===
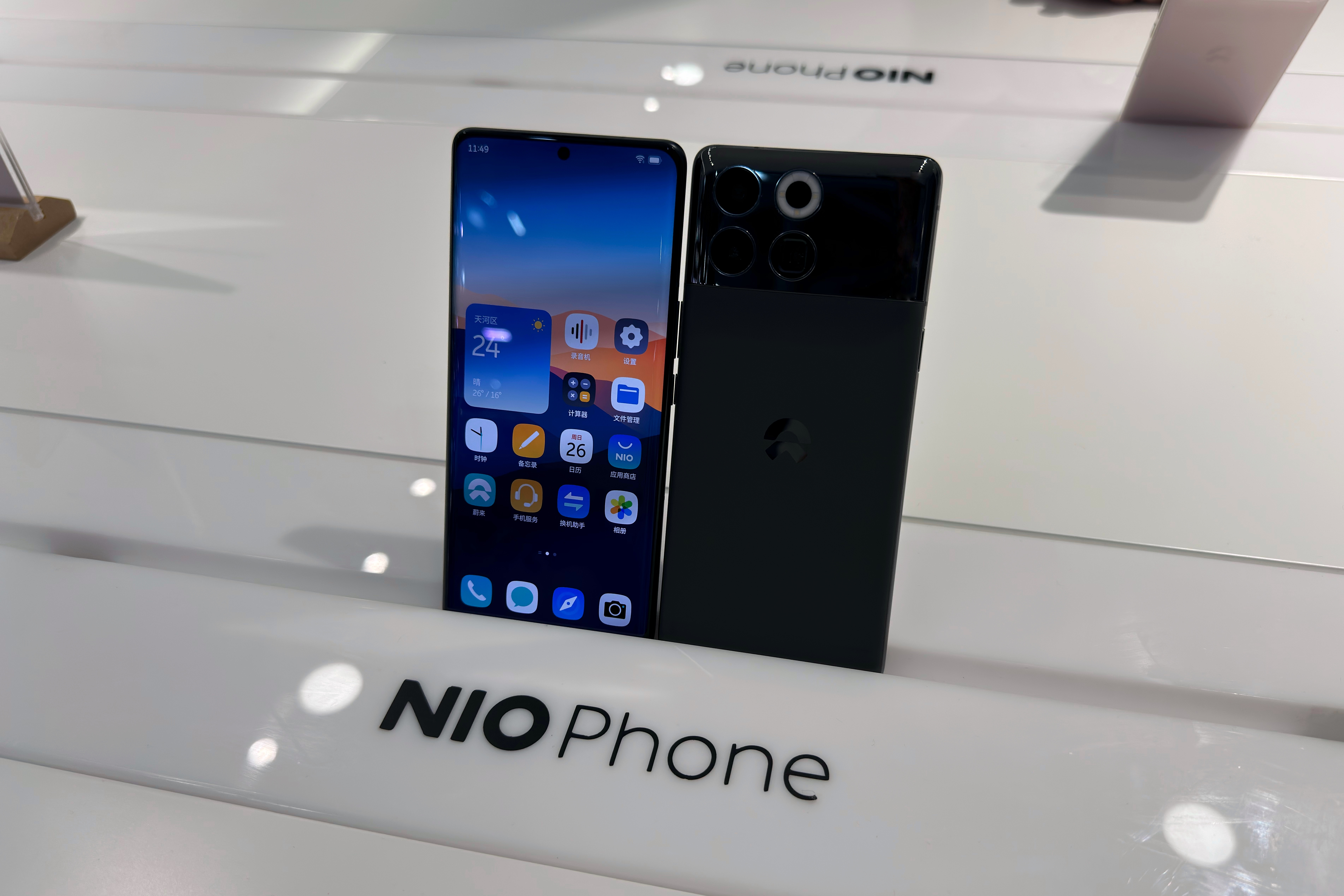
Nio Phone

On 22 February 2022, it was announced that Nio is planning to venture into China's smartphone market and preparing to make its own handsets. The company has formed a smartphone division in Shenzhen, and is hiring staff to expand the team. The move is preceded by similar plans to manufacture smartphones by automakers Geely and Volvo.

The first Nio Phone was launched in September 2023. It is powered by a Qualcomm Snapdragon 8 Gen 2 system-on-chip and has a 6.81-inch curved screen with 2K resolution from Samsung Display. The phone is equipped with a 5200 mAh battery that supports 66-watt wired charging, 50-watt wireless charging, and 10-watt reverse charging. It is equipped with an action button that allows drivers to launch over 30 functions related to their EV controls. CEO William Li believes that many competitors will learn from the smartphone innovations, however the primary interest of the automaker is likely to collect user data rather than making the phone a key contributor to revenue.

=== Nio Life ===
Nio Life is the company's design lifestyle brand. The brand launched in 2018 with a capsule collection made in collaboration with Hussein Chalayan. In 2021 Nio Life launched its sustainable fashion label "Blue Sky Lab". The label collaborated with the Parsons School of Design challenging students to create new products made of leftover car manufacturer materials and, thereby, providing opportunities for young designers.

=== Nio Service ===
Nio Service is the company's network of service centers. Nio Users can request a "pick-up-and-delivery" service for their car to the service center. Additionally, mobile service vehicles can carry out simple maintenance work on demand.

=== Nio Power ===
Nio Power is the company's network of battery swap stations, power mobile, power home and super chargers. Nio has 1,305 swap stations around China as of 31 December 2022, including 346 battery swap stations along highways. In addition to the battery swap stations, Nio has 1,223 supercharging stations in China and 1,058 destination charging stations.

=== Performance and Engineering ===
Nio's performance and engineering division has international offices including in the UK, Germany, and the USA.

=== XPT ===
XPT is a subsidiary of Nio, with locations in Nanjing, Hefei, and Shanghai. Nio bought out its minority partners in the company in November 2020, taking full ownership.

XPT designs and manufactures key components for Nio's supply chain, including the EV car motors, powertrains, and gearboxes, which are later assembled elsewhere by Nio and its assembly partners. Nio runs its XPT company as a separate business, as it intends for XPT to become a supplier for other companies in the future.

== Management ==
=== William Li ===
William Li is a Chinese business executive and entrepreneur who is the founder and CEO of Nio. In June 2021, Bloomberg Billionaires Index estimated Li's net worth to be US$7.11 billion. Li co-founded and invested in over 40 companies in the internet and automotive industries.

==== Awards and honours ====
- GQ China Entrepreneur of the Year – 2017
- China Automobile Dealers Association Person of the Year – 2017
- 2017 Top 10 Economic Personages of China
- Forbes Most Intriguing Newcomer in the Transportation Awards – 2020
- TopGear.com Electric Awards 2024: EV person of the year

=== Lihong Qin ===
Lihong Qin is a Chinese business executive. He is a co-founder and CEO of the electric car manufacturer Nio.

=== Kris Tomasson ===
Kris Tomasson is an American industrial designer and vice president of Design at Nio. He was born in New York to Marlene and Helgi Tómasson. He studied transportation design at the Art Center College of Design in Pasadena, California, and graduated with honours as a Bachelor of Science (BS). After graduation, he worked as a designer in various companies, from 1992 to 1998 for the first time for BMW, then as design director, Innovation of the Arnell Group, for The Coca-Cola Company (as Global Design Director), Gulfstream Aerospace, Ford and from April 2014 to May 2015 again for BMW, where he worked for the body design of the i-models was responsible. In June 2015, he moved from BMW to Next EV, which became Nio. The design studio where Tomasson is based is located in Munich/Bogenhausen.

=== Hui Zhang ===
Hui Zhang is vice president Nio Europe. He manages both the German and UK locations of the electric car manufacturer. After studying in Beijing and Utah, Hui Zhang completed his MBA in International Management at Pforzheim University of Applied Sciences in 2002. Initially, he worked in purchasing and supply chain management at VOITH AG in China and Germany. After positions at Kiekert AG as Vice general manager and at Lotus as general manager from 2011, he was responsible for the Business Group Industry and Healthcare China at Leoni AG as a China Board Member from 2014. Hui Zhang is Deputy Chairman of the Chinese Chamber of Commerce in Germany.

== Motorsport ==
=== Formula E ===
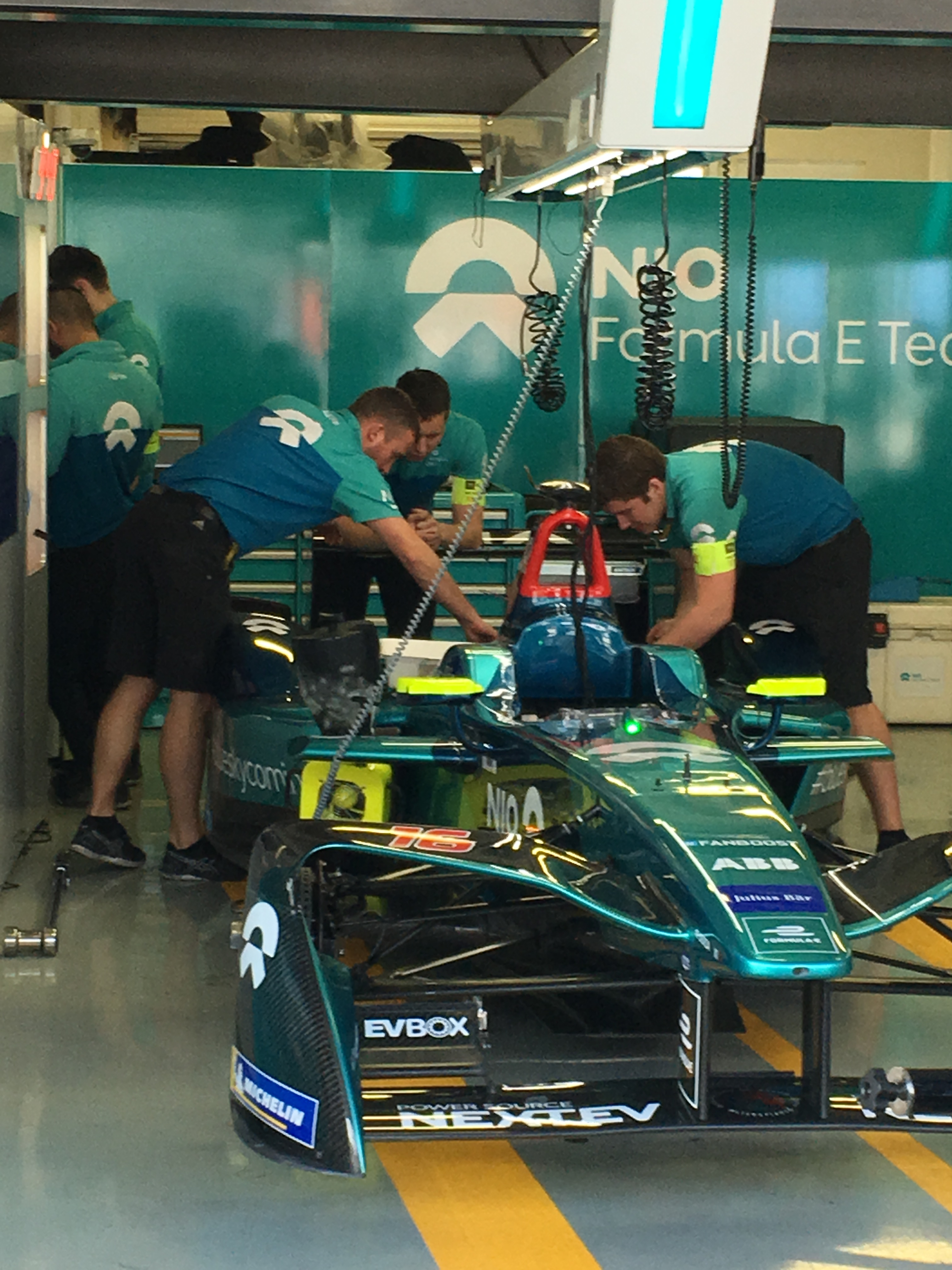
Nio have been participating in the ABB FIA Formula E since 2014, the inaugural season.

The Nio team is one of the original Formula E teams, originally competing under the name Team China Racing. Before the first season was completed, they rebranded as NEXTEV TCR. In this inaugural season, their main driver Nelson Piquet Jr. became the FIA Formula E Driver's Champion, after winning two races in Long Beach and Moscow. The team was only able to achieve fourth in the constructor's championship though, in part due to a rotating line-up of second drivers that did not achieve as consistent a level of success as Piquet.

From season 2 onwards, Formula E opened up car development, with teams creating their own powertrains. Nio used their own design NEXTEV powertrain, but it saw a downturn in the team's performance for the constructor's championship, as they finished only ninth in season 2, sixth in season 3 and eighth in season 4. By this point, the team had morphed through NEXTEV, NEXTEV Nio until renamed simply Nio. Season 5 would see the team's meagre successes diminish further, as they languished eleventh and last in the championship.

For season 6 (2019–20) the team was sold on to Lisheng Racing and renamed Nio 333 Racing. For the first time since season 1, Nio did not provide their own powertrain for the car, instead using the previous year's Dragon powertrain. It was rebranded under Nio's name and they remained classified as a manufacturer. This failed to change the team's fortunes, as they would go on to have their worst ever season, with neither Oliver Turvey nor Ma Qinghua being able to score any points in 2020. In season seven Nio improved marginally, as whilst Turvey and new arrival Tom Blomqvist amassed a total of 19 points throughout the campaign, the squad still remained in last place.

Nio once again changed their driver line-up for the 2021–22 Formula E season, as Blomqvist made way for former Red Bull and Williams junior Dan Ticktum.

The team ended its Formula E involvement after the 2022–23 season, with the team being rebranded as ERT Formula E Team for the 2023–24 season.

=== World records ===
Nio set five records in their track-only EP9 for the fastest lap for an electric-powered car in the Nürburgring Nordschleife, Circuit Paul Ricard, Circuit of the Americas, and Shanghai International Circuit tracks.

== Public listing ==
In September 2018, Nio listed on NYSE after raising about $1 billion selling American depositary shares at $6.26 apiece. The shares started trading under the symbol NIO.

In 2018, while Nio was preparing for an IPO, the company told investors that they were building a new factory in Shanghai. Then in March 2019, Nio disclosed that the factory would never be built. According to former employees, construction had never started. Investors sued and accused Nio's promoters, which included Morgan Stanley and Goldman Sachs, of negligence in examining Nio's financial statements.

In 2020 Nio received a significant investment from the Chinese government to help it survive. In 2023, it was investigated by the SEC over disclosure of CCP officials in key positions. Although Nio's stock price on the NYSE has risen in August and September 2023, it has yet to make a net profit and underperformed Q2 expectations.

== See also ==
- Automobile manufacturers and brands of China
- List of automobile manufacturers of China
- Automotive industry in China
- New energy vehicles in China
- XPeng
- Li Auto
- Leapmotor
- Harmony Intelligent Mobility Alliance
- Xiaomi Auto
