= William Li =

Chinese businessman

- 李斌
- Born: August 9, 1974 (age 52); Anhui, China
- Other name: Li Bin
- Education: Peking University (LLB)
- Occupation: Businessman
- Known for: Founder of Nio

William Li, also known as Li Bin, (李斌; born 1974) is a Chinese businessman and entrepreneur. He is co-founder and CEO of Nio Inc., an electric vehicle company headquartered in Shanghai.

== Career ==
Bitauto Holdings Ltd. was founded by Li in 2000. It was Li's first major company, where he served as CEO and chairman. He sold the company in 2013.

In November 2014, Li co-founded Nio Inc., an electric car company. In 2018, the company opened publicly on the New York Stock Exchange. In 2021, NIO expanded outside China, selling cars in Norway.
