= Nio ET9 =

Battery electric full-size luxury sedan

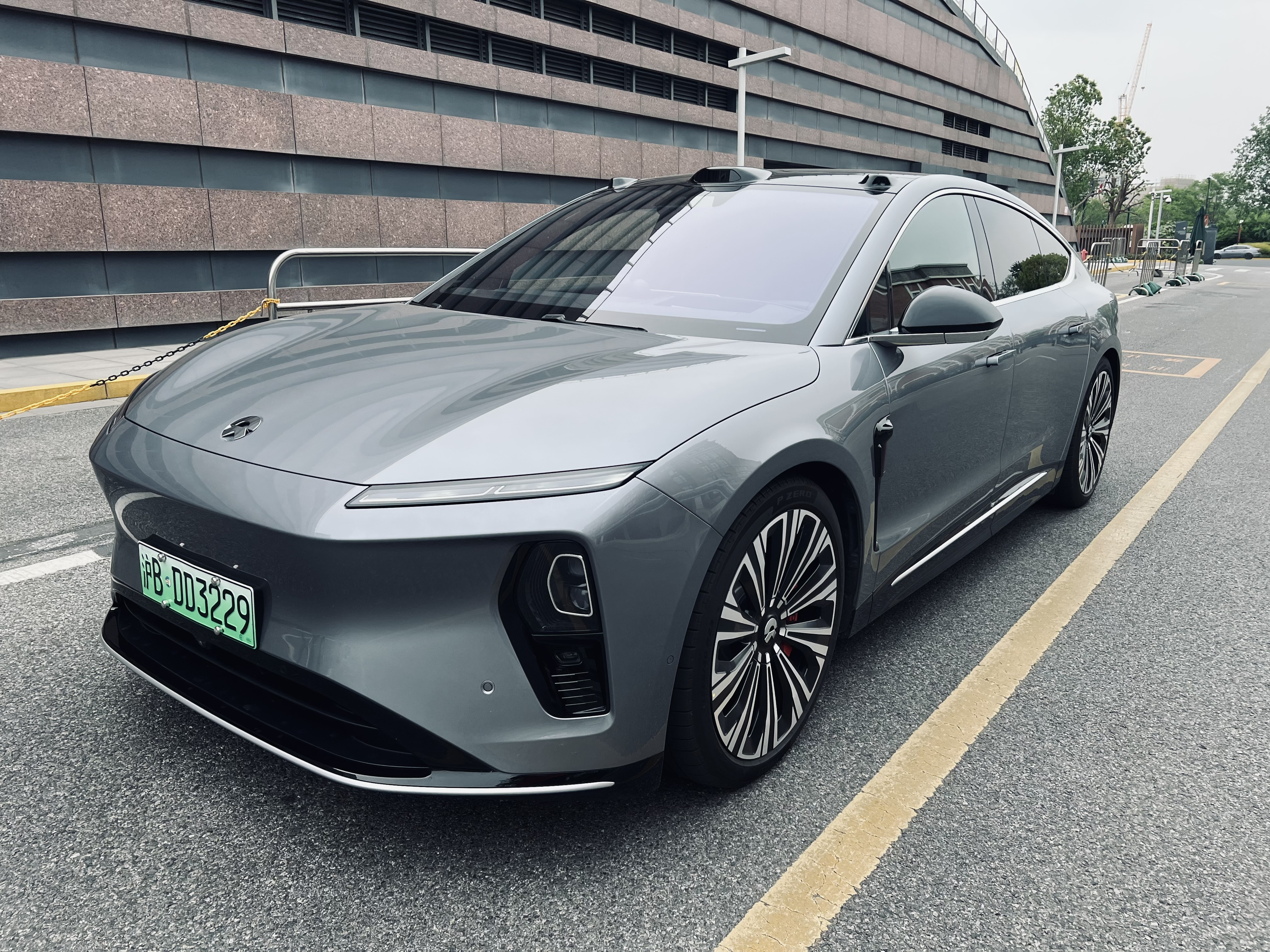

Overview
- Manufacturer: Nio Inc.
- Production: 2025–present
- Assembly: China: Hefei, Anhui
- Designer: Kris Tomasson

Body and chassis
- Class: Full-size luxury car (F)
- Body style: 4-door sedan
- Layout: Dual-motor, all-wheel-drive
- Platform: NT 3.0

Powertrain
- Electric motor: 340 kW permanent magnet synchronous; 180 kW AC induction
- Power output: 697 hp (520 kW; 707 PS)
- Battery: 100 kWh NMC CATL
- Electric range: 650 km (400 mi) (CLTC)
- Plug-in charging: 600 kW DC

Dimensions
- Wheelbase: 3,250 mm (128.0 in)
- Length: 5,325 mm (209.6 in)
- Width: 2,017 mm (79.4 in)
- Height: 1,621 mm (63.8 in)
- Curb weight: 2,379 kg (5,245 lb)

The Nio ET9 is a battery electric full-size luxury sedan produced by Chinese electric car company Nio. It is the first Nio vehicle to use the NT 3.0 platform and self-developed Shenji autonomous driving chip, and serves as the brand's flagship vehicle. It is also the first production car to use steer-by-wire technology and a fully 900 V electrical architecture in China.

== Overview ==
A pre-production version of the Nio ET9 was initially revealed in China on December 23, 2023 at the 'Nio Day 2023' event at Xi'an's Olympic Sports Center, after which pre-orders for the ET9 opened. At the 'Nio Day 2024' event held at Guangzhou on December 21, 2024, the production version of the ET9 was revealed with notable changes to its design, along with significantly more information about features and pricing. Deliveries of the ET9 are expected to begin in late March 2025, with a starting price of CN¥ 788,000 (US$108,800), or CN¥ 660,000 (US$91,200) and CN¥ 1,128 (US$155) monthly with a battery subscription plan.

The ET9 is an F-segment four-seater full-size luxury liftback sedan with a length of 5,325 millimetres (209.6 in) and a wheelbase of 3,250 millimetres (128 in), which is close to the 3,300-millimetre (130 in) maximum wheelbase that third generation Nio battery swap stations can accommodate, and is too long to be compatible with first and second generation stations. It is the second vehicle to be built on the NT 3.0 platform after the Onvo L60, and uses fully 900 V powertrain components, the first to do so in China.

A limited edition of the ET9 called the First Edition became available for pre-order after the Nio Day 2024 event on December 21, 2024, and all 999 units were sold within 12 hours. It features unique logos placed throughout the vehicle, and comes standard with normally optional features such as 23-inch wheels. After continued demand for special editions, Nio launched the ET9 Signature Edition several days later on December 26. It features unique logos placed throughout the vehicle, and comes standard with normally optional features such as 23-inch wheels.

It features a SkyRide fully active suspension.

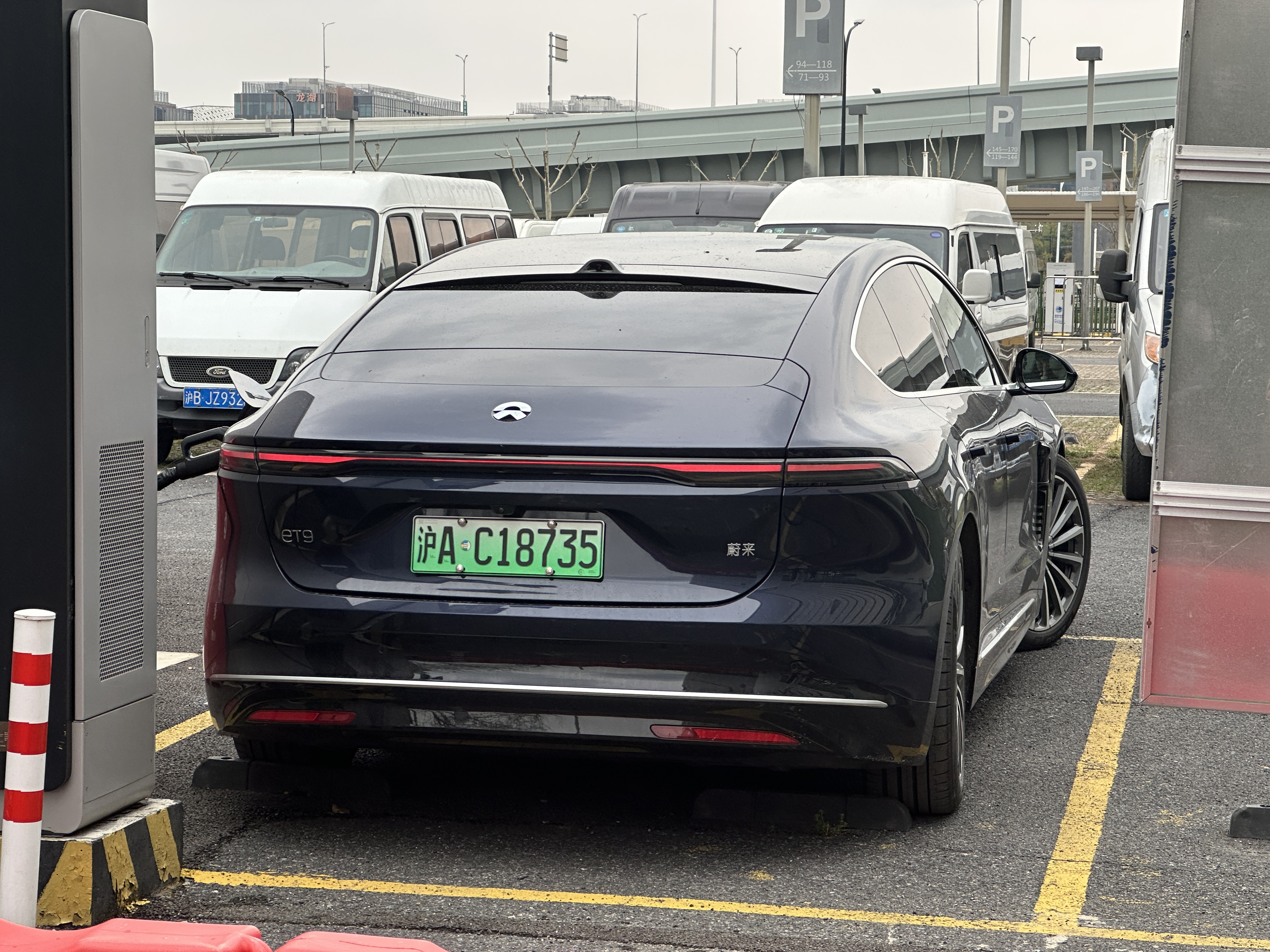
Rear view

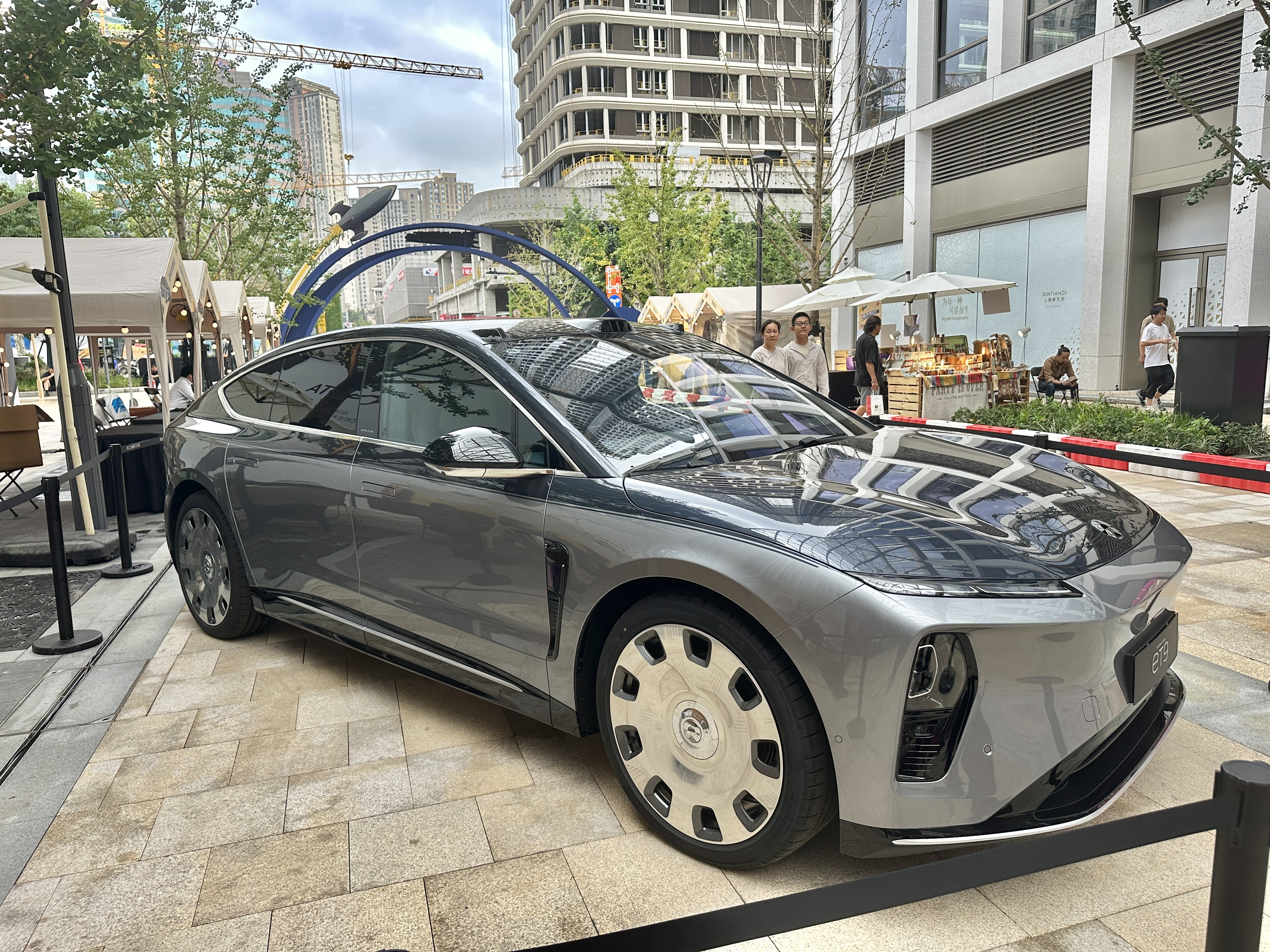
Nio ET9 Horizon

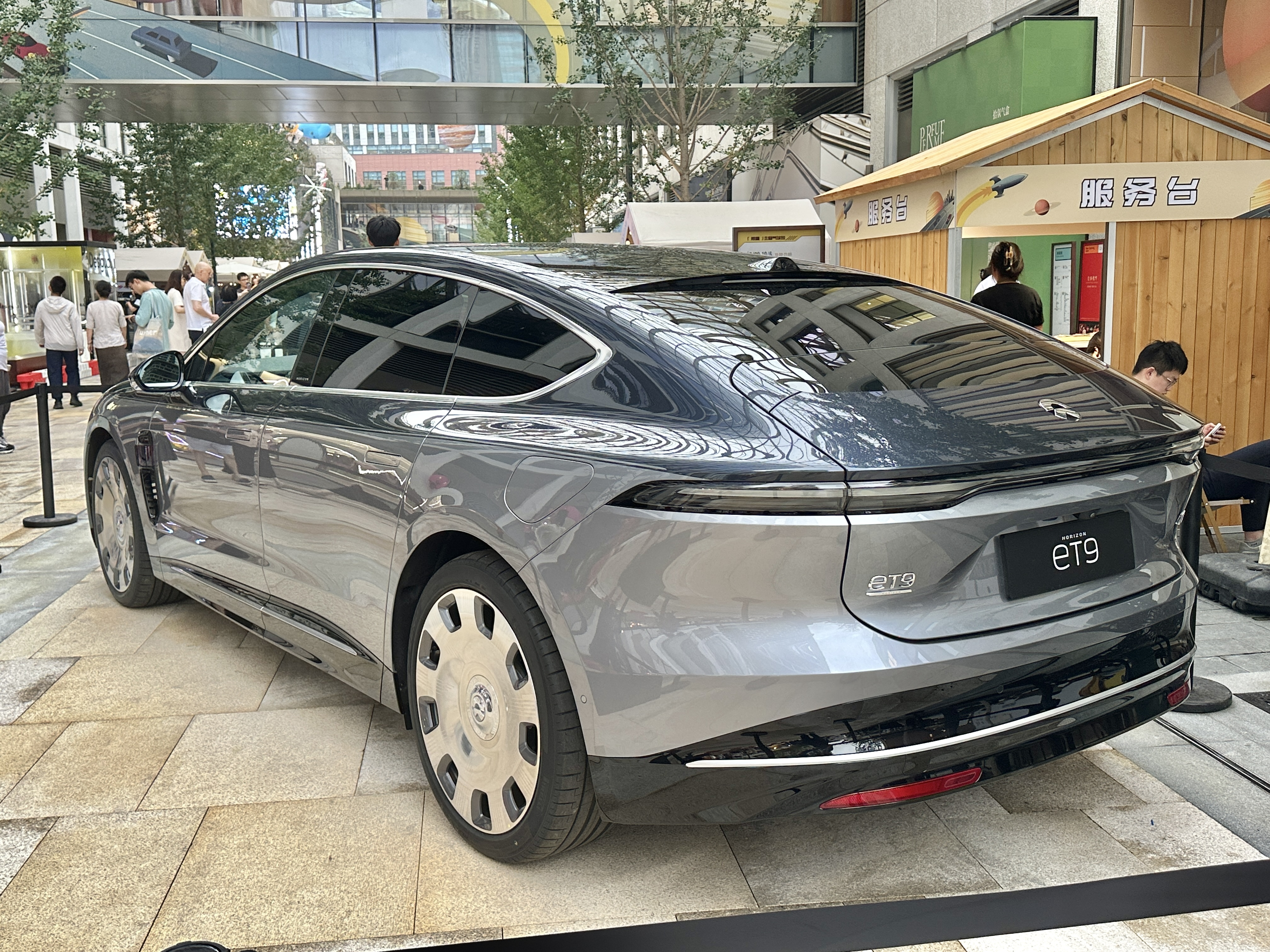
Rear view

== Autonomous driving system ==
The ET9 has the first implementation of Nio's self-developed 5 nm Shenji NX9031 autonomous driving chip. According to Nio, each of the ET9's two Shenji chips has higher computational ability than the previous 1016 TOP Adam system, which consists of four NVIDIA Orin-X chips. It has a total of 31 sensors in its autonomous driving sensor suite called Aquila 2.0, including 360-degree camera coverage. The ET9 features Nio's first use of 4-dimension mmWave radars, which are capable of measuring elevation in addition to azimuth, range, and velocity like conventional 3-dimension radars. It has two side-facing LiDAR units mounted on the front fenders, which have a range of up to 150 metres (490 ft), along with a front-facing roof mounted unit which allows for 350-degree LiDAR coverage.

== Active suspension system ==
The ET9's SkyRide intelligent chassis system incorporates a hydraulic fully active suspension developed by U.S.-based company ClearMotion. This system, known as ClearMotion1, utilizes electro-hydraulic actuators at each wheel to adapt to road conditions in real time, enhancing ride comfort and stability. ClearMotion1 can reduce in-cabin motion by approximately 75% compared to existing technologies, responding to road inputs within milliseconds. At the ET9's launch, Nio demonstrated the suspension's capabilities by driving over speed bumps with a tower of champagne glasses on the hood, none of which spilled. In December 2023, ClearMotion announced a production order from Nio for three million units of its ClearMotion1 suspension system, marking the ET9 as the first model to feature this technology. Deliveries of the ET9 with active suspension began in the first quarter of 2025.

== Powertrain ==
The ET9 is the first vehicle to use Nio's Thunder EDS (electric drive system), which is the first in China to use a mass produced global 900 V electrical architecture, which includes the traction motors, battery, drive power supply electronics, and HVAC system. The single powertrain option is a dual-motor all-wheel drive system with a total output of 697 hp (520 kW; 707 PS) and 700 N⋅m (520 lb⋅ft) of torque. It uses a 79 kg permanent magnet synchronous motor with W-pin (continuous wave) windings for higher efficiency and smaller dimensions, and runs at 925V to output 340 kW (460 hp; 460 PS) to the rear wheels, for a power density of 4.3 kW/kg. It also has a 180 kW (240 hp; 240 PS) AC induction motor powering the front wheels, with a power density of 2.6 kW/kg, which Nio claims is the world's highest for the motor type. Power is fed to the motors through a 1200V silicon carbide inverter with a power density of 1315 kW/L.

The ET9 is powered by a swappable 100 kWh battery with an energy density of 292 Wh/kg using Nio's self-developed 46105 cylindrical format battery cells. The high pack voltage allows for the battery to be charged by 500–1000 V DC fast chargers at a peak power of 600 kW and a peak current of 772 A, allowing for 5C charging rates. The battery can be swapped at a fourth generation Nio swap station in 144 seconds, and provides a CLTC range rating of 650 kilometres (400 mi).

== Sales ==
Sales	China
2025	2,943
