= Hilton (surname) =

The word Hilton or Hylton is a place name of English and Norwegian origin, which is also the source of a toponymic surname. At the time of the British Census of 1881, the frequency of the surname Hilton was highest in Lancashire (5.3 times the British average), followed by Sussex, Lincolnshire, Westmorland, Cheshire, Norfolk and Bedfordshire. Its frequency was below national average in all the other British counties. Sometimes Hilton is found as a given name.

== Hilton Hotel dynasty ==
Members of the Hilton family associated with Conrad Hilton who founded Hilton hotels. This family take their name from a farm near Kløfta in Ullensaker, Norway.

- Conrad Nicholson Hilton Sr (1887–1979)

- Conrad Nicholson "Nicky" Hilton, Jr. (1926–1969)

- Conrad Nicholson Hilton III, born 1960
- Michael Otis Hilton, born 1961

- William Barron Hilton (1927–2019)

- William Barron Hilton Jr, born 1948
- Hawley Anne Hilton, born 1949
- Steven Michael Hilton, born 1950

- Nicholas Conrad Hilton, born 1984

- David Alan Hilton, born 1952
- Sharon Constance Hilton, born 1953
- Richard Howard Hilton, born 1955, married to Kathy Hilton

- Paris Whitney Hilton, born 1981
- Nicholai "Nicky" Olivia Hilton, born 1983
- Barron Nicholas Hilton, born 1989
- Conrad Hughes Hilton, born 1994

- Daniel Kevin Hilton, born 1962
- Ronald Jeffrey Hilton, born 1963

- Eric Michael Hilton, born 1932
- Constance Francesca Hilton, (1947–2015)

== Other people ==
Other people named Hilton or Hylton

- Alex Hilton (1964–2026), Canadian boxer
- Alfred B. Hilton (c. 1842–1864), American Civil War soldier and Medal of Honor recipient
- Chris Hilton Jr. (born 2002), American football player
- Clifford L. Hilton (1866–1946), American jurist
- Daisy and Violet Hilton (1908–1969), English conjoined twins
- D'Arcy Fowlis Hilton (1889–1973), Canadian pilot
- Dave Hilton, multiple people
- Donna Hylton (20th century), Jamaican-American kidnapper and murderer
- Doug Hilton (born 1964), Australian scientist
- Edward Hilton (c. 1840–1922), survivor of the siege of Lucknow
- Elliot Hilton (born 1989), British figure skater
- Frederick George Hilton Price (1842–1909), English antiquarian and banker, known as F. G. Hilton Price
- Gary Hilton (born 1946), American serial killer
- Geoff Hilton (born 1947), Australian politician
- Harold Hilton (1869–1942), English golfer
- Henry Hilton (1824–1899), American Businessman and judge
- Herman Hilton (1894–1947), English rugby league footballer
- Isabel Hilton (born 1947), Scottish journalist
- Jack Hilton or John Hilton, multiple people
- James Hilton, multiple people
- Jennifer Hilton (born 1936), Baroness Hilton of Eggardon, Labour peer, former metropolitan police commander.
- Jim Hilton (1930–2008), Canadian businessman, advertiser and singer
- Joe Hilton, multiple people
- Karen Hilton, British ballroom dancer
- Keith Hylton, American lawyer
- LeSesne Hilton (1935-1987), American folk singer and actor
- Lynn M. Hilton (1924–2020), American politician
- Malcolm Hilton (1928–1990), Lancashire left arm spin bowler
- Marcus Hilton, British ballroom dancer
- Matthew Hilton, multiple people
- Millie Hylton (1870–1920), English actress and male impersonator
- Nick Hilton (born 1983), Canadian politician
- Orrin N. Hilton (c. 1849–1932), Colorado attorney and judge
- Paul Hilton, multiple people
- Perez Hilton (born 1978), professional name of American blogger and media personality Mario Lavandeira (born 1978)
- Peter J. Hilton (1923–2010), British mathematician and codebreaker
- Sir Peter Hilton (1919–1995), former Lord Lieutenant of Derbyshire
- Richard Hilton (British Army officer) (1894–1978), British soldier, pilot, and author
- Robyn Hilton (born 1944), American actress
- Rodney Hilton (1916–2002), English Marxist historian
- Roger Hilton (1911–1975), British painter
- Ronnie Hilton (1926–2001), British singer and radio presenter
- Rose Hilton (1931–2019), British painter
- Scott Hilton, multiple people
- Simon Hilton (born 1967), English music film director and editor
- Tyler Hilton (born 1983), American singer-songwriter and actor
- T. Y. Hilton (born 1989), American football wide receiver
- Vitorino Hilton (born 1977), Brazilian footballer
- William Hilton, multiple people
- Baron Hylton, a British peerage
- Brigitte Foster-Hylton (born 1974), Jamaican hurdler
- Jack Hylton (1892–1965), British bandleader and impresario
- James Hylton (1934–2018), NASCAR racer
- Javine Hylton (born 1981), British singer also known as simply Javine
- Leslie Hylton (1905–1955), West Indian cricketer
- Ripton Joseph Hylton, the reggae singer Eek-A-Mouse
