= Hylton-Foster =

Hylton-Foster is a surname. Notable people include:

- Audrey Hylton-Foster, Baroness Hylton-Foster (1908–2002), daughter of Douglas Clifton Brown, 1st Viscount
- Harry Hylton-Foster (1905–1965), British Conservative Party politician
- Jason R Hylton-Foster (1981-Present) Canadian Businessman and Entrepreneur, Vice President Business Development BRS Resources (CSE:BRS)

== See also ==
- Hilton (surname)
- Foster (surname)
