= Zakhmi Dil =

Zakhmi Dil ("Wounded Heart") may refer to:

- Zakhmi Dil (1981 film), Hindi dubbed version of Punjabi-language Indian film Giddha
- Zakhmi Dil (1984 film), an Indian film directed by Raju Subramaniam
- Zakhmi Dil, a pen-name used by Richard Hilton

== See also ==
- Zakham (disambiguation)
