= Nio EP9 =

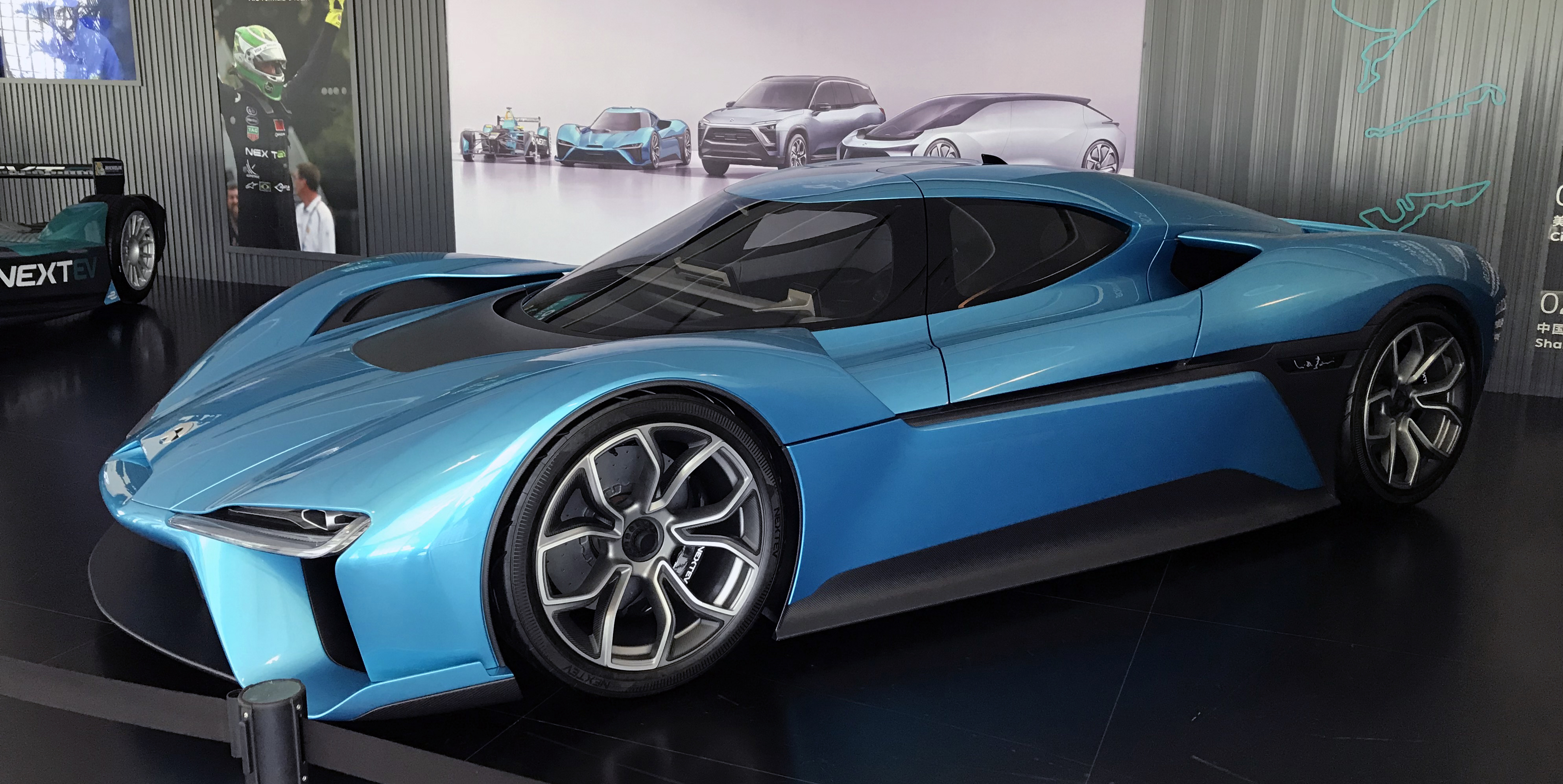

Overview
- Manufacturer: Nio; NextEV Nio Formula E Team; RML Group
- Also called: NextEV EP9
- Production: 2016–2019; (6 produced total, 10 more planned)
- Designer: David Hilton, Ben Payne, Andrew Sheffield

Body and chassis
- Class: Track day car; Sports car (S)
- Body style: 2-door coupé
- Layout: individual-wheel drive

Powertrain
- Electric motor: Indirectly water-cooled motors (one motor at each wheel)
- Power output: 250 kW (335.25 hp) each wheel; 1 MW (1,341 hp; 1,360 PS) total
- Transmission: 4 individual single-ratio transmissions (one gearbox at each wheel)
- Battery: lithium ion batteries
- Electric range: 427 km (265 mi)

Dimensions
- Length: 4,888 mm (192.4 in)
- Width: 2,230 mm (88 in)
- Height: 1,150 mm (45 in)
- Curb weight: 1,735 kg (3,825 lb)

The Nio EP9 is a battery-powered, two-seat sports car manufactured by RML Group on behalf of Chinese electric car company Nio. Although it is a track-use only car, it was not developed with assistance from Nio's Formula E racing division. The name EP9 stands for Electric Performance 9.

== History ==
The EP9 was developed and built in 18 months, and debuted at the Saatchi Gallery in London, England on November 21, 2016.

Six EP9s have been sold to Nio investors for £2,500,000 each. Nio has announced that ten additional EP9s will be sold to the general public.

However, it is not a road-legal vehicle, and none of the 16-production model EP9s were ever registered for road use. The EP9 is purely designed for track use only and does not comply with the laws and regulations to be registered in China. None of the 16-production model EP9s were ever exported and registered for road use outside China so far.

== Specifications ==
Each of the EP9's wheels has its own motor and transmission. Each motor has 250 kW (335.25 hp), giving the car a total power output of 1 MW (1,341 hp; 1,360 PS). The EP9 is both all-wheel drive, and individual-wheel drive. The car has an advanced torque vectoring system that can adjust the power output to each wheel.

The EP9's battery can last up to 427 km (265 miles) before it needs to be charged. Recharging takes 45 minutes, and battery replacement takes 8 minutes as the batteries need to be removed when recharged.

The car is equipped with an active suspension, including a ride height controller that makes 200 calculations per second.

The car's brakes are developed and constructed by U.K manufacture Alcon.

The car's chassis construction is all carbon fibre, and is based on the FIA Le Mans Prototype regulations. The exterior is also made of the same material.

The vehicle's batteries weigh 635 kg (1,400 lb). All of the carbon fibre in the car, in total, weighs 364 kg (802 lb). The total weight of the car is 1,735 kg (3,825 lb).

== Performance ==
The EP9 can accelerate from 0 to 100 km/h (62 mph) in 2.7 seconds, 200 km/h (124 mph) in 7.1 seconds, and 300 km/h (186 mph) in 15.9 seconds, as demonstrated by Richard Hammond in The Grand Tour. The car can achieve a top speed of 313 km/h (194 mph).

The EP9 can also brake at a very short distance, as Richard Hammond (who had compared its acceleration to two vehicles he had famously crashed, a Rimac Concept One and the jet-powered dragster) demonstrated at the Eboladrome.

The car is somewhat capable of autonomous driving, which it did when the car set a record for fastest autonomous driving at the Circuit of the Americas. However, this was only possible because it was configured to drive autonomously.

== Design ==
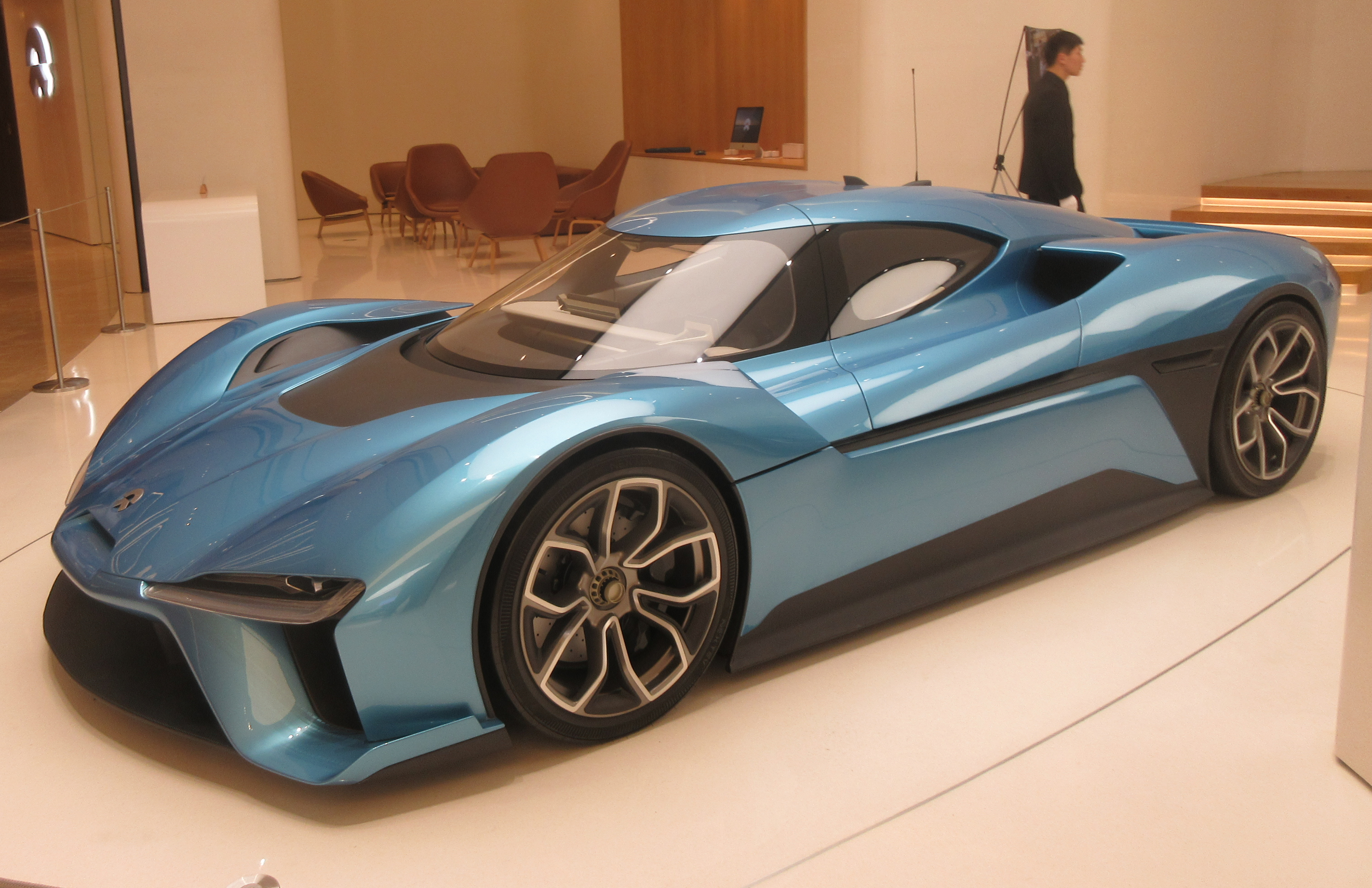
Nio EP9

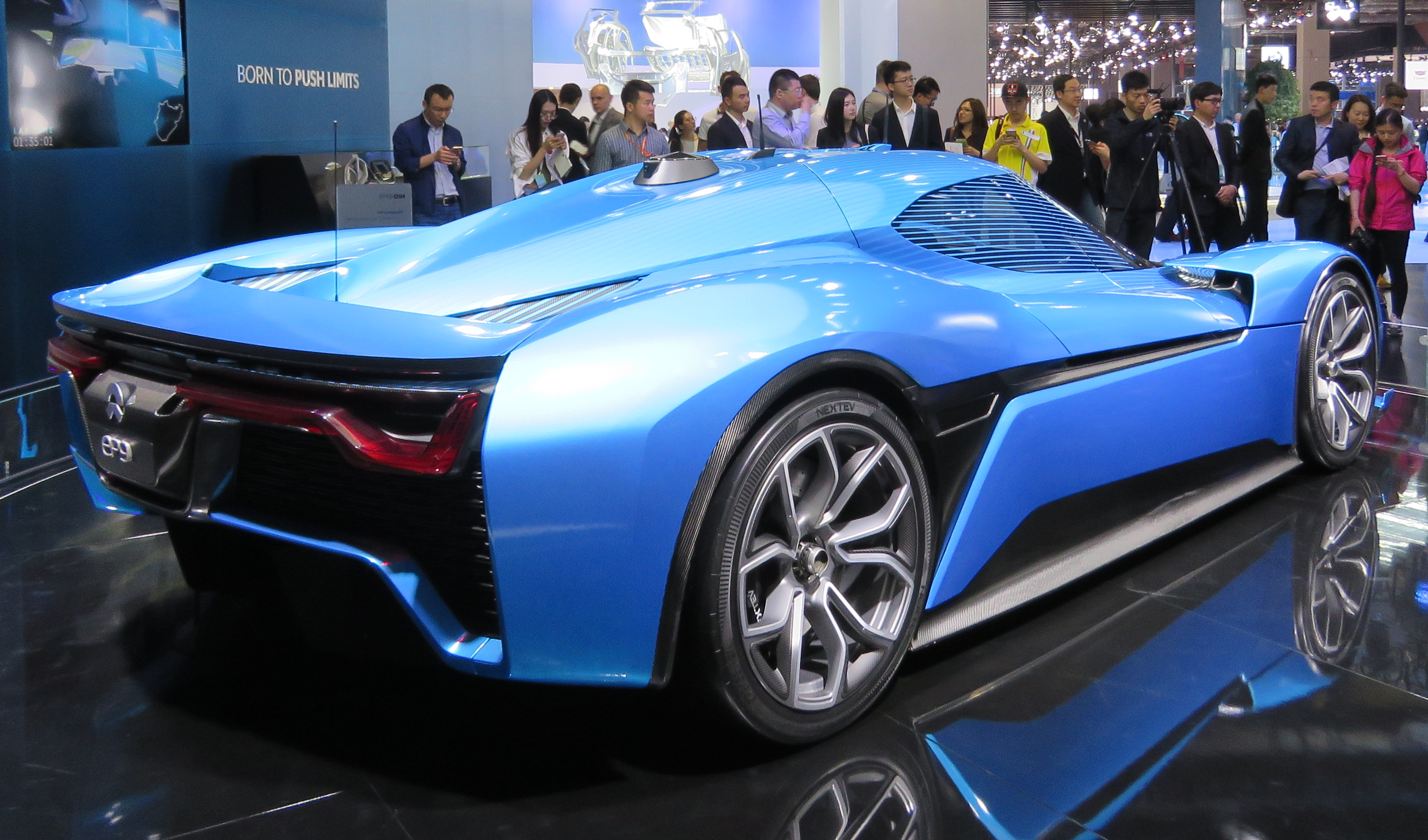
Rear view of the Nio EP9

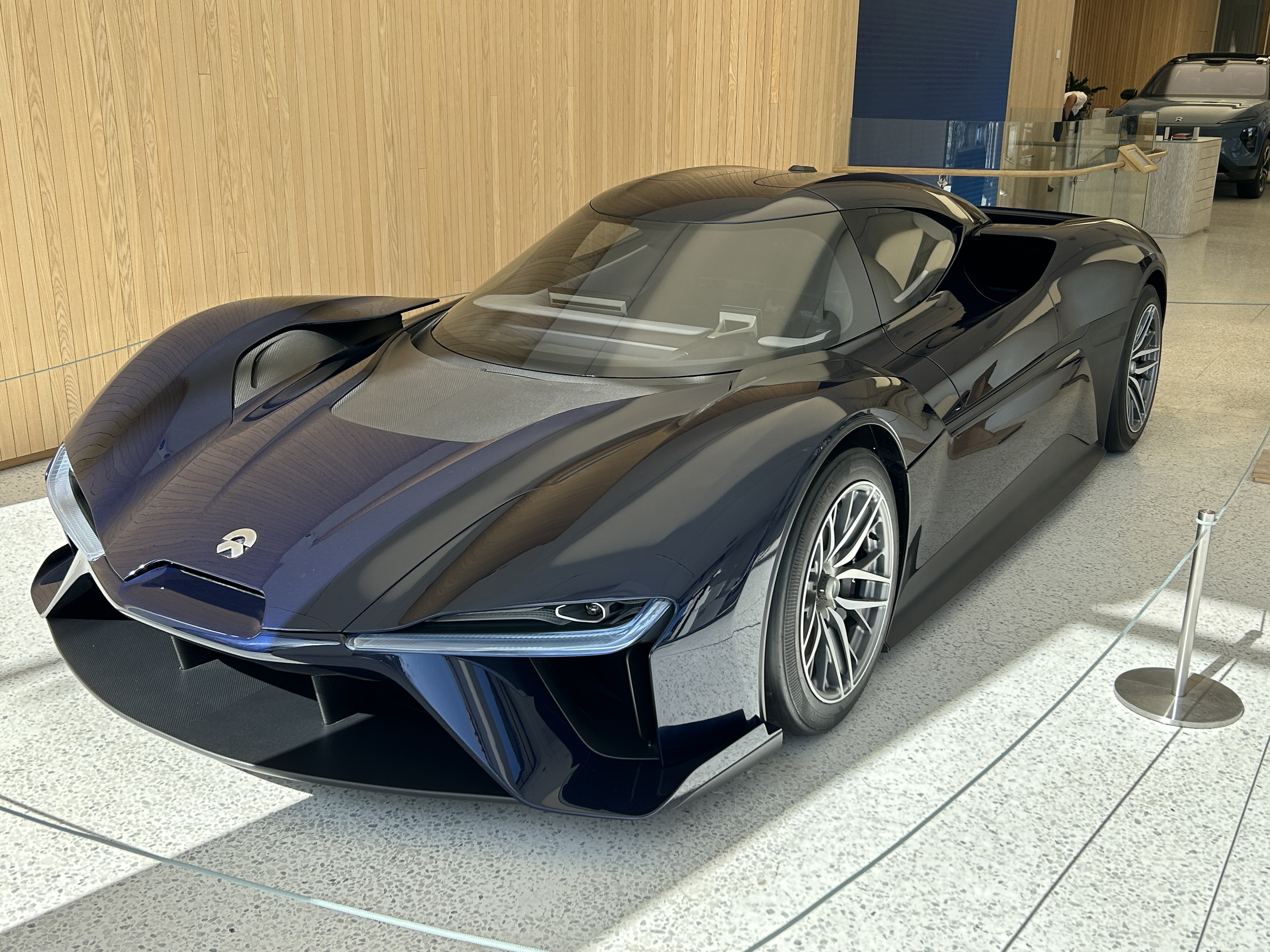
Nio EP9 in dark blue

The EP9's chief designer was David Hilton, who was also Nio's former senior design director.

=== Exterior ===
The EP9's rear wing is adjustable between three settings: parked, low-drag, and high-downforce. The EP9 produces 24,000 newtons (5,395 lbs or 2447 kg) of downforce at 240 km/h (149 mph), similar to a Formula One car, allowing the EP9 to corner at 3.0 Gs.

=== Interior ===
The interior, like the exterior and chassis, is made entirely of carbon fibre. There are four screens: one on the driver's side of the dashboard, one on the passenger's side of the dashboard, one on the centre console, and one on the steering wheel.

- Dashboard screens - Both screens display performance data, but differ in function. The passenger-side screen displays only four measurements: the car's top speed, lap time, and lateral G-forces, and the driver's heart rate.
- Centre console screen - Displays performance data, lap times, and a track map with the car's current position.
- Steering wheel screen - The steering wheel is a simplified version of Nio's Formula E racing wheel, and is built by the same company.

== World records ==
The EP9 set the record for the fastest lap by an electric vehicle for the Circuit of the Americas, Shanghai International Circuit and the Circuit Paul Ricard tracks. It also set the record for the fastest lap by an autonomous vehicle at the Circuit of the Americas track.

Track	Lap Time	References
Circuit Paul Ricard	1:52.78	
Circuit of the Americas	2:11.30 (driver); 2:40.33 (auto)	
Shanghai International Circuit	2:01.11	

The EP9 used racing slicks for all of the record attempts.

== See also ==
- List of production cars by power output
- Aspark Owl
- Rimac Concept One
- Tesla Roadster (2020)
- Volkswagen I.D. R
- Lotus Evija
- McMurtry Spéirling
