= Ford S-Max =

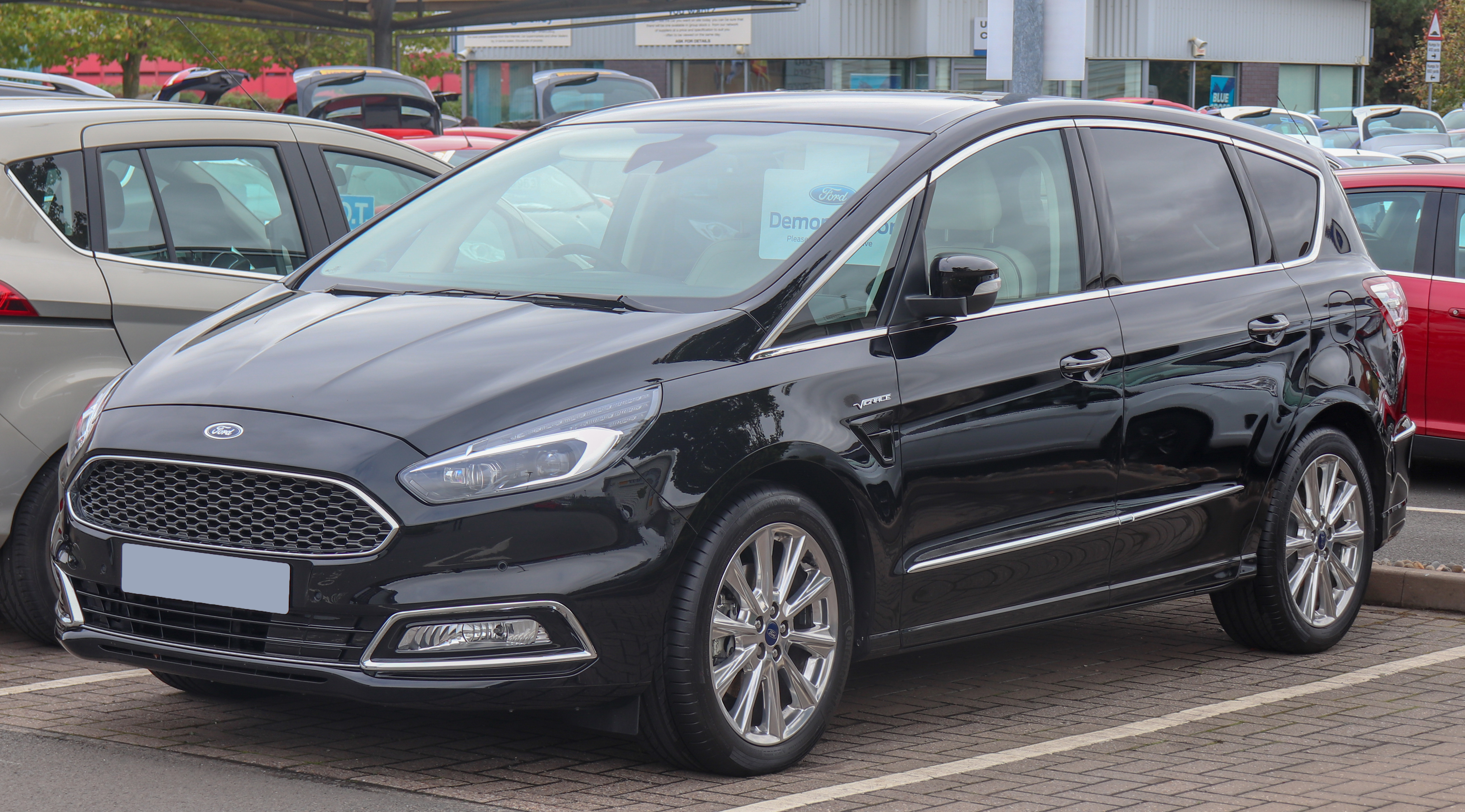

Overview
- Manufacturer: Ford Europe
- Production: May 2006 – April 2023

Body and chassis
- Class: Large MPV (M)
- Body style: 5-door MPV
- Related: Ford Galaxy; Ford Edge; Ford Mondeo

The Ford S-Max (stylized as Ford S-MAX) is a mid-size MPV that was produced by Ford Europe for the European market. A multi-purpose vehicle (MPV), Ford also describes the S-Max as an SAV (sports activity vehicle). Introduced at the 2006 Geneva Motor Show, the S-Max went on sale alongside the new generation Ford Galaxy in May 2006.

The S-Max was intended to be as sporty as a saloon car, and spacious as an MPV. It drew inspiration from the seven-seater large MPV Galaxy and the compact MPV Ford C-Max. The S-Max received many positive reviews and awards, and was voted European Car of the Year 2007 on 13 November 2006. Ford had plans to sell the S-Max in Japan under the then subsidiary brand Mazda, but that was no longer viable upon the latter's split.

The S-Max was discontinued in April 2023 alongside the Ford Galaxy without any direct successor.

== Features ==
The S-Max was the first vehicle in Ford's lineup to feature their Kinetic Design styling. The Kinetic Design scheme includes angular headlights, twin trapezoidal grilles, and large wheel arches.

It comes with heated front and back windscreens, parking sensors, auxiliary input and dual climate control as standard. One major selling point of the S-Max is its "Fold Flat System". This design allows the second- and third-row seats to fold seamlessly into the floor, leaving extra storage space. Also, the S-Max's second row has three individual seats, all with ISOFIX attachment points.

== First generation (CD340; 2006) ==
First generation
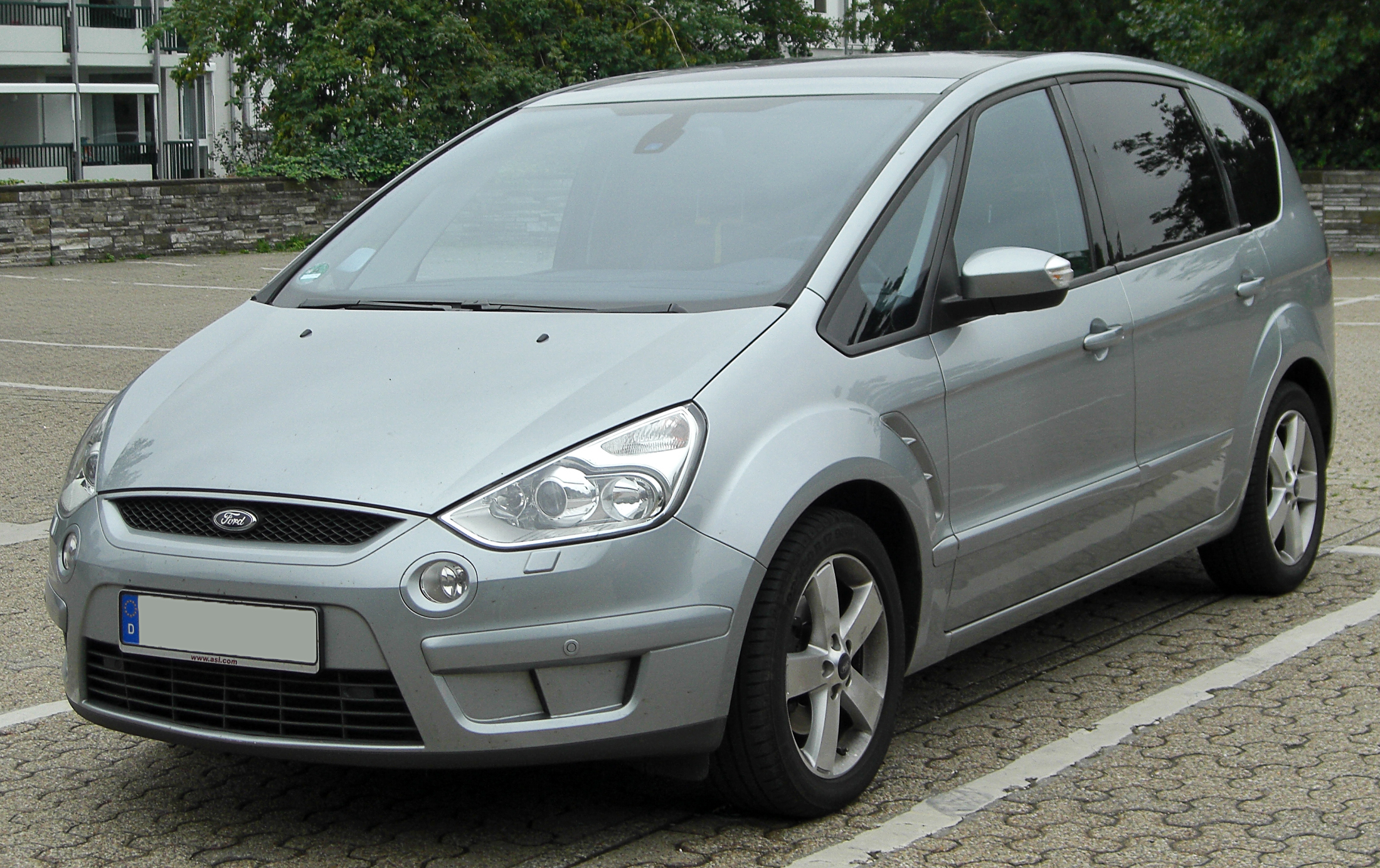
- Ford S-Max (pre-facelift)

Overview
- Model code: CD340
- Production: May 2006 – 2014 (Belgium); 2007–2009 (China); 2012–2014 (Russia)
- Assembly: Belgium: Genk (GB&A); China: Chongqing (Changan Ford); Russia: Yelabuga (Ford Sollers)
- Designer: David Hilton

Body and chassis
- Platform: Ford EUCD platform

Dimensions
- Wheelbase: 2,850 mm (112.2 in)
- Length: 4,770 mm (187.8 in)
- Width: 1,885 mm (74.2 in)
- Height: 1,660 mm (65.4 in)
- Curb weight: 1,743 kg (3,843 lb)

For the English speaking markets there are three derivatives of the S-Max: Edge, Zetec, and the high-end Titanium. Ford has stated that around sixty percent of all S-Max buyers choose Titanium specification. Continental trim levels are Trend, Titanium and the top-of-the-line Titanium S.

In March 2008, a 2.2L 175 PS TDCi common rail diesel was added to Titanium series and delivers acceleration from 0-62 mph in 9.0 seconds. In September 2008, the popular 2.0 140 PS TDCi manual engine was offered with a CO_{2} of 159 g/km. The S-Max Trend debuted in China in 2010. The Trend is basically a normal S-Max, but without the back row of seats. The idea is to make it more affordable, and to give more storage space to people who might want it.

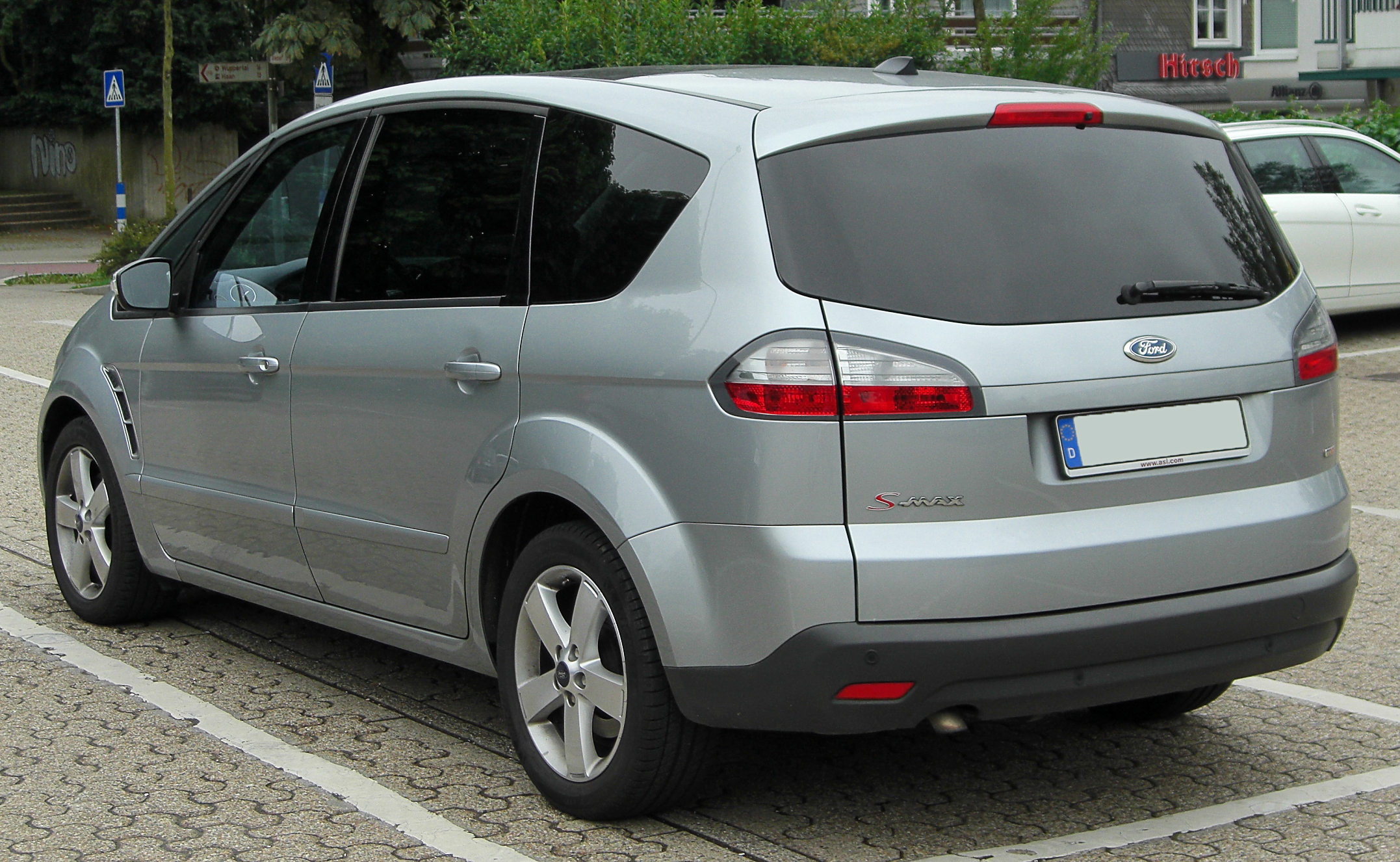
Rear view

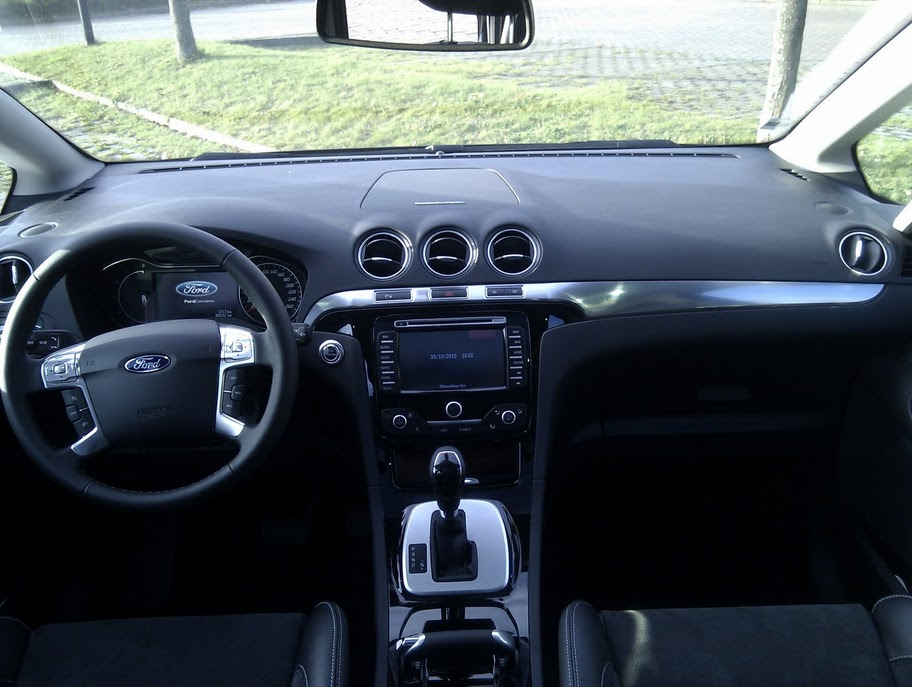
Interior

=== Facelift ===
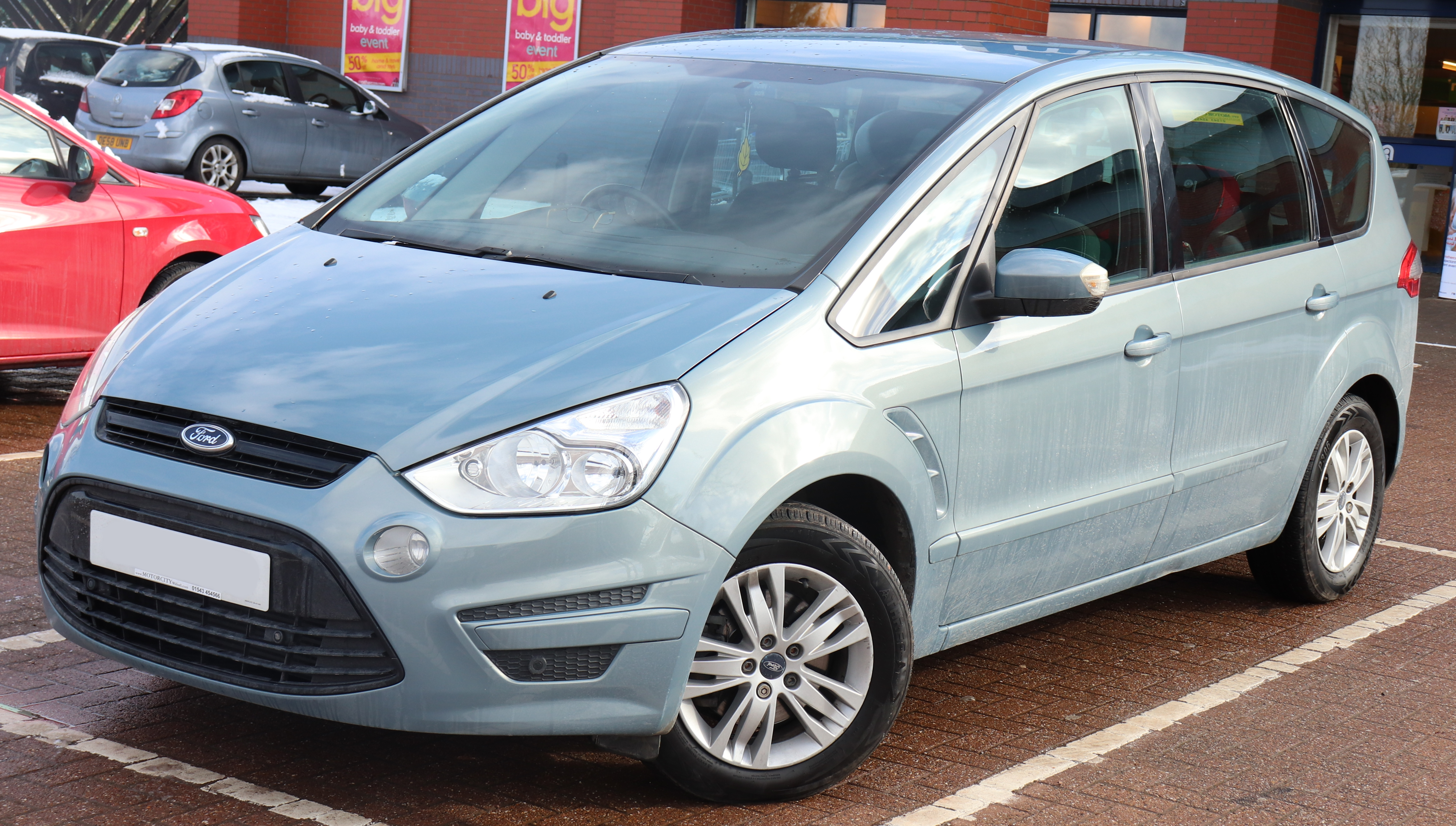
Facelift

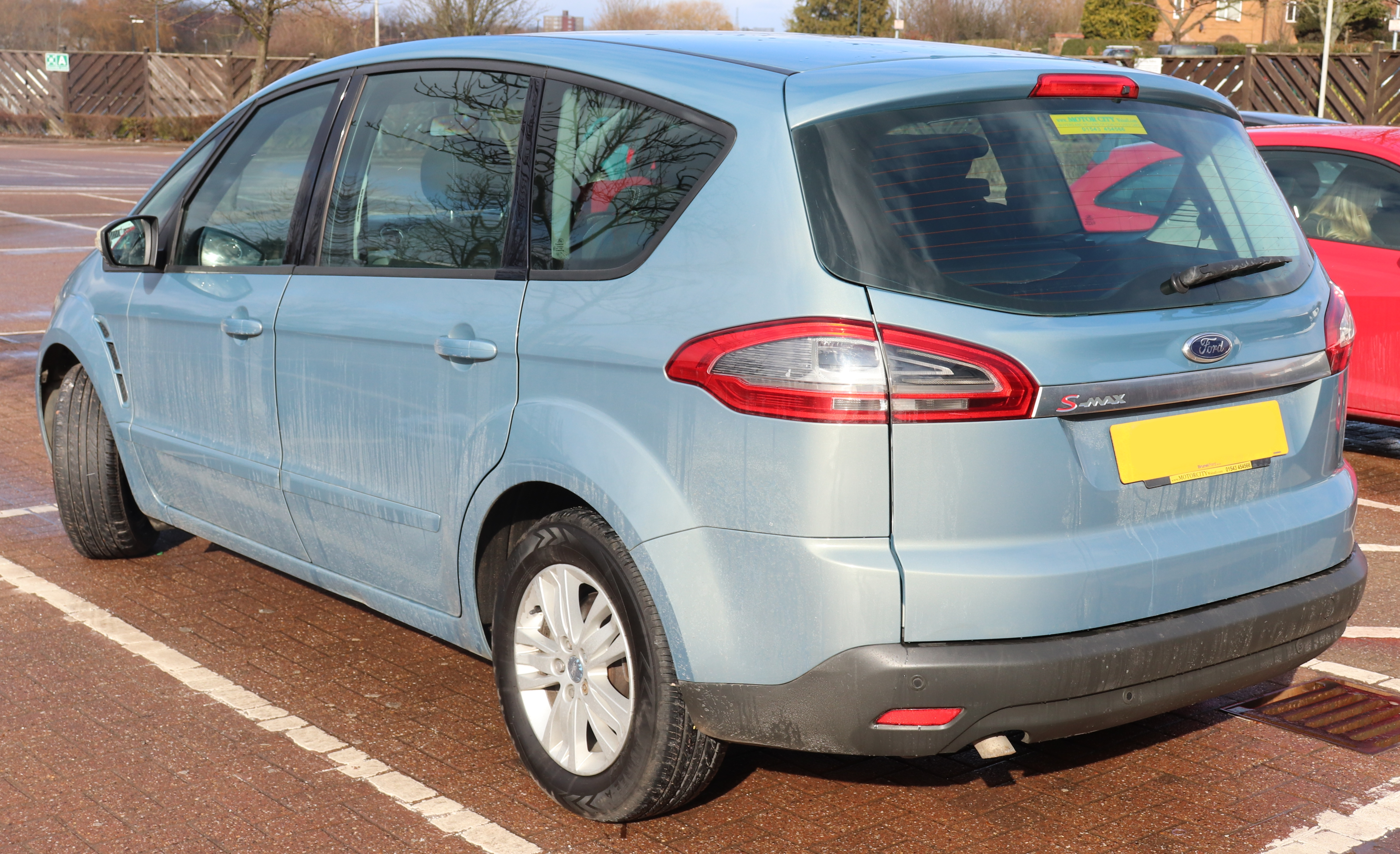
Rear view

=== Powertrain ===
All S-Maxes use versions of the Duratorq or Duratec engines. The S-Max uses a five-speed or six-speed manual transmission, and a six-speed automatic option.

Engine	Power	Transmission
1.8 TDCi	101 PS (101 hp)	5 Speed Manual
1.8 TDCi	125 PS (123 hp)	5 Speed Manual
1.8 TDCi	125 PS (123 hp)	6 Speed Manual
2.0 TDCi	115 PS (113 hp)	6 Speed Manual
2.0 TDCi	140 PS (143 hp)	6 Speed Manual
2.0	145 PS (138 hp)	6 Speed Manual
2.0 145 Flex Fuel	130 PS (128 hp)	5 Speed Manual
2.2 TDCi	175 PS (173 hp)	6 Speed Manual
2.3	160 PS (158 hp)	6 Speed Automatic
2.5 (shared with the Ford Focus ST)	220 PS (217 hp)	6 Speed Manual

- This vehicle has also been converted to use an aftermarket conversion hybrid powertrain: Langford Performance Engineering 'Whisper' powertrain

New petrol engines for the 2010–2011 models:

- 1.6 STCi EcoBoost, 6-speed manual, 160 PS
- 2.0 STCi EcoBoost, Powershift, 203 PS

Powertrains available for the 2012 models:

- 1.6T 160 PS EcoBoost (Start/Stop), 6-speed manual
- 2.0 203 PS EcoBoost, PowerShift auto
- 2.0 240 PS EcoBoost, PowerShift auto
- 1.6 TDCi 115 PS (Start/Stop), 6-speed manual
- 2.0 TDCi 140 PS, 6-speed manual
- 2.0 TDCi 140 PS, PowerShift auto
- 2.0 TDCi 163 PS, 6-speed manual
- 2.0 TDCi 163 PS, PowerShift auto
- 2.2 TDCi 200 PS, 6-speed manual
- 2.2 TDCi 200 PS, Automatic

=== Safety ===
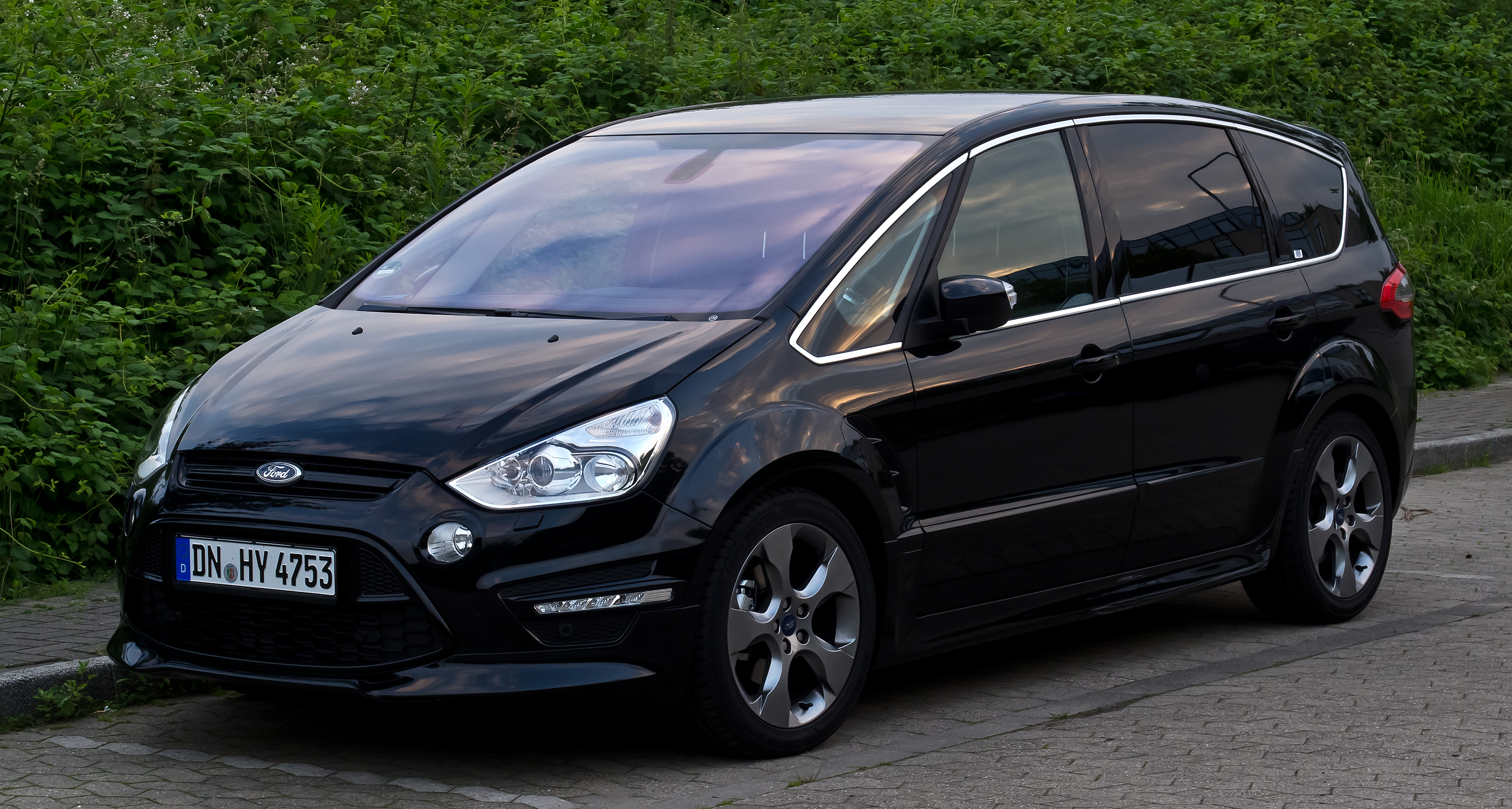
Ford S-Max Titanium S (facelift)

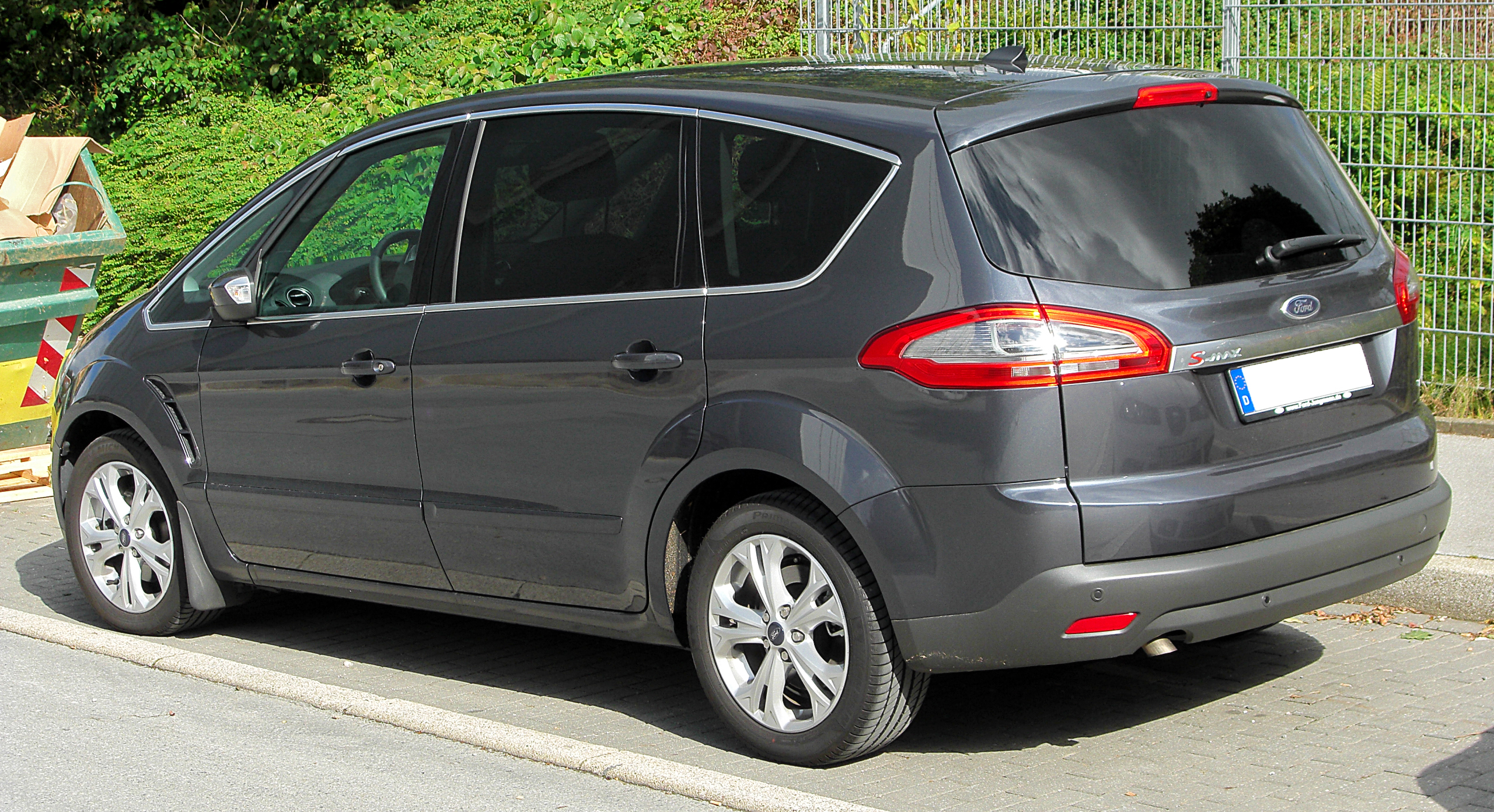
Ford S-Max (facelift)

The Ford S-Max incorporates no breakthrough safety features, but it has received a 5-star/36-point (Best in Class) rating from the Euro NCAP.

The safety features include the Intelligent Protection System (IPS), which combines a body structure optimised for strength and crashworthiness with restraint equipment and driver aids that help avoid an accident and lessen the likelihood of injuries in an impact. It has many modern airbags, including a knee airbag and a thorax airbag.

The S-Max also has an advanced neck protection system, three-point seat belts, optimised pre-tensioners, load limiters, anti-submarining seat subframes, a collapsible steering system, and safety pedals. For handling, it has an Anti-Lock Braking System (ABS) along with Electronic Brakeforce Distribution (EBD) and a standard Electronic Stability Program (ESP) system.

=== Media ===
The high performance version Ford S-Max was reviewed on Top Gear (Series 8, Episode 7) against the similar spec Vauxhall Zafira and the Mercedes B200. The S-Max was the most affordable, yet was described as having the best interior and exterior, and being the most comfortable. The presenters, James May and Richard Hammond, also considered it to be the most practical. Overall, they praised the car and declared it to be the best value for money out of the three.

== Second generation (CD539; 2015) ==
Second generation
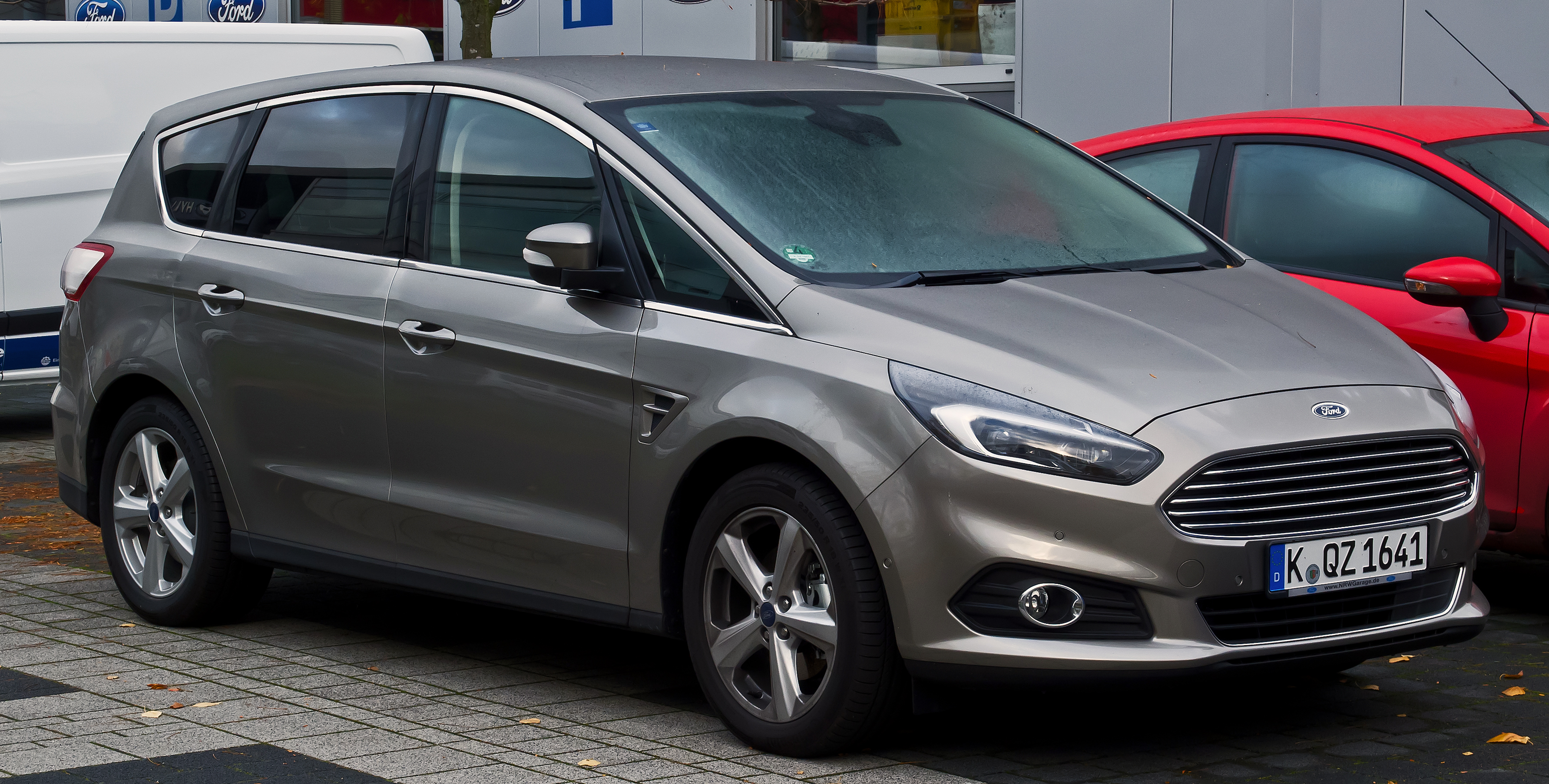

Overview
- Model code: CD539
- Production: 2015 – April 2023
- Assembly: Spain: Almussafes (Ford Valencia Plant)
- Designer: Claudio Messale

Body and chassis
- Platform: Ford CD4 platform
- Related: Ford Galaxy (third generation); Ford Edge (second generation); Lincoln MKZ (second generation); Lincoln Nautilus (first generation); Ford Mondeo (fourth generation)

Powertrain
- Engine: Petrol: 1.5 L EcoBoost I4; 2.0 L EcoBoost I4; Petrol hybrid: 2.5 L Duratec iVCT Atkinson cycle I4; Diesel: 2.0 L Duratorq I4 (2015–2019); 2.0 L EcoBlue I4 turbo (2019–2023); 2.0 L EcoBlue I4 twin-turbo (2019–2023)
- Transmission: 6-speed manual; 6-speed 6F automatic; 8-speed 8F automatic; 6-speed PowerShift dual-clutch transmission; CVT (hybrid)

Dimensions
- Wheelbase: 2,850 mm (112.2 in)
- Length: 4,796–4,804 mm (188.8–189.1 in)
- Width: 1,916 mm (75.4 in)
- Height: 1,655–1,684 mm (65.2–66.3 in)
- Curb weight: 1,645–1,872 kg (3,627–4,127 lb)

The second generation was first presented at the 2014 Paris Motor Show.

After its sibling, Ford Galaxy, was being presented at the 2015 Geneva Motor Show, the S-Max went on production in late 2015. It comes with the same engines as the Galaxy, Mondeo and Edge, which consist of one diesel (in four states of tune) and two petrols. The 1.5 SCTi Ecoboost has 160 hp, and the 2.0 SCTi has 240 hp; the latter can only be had with the Ford 6F automatic transmission. All the diesels average over 50mpg – the best is the 2.0 TDCi Duratorq 120, which produces 57mpg.

Both the 2.0 TDCi 150 and 180 versions come with either a six-speed manual or the Powershift; the latter can also be specced with AWD. The final model, the Bi-Turbo 2.0 TDCi 210 comes with the Powershift Gearbox only, and hits 0 to 62 in under nine seconds. The trim levels are similar to any Ford, and mirror those found in the Galaxy, Mondeo and Edge, including Zetec, Titanium and Titanium Sport; also an executive spec Vignale is available.

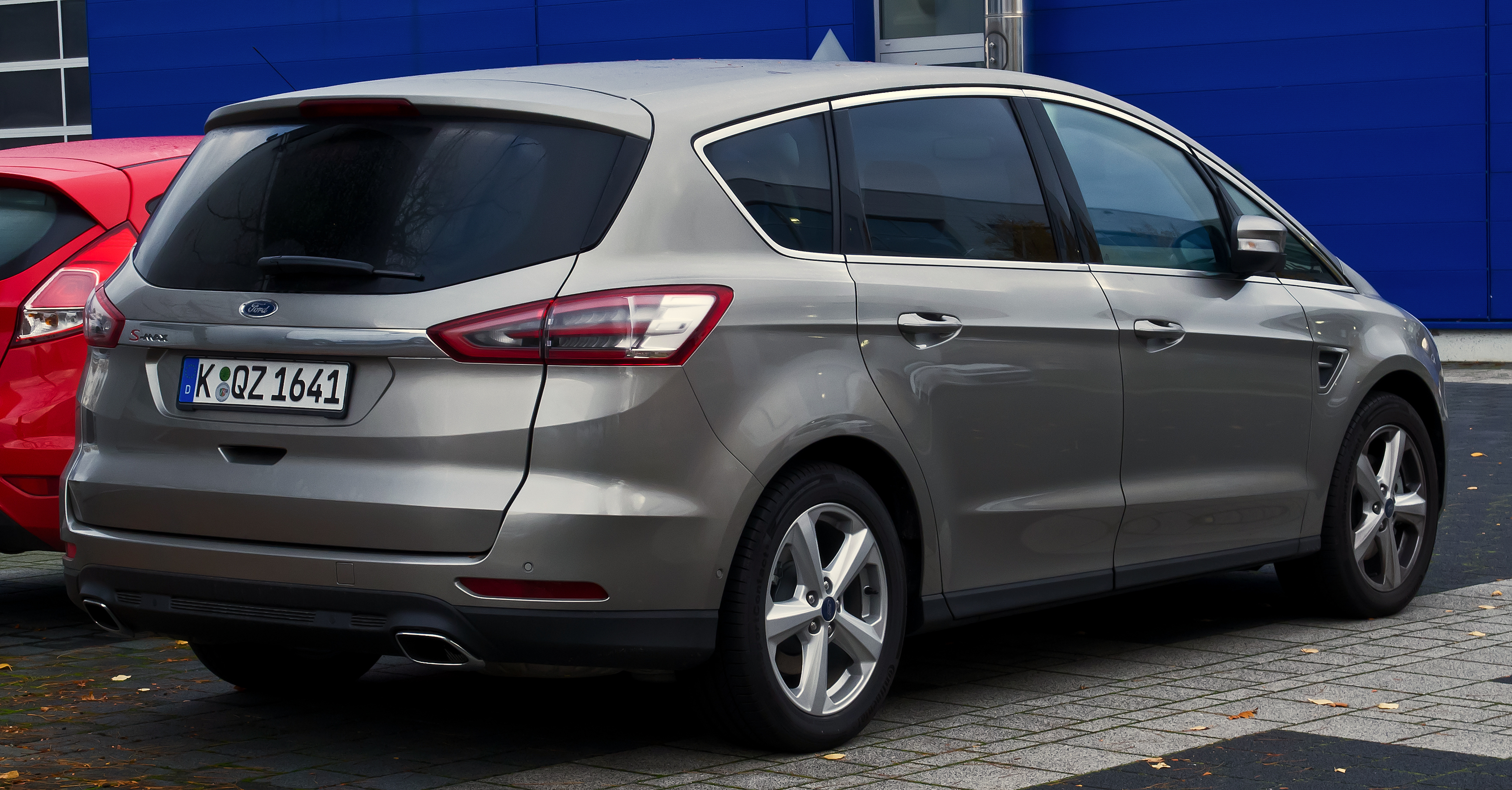
Rear view

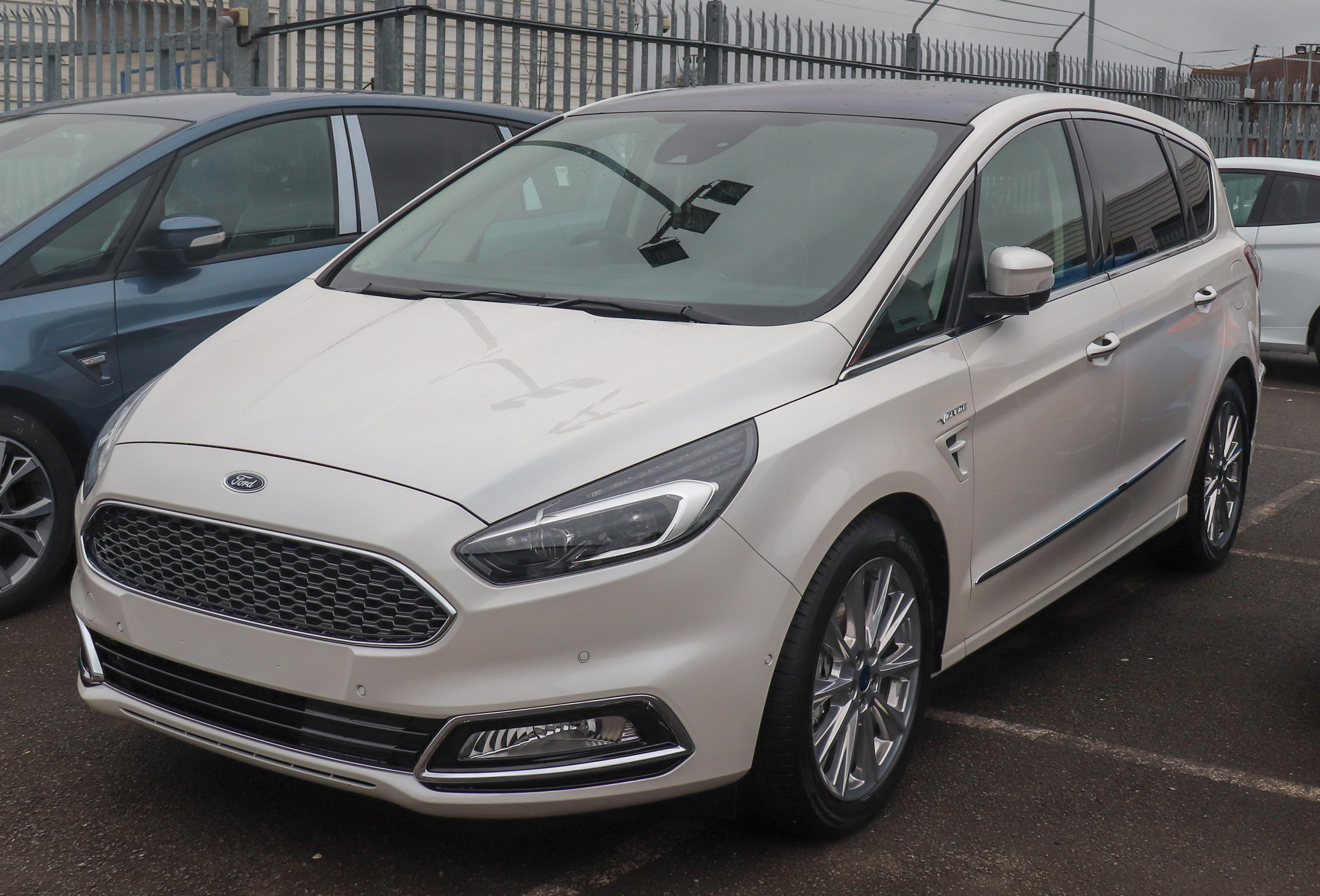
S-Max Vignale

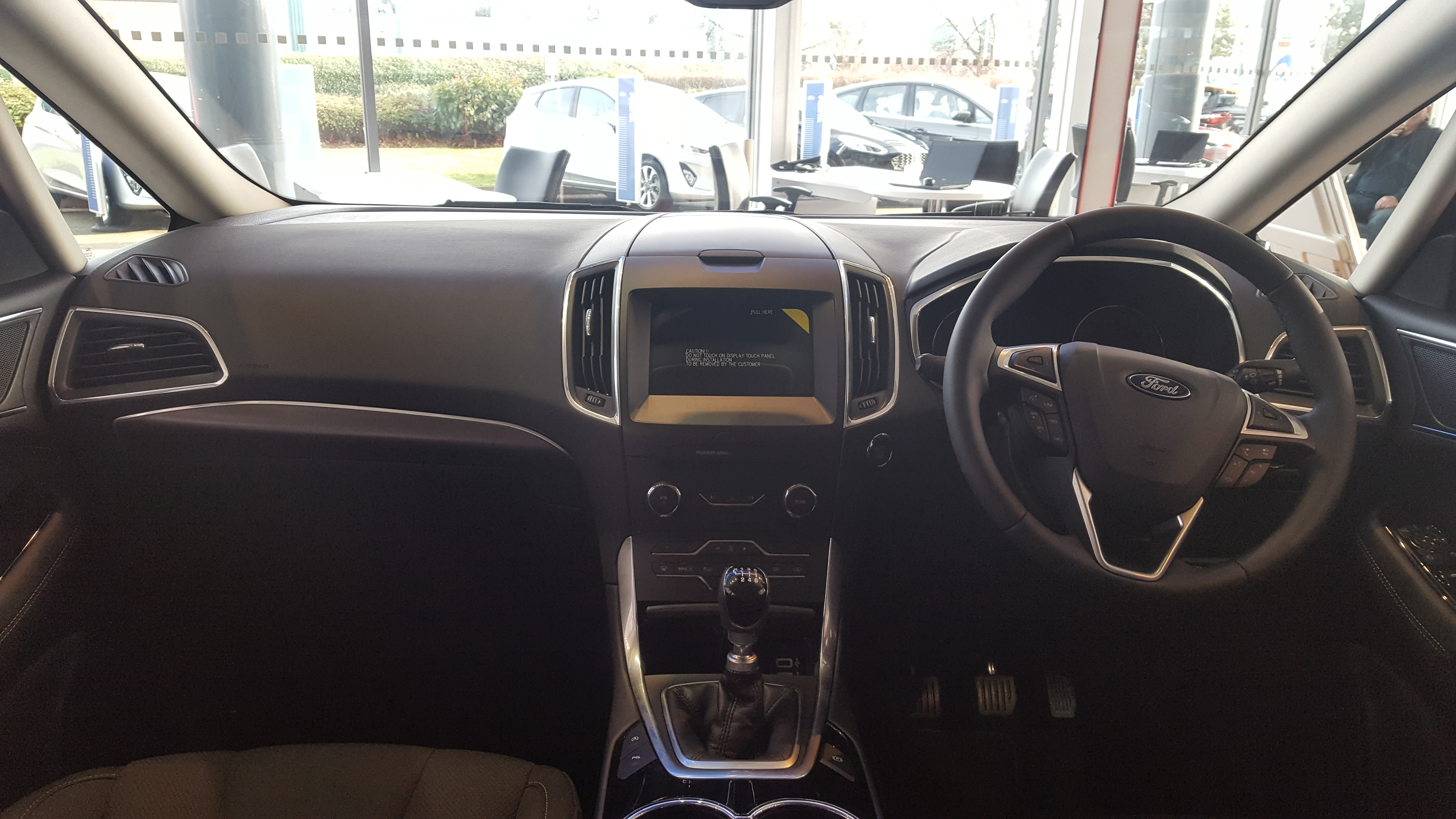
Interior

=== 2019 Facelift ===
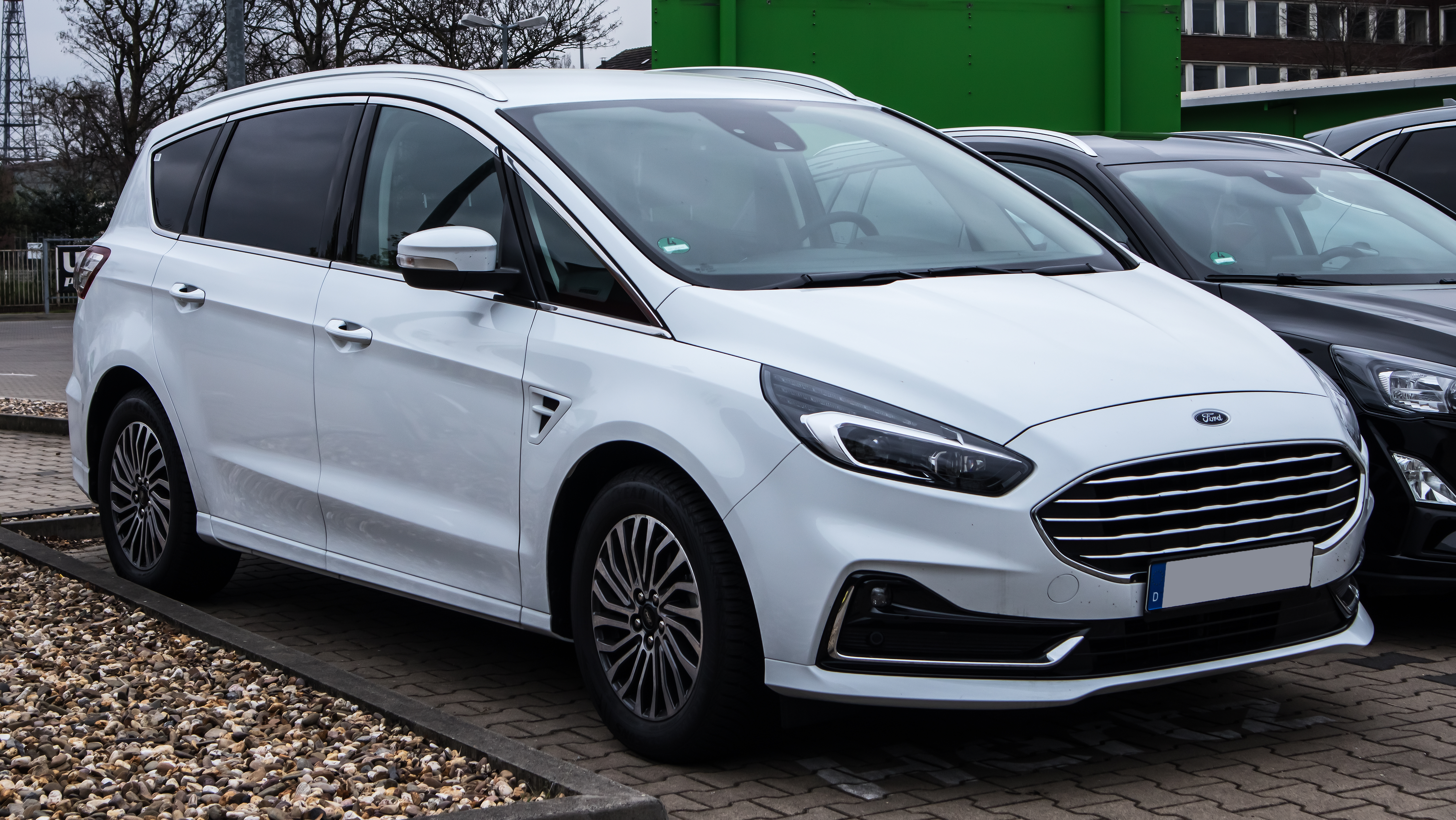
2019 facelift

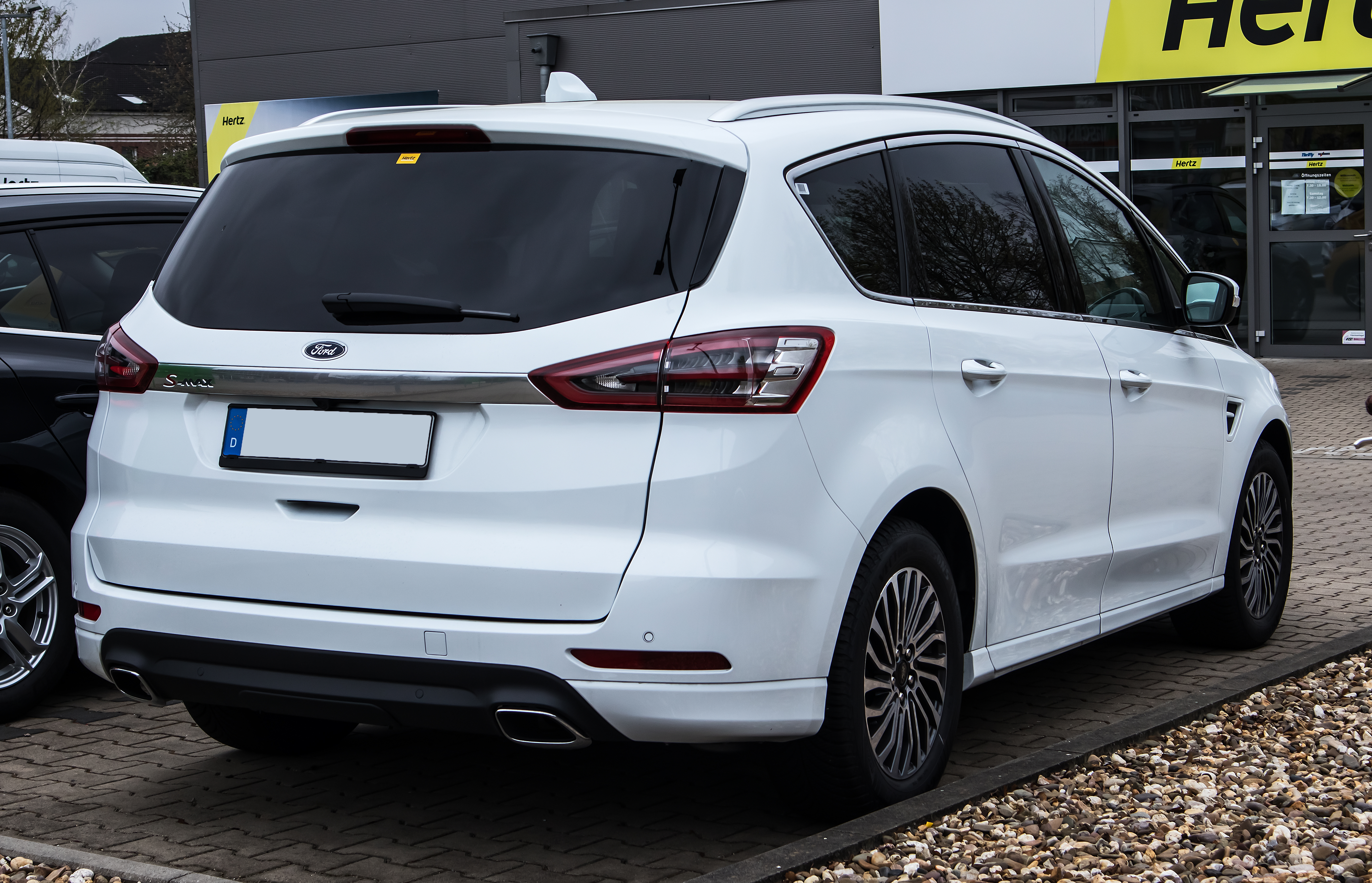
Rear view

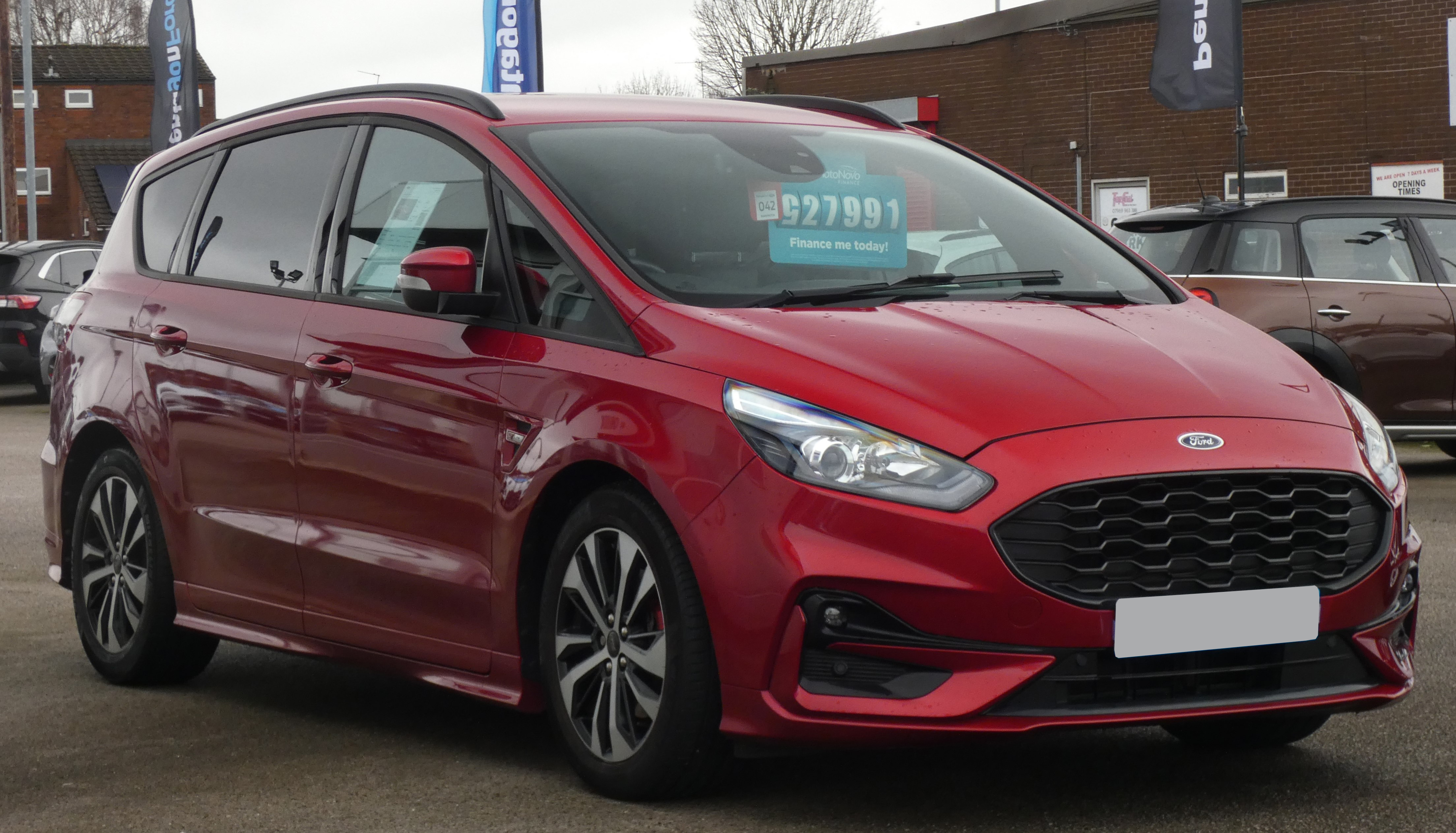
ST-Line

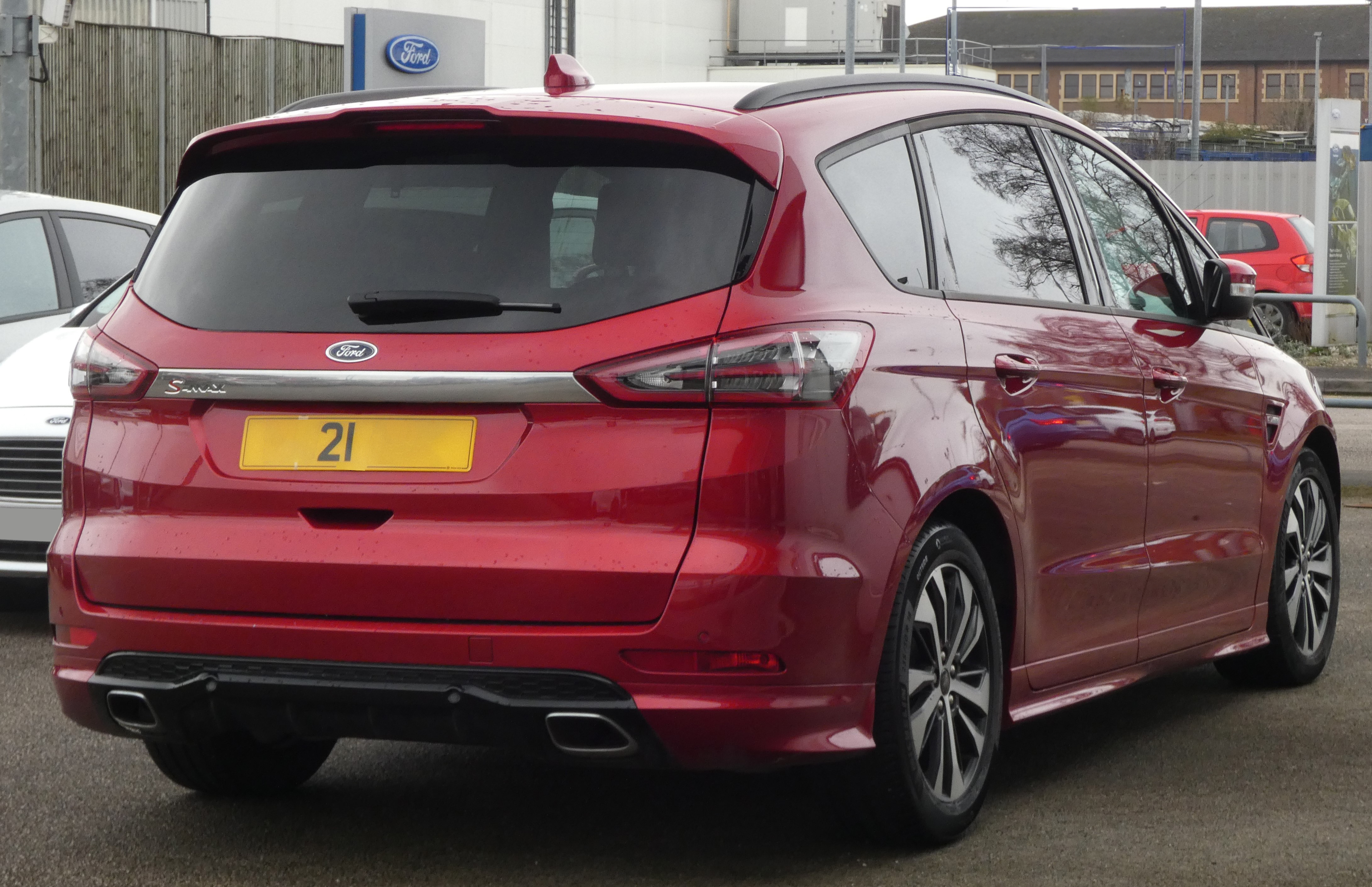
ST-Line; Rear view

In 2019 the facelifted S-Max was revealed. No petrol-engined model was offered, the only engines being various tunings of the 2.0L EcoBlue diesel.

In 2021, all ICE options were dropped and replaced with a 2.5L petrol hybrid system outputting 190 PS (140 kW; 187 bhp).

Production of the S-Max ended in April 2023 due to sharply declining sales in the MPV segment and Ford's shift towards crossovers, SUVs and electrified vehicles.

=== Engine specifications ===
Petrol engines
Model	Year(s)	Displacement	Fuel type	Power	Torque	0–100 km/h (0–62 mph)	CO_{2} Emissions
1.5 EcoBoost 160HP	2015–2018	1,498 cc (91.4 cu in)	Petrol	159 PS (117 kW; 157 bhp)	240 N⋅m (177 ft⋅lb_{f})	9.9 s	149 g/km
2.0 EcoBoost 240HP Auto	2015–2018	1,999 cc (122.0 cu in)	Petrol	241 PS (177 kW; 238 bhp)	345 N⋅m (254 ft⋅lb_{f})	8.4 s	174 g/km
2.5 Duratec Hybrid (HEV)	2021–2023	2,490 cc (151.9 cu in)	Hybrid	190 PS (140 kW; 187 bhp)	200 N⋅m (148 ft⋅lb_{f})	9.8 s	146-150 g/km

Diesel engines
Model	Year(s)	Displacement	Fuel type	Power	Torque	0–100 km/h (0–62 mph)	CO_{2} Emissions
2.0 TDCi 120HP	2015–2023	1,997 cc (121.9 cu in)	Diesel	120 PS (88 kW; 118 bhp)	310 N⋅m (229 ft⋅lb_{f})	13.4 s	129 g/km
2.0 TDCi 150HP	2015–2023	1,997 cc (121.9 cu in)	Diesel	150 PS (110 kW; 148 bhp)	350 N⋅m (258 ft⋅lb_{f})	10.8 s	129 g/km
2.0 EcoBlue TDCi 150HP PowerShift	2015– 2019–2020	1,997 cc (121.9 cu in)	Diesel	150 PS (110 kW; 148 bhp)	350 N⋅m (258 ft⋅lb_{f})	10.8 s	139 g/km
2.0 EcoBlue TDCi 150HP AWD	2015– 2019–2020	1,997 cc (121.9 cu in)	Diesel	150 PS (110 kW; 148 bhp)	350 N⋅m (258 ft⋅lb_{f})	12.1 s	139 g/km
2.0 EcoBlue TDCi 180HP	2015–2019; 2019–2020	1,997 cc (121.9 cu in)	Diesel	179 PS (132 kW; 177 bhp)	400 N⋅m (295 ft⋅lb_{f})	9.7 s	129 g/km
2.0 EcoBlue TDCi 180HP PowerShift	2015–2019; 2019–2020	1,997 cc (121.9 cu in)	Diesel	179 PS (132 kW; 177 bhp)	400 N⋅m (295 ft⋅lb_{f})	9.5 s	139 g/km
2.0 EcoBlue TDCi 180HP AWD PowerShift	2015–2019; 2019–2020	1,997 cc (121.9 cu in)	Diesel	179 PS (132 kW; 177 bhp)	400 N⋅m (295 ft⋅lb_{f})	10.5 s	149 g/km
2.0 EcoBlue TDCi Bi-turbo 210HP PowerShift	2019–2020	1,997 cc (121.9 cu in)	Diesel	209 PS (154 kW; 206 bhp)	450 N⋅m (332 ft⋅lb_{f})	8.8 s	144 g/km
