= Zakham =

Zakham may refer to:

- Zakham (1989 film), an Indian Hindi-language romantic-drama film by Irfan Khan, starting Chunky Pandey and Neelam Kothari
- Zakham (1994 film), a Maldivian film
- Zakham (TV series), a 2017 Pakistani drama series

== See also ==
- Zakhmi Dil (disambiguation)
- Zakhm, 1998 Indian drama film by Mahesh Bhatt, starring Ajay Devgn and Pooja Bhatt
- Zakhmi (2012 film) former title of Talaash: The Answer Lies Within, 2012 Indian psychological crime thriller film by Reema Katgi, starring Aamir Khan and Kareena Kapoor
- Zakhmee, a 1975 Indian Hindi-language film by Raja Thakur, starring Sunil Dutt and Asha Parekh
