= Dave Hilton =

Dave Hilton may refer to:

- Dave Hilton (baseball) (1950–2017), American former baseball player
- Dave Hilton (rugby union) (born 1970), British former rugby union player
- Dave Hilton Jr. (born 1963), Canadian former boxer
- Dave Hilton Sr. (born 1940), Canadian former boxing trainer
- David Hilton (auto designer), European auto designer
- David Hilton (footballer) (born 1977), English footballer
