= David Hilton (auto designer) =

American automobile designer

David Hilton is an American/German automotive designer working internationally.

Hilton was born and raised in Detroit, Michigan. From 1991 until 2000, he was a designer and chief designer for Ford Motor Company in Detroit, England, Brazil, Japan and Germany. His most notable automotive contributions include the fastest electric vehicle in the world, the NIO EP9, the most aerodynamic concept to date, the GAC ENO.146 which won the coveted IF DESIGN AWARD, the BENTLEY Bentayga SUV, the Ford Focus RS, the Ford S-MAX (2007 Car of the Year), and the Ford F-150. From 2000 through 2011 he ran the successful European based design firm Motorcity Europe, where he oversaw and created the designs of the SPECTRE and MC1 super cars, as well as working on the Infiniti Emerg-e concept car. In 2012 he was appointed Head of Exterior Design for Bentley Motors in England, being responsible for the Bentley GT3, and the Bentley SUV Production Bentayga vehicle. In May 2015 he was hired as the Senior Design Director at Nio (previously NEXTEV), where he worked on this all new brand and was Design Director of the NIO EP9 supercar. During 2018-2020, David Hilton was hired as the Advanced Design Director Shanghai & Design Strategy Director at GAC R&D. based in Shanghai. Since January 2021, Mr. Hilton works as the Senior Director Global Design and Brand at the luxury EV maker Karma Automotive in southern California. Hilton is also known for his automotive and figurative artwork, plus lecturing activities.

In addition to his excellence in the automotive field, he also is a master of martial arts since childhood.

== Career ==
=== Ford ===
Starting his career in 1991 at Ford Design in Detroit within the International Advanced Design Studio, under the leadership of Jack Telnack, Hilton was sent to various design studios around the world. These included assignments at Ford of Brazil, Ford/Mazda in Japan, Ford of Germany, Ford of Britain, and the Ford Truck design studios, where he worked on such projects as the Focus ST, Ford F-150, Ford Ranger, VW Gol, Ford Mondeo, CMAX among others. As the chief designer on the 2002 Focus RS project, based in the UK, Hilton worked under the then President Ford of Europe Dr. Martin Leach. The RS was launched at the 2000 Geneva auto show with great acclaim. Hilton continued to work at Ford of Germany as a consultant from 2000-2006, working on such pivotal projects as the 2007 European car of the year Ford SMAX.

=== Consulting Years ===
From 2000 until 2012, David Hilton guided the successful European design consultancy MotorCityEurope. Clients included Hyundai, KIA, TATA, Jaguar, Land Rover, Mazda, Nissan, McLaren, Citroen, VW, Ford, according to the website.

The company offered both automotive and product design solutions with projects such as the Infiniti Emerg-e concept car, the SPECTRE supercar, the Mazda Superlite, UIUX designs, sporting goods, and even a baby stroller.

=== Bentley Motors ===
In early 2012, Hilton joined Bentley Motors as 'Head of Exterior Design' in England. Production development programs included the Bentley GT3 (see launch interview), the Bentley Bentayga, and the Mulsanne Convertible.

=== NIO ===
In 2015, Hilton became one of the first few employees of the now very successful China based Electric Vehicle startup Nio, which at the time was called NEXTEV. He began working once again under the then new co-President of NIO, Dr. Martin Leach. In 2015, the design team leaders consisted of Kris Tomasson, Juho Suh, David Hilton, and was based in Munich and London. During these early days, the design team created and developed the NIO brand identity, logo, story and product plans. The first product to be launched in November 2016 was the world record breaking Nio EP9. See making of film here. Both the NIO brand and the EP9 vehicle were launched together on November 21, 2016 at the Saatchi Gallery in London. Following the successful launch of the NIO brand, the Nio ES8 was launched in April 2017 at the Shanghai Auto Show. Other key concepts and vehicles such as the NIO EVE and Nio ES6 soon followed. Hilton remained as the Senior Design Director of NIO before later moving to GAC in Shanghai, China.
