= Matthew Hilton =

Matthew Hilton may refer to:

- Matthew Hilton (historian), British social historian
- Matthew Hilton (designer) (born 1957), British furniture designer
- Matthew Hilton (boxer) (born 1965), Canadian light-middleweight boxer
