= Joe Hilton =

Joseph Hilton or Joe Hilton is the name of:

- Joe Hilton (footballer, born 1931), English footballer
- Joe Hilton (footballer, born 1999), English footballer
- Joseph Hilton Smyth, American publisher and author
