= Paul Hilton =

Paul Hilton may refer to:

- Paul Hilton (actor) (born 1970), British actor
- Paul Hilton (footballer) (born 1959), English footballer
- Paul Hilton (politician) (1899–1965), member of the Legislative Assembly of Queensland
