= Scott Hilton =

Scott Hilton may refer to:

- Scott Hilton (American football) (born 1954), American football linebacker
- Scott Hilton (politician), one-term former member of the Georgia House of Representatives
