= Martin Leach (executive) =

Martin Leach (1957 – 1 November 2016) was a British businessman and engineer and the President of NEXTEV, a startup technology company specialised in designing and developing high-performance electric vehicles.

Leach had an automotive career spanning more than 40 years. He has led car and truck organisations and OEMs in Europe, US and China. He was a qualified and certified engineer and was involved in more than 250 product programs.

During his career Leach was involved in operations and financial management, product creation and development, start ups, mergers and acquisitions and turnarounds as well as all parts of the Automotive Industry Value Chain/ His career focus beyond product and business leadership was process quality management.

A fellow of the Institute of Mechanical Engineers, educated at Duke University and INSEAD he was awarded a Doctor of Science from the University of Hertfordshire in 2000. Starting as a karting racer when he was 11 years old and turning professional at age 14, Leach had a successful career as a professional racer in karts and cars achieving numerous champion titles in Europe and participating in Formula One test races.

== Biography ==
Leach was a Ford employee from 1979 to 2003. In 1992, he was appointed Director of Truck Sales and Marketing, Ford Europe. Two years later, in 1994 he was appointed Director Worldwide Light Trucks, Ford Global. During this period he took the European commercial vehicle division to the top of the sales tables and doubled the U.S. light-truck business.

Between 1996 and 1999 he was Director of Global R&D, Managing Director and Member of the Board of Mazda. He developed a new product philosophy and brand strategy that resulted in cars such as the Mazda 6 and the rotary-engined RX-8.

In 1999 he was appointed Corporate Officer of Ford. In 2000 he became Vice President of product Development at Ford Europe. In 2002 he became the President of Ford Europe. During this period, he began implementing the so-called ’45 in 5’ strategy, a plan to launch forty-five fresh products between 2002 and 2007. The strategy resulted in the launch of the Ford Fusion, the Ford Streetka, and the Ford C-Max.

In 2003 Leach and Ford had a falling-out which resulted in Ford announcing that Leach had resigned. Leach sued Ford and won an injunction preventing Ford from enforcing a non-compete agreement against him. In 2005, Leach settled his lawsuit with Ford for US$2.1 million.

In 2004, Leach became Chief Executive Officer of Maserati, Gruppo Ferrari. Maserati dismissed Leach in February 2005 as part of parent company Fiat's plan to align the brand with Alfa Romeo.

In 2005, Leach partnered with Shanghai Automotive Industries Corporation (SAIC) with the intent of purchasing the assets of the MG Rover Group following its bankruptcy, with the proposal including plans for a new Morris Minor. The bid was lost to the Nanjing Automobile Corporation.

In July 2006 it was announced that Leach had been appointed chairman of LDV Group in England, by the new owner, the Russian automotive company GAZ Group. In 2008, Leach was appointed Vice Chairman of Ferronordic Group Volvo Construction Equipment.

In 2014 he became Board Advisor of Nokia Here and Chairman of Forward Composites.

Martin Leach ran Magma International, the firm that entered into an agreement to buy the Super Aguri F1 team, but backed out after Magma’s financial backers, Dubai Investment Capital walked out of the agreement in the last minute.

In 2015 he became the Co-President of NEXTEV, a startup technology company specialised in designing and developing high-performance electric vehicles. Supported by NEXTEV, the NEXTEV TCR Formula E Team, (formerly known as China Racing Formula E) won the first annual racing driver champion in Formula E's history, becoming the first Chinese racing team to win a globally recognised, world-class auto racing championship.

== Awards ==
In 2000 Leach received an honorary doctorate at the University of Hertfordshire.

He was Product Development Executive of the Year for Automotive News in 2002.

In 2004 he was named Man of the Year by Automobile.

== Sporting achievements ==
Starting as a karting racer when he was 11 years. Leach turned professional when he was 14. Leach had a successful career as a professional racer in karts and cars, achieving several champion titles in Europe.

In 1974 he was the Winner of the Europa Cup and was 3rd in the World Karting Championships Rye House.

In 1979 he was Champion of Champions and Sportsman of the year at the Hong Kong Kart Grand Prix.

In 2000 he was Podium at the Vallelunga 6 Hours.

In 2001 he was Class Winner at the Nurburgring 24 Hours.
