= Peter Hilton (British Army officer) =

British Army officer (1919–1995)

Colonel Sir Peter Hilton KCVO MC & Two Bars KStJ JP DL
- Born: 30 June 1919; Winchester, Hampshire, England
- Died: 30 May 1995 (aged 75)
- Burial place: Idridgehay, Derbyshire, England
- Alma mater: Royal Military Academy, Woolwich
- Spouse: Lady Winifred Smith (m. 1942)
- Children: Andrew Hilton; Richard Hilton
- Relatives: Major-General Richard Hilton (father)
- Military career
- Allegiance: United Kingdom
- Branch: British Army
- Service years: 1939
- Rank: Colonel
- Nickname: "Hawk-eyed"
- Service number: 85503
- Unit: Royal Artillery
- Commands: 528 Light, Anti-Aircraft Regiment, Royal Artillery (1953)
- Conflicts: Second World War: Battle of France; Battle of Dunkirk; Dunkirk evacuation; North African Campaign; First Battle of El Alamein; Second Battle of El Alamein; Italian campaign; Sicilian Campaign; Allied invasion of Italy; Operation Overlord
- Awards: Knight Commander of the Royal Victorian Order; Military Cross & Two Bars; Mentioned in Dispatches
- Other work: Lord Lieutenant of Derbyshire (1978–94)

Colonel Sir Peter Hilton, KCVO, MC & Two Bars, KStJ, JP, DL (30 June 1919 – 30 May 1995) was a senior officer in the British Army and a businessman.

== Early life ==
Hilton was the son of Major General Richard Hilton and his wife Phyllis Woodin, and was educated at Malvern College. He was born into a County Durham family whose country home was Hylton Castle, near Sunderland.

== Military career ==
He attended the Royal Military Academy, Woolwich shortly before the Second World War and received his commission as a second lieutenant in the Royal Artillery on 26 January 1939.

In the Second World War, he initially served with 19th Field Regiment at Bordon, Hampshire. Thereafter he was posted to France, attached to the British Expeditionary Force (BEF). He noted that "nothing exciting happened" in these initial stages of the war.

=== Second World War ===
==== Battle of France ====
This feeling would quickly shift when the Germans began their invasion through the Low Countries on 10 May 1940. Hilton and the 19th Field Regiment headed through Brussels to take up a position on the River Orne. However, he found that once there, formations on either side were already falling back and that Belgium had surrendered on 28 May 1940. This subsequently forced the 19th Field Regiment to fall back.

===== Battle of Dunkirk =====
The unit eventually found themselves at Dunkirk "guns intact" where they acted as part of the rear guard. Hilton noted that the German Army "did not press us as hard as they might have done." Their main problem was aerial bombing by the Luftwaffe.

===== Evacuation of Dunkirk =====
One night Hilton and the 19th Field Regiment were told to evacuate. With a group of his men they were taken off by a British fishing boat, the crew of this particular vessel managed to "rescue several cases of whiskey"; This in turn led to the crew passing out on the way across the English Channel, Hilton put this down to a mixture of the whiskey and likely tiredness of the crew. Nearing England, he was asked to pilot the boat into Ramsgate, Kent, England. After having successfully piloting the boat into the harbour, the survivors of the Battle of Dunkirk were surprised that they were being treated as heroes rather than "people who had been chased out of France," Hilton recalled.

After having arrived at Matlock, it was here that Hilton and a select few of his men that remained, were housed by various members of the Matlock Rotary Club. The next day he went into Matlock to send a wire to his mother to inform her of his safe arrival back to England and to check whether his father Richard Hilton had got away safely - a later reply confirmed that he too managed to get away safely. His host from the Matlock Rotary Club asked Hilton to run a message to his daughter whom was running the Women's Voluntary Service (WVS) canteen or Dunkirk survivors at the Railway Hotel, Crown Square, Matlock. On his way there he met his wife-to-be Lady Winifred Smith.

==== North African Campaign ====
In January 1942 Hilton was posted to the Middle East. Having joined the 7th Armoured Division, 3rd Regiment Royal Horse Artillery, they went to help obstruct the German thrust towards Cairo. His birthday on 30 June 1942 followed with the Battle of Ruweisat which due to the hectic nature of the battle nearly shook him out of the Armoured Division. He noted "If it's like this in an armoured division I shan't last very long."

On the evening of 10 July 1942, during the First Battle of El Alamein, Hilton who was attached to "M" Battery of the 3rd Regiment Royal Horse Artillery received his first Military Cross at an engagement on Ruweisat Ridge. While on his way back from an observation post at Point 63 alongside Major G. Masters of "D" Battery, RHA, and three carriers of the Scots Guards, their group came under heavy enemy fire. Major Masters' armoured car was struck by a 50mm shell from an anti-tank gun at 300 yards, killing the driver (Howewood) and the observation post assistant (Gnr. Davidson), while two carriers were hit, one catching fire. Hilton drove his vehicle 200 yards to reach the damaged armoured car, halting beside it under heavy anti-tank and machine gun fire, to evacuate the surviving crew members while engaging the enemy anti-tank gun with a Boyes rifle. After rescuing a Guardsman he moved his armoured car to cover. From this position, he provided covering fire with high-explosives and deployed a smoke screen eventually neutralizing the area, allowing for the remaining carrier crews to withdraw unscathed. For this action he was awarded the Military Cross.

After stopping the German advance, they built up their strength for the Second Battle of El Alamein. Their objective was to break through and then pursue the enemy.

It was on 11 November 1942 that Hilton received the bar to his Military Cross. Hilton advanced from the top of Halfaya Pass in North Africa, moving under the cover of early morning light alongside leading infantry units. The infantry halted and established positions approximately 7 miles west along the pass, while Hilton himself proceeded an additional 2 miles alone to conduct reconnaissance, taking position in a gap within a minefield. Shortly thereafter, a column of 23 German vehicles approached rapidly from the south, heading towards the gap where he was positioned. Hilton, supported by infantry fire, engaged the enemy column. Firing his 37mm from his tank, he contributed to the destruction of three enemy vehicles, while four others detonated on mines as they navigated through the minefield. When a German vehicle attempted to slip past him he fired at it with his rifle managing to take out one of the vehicle's occupants, though the vehicle did manage to escape. The remaining German force composed of approximately one hundred personnel surrendered to Captain Hilton, alongside their equipment. It was also at this battle during which he would be wounded in the arm and hand and was subsequently hospitalized in Cairo.

After a series of battles Hilton and his unit eventually made it to Tunisia and witnessed the surrender of Germans and Italians.

==== Italian Campaign ====
Hilton and his unit, the 3rd Regiment Royal Horse Artillery, as part of the American Fifth Army, (under Lieutenant-General Mark W. Clark) participated in Operation Avalanche with the landings at Salerno. The unit was with the Americans during the thrust up the west-coast past the Garigliano and Volturno River lines which the Germans were trying to defend. Hilton described the war at this stage as being "more unpleasant, a war of slow movement and gains, a war of attrition".

It was around Christmas 1943 when the unit was pulled out and brought back to the United Kingdom to re-equip and prepare for the invasion of Europe. What followed was six months of specialist training alongside being supplied with better equipment, guns and tanks.

==== Operation Overlord ====
During the Normandy campaign in 1944, Hilton, serving with the Royal Horse Artillery, took charge of a raft bringing tanks to the invasion beaches. Facing intense enemy gunfire and a malfunctioning engine, he managed to signal a landing craft over to him to provide a tow, remarkably, the landing craft was commanded by his brother.

On 5 August 1944, Hilton would go on to receive the second bar to his Military Cross. Around 'La Valee' near Mont d'Ancre he established an observation post at a hedge junction on high ground just northeast of a village, overlooking the reverse slopes of Point 172, as the 1/7 Battalion, Queen's Royal Regiment, captured nearby high ground. Accompanying him was a Captain Stokes; they were not supported by infantry cover due to limited resources, the pair had "incredibly accurate shooting". Under intense enemy mortar and shell fire, Hilton's observation post positioned within 50 yards of an enemy position, scored direct hits on German slit trenches alongside an enemy observation post. The 3rd Regiment Royal Horse Artillery (particularly J Battery) reduced the strength of No. 3 Company, 990th Grenadier Regiment (German) from 100 to 50 men according to a Prisoner of War statement taken at the time.

The next day on 6 August 1944, Hilton again occupied an exposed observation post beyond the forward defense lines without infantry support, enduring heavy enemy fire and patrol activity to relay invaluable intelligence. The citation for the second bar to his Military Cross concluded with "His courage and determination in dominating a very energetic enemy with his guns, undoubtedly saved the infantry many casualties, and helped them to obtain and hold their objective."

It was during this same campaign on 14 August 1944 that Hilton would be severely injured at the Battle of the Falaise Gap. As commander of J Battery Royal Horse Artillery, Hilton had lost contact with his observation officer. He set out with a battery captain to establish an observation post. While driving his Jeep when he noticed a friendly lorry coming towards him, forgetting about the possibility of their being land mines, he pulled up on a grass verge, immediately following this a mine detonated under his vehicle. He was found unconscious with the vehicle partially on top of him. He suffered critical head injuries and lost his left eye, earning the nickname "hawk-eyed" Hilton. His wife initially received a telegram notifying her that Hilton was missing and believed to be killed; this was rectified to state that he had been severely wounded and was not expected to live. He was treated in a Birmingham hospital by plastic surgeon Sir Harold Gillies who had previously operated on his father (Major General Richard Hilton) in the First World War. Peter Hilton recovered within a year, resuming military service thereafter. He received three decorations for gallantry in combat.

=== Post-war military career ===
In 1946, during the Greek Civil War, Hilton was attached to the British Military Mission to Greece, where he was posted to Athens as an artillery instructor. While in Greece, Hilton also taught at the Royal Hellenic Staff College. He lived in a summer villa at Ekali, 13 miles north of Athens. He was mentioned in dispatches by Lieutenant-General Yatzis, chief of the Greek General Staff in 1949.

He retired from active service 11 May 1949 receiving a gratuity. He was also granted the honorary rank of major. Despite him ceasing to be a member of the regular army he continued to serve in the Territorial Army Reserve of Officers.

On 1 October 1962, Hilton (then a lieutenant colonel) requested to revert down to the rank of lieutenant whilst he was serving with the Army Cadet Force he ceased to serve with the ACF 1 October 1966 being restored to his former rank of lieutenant-colonel.

== Later life ==
After retiring from the Army, Hilton took over running nurseries at Tansley, Derbyshire, from his wife's family. In March 1959, he bought Alton Manor, Idridgehay, in the same county, which was then occupied by a life tenant, Brigadier General E. C. W. D. Walthall, but on his death in 1962, Hilton moved into the house with his wife and two sons.

In 1972, Hilton was made an honorary colonel. From 1978 to 1994, he was Lord Lieutenant of Derbyshire, and was created a Knight of the Order of St John on 18 December 1980.

=== Britannia Park ===
In the early 1980s, Hilton invested in Britannia Park, a theme park developed on the site of Shipley Hall, Derbyshire within Shipley Country Park. The park, which opened on 27 June 1985, aimed to celebrate British culture and history through attractions, a water sports arena and an exhibition hall. It was also intended to create jobs in an area with high unemployment.

==== Development ====
Plans for Britannia Park began in 1979 discussions began with Derbyshire County Council, who owned the site and an organization referred to as "KLF" led by Peter Kellard. After a change in county council leadership and a legal dispute between KLF and the council, the project was restructured as Britannia Park, with Kellard as a key figure and John Wright as chairman of Britannia Park Ltd.

==== Closure and Aftermath ====
Britannia Park closed down ten weeks after its opening (27 June 1985). The collapse triggered a three-year police fraud investigation culminating in a fourteen-month trial (the longest in British history at the time) at Nottingham Crown Court. This trial led to Kellard being sentenced to four years imprisonment (only serving one year due to health reasons). The chairman of Britannia Park Ltd., John Wright received a sentence of six months in prison. The park was redeveloped as the American Adventure Theme Park.

==== Impact on Hilton ====
Hilton's investment in Britannia Park resulted in debts of £28,000, forcing him to sell his garden nursery business in Tansley, Derbyshire as a result.

== Private life ==
On his way to the Railway Hotel, Crown Square, Matlock in 1940 where he met his future wife following the evacuation from Dunkirk. Hilton later went on to marry Lady Winifred Smith in Belfast at the Methodist Church, Donegal Square on 8 January 1942. During the North African campaign Hilton kept a private diary with the first entry being written on 14 February 1942. He wrote the diary in secret, noting: "I'm not writing every day and we're not allowed to keep diaries, for fear of information being given away to the enemy" Its contents were professions of love for his wife. The couple went on to have two sons, Andrew and Richard. Richard Hilton (his younger son) died in his sleep at Alton Manor in December 1969.

During his life he received a tribute from a group of German veterans. Hilton also received an Afrika Korps badge from Manfred Rommel son of Erwin Rommel at a reunion for the British Eighth Army.

== Death ==
Hilton had spent six weeks as an inpatient at Derbyshire Royal Infirmary. He died shortly after returning home in 1995; his wife Winifred and his son Andrew were at his bedside.

=== Funeral ===
A service took place at Derby Cathedral. Subsequently, a private burial followed whereby he was laid to rest at Idridgehay. Due to his fondness for flowers it was requested that any floral tributes or donations be made directly to the Marie Curie Cancer Care or alternatively Thomas Greatorex Funeral Directors on Matlock Green, Matlock, Derbyshire.

A book of remembrance was also open for signatures at Derby Council House, Derby, England on 12 and 13 June 1995.

His adversaries who he fought against in the Second World War sent wreaths to his funeral; namely, German Army chiefs based in Darmstadt and a Panzer tank regiment.

== Legacy ==
Sir Peter Hilton Court at the University of Derby is named in his honour.

Sir Peter Hilton Memorial Gardens in Derby are dedicated to his memory.

The Wirksworth Memorial Gardens were remodeled in 1997 a dedication to his memory.

During his life he presented 30 young trees to the Duke of Devonshire to be planted in Chatsworth Park.

== Honours and awards ==
- Military Cross (UK, September 1942)
- Bar to Military Cross (UK, February 1943)
- Second Bar to Military Cross (UK, December 1944)
- Mentioned in Dispatches (UK)
- Knight of the Order of St. John (18 December 1980)
- Ukrainian Gold Cross (1990)
- Knight Commander of the Royal Victorian Order (UK, 12 June 1993)
- Gold Badge of the Royal British Legion (UK)

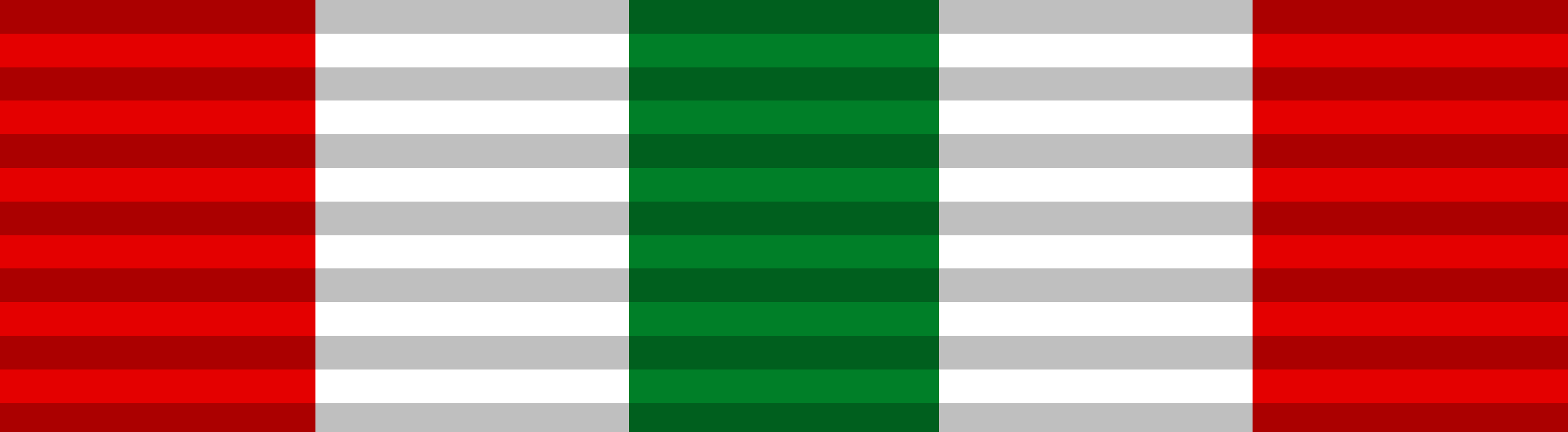

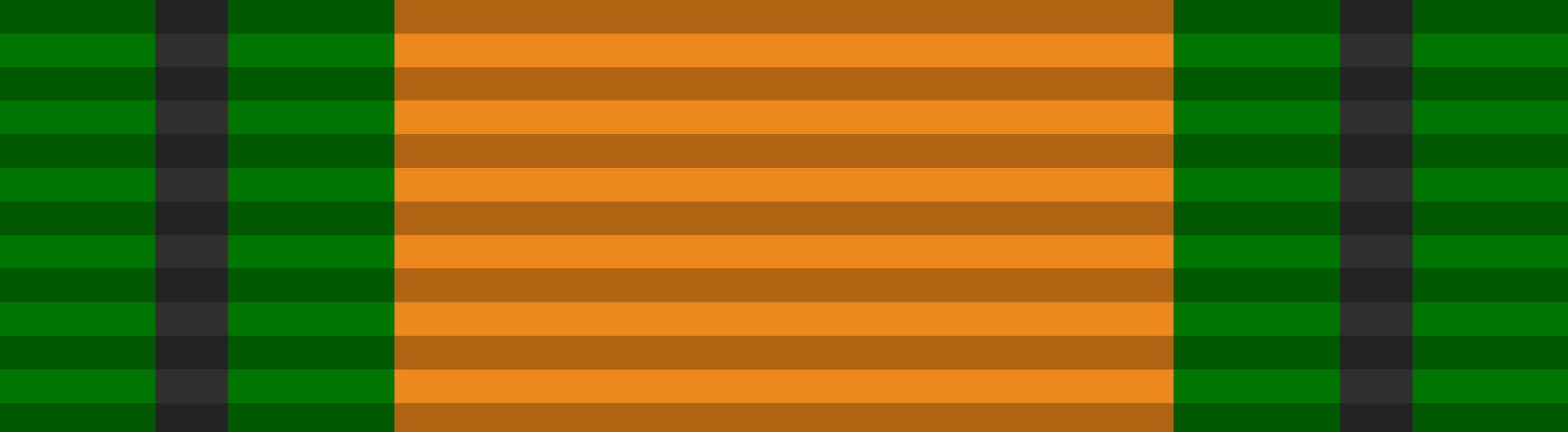

Honorary titles
| Preceded by Sir Ian Walker-Okeover, Bt | Lord Lieutenant of Derbyshire; 1978–1994 | Succeeded by John Knollys Bather |
