= William Hilton =

William Hilton may refer to:

- William Hilton (Irish politician) (died 1651), Irish politician, barrister and judge
- William Hilton Jr. (1617–1675), English explorer
- William Hilton (painter) (1786–1839), British portrait and history painter
- William Hilton II (1886–1964), American business executive and conservationist
- William Hilton (British politician) (1926–1999), British politician and trade unionist
