= Edward Hilton =

- Born: c.1840 Lucknow
- Died: 19 December 1922; Lucknow
- Writing career
- Subject: Lucknow history

Edward Henry Hilton (c.1840 – 19 December 1922) was a former pupil of La Martiniere Boys' College in Lucknow, Uttar Pradesh, India, who was involved in the siege of Lucknow and the defence of the Residency during the Indian Mutiny of 1857. His father William Hilton was the Sergeant Instructor at the College and was also involved in the siege. Hilton was seventeen years old at the time and played an active part in the fighting. He wrote an eye-witness account of the battle which is an invaluable record for historians. His father, William, was awarded an Indian Mutiny Medal, but Edward seems to have missed out on this honour. Hilton later married Ellen Saunders, a girl who had shared the experience with him, and they lived to celebrate their golden wedding anniversary.

Hilton lived throughout his life in Lucknow and was privileged to serve as a guide and narrator when the Residency was visited by Royalty and other dignitaries. In his obituary in The Times it was reported that "He never tired of the epic story, and told it with freshness and zest, readily answering any questions the visitor might put." He was the author of two guide books to Lucknow.

Hilton was buried with full military honours in the graveyard attached to the ruined Residency. The mourners included the head of the province, the general officer commanding the Lucknow district, and the principal residents.

== Publications ==
- The Tourist's Guide to Lucknow in five chapters by one of the beleaguered garrison. First published in 1894 by London Printing Press, Lucknow, pp163. A revised and illustrated ninth edition was published in 1916 by F W Perry, Lucknow.
- The Martiniere Boys in the Bailey Guard (Lucknow: American Methodist Mission Press, 1877, 18pp).
- Hilton's guide to Lucknow and the residency (Calcutta: H R Hilton, 1928, 108pp)
- The Mutiny Records, Oudh and Lucknow (1856-57), (Lahore: Sang-e-Meel Publications, 2004) ISBN 969-35-1630-3.
