= Richard Hilton (British Army officer) =

British soldier and author (1894–1978)

Major-General Richard Hilton DSO MC DFC & Bar
- Born: Richard Hilton; 18 January 1894; Rawalpindi, British India
- Died: 26 July 1978 (aged 84); Buckingham Hotel, Buxton, Derbyshire, England
- Burial place: Idridgehay, Derbyshire, England
- Spouse: Phyllis Martha Woodin (m. 1917)
- Children: Sir Peter Hilton (son); John Hilton (son)
- Relatives: John Edward Hilton (father)
- Military career
- Allegiance: United Kingdom
- Branch: British Army
- Service years: 1913 – 1948
- Rank: Major-General
- Commands: 1st Heavy Regiment, Royal Artillery (1939–1940); Chief Instructor, School of Artillery (1940–1941); Royal Artillery, 15th Infantry Division (Northwestern Europe) (1941–1944); Deputy Head of Mission to Soviet Zone, Germany (1947–1948); Military Attaché to Soviet Union (1947–1948)
- Known for: Accepted the German surrender in Norway
- Conflicts: First World War; Second World War
- Awards: Distinguished Service Order; Military Cross; Distinguished Flying Cross; Knight of the Royal Norwegian Order of Saint Olav
- Other work: Politicalian, journalist, author

Major-General Richard Hilton DSO, MC, DFC and Bar (18 January 1894 – 26 July 1978) was a British soldier, pilot, author, and far-right politician who saw active service in both World wars.

He also wrote under the name Zakhmi Dil, the title of a Pathan marching song which means "Wounded Heart".

== Early life ==
Hilton was born at Rawalpindi, British India, the son of John Edward Hilton, a civil engineer in the Indian service. At the age of three, he was sent to England to live with an uncle at Ruxley in Kent, and the Diamond Jubilee of Queen Victoria was his earliest memory.

He was educated from 1907 to 1911 at Malvern College and from 1912 to 1913 at the Royal Military Academy, Woolwich, from where he was commissioned into the Royal Garrison Artillery in December 1913.

== Career ==
Hilton saw active service in the First World War and trained as a pilot. In June 1916, he was a Lieutenant in the Royal Artillery and was awarded the Military Cross, and on 21 September 1918 gained the Distinguished Flying Cross, with the citation noting that he was "a most courageous and determined officer who has rendered valuable service." On 8 August, he had landed a badly damaged aircraft safely, after escaping an attack by five enemy machines.

By 1938, Hilton was Chief Instructor at the School of Artillery, then from 1941 to 1944 was commanding officer of the Royal Artillery's 15th Infantry Division.

In January 1943, Hilton was promoted from Lieutenant Colonel to Colonel and temporary Brigadier.

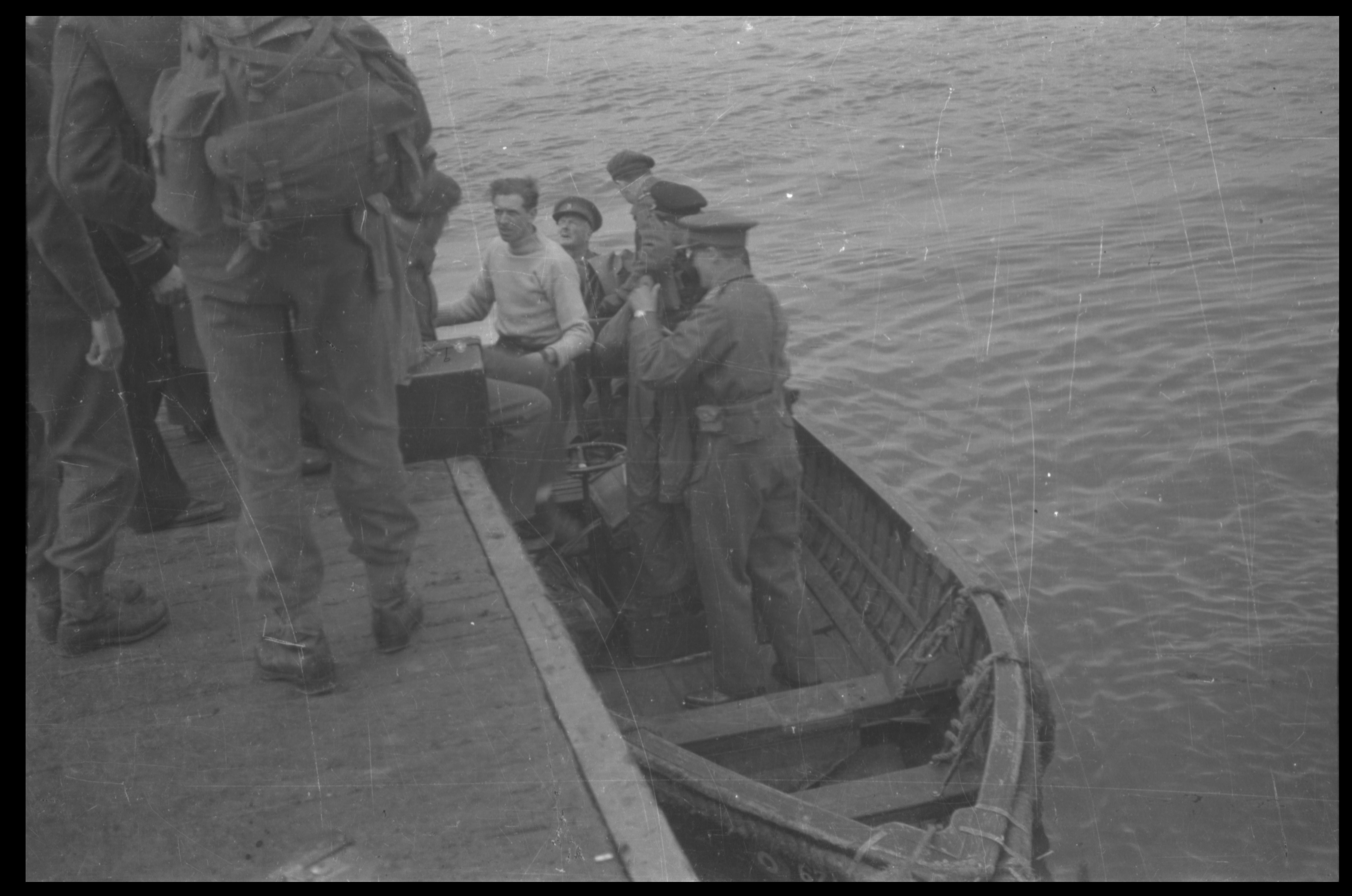
Hilton, sitting at back of boat, on 8 May 1945

On 8 May 1945, VE Day, he led a party of seventeen Allied Military Commission Officers from Woodhaven, Fife, travelling by Sunderland and Catalina seaplanes to the Fornebu sea plane harbour near Oslo. Sent by General Sir Andrew Thorne, his mission was to hand over the Instrument of Surrender to the German forces occupying Norway, commanded by General Böhme. Hilton accepted the surrender and was later awarded the Norwegian Order of St. Olav. He remained in Oslo as General Staff Brigadier, Allied Forces Norway.

A linguist, speaking eleven languages, including Russian, from 1946 to 1947 Hilton was deputy head of the British Military Mission to the Soviet Military Administration in Germany, based at the headquarters of Marshal Sokolovsky in Potsdam. In August 1947, Hilton was granted the local rank of Major-General. His last posting, from 1947 to 1948, was as military attaché at the British embassy in the Soviet Union, about which period he later published a memoir.

In May 1948, he was promoted to Brigadier, still with the local rank of Major-General, and on 11 October 1948 retired with the substantive rank of Brigadier.

In retirement, Hilton became a journalist and a leading member of the League of Empire Loyalists, but had left it by 1959.

In 1958, Hilton published The Thirteenth Power. The title refers to "the power of international money-lending on the grand scale", which he believed was ubiquitous and tyrannical and would come to control a new world government. A reviewer noted that Hilton's criterion for praise or blame was "does this individual, or nation, or tendency, conform to my idea of British Interests?"

In 1962, Hilton founded a group called the True Tories, with a membership largely made up of old soldiers, which for the 1964 general election became the Patriotic Party. The party received less than 2,000 votes nationally. After the election he re-established the True Tories, and in 1966 he was president of the National Youth League.

In the 1960s he became associated with the British National Party, before the remnants of both the Patriotic Party and the True Tories were absorbed by the National Front on its foundation in 1967.

In his book Imperial Obituary (1968), Hilton surveyed events since 1945 and concluded that Britain's loss of great power status was the result of Communist infiltration spearheaded by the London School of Economics.

== Personal life ==
In 1917, Hilton married Phyllis Martha Woodin, daughter of the Rev. Stanley Hassall Woodin of the Isle of Wight, and they had two sons. Their son Sir Peter Hilton followed his father into the Royal Artillery and later served as Lord Lieutenant of Derbyshire.

Hilton died on 26 July 1978 while living at the Buckingham Hotel, Buxton, Derbyshire. His widow survived him until 1980.

== Selected publications ==
- Richard Hilton, Military Attaché in Moscow (London: Hollis & Carter, 1949)
- Richard Hilton, Nine Lives: the Autobiography of an Old Soldier (London: Hollis & Carter, 1955)
- Richard Hilton, The Indian Mutiny: A Centenary History (London: Hollis & Carter, 1957)
- Richard Hilton, The North-west Frontier: a true story for boys, illustrated by Klaus Meyer (London: Hollis & Carter, 1957)
- Richard Hilton, The Thirteenth Power: the Middle East and the World Situation (London: Christopher Johnson, 1958)
- Richard Hilton, Imperial Obituary: the Mysterious Death of the British Empire (Devon: Britons Publishing, 1968)

== Honours and awards ==
- Distinguished Service Order (UK, October, 1944)
- Military Cross (UK, June 1916)
- Distinguished Flying Cross (UK, September 1918)
- Bar to Distinguished Flying Cross (UK)
- Knight of the Royal Norwegian Order of St. Olav (Norway)

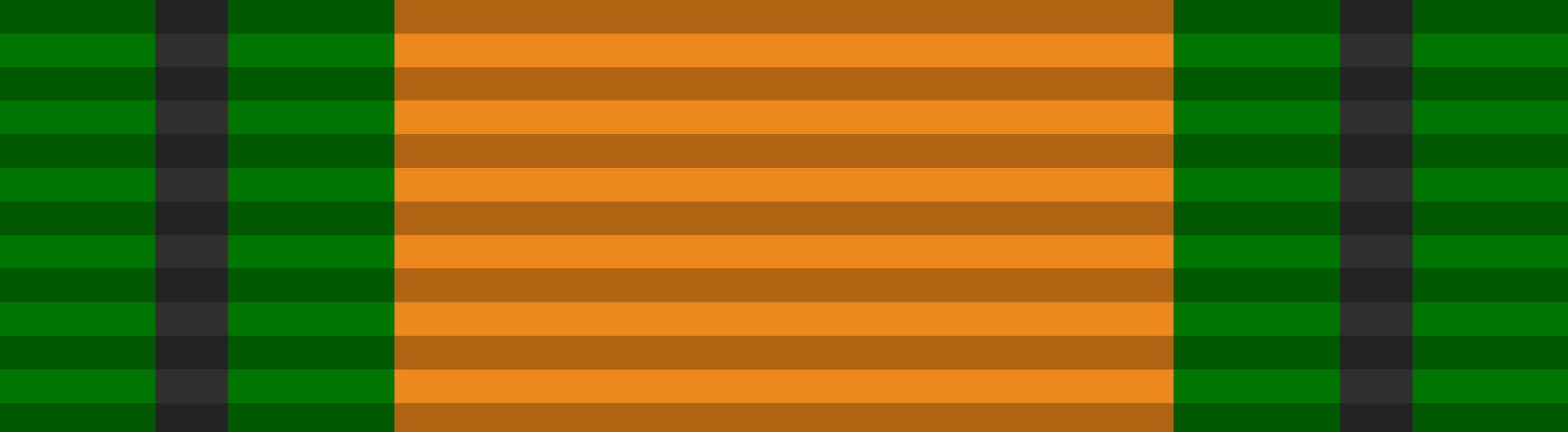
