= List of automobile drag coefficients =

List of drag coefficients and drag areas for automobiles

This is a list of automobile drag coefficients (Cd) and drag areas (CdA) for production, limited-production, and concept or experimental vehicles. The drag coefficient is a dimensionless measure of aerodynamic resistance used in automotive design; a lower value indicates a more streamlined vehicle that passes through the air with less resistance. The drag area (CdA) is the product of the drag coefficient and the vehicle's frontal reference area, and represents the total aerodynamic drag force per unit of dynamic pressure — making it a more complete measure of real-world aerodynamic performance than the drag coefficient alone.

Entries are grouped first by drag coefficient and then by drag area. Within each grouping, production vehicles and concept or experimental vehicles are listed separately. Unless otherwise noted, figures given are for the base model of a vehicle in a standard configuration. Measurements can vary by up to 5% depending on the wind tunnel and test methodology used.

== Drag coefficients ==
The average modern automobile achieves a drag coefficient of between 0.25 and 0.3. Sport utility vehicles (SUVs), with their typically boxy shapes, typically achieve a Cd=0.35–0.45. The drag coefficient of a vehicle is affected by the shape of body of the vehicle. Various other characteristics affect the coefficient of drag as well, and are taken into account in these examples. Some sports cars have a surprisingly high drag coefficient (such as the Ariel Atom at 0.40), but this is to compensate for the amount of lift the vehicle generates, while others use aerodynamics to their advantage to gain speed and as a result have much lower drag coefficients.

Some examples of Cd follow. Figures given are generally for the basic model, which may not be available in some markets. Some "high performance" models may actually have higher drag, due to wider tires, extra spoilers and larger cooling systems as many basic/low power models have half size radiators with the remaining area blanked off to reduce cooling and engine bay drag.

The Cd of a given vehicle will vary depending on which wind tunnel it is measured in. Variations of up to 5% have been documented and variations in test technique and analysis can also make a difference. So if the same vehicle with a drag coefficient of Cd=0.30 was measured in a different tunnel it could be anywhere from Cd=0.285 to Cd=0.315.

=== Production cars ===
Production cars — drag coefficient (Cd)
| Cd | Automobile | Calendar Year |
|---|---|---|
| 0.7 to 1.1 | typical values for a Formula One car (downforce settings change for each circuit) | |
| 0.74 | Legends car | |
| 0.7 | Caterham Seven | |
| 0.65 to 0.75 | Lotus Seven | 1957–1972 |
| 0.6 + | a typical truck | |
| 0.59 | Land Rover Defender | 2008 |
| 0.57 | Hummer H2 | 2003 |
| 0.54 | Mercedes Benz G-Class | |
| 0.51 | Volkswagen Westfalia Camper | 1980–1991 |
| 0.51 | Citroën 2CV | 1948 |
| 0.48 | Rover Mini | 1998 |
| 0.48 | Volkswagen Beetle (original design) | 1938 |
| 0.48 | Volkswagen Cabriolet (Rabbit Convertible) | 1979–1993 |
| 0.47 | Lancia Aprilia | 1937 |
| 0.46 | Ford Mustang (coupe) | 1979 |
| 0.46 | Lincoln Town Car (sedan) | 1985–1989 |
| 0.454 | Jeep Wrangler (JL) | 2018 |
| 0.45 | Dodge Viper RT/10 | 1996 |
| 0.45 | Mercury Grand Marquis (sedan) | 1988–1991 |
| 0.45 | Range Rover Classic | 1990 |
| 0.45 | Volkswagen Gol G1 | 1980 |
| 0.44 | Volkswagen Vanagon | 1980–1991 |
| 0.44 | Ford Mustang (fastback) | 1979 |
| 0.44 | Peugeot 305 | 1978 |
| 0.44 | Peugeot 504 | 1968 |
| 0.44 | Toyota Truck | 1990 |
| 0.43 | TVR 3000S | 1978–79 |
| 0.425 | Duple 425 coach (named for its low Cd by coach standards) | 1985 |
| 0.42 | Lamborghini Countach | 1974 |
| 0.42 | Plymouth Duster | 1994 |
| 0.42 | Triumph Spitfire Mk IV | 1971 |
| 0.41 | Smart Roadster | 2003 |
| 0.41 | Volvo 740 (sedan) | 1982 |
| 0.405 | Subaru Forester | 1997–2002 |
| 0.40 | Chevrolet Astro | 1995–2005 |
| 0.40 | Mercury Cougar | 1983–1986 |
| 0.40 | Ariel Atom | 2002 |
| 0.40 | Ford Escape Hybrid | 2005 |
| 0.40 | Nissan Skyline GT-R R32 | 1989 |
| 0.40 | Jaguar XJS | 1976–1996 |
| 0.40 | Ford Ranger | 2011–2015 |
| 0.39 | Chevrolet Tahoe | 2006 |
| 0.39 | MG ZR | 2001 |
| 0.39 | Dodge Durango | 2004 |
| 0.39 | Ford Aerostar | 1995 |
| 0.39 | Ford Escort 5 Door | 1981–1984 |
| 0.39 | Honda Odyssey | 1994–98 |
| 0.39 | Toyota Tacoma (N300) | 2016 |
| 0.39 | Triumph Spitfire | 1964 |
| 0.385 | Nissan 280ZX | 1978 |
| 0.38 | Fiat Ritmo | 1978 |
| 0.38 | Ford Territory | 2011 |
| 0.38 | Jaguar Mark II Sedan | 1959 |
| 0.38 | Lexus GX | 2003 |
| 0.38 | Lincoln Mark VII | 1984–1992 |
| 0.38 | Mazda Miata | 1989 |
| 0.38 | Fiat 500 | 1957 |
| 0.38 | Smart Roadster Coupé | 2003 |
| 0.38 | Subaru Forester | 2009–2013 |
| 0.38 | VW NewBeetle without wing or spoiler 0.39 | 2003 |
| 0.374 | Ford Capri Mk III | 1978 |
| 0.372 | Ferrari F50 | 1996 |
| 0.37 | Ford Escort Mk.III (Europe) | 1980 |
| 0.37 | BMW Z3 M coupe | 1999 |
| 0.37 | Jaguar XJ (X300/X308) | 1994–2003 |
| 0.37 | Mercury Grand Marquis | 1998–2002 |
| 0.37 | Mercury Grand Marquis | 2003–2011 |
| 0.37 | Renault Twingo I | |
| 0.37 | Volkswagen Tiguan | 2008 |
| 0.37 | Volkswagen Transporter T4 | 1990–2004 |
| 0.36 | Alfa Romeo 33 | 1983 |
| 0.36 | Cadillac Escalade hybrid | 2008 |
| 0.36 | Cadillac Fleetwood | 1996 |
| 0.36 | Citroën CX (named after the term for Cd) | 1974 |
| 0.36 | Citroën DS | 1955 |
| 0.36 | Chrysler Sebring | 1996 |
| 0.36 | Ferrari Testarossa | 1986 |
| 0.36 | Ford Escort | 1997–2002 |
| 0.36 | Ford Focus 3-door | 2000–2004 |
| 0.36 | Ford Mustang | 1999 |
| 0.36 | Honda Civic | 2001–2005 |
| 0.36 | Lincoln Town Car | 1990–1997 |
| 0.36 | Mercury Cougar | 1987–1988 |
| 0.36 | Mercury Grand Marquis | 1992–1997 |
| 0.36 | Mitsubishi Magna, V3000 sedan | 1985–1991 |
| 0.36 | Mitsubishi Lancer Evolution IX | 2006 |
| 0.36 | Subaru Impreza WRX | 2010 |
| 0.36 | Saturn SW | 1996–2001 |
| 0.36, 0.244 (1:5) | Tatra 87 | 1936–1950 |
| 0.36 | Toyota Celica Convertible | 1994–1999 |
| 0.36 | Volkswagen Jetta | 1985–1992 |
| 0.36 | Tatra 77 & Tatra 77A | 1934–1936 |
| 0.357 | Ram 1500 Quad Cab 4x2 | 2018 |
| 0.355 | NSU Ro 80 | 1967 |
| 0.355 | Ford Focus RS | 2016 |
| 0.35 | Maserati Quattroporte V | 2003 |
| 0.35 | Aleko 2141 | 1986–2002 |
| 0.35 | Aston Martin Vanquish | 2004 |
| 0.35 | BMW M3 Convertible | 2005 |
| 0.35 | BMW Z4 M coupe | 2006 |
| 0.35 | DeltaWing (endurance racing car) | 2012 |
| 0.35 | Dodge Viper GTS | 1996 |
| 0.35 | Ford Thunderbird | 1983–1988 |
| 0.35 | Ford Windstar | 1995–1998 |
| 0.35 | Ford Windstar | 1999–2003 |
| 0.35 | Honda del Sol | 1992–1997 |
| 0.35 | Jaguar XKR | 2005 |
| 0.35 | Lexus GX | 2010 |
| 0.35 | Lexus RX | 2003–2009 |
| 0.35 | MINI Cooper | 2008 |
| 0.35 | Mitsubishi Lancer Evolution X | 2008 |
| 0.35 | Nissan Cube | 2009 |
| 0.35 | Renault Clio (Mk 2) | 2002 |
| 0.35 | SSC Ultimate Aero | 2007–2013 |
| 0.35 | Tesla Roadster | 2008 |
| 0.35 | Mitsubishi i-MiEV | 2011 |
| 0.35 | Smart ForTwo | 2008– |
| 0.35 | Toyota MR-2 | 1998 |
| 0.35 | Toyota Previa | 1991–1997 |
| 0.35 | Toyota Sequoia | 2007 |
| 0.35 | Volvo 940 (sedan) | 1990 |
| 0.348 | Toyota Celica Supra (Mk 2) | 1982 |
| 0.347 | Hyundai Tiburon (RD1) | 1997 |
| 0.342 | Toyota Celica (Liftback Model) | 1982 |
| 0.34 | Alfa Romeo Giulia sedan | 1968–1972 |
| 0.34 | Aston Martin DB9 | 2004 |
| 0.34 | Audi TT MK1 (8N) | 1998–2005 |
| 0.34 | Chevrolet Caprice | 1994 |
| 0.34 | Chevrolet C6 Corvette Z06 | 2006–2013 |
| 0.34 | Chevrolet Tahoe hybrid | 2008 |
| 0.34 | Ferrari 360 Modena | 1999 |
| 0.34 | Ferrari F40 | 1987 |
| 0.34 | Ferrari F430 F1 | 2004 |
| 0.34 | Fiat Uno | 1984–1989 |
| 0.34 | Ford Puma | 1997 |
| 0.34 | Ford Sierra | 1982 |
| 0.34 | Geo Metro (Hatchback) | 1995–1997 |
| 0.34 | Volkswagen Gol G2 | 1994 |
| 0.34 | Honda Prelude | 1988 |
| 0.34 | Mercedes-Benz SL (Roof Down) | 2001 |
| 0.34 | Mitsubishi Lancer Evolution X | 2014 |
| 0.34 | Nissan Altima | 1993–1997 |
| 0.34 | Nissan Skyline R34 GT-R | 1999–2002 |
| 0.34 | Peugeot 106 | 1991 |
| 0.34 | Saab 900 NG | 2003 |
| 0.34 | Saab 9000 | 1984–1998 |
| 0.34 | Saturn SL2 | 1991–1995 |
| 0.34 | Subaru Impreza WRX (4 Door) | 2009 |
| 0.34 | Subaru Legacy Wagon | 1993–1999 |
| 0.34 | Toyota Corolla (Wagon) | 1993–1997 |
| 0.34 | Toyota Supra (with factory 3 piece turbo wing) | 1989–1990 |
| 0.339 | Citroen SM | 1970–1975 |
| 0.338 | Chevrolet Camaro | 1995 |
| 0.335 | Tesla Cybertruck | 2024 |
| 0.334 | Seat Leon FR | 2005–2011 |
| 0.33 | Acura Integra | 1993–2001 |
| 0.33 | Acura RSX | 2002–2006 |
| 0.33 | Alfa Romeo Giulia (saloon) | 1962 |
| 0.33 | Audi A3 | 2006 |
| 0.33 | BMW E30 M3 | 1986–1992 |
| 0.33 | Chevrolet Caprice (sedan) | 1991–1996 |
| 0.33 | Chevrolet Impala | 2006 |
| 0.33 | Dodge Charger | 2006 |
| 0.33 | Ford Crown Victoria | 1992 |
| 0.33 | Ford Escort ZX2 | 1998–2003 |
| 0.33 | Ford Fusion | 2010 |
| 0.33 | Holden Commodore (VT) sedan | 1997 |
| 0.33 | Honda Accord Sedan | 2002 |
| 0.33 | Honda Civic Hatchback | 1988–1991 |
| 0.33 | Honda S2000 | 2000–2009 |
| 0.33 to 0.37 | Koenigsegg Agera R | 2013 |
| 0.33 | Lamborghini Murciélago | 2001 |
| 0.33 | Lexus RX | 2010 |
| 0.33 | Mazda RX-7 FC3C | 1987 |
| 0.33 | Nissan 200SX Coupe | 1995–1998 |
| 0.33 | Peugeot 206 | 1998 |
| 0.33 | Dodge Durango (without roof-rack), ("HEAT" model, 0.325) | 2011–present |
| 0.33 | Peugeot 309 | 1986 |
| 0.33 | Renault Modus | 2004 |
| 0.33 | Saab 9-3 SC | 2003 |
| 0.33 | Saturn SL2 | 1999 |
| 0.33 | Subaru Impreza WRX STi | 2004 |
| 0.33 | Subaru Forester | 2014–2018 |
| 0.33 | Toyota Camry (Sedan) | 1991 |
| 0.33 | Toyota Corolla (E100) | 1993–1997 |
| 0.33 | Toyota Supra (without wing) | 1989–1990 |
| 0.329 | Chevrolet Corsica | 1989–2006 |
| 0.325 | Opel Astra J | 2009 |
| 0.324 | Cobalt SS Supercharged | 2005 |
| 0.321 | Toyota Matrix | 2003–2008 |
| 0.32 | Mitsubishi RVR | 2010 |
| 0.32 | Buick Riviera | 1995 |
| 0.32 | BMW M3 Coupe | 2005 |
| 0.32 | Daewoo Espero | 1990 |
| 0.32 | Dodge Avenger | 1995 |
| 0.32 | Ferrari California | 2008 |
| 0.32 | Chrysler 300C | 2011–2014 |
| 0.32 | Fiat Croma | 1985–1996 |
| 0.32 | Ford Taurus | 1992–1995 |
| 0.32 | Geo Metro (Sedan) | 1995–1997 |
| 0.32 | Seat Leon | 2005–2011 |
| 0.32 | Honda Accord (Coupe) | 2002 |
| 0.32 | Honda Ascot Innova (Sedan) | 1992–1996 |
| 0.32 | Honda Civic (Coupe) | 1992–1995 |
| 0.32 | Honda Civic (Hatchback DX) | 1996–2000 |
| 0.32 | Honda Civic (Sedan EX) | 1996–2000 |
| 0.32 | Honda NSX | 1990 |
| 0.32 | Hyundai Veloster | 2012 |
| 0.32 | Jaguar XJ (X350) | 2006 |
| 0.32 | Koenigsegg CCX | 2006 |
| 0.32 | Mazdaspeed3 | 2007 |
| 0.32 | McLaren F1 | 1992 |
| 0.32 | Mercedes-Benz 190E 2.5-16/2.3-16 | 1983–1990 |
| 0.32 | Nissan 240SX Coupe | 1995–1998 |
| 0.32 | Nissan 300ZX | 1989 |
| 0.32 | Nissan Altima | 1998–2001 |
| 0.32 | Nissan Maxima | 1997 |
| 0.32 | Oldsmobile Aurora | 1995–1999 |
| 0.32 | Porsche 997 GT2 | 2008–2013 |
| 0.32 | Peugeot 406 | 1995 |
| 0.32 | Peugeot 806 | 1994 |
| 0.32 | Saab Sonett II | 1966–1969 |
| 0.32 | Scion xB | 2008 |
| 0.32 | Suzuki Swift | 1991 |
| 0.32 | Tatra 600 | 1948–1952 |
| 0.32 | Toyota Celica | 1994 |
| 0.32 | Toyota Celica | 2000–2005 |
| 0.32 | Toyota Supra (N/A with wing and turbo models) | 1993 |
| 0.32 | Toyota Supra (with factory turbo wing) | 1987–1988 |
| 0.32 | Toyota Tercel Sedan | 1995–2000 |
| 0.32 | Toyota Corolla Hatchback (E210, US) | 2019 |
| 0.32 | Volkswagen Golf Mk3 | 1991 |
| 0.32 | Volkswagen GTI Mk V | 2006 |
| 0.32 | Volvo V50 | 2004 |
| 0.315 | Saturn SL1 | 1996–1999 |
| 0.31 | Alfa Romeo 156 | 1997–2007 |
| 0.31 | Audi A4 B5 | 1995 |
| 0.31 | Audi A5 | 2011–2016 |
| 0.31 | Audi A3 | 2014 |
| 0.31 | BMW 7 Series | 2009 |
| 0.31 | Buick Park Avenue | 1996 |
| 0.31 | Cadillac CTS | 2004 |
| 0.31 | Cadillac CTS-V | 2005 |
| 0.31 | Citroën AX | 1986 |
| 0.31 | Citroën GS | 1970 |
| 0.31 | Eagle Vision | 1995 |
| 0.31 | Ford Focus sedan | 2000–2004 |
| 0.31 | Fiat Coupé | 1995 |
| 0.31 | Fiat Tipo | 1988–1995 |
| 0.31 | Ford Falcon | 1995 |
| 0.31 | Ford Thunderbird | 1989–1997 |
| 0.31 | Holden Commodore | 1998 |
| 0.31 | Honda Civic (Hatchback) | 1992–1995 |
| 0.31 | Honda Civic (Sedan) | 2006 |
| 0.31 | Infiniti G37 (Coupe) | 2008–2015 |
| 0.31 | Kia Rio (Sedan) | 2001 |
| 0.31 | Lamborghini Diablo | 1990 |
| 0.31 | Lexus LFA (wing retracted) | 2010 |
| 0.31 | Mazda MX-3 | 1990–1996 |
| 0.31 | Mazda MX-6 | 1992–1997 |
| 0.31 | Mazda RX-7 FC3S | 1986 |
| 0.31 | Mazda RX-7 FD R1(R2) | 1993 |
| 0.31 | Mazda RX-8 | 2004 |
| 0.31 | Mazda2 (Hatchback) | 2010–2014 |
| 0.31 | Mazda3 (Hatchback) | 2010–2013 |
| 0.31 | Nissan Tiida / Versa | 2004 |
| 0.31 | Opel Tigra | 1994–2000 |
| 0.31 | Pagani Huayra | 2012 |
| 0.31 | Peugeot 307 | 2001 |
| 0.31 | Peugeot 405 | 1987 |
| 0.31 | Porsche 997 Turbo/GT3 | 2006 |
| 0.31 | Renault 25 | 1984 |
| 0.31 | Saab Sonett III | 1970–1974 |
| 0.31 | Saab 9-3 Viggen | 2003 |
| 0.31 | Saab 9-5 Wagon (2000–2010) | 2003 |
| 0.31 | Saturn SC2 | 2001 |
| 0.31 | Scion xA | 2004 |
| 0.31 | Toyota Avalon | 1995–2000 |
| 0.31 | Toyota Corolla (E110) | 1998–2002 |
| 0.31 | Toyota Corolla (E210, UK) | 2019 |
| 0.31 | Toyota Paseo | 1995–1999 |
| 0.31 | Toyota RAV4 | 2006 |
| 0.31 | Toyota Supra (N/A; without factory wing) | 1993 |
| 0.31 | Volkswagen GTI Mk IV | 1997 |
| 0.31 | Volkswagen Golf Mk6 | 2008–2012 |
| 0.31 | Volvo S40 2nd generation | 2003 |
| 0.308 | Chevrolet Bolt | 2016 |
| 0.308 | Škoda Octavia RS | 2005 |
| 0.304 | Ford Probe | 1988–1992 |
| 0.30 | Lotus Elan+2 | 1967–1974 |
| 0.30 | Alfa Romeo 164 | 1988 |
| 0.30 | Audi 100 | 1983 |
| 0.30 | BMW 5 Series (E34) | 1988 |
| 0.30 | BMW 3 Series (F30/F31) 335i | 2012 |
| 0.30 | Citroën XM | 1989 |
| 0.30 | Fiat Uno facelift | 1989–2000 |
| 0.30 | Ford Taurus | 1996–1999 |
| 0.30 | Ford Focus Wagon | 2000–2004 |
| 0.30 | Ford Focus ST | 2013–2018 |
| 0.30 | Honda Accord Sedan | 2003, 2005–2007 |
| 0.30 | Honda CRX DX/Si | 1988 |
| 0.30 | Honda NSX | 2002 |
| 0.30 | Hyundai Sonata | 2006 |
| 0.30 | Koenigsegg CCX | 2006 |
| 0.30 | Mitsubishi Eclipse | 2000 |
| 0.30 | Nissan 180SX | 1989 |
| 0.30 | Nissan 300ZX | 1983 |
| 0.30 | Nissan 350Z Coupe Base and Enthusiast models | 2003–2008 |
| 0.30 | Nissan 370Z Coupe (0.29 with sport package) | 2009 |
| 0.30 | Peugeot 207 | 2006–2014 |
| 0.30 | Renault 19 16V | 1991 |
| 0.30 (Manufacturer claim. Independent test measured 0.322) | Rivian R1T | 2022-Present |
| 0.30 | Saab 92 | 1947 |
| 0.30 | Seat Leon | 2012 |
| 0.30 | Toyota Camry (Sedan) | 1996 |
| 0.30 | Toyota Corolla (E120) | 2003–2008 |
| 0.30 | Toyota Corolla (E210, Europe, Hatchback) | 2019 |
| 0.30 | Toyota Sienna | 2003–2009 |
| 0.30 | Volkswagen Bora mk4 | 1999–2005 |
| 0.30 (Note: North American market) | Mercedes-Benz CLA 250 | 2013–2018 |
| 0.299 | Cadillac ATS | 2012 |
| 0.296 | Chevrolet Impala (I4) | 2013 |
| 0.295 | Ford Focus Mk.III hatchback (0.274 sedan) | 2011 |
| 0.291 | Toyota Avalon | 2005 |
| 0.29 | Subaru Alcyone/XT Coupe | 1985–1989 |
| 0.29 | Alfa Romeo 155 | 1992 |
| 0.29 | Alfa Romeo MiTo | 2011 |
| 0.29 | Audi A4 sedan | 2007 |
| 0.29 | BMW 3 Series (F30/F31) 328i | 2012 |
| 0.29 (Note: 0.30 with range extender) | BMW i3 | 2013 |
| 0.29 | Chevrolet Corvette | 2005 |
| 0.29 | Chevrolet Cruze sedan | 2016 |
| 0.29 | Fiat Tipo | 2015 |
| 0.29 | Ford Escape | 2010 |
| 0.29 | Ford Focus C-Max | 2003 |
| 0.29 | Honda Accord Coupe | 2003, 2005–2007 |
| 0.29 | Honda Accord Hybrid | 2005, 2007 |
| 0.29 | Honda CRX HF | 1988 |
| 0.29 | Kia Niro Hybrid/EV Compact SUV | 2016 |
| 0.29 | Lancia Dedra | 1990 |
| 0.29 | Lexus LS 400 | 1990 |
| 0.29 | Mazda3 (sedan) | 2009 |
| 0.29 | Mercedes-Benz C-Class Sportscoupe | 2001 |
| 0.29 | Nissan Leaf | 2010 |
| 0.29 | Rover 75 | 1998 |
| 0.29 | Saab 9-5 (1998–2009) | 2003 |
| 0.29 | Toyota Corolla L/LE sedan (E170), (E210) | 2013 (E170), 2019 (E210) |
| 0.29 | Toyota Platz | 2000–2005 |
| 0.29 | Toyota Prius | 2001 |
| 0.29 | Toyota Yaris (hatchback & sedan) | 2006–2011 |
| 0.29 | Volvo C70 | 1998 |
| 0.29 | NIO ES8 | 2017 |
| 0.29 | Škoda Scala | 2019–present |
| 0.288 | Chrysler Concorde | 1998–2001 |
| 0.286 | Perodua Bezza | 2016 |
| 0.286 | Chevrolet Corvette C6 (coupe) | 2005–2013 |
| 0.285 | Chevrolet Volt | 2016 |
| 0.285 | Dodge Dart (PF) | 2012 |
| 0.285 | Opel Astra K Hatchback | 2015 |
| 0.284 | Volkswagen Passat CC | 2008–2017 |
| 0.281 | Chevrolet Volt | 2010–2015 |
| 0.28 | Alfa Romeo Giulietta Sprint Speciale | 1959 |
| 0.28 | Audi A2 1.4 TDI | 2000 |
| 0.28 | Citroën C4 | 2004 |
| 0.28 | Fiat Croma Nuova | 2005–2011 |
| 0.28 | Honda Civic Hybrid | 2003–2005 |
| 0.28 | Honda Insight | 2009–2014 |
| 0.28 | Hyundai Elantra | 2011 |
| 0.28 | Hyundai Sonata (0.25 for the Hybrid) | 2011–2013 |
| 0.28 | Lexus IS | 2006–present |
| 0.28 | Opel Omega (sedan) | 1986–1993 |
| 0.28 | Saab 9-3 SS | 2003 |
| 0.28 | Škoda Fabia IV | 2021–present |
| 0.28 | Rumpler Tropfenwagen | 1921–1925 |
| 0.28 | Toyota Camry XV40, XV50 | 2006–2018 |
| 0.28 | Toyota Corolla (E210, Europe, Saloon) | 2019 |
| 0.28 | Maserati Quattroporte VI | 2013 |
| 0.28 | NIO ES6 | 2018 |
| 0.275 | Ford Fusion | 2013 |
| 0.274 | Peugeot 207 Economique | 2009 |
| 0.273 | Ford Focus Mk IV hatchback (0.25 sedan) | 2018 |
| 0.27 | BMW 5 Series (E39) | 1996 |
| 0.27 (Note: European market) | BMW 3 Series (F30/F31) 320d | 2012 |
| 0.27 | Hyundai Elantra | 2016 |
| 0.27 | Hyundai Sonata | 2019 |
| 0.27 | Mazda6 (sedan and hatchback) | 2008 |
| 0.27 | Mercedes-Benz S Class (0.268 with Sport Package) | 1998–2005 |
| 0.27 | Subaru BRZ and Toyota 86 | 2012 |
| 0.27 | Toyota Avalon (XX50) | 2018 |
| 0.27 (Note: w/ 17-inch wheels) | Toyota Prius (XW60) LE | 2023 |
| 0.27 | Volkswagen Jetta Mk7 | 2018 |
| 0.263 | NIO ES7 | 2022 |
| 0.26 | BMW 3 Series (F30/F31) 320d EfficientDynamics | 2012 |
| 0.26 | BMW 3 Series (E90) (0.26–0.30) | 2009 |
| 0.26 | BMW i8 | 2015 |
| 0.26 | Infiniti Q70 Hybrid / Nissan Fuga Hybrid (0.27 for ICE version) | 2015 |
| 0.26 | Jaguar XE | 2014 |
| 0.26 | Mazda3 (Sedan) | 2012 |
| 0.26 | Mercedes-Benz C-Class Coupe | 2015–2018 |
| 0.26 | Nissan Altima (6th gen.) | 2018 |
| 0.26 | Nissan Sylphy (B18) | 2019 |
| 0.26 | Opel Calibra 8-valve | 1989 |
| 0.26 | Audi e-tron Sportback | 2020 |
| 0.26 | NIO EC6 | 2020 |
| 0.25 | BMW iX | 2020 |
| 0.25 (Manufacturer claim. Independent test measured 0.26.) | Toyota Prius | 2009–2015 |
| 0.25 | Honda Insight | 1999–2006 |
| 0.25 (w/ air suspension); 0.26 (non-air suspension) | Lexus LS430 | 2001–2006 |
| 0.250 | Nio ES6 | 2023 |
| 0.250 | NIO ES8 | 2023 |
| 0.249 | Škoda Octavia MkIV liftback | 2020 |
| 0.24 | Tesla Model X | 2018 |
| 0.24 | Hyundai Ioniq | 2016–2022 |
| 0.24 | Kia Optima Hybrid | 2016 |
| 0.24 | Mercedes-Benz S 350 BlueTec | 2013 |
| 0.24 | Mercedes-Benz C 220 BlueTec BlueEfficiency Sedan | 2014–2016 |
| 0.24 | Tesla Model S | 2012 |
| 0.24 | Toyota Prius | 2016 |
| 0.24–0.30 | BMW i4 eDrive40 | 2021 |
| 0.236 | Xpeng P7 | 2020 |
| 0.23 | Audi A4 2.0 TDI ultra (110 kW) | 2015 |
| 0.23 | Alfa Romeo Giulia Advanced Efficiency | 2016 |
| 0.23 | BMW 320d (G20) | 2018 |
| 0.23 | Tesla Model 3 | 2017 |
| 0.230 | NIO EC7 | 2023 |
| 0.22 (Note: in Range mode in combination with a low level and closed air intake flaps) | Porsche Taycan Turbo | 2019 |
| 0.22 | BMW 5 series (G30) 520d EfficientDynamics | 2017 |
| 0.22 | Mercedes-Benz CLA 180 BlueEfficiency Sedan | 2013 |
| 0.215 | Li Auto Mega | 2023 |
| 0.212 (1:5 model test, 1:1 car = 0.36, see above) | Tatra T77A | 1935 |
| 0.208 | NIO ET7 | 2021 |
| 0.208 | Tesla Model S | 2021 |
| 0.20 (Note: w/ 19-inch AMG wheel/tire combination in "Sport" driving mode) | Mercedes-Benz EQS | 2021 |
| 0.197 (Note: w/ 19-inch wheel/tire combination) | Lucid Air | 2022 |
| 0.195 | Xiaomi SU7 | 2024 |
| 0.19 | General Motors EV1 | 1996 |
| 0.19 | Volkswagen XL1 | 2013 |
| 0.175 | Lightyear 0 | 2022 |

=== Concept and experimental cars ===
Concept/experimental cars — drag coefficient (Cd)
| Cd | Automobile | Calendar Year |
|---|---|---|
| 0.29 | FSM Beskid Polish hatchback prototype | 1983 |
| 0.27 | Avion | 1986 |
| 0.26 | Alfa Romeo Disco Volante | 1952 |
| 0.25 | BMW Kamm-Coupé | 1938 |
| 0.25 | Dymaxion Car | 1933 |
| 0.25 | SmILE (an experimental car) | 1996 |
| 0.23 | Volvo ECC | 1992 |
| 0.23 | Pininfarina X (Morelli shape) | 1960 |
| 0.22 | BMW Vision EfficientDynamics Concept | 2009 |
| 0.22 | Citroën ECO 2000 Concept | 1981 |
| 0.22 | Aurel Persu Streamliner | 1923 |
| 0.20 | Opel Eco-Speedster | 2002 |
| 0.20 | Loremo Concept | 2006 |
| 0.19 | Alfa Romeo B.A.T. 7 Concept | 1954 |
| 0.19 | Dodge Intrepid ESX Concept | 1995 |
| 0.19 | General Motors Ultralite | 1992 |
| 0.19 | Mercedes-Benz Bionic Concept (based on the boxfish) | 2005 |
| 0.170 | Chrysler Ghia Dart | 1955 |
| 0.170 | Mercedes-Benz Vision EQXX | 2022 (Cd figure measured in the Daimler aero-acoustic wind tunnel at a wind speed of 140 km/h) |
| 0.168 | Daihatsu UFE-III Concept | 2005 |
| 0.16 | General Motors Precept Concept (5 seats) | 2000 |
| 0.16 | Edison2 Very Light Car, Automotive X Prize winner | 2010 |
| 0.159 | Volkswagen 1-litre car Concept | 2002 |
| 0.157 | Li-ion Motors Wave II, Automotive X Prize winner | 2010 |
| 0.15 | Schlörwagen | 1939 |
| 0.15 | Aptera 2 Series 2e Prototype | 2011 |
| 0.15 | Keris RV Nakoela Team (Shell Eco-marathon) Prototype | 2015 |
| 0.149–0.150 | Urbee 2 | 2013 |
| 0.147 | JCB Dieselmax land speed record holder | 2006 |
| 0.14 | Fiat Turbina Concept | 1954 |
| 0.137 | Ford Probe V Concept | 1985 |
| 0.13 | Aptera Sol Prototype | 2021 |
| 0.125 | Sunraycer, solar race car | 1987 |
| 0.12 | Reflex 1000, solar cycle | 1996 |
| 0.12 | Panhard CD LM64 | 1964 |
| 0.117 | Summers Brothers Goldenrod Bonneville race car | 1965 |
| 0.116 | TUT Sunchaser 4 | 2022 |
| 0.095 | Sunswift 7 (Guinness World Record Holder, World Solar Challenge Winner) | 2022 |
| 0.08 | Fortis Saxonia (Shell Eco-marathon) Concept | 2007 |
| 0.072 | Alérion Supermileage (Shell Eco-marathon) Prototype | 2013 |
| 0.07 | Nuna, World Solar Challenge winner | 2001–2007 |
| 0.0512 | Ecorunner V (Shell Eco-marathon) Prototype | 2015 |
| 0.048 | Ecorunner VI (Shell Eco-marathon) Prototype | 2016 |
| 0.045 | Ecorunner 8 (Shell Eco-marathon) Prototype | 2018 |

== Drag areas ==
The drag area (CdA) is the product of the drag coefficient (Cd) and the vehicle's frontal reference area. It provides a single value that directly determines the aerodynamic drag force at a given speed, making it a more complete basis for comparison than Cd alone. In 2003, Car and Driver magazine adopted this metric as a more intuitive way to compare the aerodynamic efficiency of various automobiles. Average full-size passenger cars have a drag area of roughly 8 sq ft (0.74 m^{2}). Reported drag areas range from the 1999 Honda Insight at 5.1 sq ft (0.47 m^{2}) to the 2003 Hummer H2 at 26.5 sq ft (2.46 m^{2}). The drag area of a bicycle (and rider) is also in the range of 6.5–7.5 sq ft (0.60–0.70 m^{2}).

=== Production cars ===
Automobile examples of CdA
| CdA sqft | CdA m2 | Automobile model |
|---|---|---|
| 5.2 sq ft | 0.48 m^{2} | 2019 Mercedes-Benz A 180 d (V177) |
| 5.3 sq ft | 0.49 m^{2} | 2013 Mercedes-Benz CLA 180 BlueEfficiency |
| 5.4 sq ft | 0.50 m^{2} | 1989 Opel Calibra (8 valve) |
| 5.5 sq ft | 0.51 m^{2} | 2015 Audi A4 2.0 TDI ultra (110 kW) |
| 5.52 sq ft | 0.513 m^{2} | 2019 Porsche Taycan Turbo |
| 5.6 sq ft | 0.52 m^{2} | 2017 BMW 520d EfficientDynamics |
| 5.6 sq ft | 0.52 m^{2} | 1993 Mazda RX-7 FD (base model) |
| 5.70 sq ft | 0.530 m^{2} | 1985 Subaru Alcyone/XT/Vortex |
| 5.71 sq ft | 0.530 m^{2} | 1990 Honda CR-X Si |
| 5.74 sq ft | 0.533 m^{2} | 2002 Acura NSX |
| 5.76 sq ft | 0.535 m^{2} | 1968 Toyota 2000GT |
| 5.80 sq ft | 0.539 m^{2} | 1986 Toyota MR2 |
| 5.81 sq ft | 0.540 m^{2} | 1989 Mitsubishi Eclipse GSX |
| 5.86 sq ft | 0.544 m^{2} | 2001 Audi A2 1.2 TDI 3L |
| 5.88 sq ft | 0.546 m^{2} | 1990 Nissan 240SX / 200SX / 180SX |
| 5.90 sq ft | 0.548 m^{2} | 1992 Mazda Xedos 6 |
| 5.90 sq ft | 0.548 m^{2} | 2015 BMW i8 |
| 5.92 sq ft | 0.550 m^{2} | 1994 Porsche 911 Speedster |
| 5.95 sq ft | 0.553 m^{2} | 1990 Mazda RX7 |
| 5.96 sq ft | 0.554 m^{2} | 1993 Mazda RX-7 FD R1(R2) |
| 6.0 sq ft | 0.56 m^{2} | 2001 Honda Insight |
| 6.00 sq ft | 0.557 m^{2} | 1992 Subaru SVX |
| 6.00 sq ft | 0.557 m^{2} | 1970 Lamborghini Miura |
| 6.05 sq ft | 0.562 m^{2} | 2012 Tesla Model S P85 |
| 6.08 sq ft | 0.565 m^{2} | 2008 Nissan GTR |
| 6.08 sq ft | 0.565 m^{2} | 1989 Geo Metro |
| 6.13 sq ft | 0.569 m^{2} | 1991 Acura NSX |
| 6.17 sq ft | 0.573 m^{2} | 1995 Lamborghini Diablo |
| 6.19 sq ft | 0.575 m^{2} | 1981 Citroën GSA X3 |
| 6.20 sq ft | 0.576 m^{2} | 2014 Toyota Prius |
| 6.24 sq ft | 0.580 m^{2} | 2004 Toyota Prius |
| 6.27 sq ft | 0.583 m^{2} | 1986 Porsche 911 Carrera |
| 6.27 sq ft | 0.583 m^{2} | 1992 Chevrolet Corvette |
| 6.35 sq ft | 0.590 m^{2} | 1999 Lotus Elise |
| 6.37 sq ft | 0.592 m^{2} | 2000 Vauxhall VX220 N/A |
| 6.40 sq ft | 0.595 m^{2} | 1990 Lotus Esprit |
| 6.41 sq ft | 0.596 m^{2} | 2003 Smart Roadster Coupé |
| 6.54 sq ft | 0.608 m^{2} | 1991 Saturn Sports Coupe |
| 6.57 sq ft | 0.610 m^{2} | 1985 Chevrolet Corvette |
| 6.63 sq ft | 0.616 m^{2} | 2001 Audi A2 |
| 6.66 sq ft | 0.619 m^{2} | 1996 Citroën Saxo |
| 6.70 sq ft | 0.622 m^{2} | 2014 Chevrolet Volt |
| 6.77 sq ft | 0.629 m^{2} | 1995 BMW M3 |
| 6.79 sq ft | 0.631 m^{2} | 1993 Toyota Corolla DX |
| 6.80 sq ft | 0.632 m^{2} | 2007 BMW 335i Coupe |
| 6.81 sq ft | 0.633 m^{2} | 1991 Subaru Legacy |
| 6.89 sq ft | 0.640 m^{2} | 2019 Renault Clio V |
| 6.90 sq ft | 0.641 m^{2} | 1993 Saturn Wagon |
| 6.93 sq ft | 0.644 m^{2} | 1982 DMC DeLorean |
| 6.94 sq ft | 0.645 m^{2} | 2003 Smart Roadster |
| 6.96 sq ft | 0.647 m^{2} | 1988 Porsche 944 S |
| 7.00 sq ft | 0.650 m^{2} | 2013 Mercedes-Benz CLA250 |
| 7.02 sq ft | 0.652 m^{2} | 1992 BMW 325I |
| 7.04 sq ft | 0.654 m^{2} | 1991 Honda Civic EX |
| 7.06 sq ft | 0.656 m^{2} | 2004 Vauxhall VX220 Turbo |
| 7.10 sq ft | 0.660 m^{2} | 1995 Saab 900 |
| 7.11 sq ft | 0.661 m^{2} | 1991 Ford Thunderbird LX |
| 7.13 sq ft | 0.662 m^{2} | 1970 Citroën SM |
| 7.14 sq ft | 0.663 m^{2} | 1995 Subaru Legacy L |
| 7.20 sq ft | 0.669 m^{2} | 1995 Nissan Maxima GLE |
| 7.34 sq ft | 0.682 m^{2} | 2001 Honda Civic |
| 7.39 sq ft | 0.687 m^{2} | 1994 Honda Accord EX |
| 7.4 sq ft | 0.69 m^{2} | 2018 BMW X1 sDrive18i |
| 7.48 sq ft | 0.695 m^{2} | 1993 Chevrolet Camaro Z28 |
| 7.57 sq ft | 0.703 m^{2} | 1992 Toyota Camry |
| 7.63 sq ft | 0.709 m^{2} | 1974 Citroën CX |
| 7.69 sq ft | 0.714 m^{2} | 1994 Chrysler LHS |
| 7.72 sq ft | 0.717 m^{2} | 1993 Subaru Impreza |
| 7.80 sq ft | 0.725 m^{2} | 2012 Nissan Leaf SL |
| 8.02 sq ft | 0.745 m^{2} | 2005 Bugatti Veyron |
| 8.1 sq ft | 0.75 m^{2} | 2016 Renault Zoe |
| 8.70 sq ft | 0.808 m^{2} | 1990 Volvo 740 Turbo |
| 8.70 sq ft | 0.808 m^{2} | 1992 Ford Crown Victoria |
| 8.71 sq ft | 0.809 m^{2} | 1991 Buick LeSabre Limited |
| 8.79 sq ft | 0.817 m^{2} | 1956 Citroën DS Spécial |
| 9.54 sq ft | 0.886 m^{2} | 1992 Chevrolet Caprice Wagon |
| 9.6 sq ft | 0.89 m^{2} | 2010 Chrysler PT Cruiser |
| 9.95 sq ft | 0.924 m^{2} | 2016 Chrysler Pacifica |
| 10.7 sq ft | 0.99 m^{2} | 1992 Chevrolet Blazer |
| 11.6 sq ft | 1.08 m^{2} | 2005 Ford Escape Hybrid |
| 11.7 sq ft | 1.09 m^{2} | 1993 Jeep Grand Cherokee |
| 12.2 sq ft | 1.13 m^{2} | 1949 Nash Airflyte |
| 13.0 sq ft | 1.21 m^{2} | 2019 Ram 1500 |
| 13.1 sq ft | 1.22 m^{2} | 2021 Jeep Wagoneer (WS) |
| 16.8 sq ft | 1.56 m^{2} | 2006 Hummer H3 |
| 17 sq ft | 1.6 m^{2} | 2013 Mercedes-Benz G-Class |
| 17.4 sq ft | 1.62 m^{2} | 1995 Land Rover Discovery |
| 26.5 sq ft | 2.46 m^{2} | 2003 Hummer H2 |

=== Limited production cars ===
Limited production cars — drag area (CdA)
| CdA sqft | CdA m2 | Automobile model |
|---|---|---|
| 3.00 sq ft | 0.279 m^{2} | 2011 Volkswagen XL1 |
| 3.95 sq ft | 0.367 m^{2} | 1996 GM EV1 |

=== Concept and experimental cars ===
Concept/experimental cars — drag area (CdA)
| CdA sqft | CdA m2 | Automobile model |
|---|---|---|
| 0.21 sq ft | 0.020 m^{2} | Pac-car II |
| 2.04 sq ft | 0.190 m^{2} | 2011 Aptera 2 Series |
| 2.10 sq ft | 0.195 m^{2} | 2013 Urbee 2 |
| 2.50 sq ft | 0.232 m^{2} | 1986 Twike |
| 2.54 sq ft | 0.236 m^{2} | 2002 Opel Eco-Speedster |
| 2.69 sq ft | 0.250 m^{2} | 2009 Loremo |
| 2.78 sq ft | 0.258 m^{2} | 2010 Edison2 Very Light Car |
| 3.27 sq ft | 0.304 m^{2} | 1987 Renault VESTA II |
| 4.72 sq ft | 0.439 m^{2} | 2014 Volkswagen XL Sport |
| 5.00 sq ft | 0.465 m^{2} | 2005 Mercedes-Benz Bionic |

== See also ==
- Automobile drag coefficient
- Automotive aerodynamics
- Drag (physics)
- Drag equation
- Drag area
- Fuel efficiency in transportation
