= Green vehicles (disambiguation) =

Green vehicles may refer to:

- Green Vehicles, maker of the Triac (car)
- Green vehicle - Environmentally friendly vehicles.
