= Duke Electric Vehicles =

Undergraduate engineering team

Duke Electric Vehicles (DEV)
- Founded: October 2011; 14 years ago
- Headquarters: Durham, NC, United States
- Parent: Duke University

The Duke Electric Vehicles (DEV) team is composed of undergraduates at Duke University's Pratt School of Engineering. The team designs, builds, and competes with a crewed, electrically powered supermileage vehicle each year. The team was founded in 2011 and has competed in the Shell Eco-Marathon Americas for 7 years. On July 21, 2018, their hydrogen fuel cell vehicle, "Maxwell", achieved the world record for the most fuel efficient prototype vehicle with a fuel efficiency of 14,573 MPGe, previously set in 2005 by ETH Zurich's Pac-car II at 12,600 MPGe.

== History ==
Originally Duke Eco-Marathon, Duke Electric Vehicles was founded in 2011. It has competed in the Shell Eco-Marathon Americas prototype battery-electric category each year since then with the following outcomes.

- 2014 2nd place Prototype Battery-electric : 310 mi/kWh
- 2015 2nd place Prototype Battery-electric : 214 mi/kWh
- 2015 Technical Innovation
- 2016 3rd place Prototype Battery-electric : 252.1 mi/kWh
- 2017 1st place Prototype Battery-electric : 295.7 mi/kWh
- 2018 1st place Prototype Battery-electric : 367.9 mi/kWh
- 2018 1st place Prototype Hydrogen : 383.1 mi/m^3
- 2018 Technical Innovation

== Vehicle Design ==
=== "Maxwell" (2018) ===
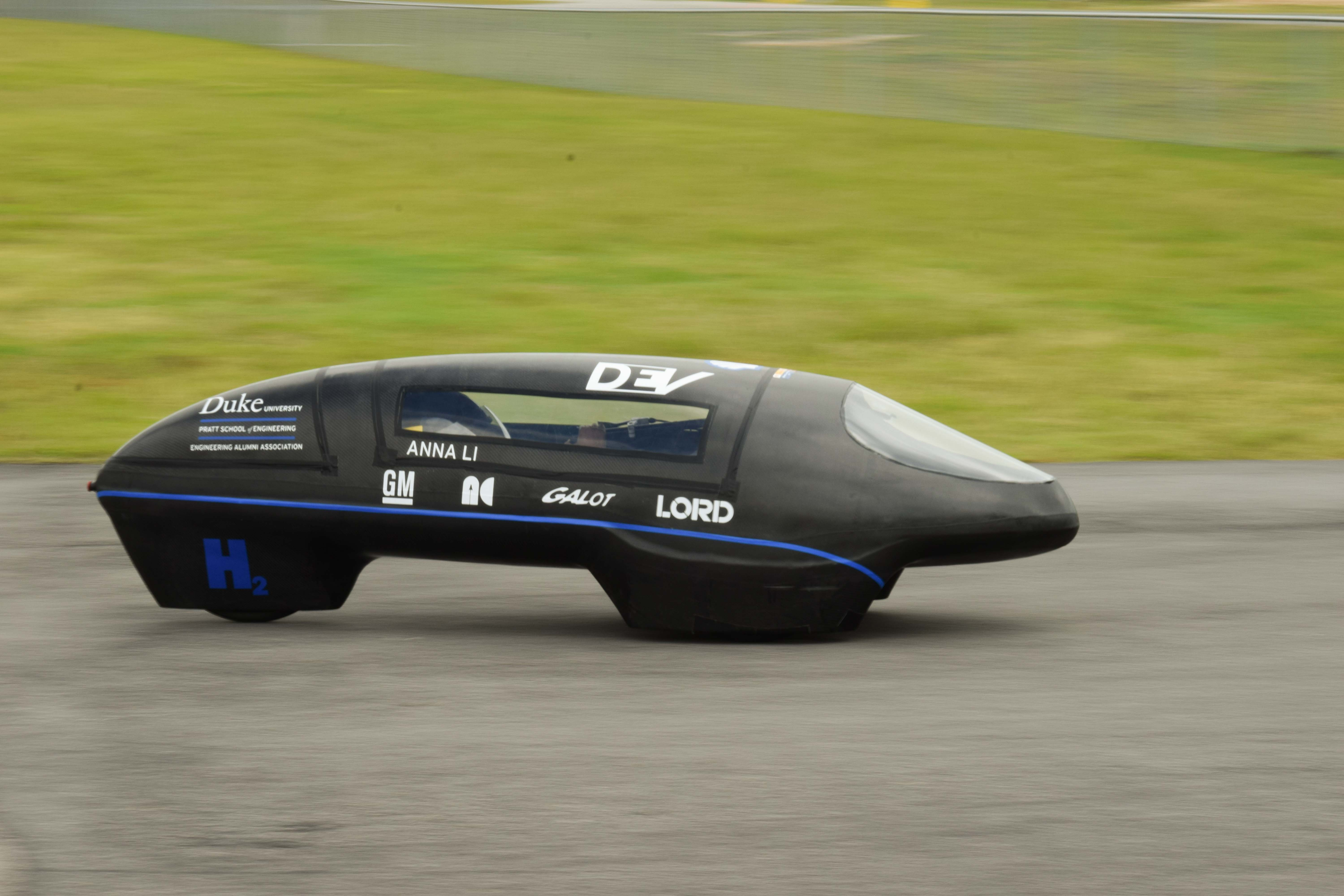
Maxwell during world record attempt

The Maxwell vehicle utilizes a carbon-fiber monocoque body with aluminum steering, motor mount, and safety harnesses fastened to the body via carbon fiber inserts. Although originally competing in the battery-electric category for the 2017 and 2018 Shell Eco-Marathon, Maxwell was outfitted with a hydrogen powertrain for the world record attempt. The vehicle is chain-driven by a 3-phase brushless motor transmitting power to the rear wheel.

=== "Gemini" (2018) ===
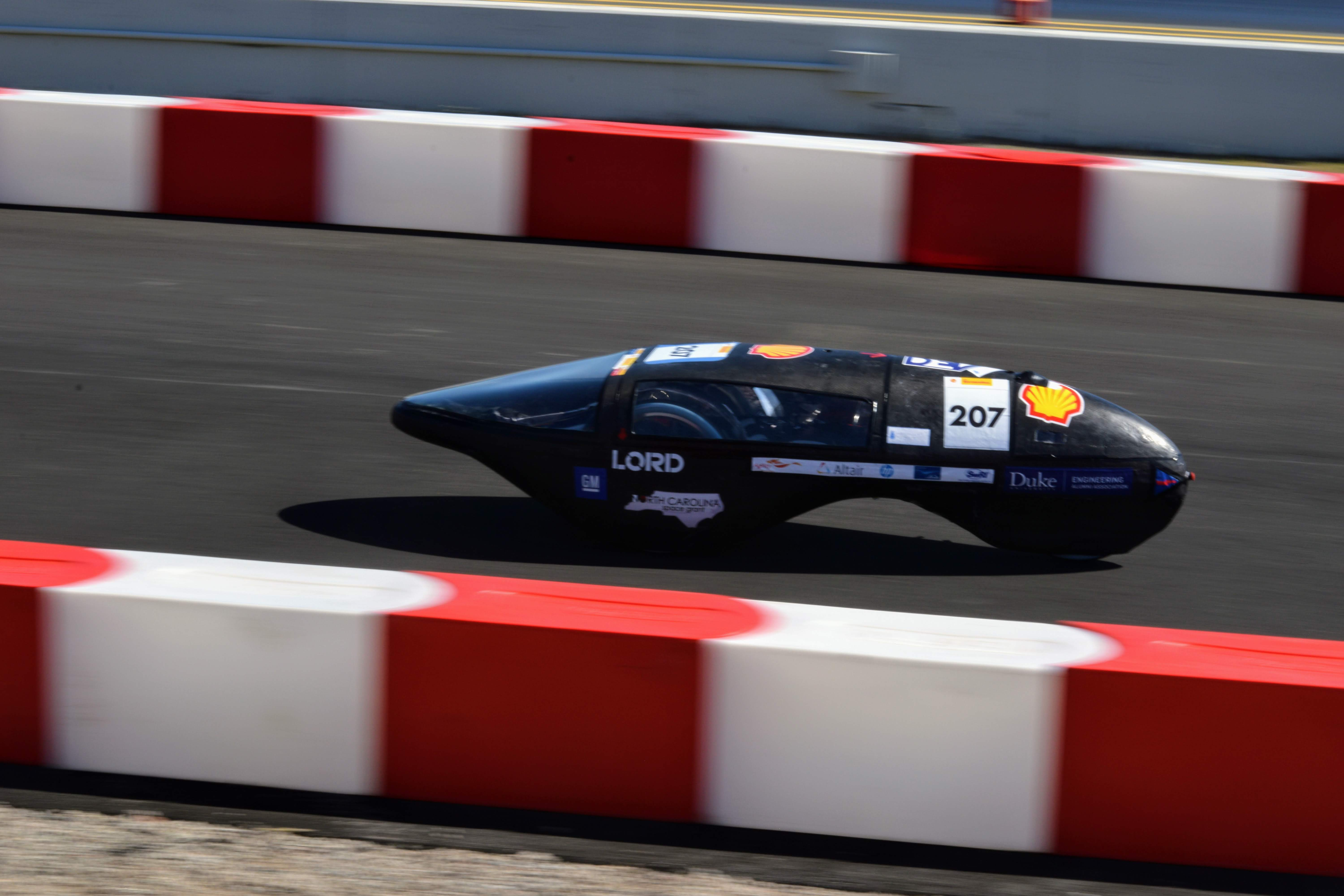
Gemini during the 2018 Eco-Marathon

The Gemini vehicle utilizes a carbon-fiber monocoque body with aluminum steering, motor mount, and safety harnesses fastened to the body via carbon fiber inserts. The vehicle is propelled by a 3-phase brushless hub motor modified from an electric bike. The electrical power is generated by a Horizon H-100 fuel cell supplied by pure hydrogen gas.

Gemini achieved 1st place in the prototype hydrogen category at the 2018 Shell Eco-Marathon Americas at Sonoma, CA. The innovations in Gemini's electrical system and fuel cell research also earned it a technical innovation award at the 2018 Shell Eco-Marathon Americas. Research and implementation of the new powertrain was led by Gerry Chen and Shomik Verma, under the supervision of club president Patrick Grady. Experimental schematics of the system were made available online.

== Guinness World Record ==
On July 21, 2018, Duke Electric Vehicle's "Maxwell" hydrogen fuel cell vehicle achieved the world record for the most fuel efficient prototype vehicle. The vehicle's efficiency is recorded as 0.01614 liters of 95 grade petrol (equivalent) per 100 kilometers of driving distance. This is equivalent to 14,573 MPGe.
