= Triac =

Triac may refer to:

- TRIAC (triode for alternating current), an electronics component
- Triac (car), a concept car by Green Vehicles Inc.
- Tiratricol, a common thyroid hormone analogue used for treating thyroid hormone resistance syndrome
