= Drag area =

In mechanics and aerodynamics, the drag area of an object represents the effective size of the object as it is "seen" by the fluid flow around it. The drag area is usually expressed as a product $C_d A,$ where $A$ is a representative area of the object, and $C_d$ is the drag coefficient, which represents what shape it has and how streamlined it is.

The drag coefficient plays a role in Reynold's drag equation,

$$F_d=\frac{1}{2}\ \rho\ C_d A\ v^2.$$

Here, $F_d$ is the drag force, $\rho$ the density of the fluid, and $v$ the speed of the object relative to the fluid.

== See also ==
- Drag (physics)
- Automobile drag coefficient#Drag area
- Zero-lift drag coefficient
