= General Motors Ultralite =

Low emission vehicle concept car

Overview
- Manufacturer: General Motors
- Production: 1992
- Designer: Burt Rutan

Body and chassis
- Class: Concept car
- Doors: Gullwing

Powertrain
- Engine: 1.5 L two-stroke, three cylinder

Dimensions
- Curb weight: 635 kg (1,400 lb)

The General Motors Ultralite was a 1992 low emission vehicle concept car intended to demonstrate the benefits of advanced materials and low fuel consumption.

== Fuel consumption ==
It was rated at 88 miles per US gallon (2.7 L/100 km; 106 mpg_{‑imp}) by the EPA, but could achieve 100 miles per US gallon (2.4 L/100 km; 120 mpg_{‑imp}) at a steady state cruising speed of 50 mph.

== Design ==
The carbon fiber shell was fabricated by Scaled Composites and it weighed only 420 pounds (191 kg). The total weight of the car was 1,400 pounds (635 kg). The car had gull-wing doors and no B-pillar. The drag coefficient, C_{d}, was 0.19, significantly lower than that of production cars of the decade.

The shape was reminiscent to the Ford Probe concept, and the Ultralite presaged the production General Motors EV1 electric vehicle and other production models.

== Specification ==
The three-cylinder 1.5 L two-stroke engine could produce 111 hp (83 kW), which made a speed of 135 mph (217 km/h) possible. The car could accelerate from 0 to 60 mph (97 km/h) in less than eight seconds.

== In popular culture ==
Due to the unusual design, the Ultralite has been featured in several science fiction productions, most prominently among them was in the 1993 film Demolition Man as the squad cars used by the fictional SAPD (San Angeles Police Department). They also appeared in the second episode of the second season of seaQuest DSV, and in the 1999 movie Bicentennial Man.
