= Triac (car) =

Green Vehicles TRIAC

Overview
- Manufacturer: Green Vehicles Inc.
- Production: 2009-2012

Body and chassis
- Class: Subcompact Electric car
- Layout: RMR layout

Powertrain
- Engine: 20 kW (27 hp) water-cooled AC electric motor
- Transmission: 5-speed manual

Triac, by Green Vehicles Inc., was a two-seat three-wheeled concept car unveiled in 2010–2012. The company went out of business in 2012.

The Triac freeway commuter Early Adopter program closed as of June 15, 2010. The company announced in July 2011 that they will be shutting down all operations. Previously they had been accepting pre-orders for the Triac 3.0 requiring a $500 reservation fee and an anticipated delivery in 2012.

Green Vehicles was originally based in San Jose, California, but the company relocated to an 80,000 sq ft (7,400 m^{2}) facility in Salinas, California.

The TRIAC has a top speed of 80 mph (130 km/h) and a range of 100 miles (160 km), according to the manufacturer. Charging the TRIAC's 165 volt, 180 amp-hour batteries takes approximately 5 hours when the vehicle is plugged into either 180 or 240 volts AC. Triac was designed with a steel safety cage construction with the two front tires controlling steering and front wheel drive.

== See also ==
- Elio Motors
- Aptera Motors
- Hypercar
- Loremo
