= Green Vehicles =

Defunct American motor vehicle manufacturer

Green Vehicles Inc. was a manufacturer of electric cars that operated in California from 2008 to 2011. Their best-known product was the Triac, a three-wheeled car that never entered production.

== History ==
Green Vehicles was co-founded by Ehab Youssef and Mike Ryan in the wake of a failed ZAP! dealership originally in Los Gatos, California. Disappointment in the state of the battery electric vehicle industry at the time led the small company to take on the ambitious goal of making the world's most sustainably made, energy efficient freeway commuter.

In 2008, the company changed course, abandoning its manufacturing base in China for an 80,000 sq ft (7,400 m^{2}) facility in Salinas, California in order to make changes to manufacturing operations more consistent with the principles on which the company was founded. Green Vehicles recently applied to the state of California and received supplemental funds to implement Design for Manufacturability and Design for Environment changes before increasing commercial production volumes of the Triac 2.0.

== Technology ==
VEDA (Vehicle, Efficiency & Data Assistant)- an advanced IT system incorporating a proprietary BMS, data logging, motor controller access and navigation that has been introduced by the company. The company has held details close to its chest, but has said that the system will be part of the commercial Triac2.0.

== Motor ==
The Triac freeway commuter uses a three phase 30 kW Permanent Magnet motor, and has a top speed of 80 MPH and a range of 100 Miles.

== Battery ==
The Triac uses a 144V lithium-ion battery pack

== Models ==
- Triac - freeway commuter
- Moose - electric minivan

== Current ==
The Triac is a lithium-ion powered three-wheeled street legal car. Under most state laws, three-wheeled cars are classified as motorcycles. The first commercial deliveries started in November, 2009 as part of an Early Adopters program.

The company claims that the freeway commuter's design for reducing energy consumption, superior battery solution, and higher efficiency drivetrain offer commuters the most environmentally friendly means for meeting their daily transportation needs. Although Green Vehicles has not publicly released the name of their battery supplier, they have confirmed that they are headquartered in California.

On July 30, 2010, Green Vehicles was awarded a grant for over $2,050,000 by the California Energy Commission to assist the company's efforts to scale up manufacturing operations in Salinas, California.

On July 18, 2011, Green Vehicles announced it had ceased operations, citing a lack of capital. Virtually all of its funding had come from state and local government grants.
