= Pac-car II =

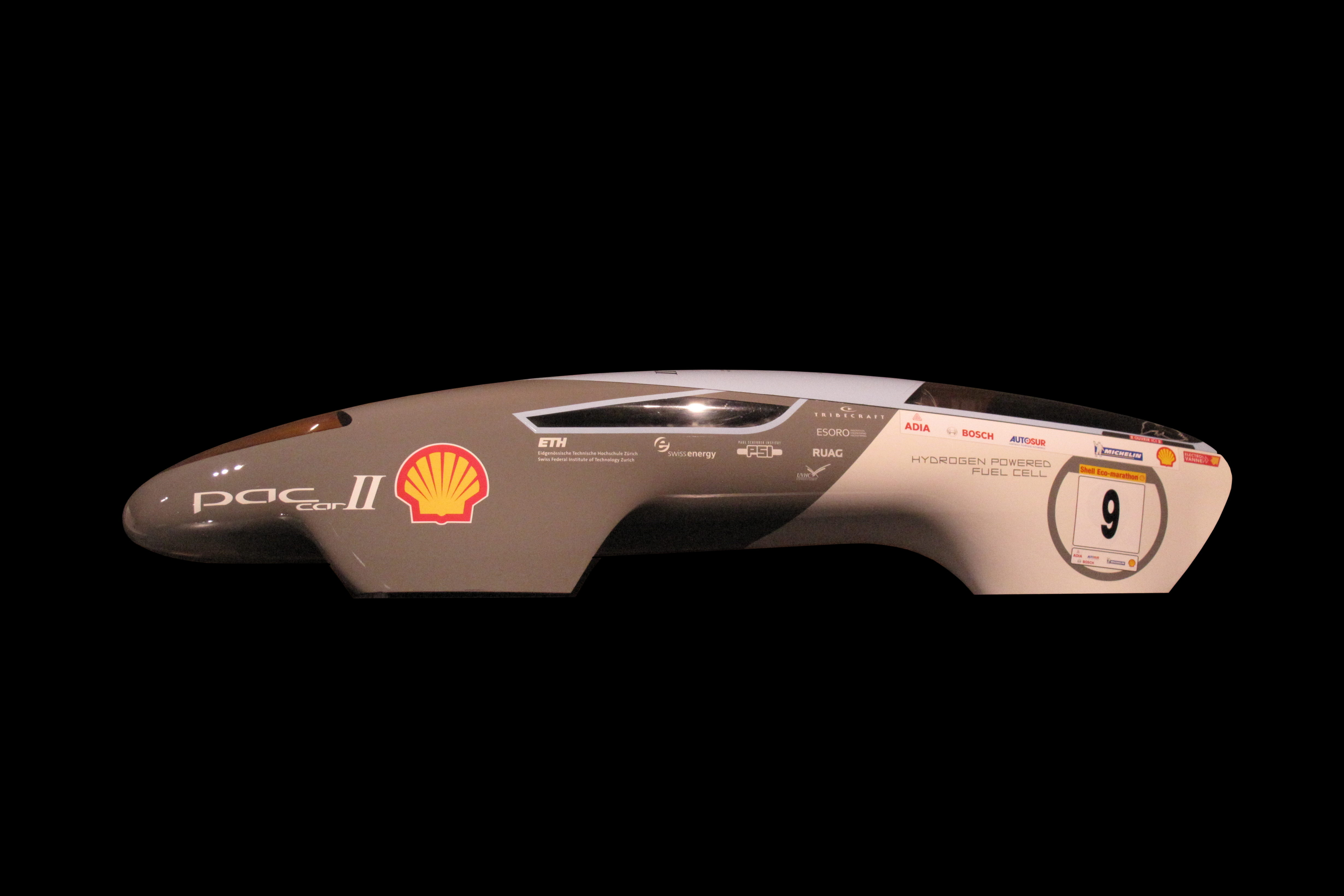
Pac-Car II

Pac-Car II was developed as a student project at ETH Zürich (Swiss Federal Institute of Technology). Based on a group of students and an experienced team leader, the goal was to build a vehicle that uses as little fuel as possible. By using hydrogen fuel-cell, developed at ETH/PSI (Paul Scherrer Institute), as power source, pure water is the car's only emission. Clean mobility completed therefore the educational and energy saving aspects of the project.

== Features ==
- Aerodynamic (drag coefficient of Cd=0.075, A_{f}=0.254 m²)
- A lightweight body (total mass of 29 kg, carbon fibre materials)
- Low rolling resistance of Michelin's Radial Tyres (C_{r}=0.0008)
- Efficient powertrain (almost 50%)
- Use of simulation and optimization tools (CFD, FEM, MATLAB and Simulink, GESOP)

== World record ==
In 2005 on June 26, the PAC-Car II set a new world record in fuel-economy of 5385 km/L gasoline equivalence during the Shell Eco-Marathon in Ladoux, France. During its third race over 20.6 km the car consumed approximately 1 g of Hydrogen driving at an average speed of 30 km/h (roughly 18.6 mph). This corresponds to 0.0186 L/100 km (15,200 mpg_{‑imp}; 12,600 mpg_{‑US}) gasoline equivalence. This record is certified by the Guinness Book of World Records.
