= Loremo =

German automaker company

Loremo AG
- Company type: Public company
- Industry: Automotive industry
- Founded: 2000
- Defunct: 2010
- Headquarters: Marl, Recklinghausen (district), Germany
- Key people: Thomas Zollhoefer

Loremo AG was a German automaker corporation, based in Marl, North Rhine-Westphalia. It was founded in 2000 and went out of business in 2010. Loremo was focused on designing prototypes of cars with very low weight and air resistance, the term "Loremo" is an abbreviation for "Low Resistance Mobile". Initially the car was conceived for emerging markets such as China and India. The project is currently inactive. No plans to restart development are currently known.

== Gasoline and diesel vehicles ==
At the 2006 Geneva Auto Show, the company demonstrated its concept car which the company said would become a 157 mpg_{US} (1.5 L/100 km) turbodiesel car. Two different Loremo models were waiting in the pipeline to be produced: the Loremo LS base model, and the sportier Loremo GT. The Loremo GT would have been based on a three-cylinder turbo diesel engine and with this configuration the vehicle still would have managed to achieve 87 miles per gallon. Both models would have been equipped with a manual transmission and be mid-engined in a 2+2 configuration.

According to the company, the Loremo LS base model would have produced only 50 grams of carbon dioxide per kilometer, which would have been better than any other car on the market in terms of environmental sustainability. By comparison, the next most energy efficient model was the Smart by German automaker Daimler AG which produced 88 grams of carbon dioxide per kilometer.

The presentation of the Loremo during the Geneva Motor Show in 2006 focused on the car's body, as it still lacked an engine. In September 2007, the company successfully accomplished the car's proof of concept in Frankfurt, as part of the annual International Motor Show. In preparation of presenting the first driving prototype, the Loremo L1 was equipped with a turbodiesel motor. However, in light of diminishing fossil fuels, an electric motor was expected to be available in the lineup in addition to the originally planned models.

On 21 January 2009 the company announced that the more powerful version Loremo GT would not be equipped with a 3-cylinder diesel engine but with a more powerful (850 cc, 45 KW) petrol engine.

There were no conventional doors on the Loremo automobile. Getting in and out of the car was done by lifting the front portion of the car, including the windscreen, up and forward. The section was hinged at the front of the car where a radiator would normally sit. This method of entry is unconventional, but Loremo AG says that it is convenient.

The project was in prototype stage; specific plans for mass production had not been made public. An area reserved for setting up a factory in Indupark Dorsten-Marl was on offer to other organisations since the start of 2009.

A boardroom shuffle and a lack of partners and capital financing left the project with an uncertain future. A new entry in the company blog was made in August 2010, claiming "promising discussions with a reputable investor from Asia".

According to Car and Driver magazine in August 2010, the Loremo "can't be saved" and "it's over".

== All-electric vehicles ==
The next step in development would have been an electric-powered car.

According to the company, on 11 April 2009 the electrical version Loremo EV drove for the first time on public roads and reached speeds of up to 100 km/h. A film about this drive was published on YouTube.
