= Eco-Runner Team Delft =

Dutch student team

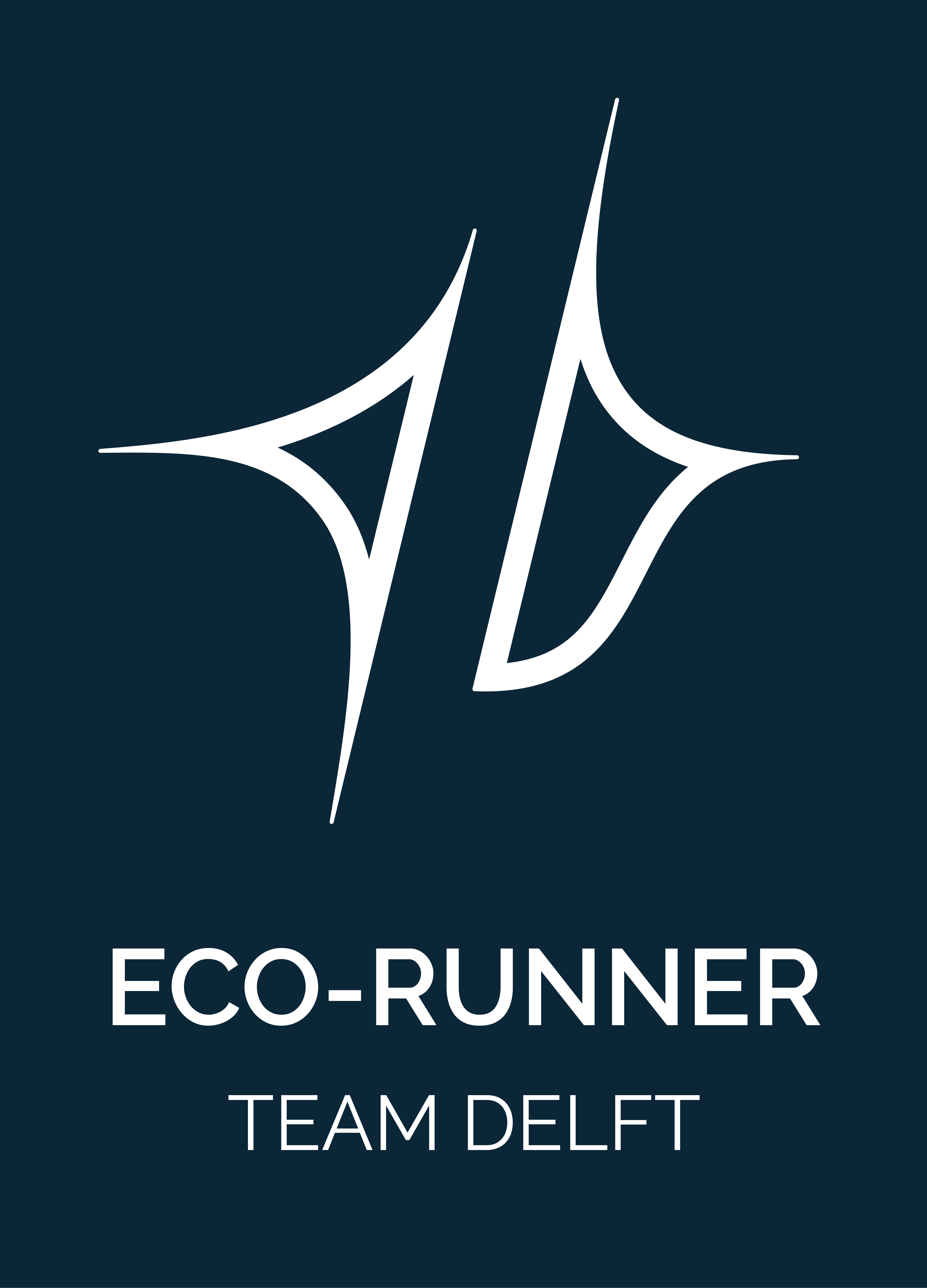
- Founded: November 2005
- Location: Stevinweg 4 2628 CN, Delft, Netherlands
- Awards: Winners Shell Eco-marathon 2015, 2022 & Vehicle Design Award Shell Eco-marathon 2018, 2019, 2020
- Website: www.ecorunner.nl

Eco-Runner Team Delft is a multidisciplinary student team from Delft University of Technology (TU Delft) focused on developing efficient cars powered by sustainable fuels. Every year, a new car is produced to inspire the world towards sustainable mobility.

At the end of each year, the team aims to achieve a specific year goal. These have included competing in the Shell Eco-marathon, a competition the team won in 2015 and 2022. Until 2019, Eco-Runner participated in the Prototype class of the competition but transitioned to the Urban Concept class in 2020.

Other year goals have taken the form of world record attempts, the most recent success being in June 2023. The Eco-Runner XIII set a Guinness World Record by driving 2488.5 km on 950 grams of hydrogen.

In 2024, the team produced a street-legal hydrogen-powered car, making it the first of their vehicles authorized to drive on the public road.

New Mission

Since its founding in 2005, Eco-Runner Team Delft has focused on developing energy-efficient vehicles. For nearly two decades, the team developed hydrogen-powered vehicles, achieving several racing victories and a Guinness World Record.

In 2024, Eco-Runner shifted its focus towards fuel-flexible vehicle technology, exploring the use of different sustainable fuels rather than relying on a single energy source. The initial concept was based on an externally fired gas turbine, which was further developed in 2025.

In 2026, the team began integrating a directly fired micro gas turbine (MGT) into its vehicle. The turbine is designed to operate on multiple sustainable fuels, allowing the vehicle to use different fuel sources. The concept focuses on combining fuel flexibility with energy efficiency, while exploring alternatives to conventional vehicle powertrains.

== Origins & Organization ==
Eco-Runner Team Delft was founded by 11 students (7 from Belgium and 4 from the Netherlands), in the Netherlands in November 2005. They were second-year students of the Faculty of Aerospace Engineering, Delft University of Technology. The team's goal was to compete in the Shell Eco-marathon Prototype class competition on the Rockingham Motor Speedway in the UK in July 2006. The team built the Eco-Runner 1, an efficient petrol vehicle. The result of second project was the Eco-Runner H2, which was the first hydrogen-powered vehicle built by the team. Subsequently, all Eco-Runners from H2 to XIV were hydrogen-powered.

Currently, the team consists of 29 TU Delft students from various faculties. The team consists of both full-timers and part-timers across 5 departments: Management, Operations, Bodywork, Powertrain & Electronics, Vehicle Dynamics and Fuel cell. The team's offices and workshops are located in the D:DREAM Hall on the campus of the Delft University of Technology.

Below is an overview of the different departments and the current (XVII 2026/27) team members is included.

Management	Morris Kusters	Emma Allon	Floor Buurman	Laurens Budding					
Operations	Elvire Meijer	Lieve Schrijver	Lotte Zirkzee	Thijs Zanders	Ton Kannekens	Pepijn van der Horst	Frederique Steltenpool	Raúl Smakman	Vera Geurts
Powertrain & Electronics	Melchior Smits	Femke Peeters	Joost Willemse	Matthias van Ommen	Marili Feilzer	Vincent Rink	Giel van der Velden		
Bodywork	Alexia Bosman	Miquel Caparros	Beatrice Mettes	Stanislaw Rumowski	Nils Koehler				
Vehicle Dynamics	Melle Galama	Antonina Adamowicz							
Fuel Cell	Tjerk van Veldhuizen	Arpeeta Rao							

== Teams across the years ==
=== Eco-Runner 1 ===
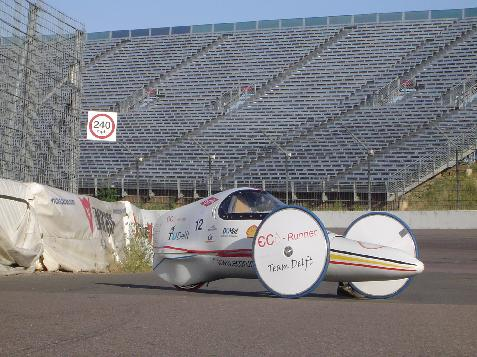
Eco-Runner 1 (2006)

The first Eco-Runner, the Eco-Runner 1, was built with limited time and resources, and it lacked a functional fuel injection system. Despite this, it achieved the team's goal of driving 500 km on 1 liter of petrol. The car performed at 557 kilometers per liter, and this encouraged the team to build a new Eco-Runner and participate again with a new goal: to drive at 2000 kilometers per liter and land a top-5 spot in the Shell Eco-marathon at the Rockingham speedway.

=== Eco-Runner H_{2} ===
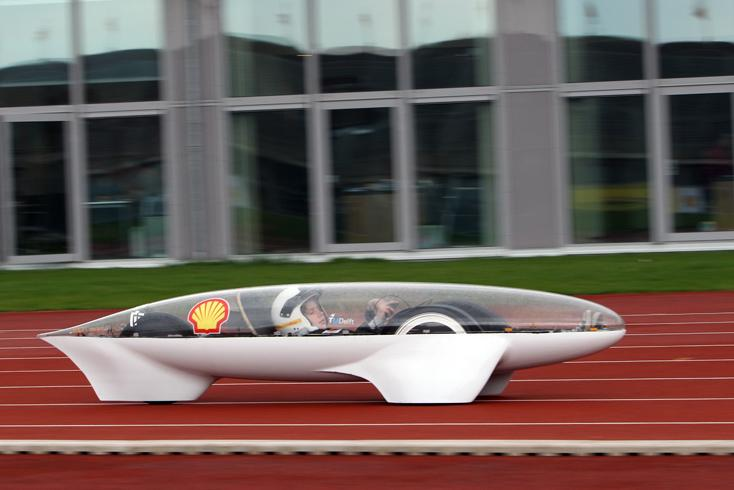
Eco-Runner H2

The second Eco-Runner was named the Eco-Runner H_{2}. Its main improvement with respect to the Eco-Runner 1 was its completely integrated design. This improved the aerodynamic shape and reduced the weight of the vehicle. Furthermore, the team developed two propulsion methods for the Eco-Runner H_{2}, resulting in two physical Eco-Runners H_{2}.

The first propulsion method comprised a fuel cell driving an electric motor. The second propulsion method was a six-stroke petrol combustion engine, which works similarly to a four-stroke engine, with the additional injection of a drop of water after the fourth stroke. The extreme heat remaining in the cylinder head causes the water to expand rapidly, resulting in a "free" working stroke. The disadvantage of this engine was a high level of corrosion, resulting from the combination of water, high temperature and high pressure.

The Eco-Runner H_{2} participated in the 2007 edition of the Shell Eco-Marathon, where it achieved the Dutch fuel efficiency record of 2282 km/L of petrol using the fuel cell set-up (the hydrogen consumption of the fuel cell is monitored carefully by race officials and then converted to the equivalent of a liter of Shell 95 standard fuel using specific combustion heat of both substances). This was despite a hastily repaired and therefore very poorly functioning cruise control system, a feature essential for keeping all of the components working at maximum efficiency.

=== Eco-Runner 3 ===
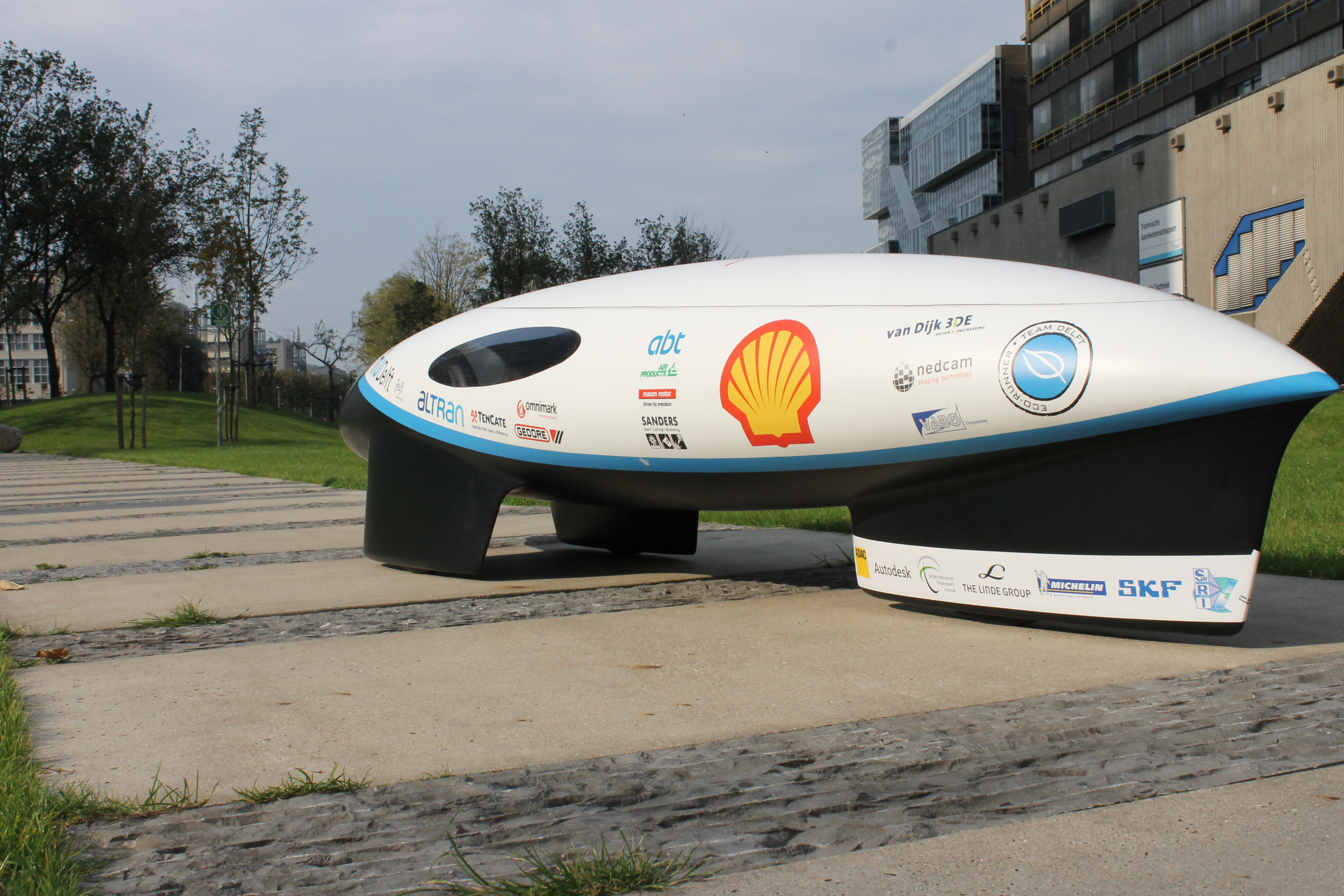
Eco-Runner 3

The third generation of the Eco-Runner participated in the 2011 Shell Eco-Marathon and placed 2nd. Major improvements were achieved regarding, aerodynamics, fuel cell efficiency, and weight reduction. Virtually no components of the Eco-Runner 3 were off-the-shelf: 95% of all components were either designed in-house or modified to suit the team's specific needs.

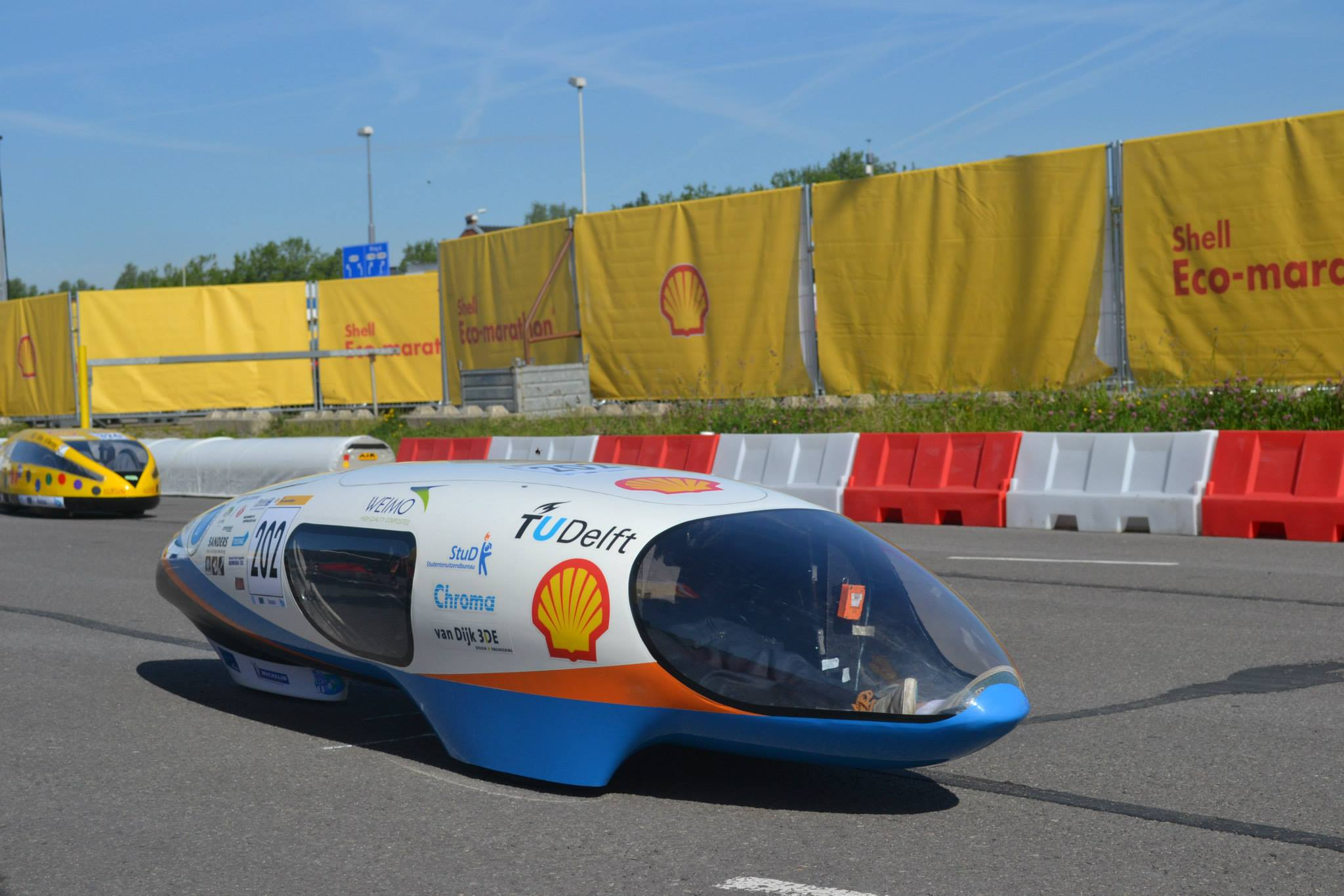
Eco-Runner 4

=== Eco-Runner 4 ===
The fourth generation of the Eco-Runner participated in the 2014 Shell Eco-marathon in Rotterdam and placed 2nd again. This year marked specification changes in the prototype class, it was now a hydrogen class vehicle. A conversion was used from the energy in hydrogen to the equivalent energy in gasoline (liters), which allowed the vehicle to achieve a significant result of 3524 km/L. The weight of the Eco-Runner 4 was around 38 kg and driver's weight was 50 kg. During the race, the average force generated was close to 4 Newtons, and a nominal power of 35 Watts was achieved.

=== Eco-Runner 5 ===
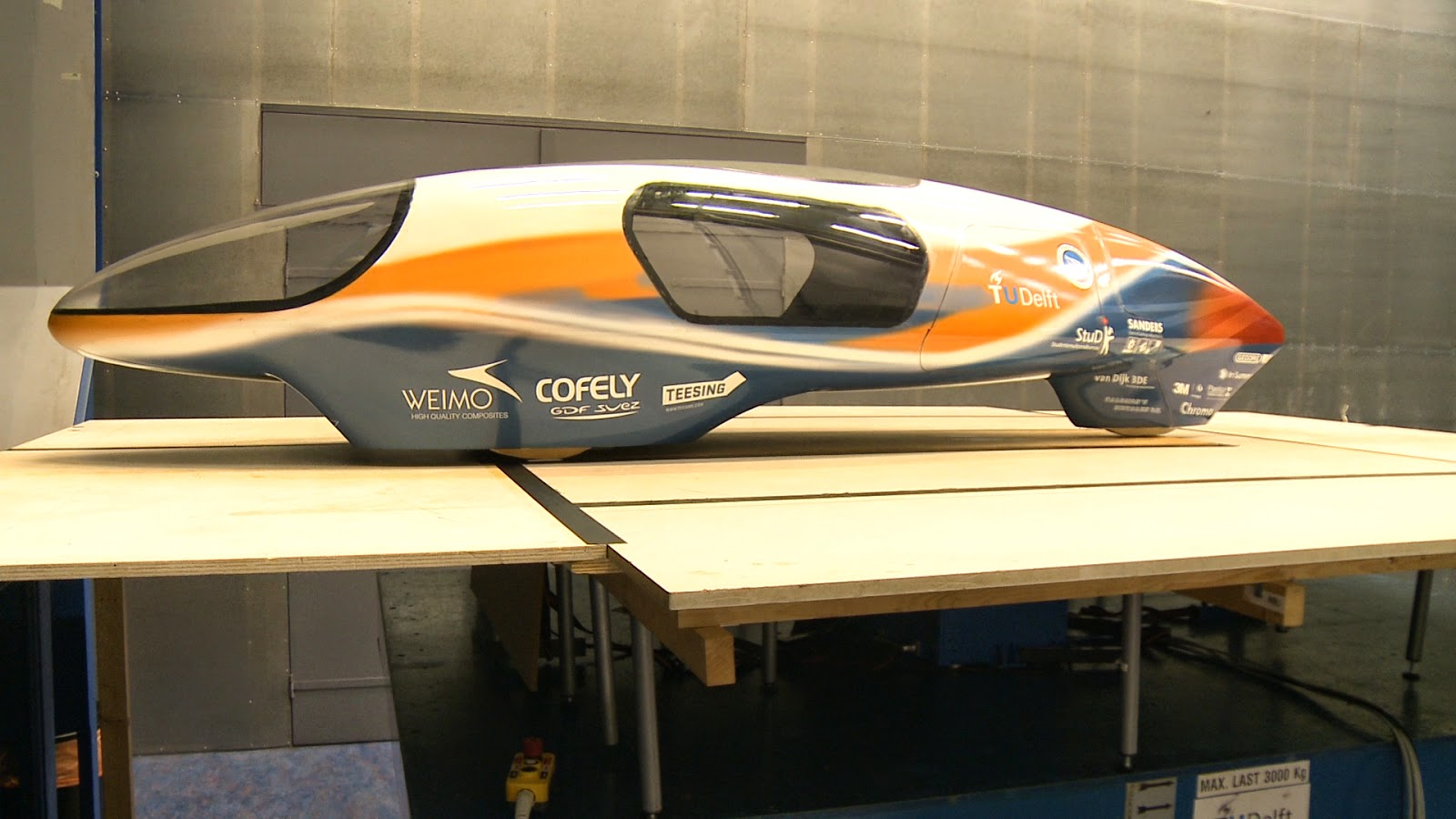
Eco-Runner 5

The fifth generation of the Eco-Runner participated in the 2015 Shell Eco-marathon in Rotterdam and came 1st. The archetype was named as a one-man vehicle powered by hydrogen fuel cell, becoming a category within the hydrogen class vehicle. The major specifications of the Eco-Runner 4 were carried over due to its highly aerodynamic design. Once again, the energy conversion from hydrogen to gasoline (liters) allowed the Eco-Runner 5 to achieve a significant result of 3653 km/L. Furthermore, the use of front wheel steering mechanism enabled the vehicle to achieve a turning radius of just 8 meters.

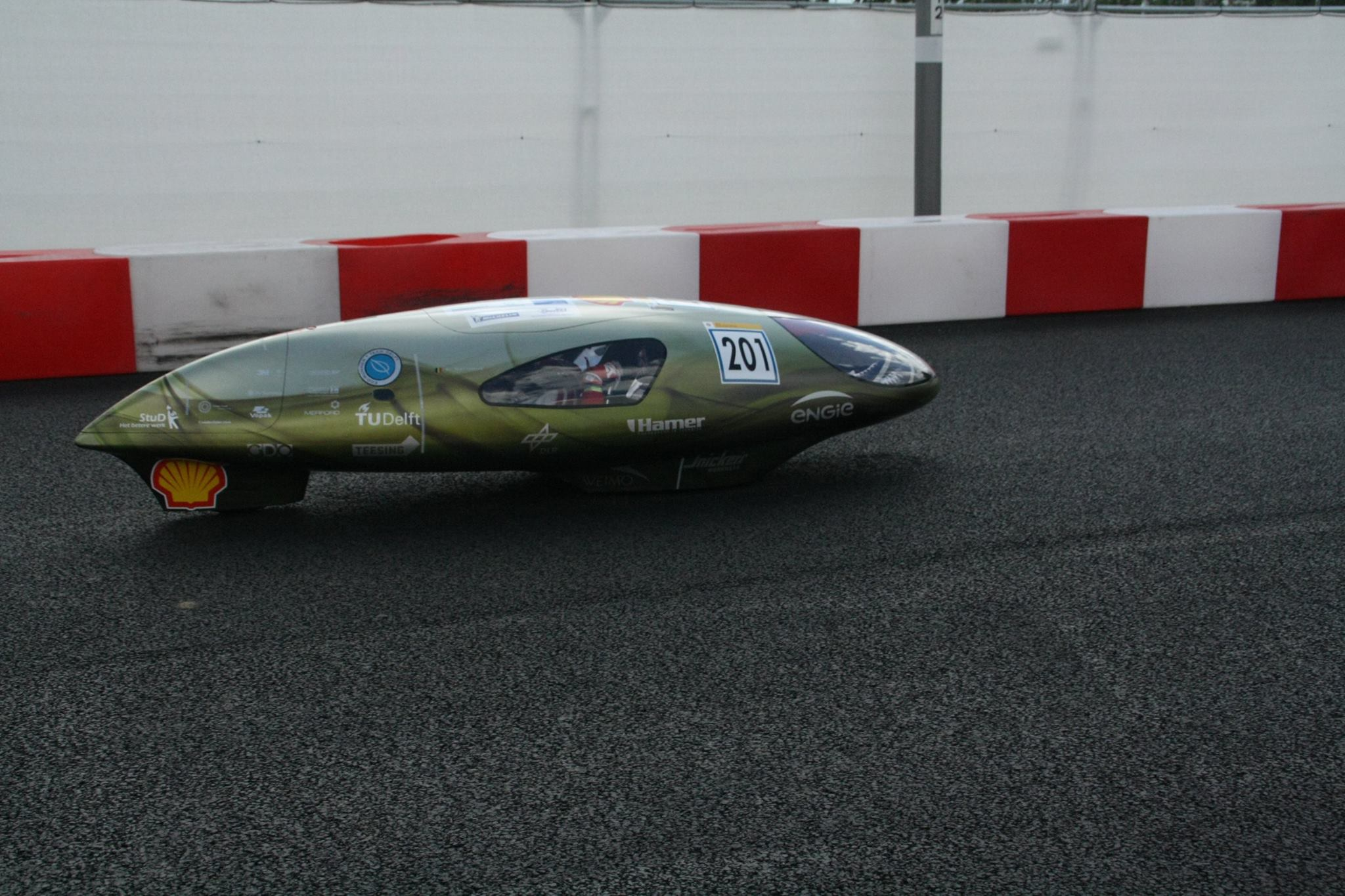
Eco-Runner 6

=== Eco-Runner 6 ===
The Eco-Runner 6 participated in the 2016 Shell Eco-Marathon in London. It's aerodynamic shape was designed in such a way that extensive computational fluid dynamic analysis could be carried out for racing conditions. The application of zigzag strips was used to delay flow separation, which ultimately improved race performance. The combination of supercapacitors acted as a buffer between the fuel cell and the motor, while also providing the necessary support for the inclines on London tracks. This setup allowed for the rapid distribution of power to the motor, enabling the fuel cell to operate at its optimal efficiency continuously.

=== Eco-Runner 7 ===
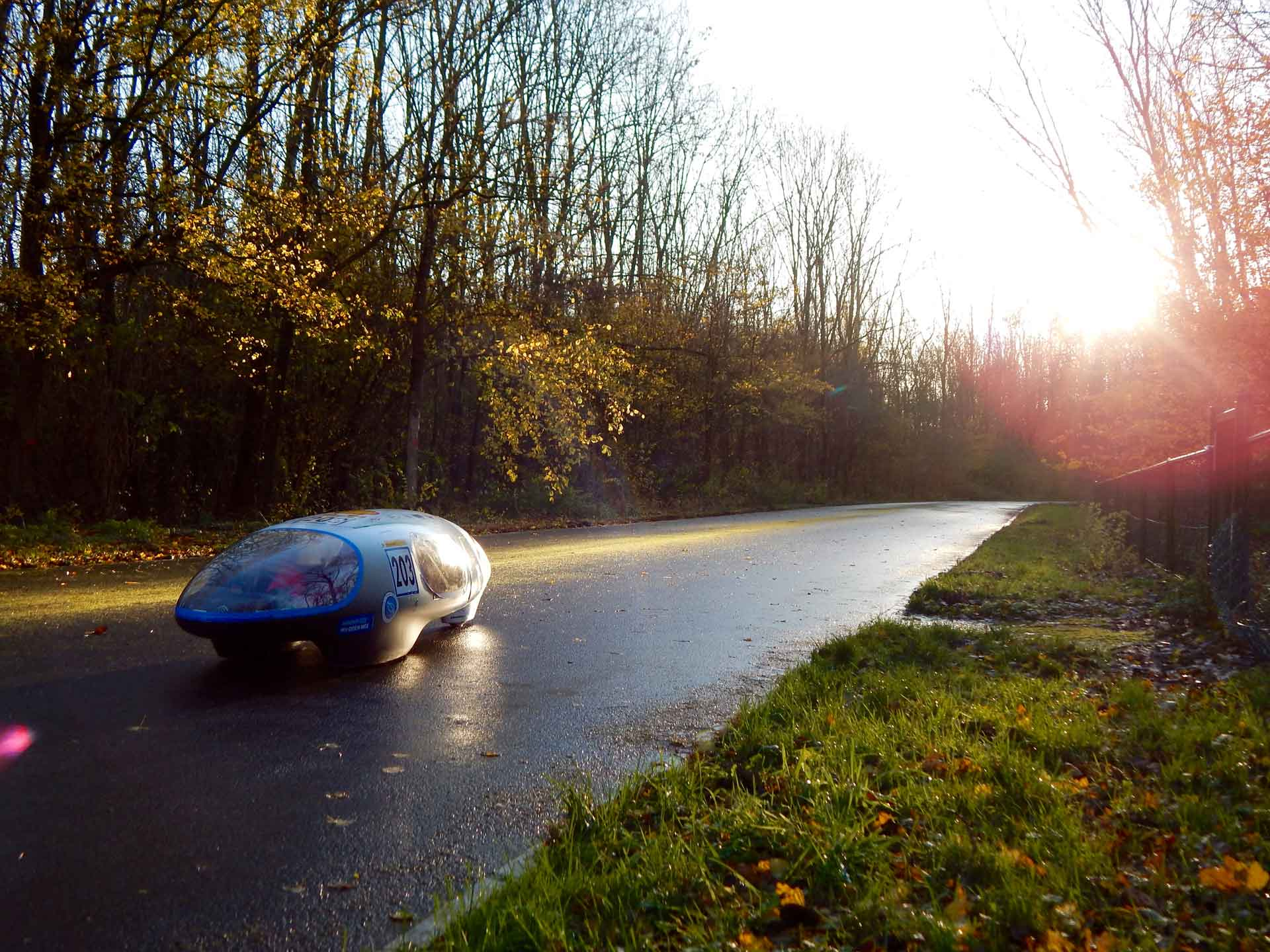
Eco-Runner 7

The Eco-Runner 7 was built in 9 months to participate at the 2017 Shell Eco-marathon in London. The track in London, as mentioned, is very dynamic, consisting of a hill and sharp corners, making it challenging to drive efficiently. The Eco-Runner 7 is subsequently custom-made for the track in London, a new concept for the entire powertrain system had to be designed. The powertrain system had been altered by implementing an external electric motor which is connected to the wheel with a chain transmission. In addition, the fuel cell was improved by reducing its weight and increasing its efficiency. During the competition, the team experienced significant technical setbacks which resulted in no attempts being able to be set.

=== Eco-Runner 8 ===
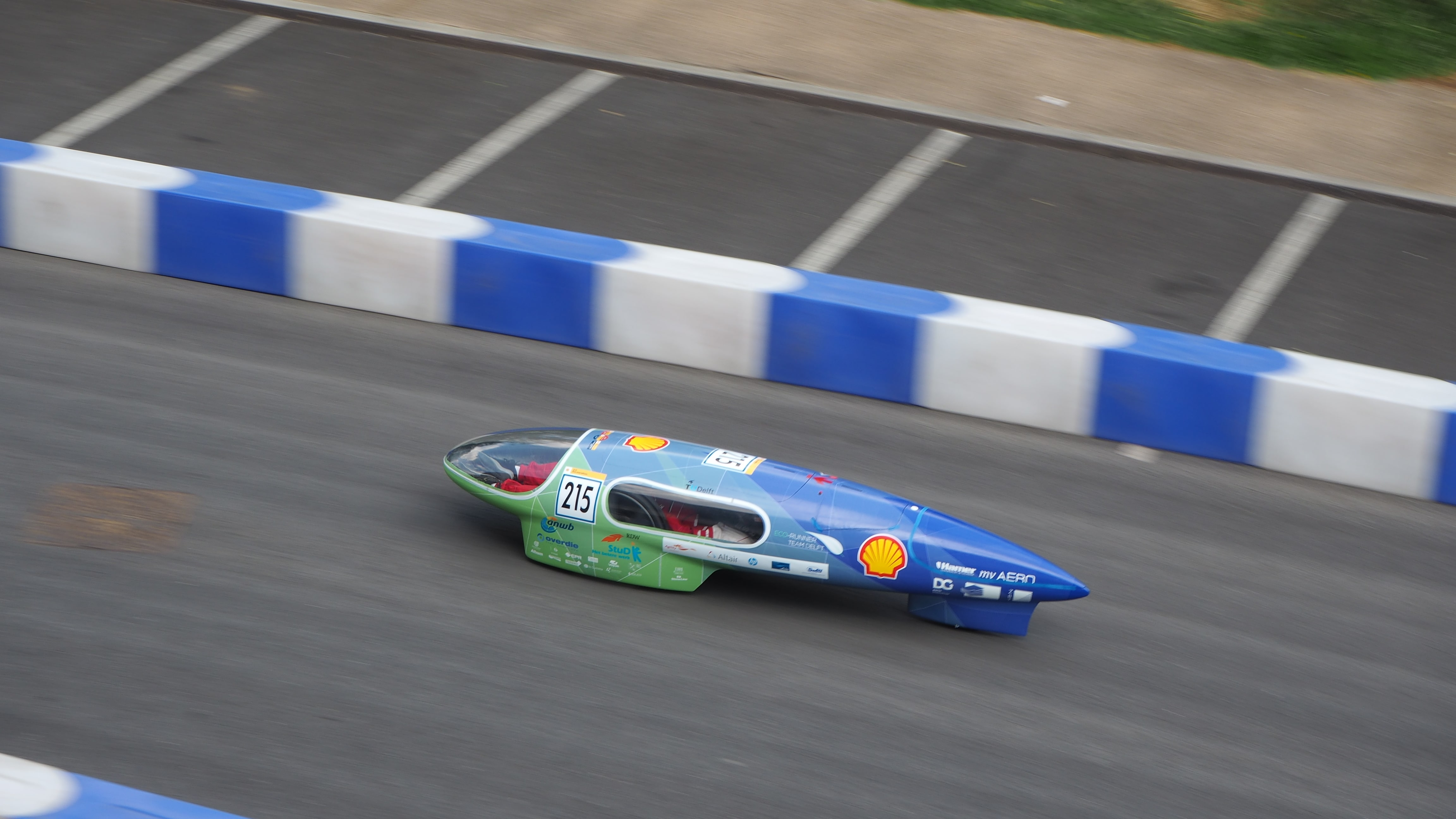
Eco-Runner 8

Eco-Runner 8 placed 3rd in the Shell Eco-marathon, which took place in London. The team also won the “Vehicle Design” prototype award, partially due to its impressive “neural network” which allowed them to effectively communicate with the driver. The hull of the Eco-Runner 8 was designed by means of wind tunnel tests. The vehicle had the electromotor placed in front of the rear wheel so that the vehicle was powered by means of a chain transmission. However, this chain resulted in significant energy losses during the race, prompting the next team to implement an in-wheel motor.

=== Eco-Runner 9 ===
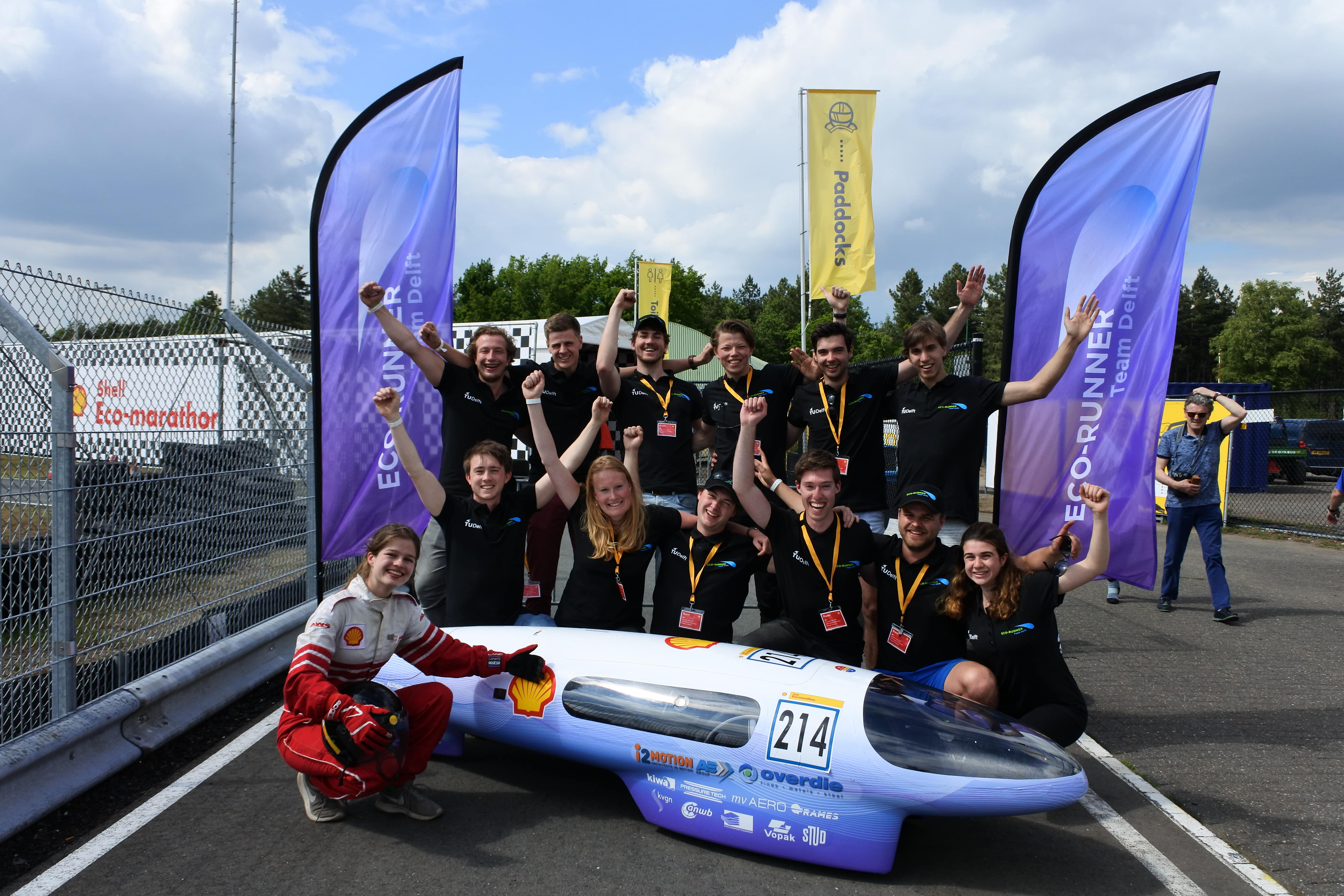
Eco-Runner 9

In comparison to its predecessors, the Eco-Runner 9 reached a milestone in innovation. The team improved the in-depth neural network to provide the driver with real-time information to optimize the race strategy, made changes to the composite thickness enhancing weight reduction, and placed an in-wheel motor to increase efficiency by changing from chain transmission to a direct transmission. The vehicle weighed only 42 kg, a 19% weight reduction compared to the Eco-Runner 8, and was able to claim third place in the Shell Eco-marathon Europe. Additionally, they again received the Vehicle Design Award.

=== Eco-Runner X ===
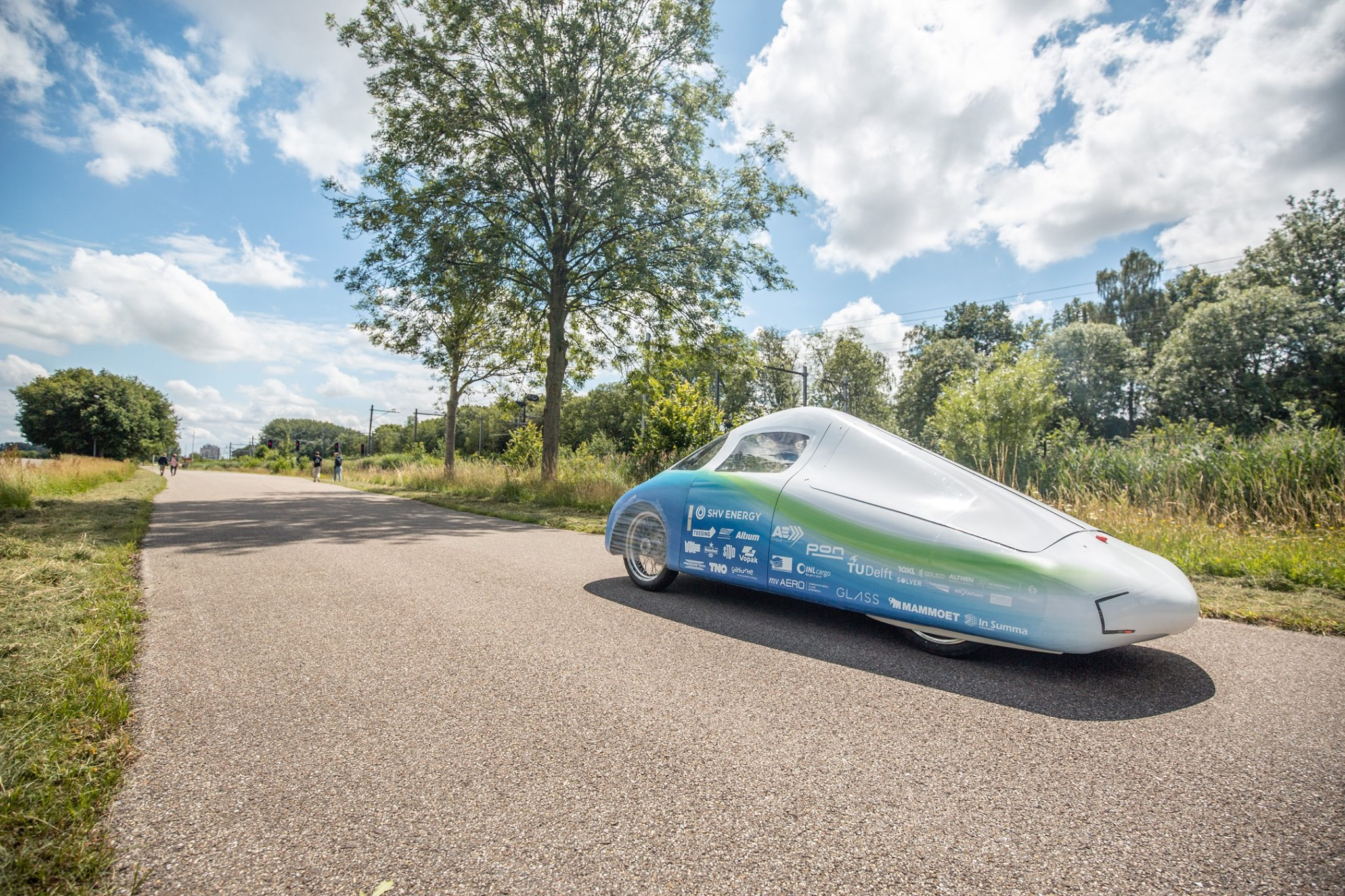
Eco-Runner X

The Eco-Runner X was the first to participate in the Urban Concept class of the Shell Eco-marathon. For this a completely new design was developed, including headlights, windshield wipers and a luggage compartment, approaching the design of a city car. With this new design the Eco-Runner X team once again won the Vehicle Design Award of the Shell Eco-marathon Off-track competition. The On-Track competitions of the Shell Eco-marathon were cancelled due to COVID-19, so the team organized their own on-track competition with HAN Hydromotive and won this race with an efficiency of 2500 km/L hydrogen.

=== Eco-Runner XI ===
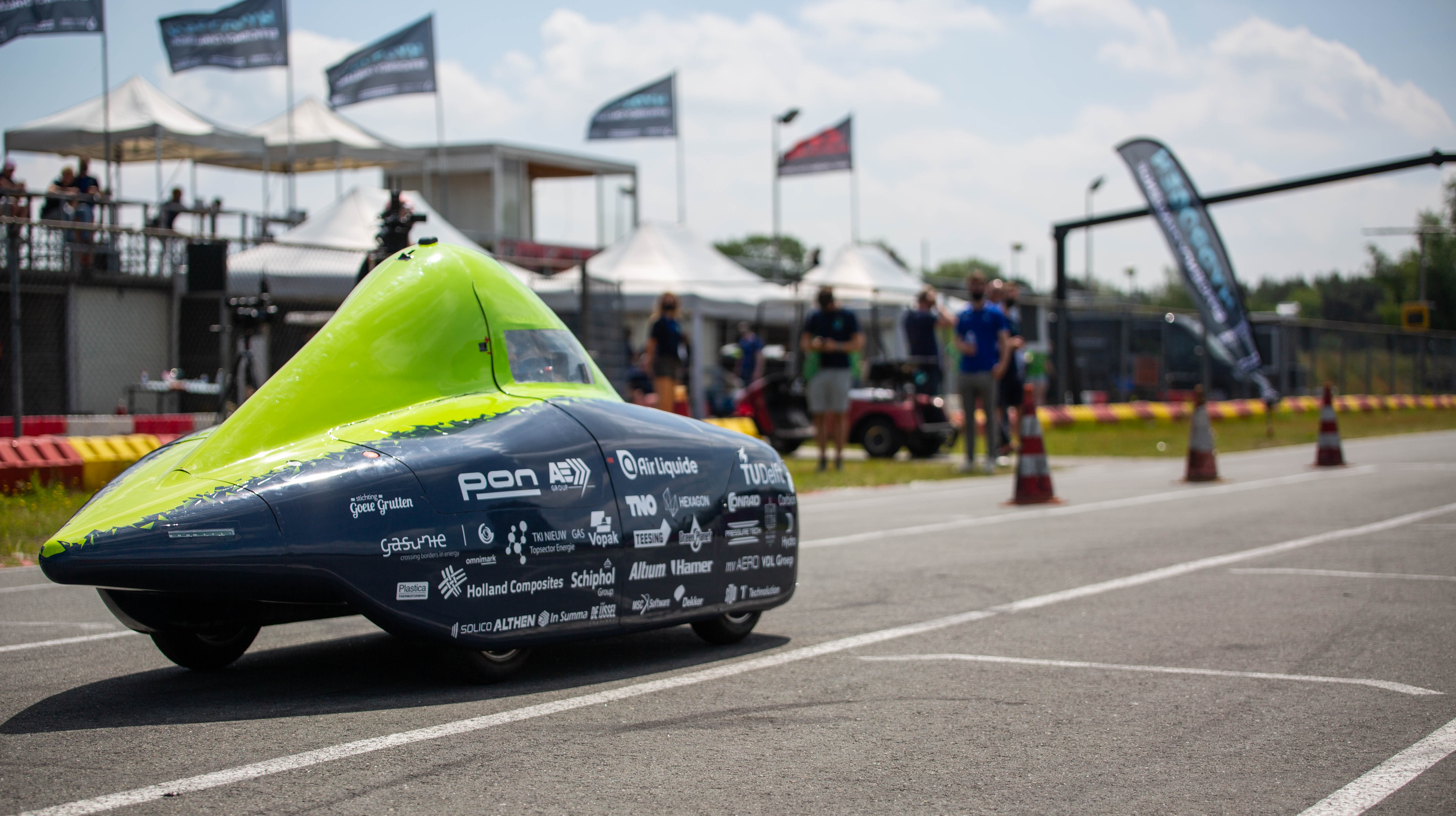
Eco-Runner XI

The Eco-Runner XI was the second iteration to participate in the Urban Concept class of the Shell Eco-marathon. A teardrop profile of the body accompanied with continuous wheel caps and a curved bottom plane minimised the turbulence and maximised performance. This resulted in an overall decrease of 48% in aerodynamic drag compared to the previous car. A smart cruise control system was implemented with newly designed aluminium rims and an in-wheel motor, improving overall efficiency to 3396 km/kg hydrogen. The car won the Hydrogen Efficiency Challenge, a competition organized by the team itself in collaboration with HAN Hydromotive and Green Team Twente, because the On-track competition had once again been cancelled. Additionally, the Eco-Runner XI broke the world record for longest distance travelled in a hydrogen vehicle by driving non-stop for 36 hours on one tank (450 gr) of hydrogen, reaching a record distance of 1195.74 km.

=== Eco-Runner XII ===
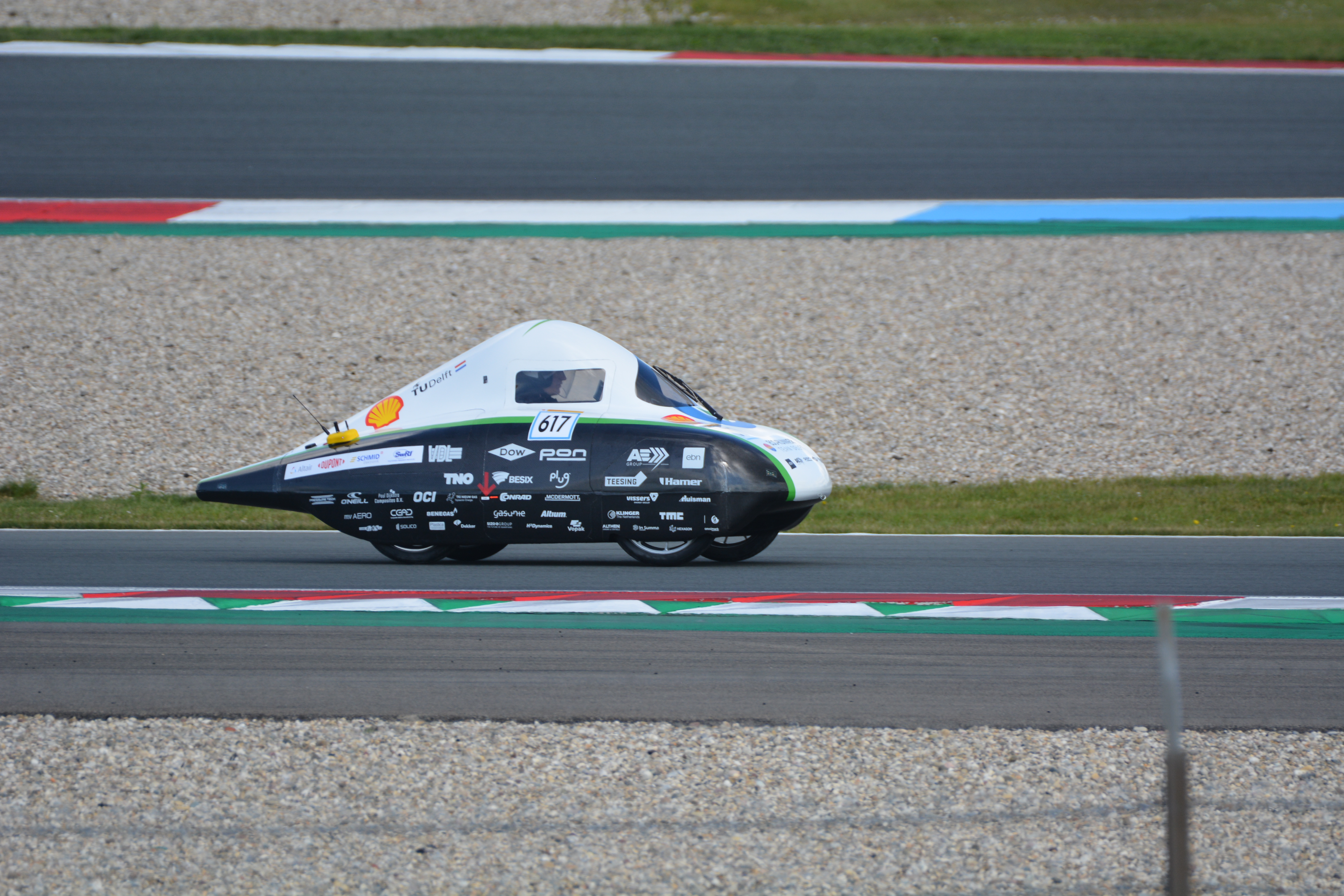
Eco-Runner XII

The Eco-Runner XII was the third Urban Concept car of Eco-Runner Team Delft, but the first to participate in this class at the on-track competition of the Shell Eco-marathon in 2022 at TT Circuit Assen. It finished in 1st place, performing with an efficiency of 468 km/m^3, equivalent to 5407 km/kg. That year, the team had improved various aspects of the car design, including an optimized race strategy, a new fuel cell, an in-wheel electric motor, and significant weight reduction. Specifically, 41% weight reduction was achieved with various strategies. These included making the entire body of the car load-carrying, similar to the concept of a Formula 1 car, and replacing many aluminum parts with carbon fiber, a significantly lighter material.

=== Eco-Runner XIII ===
The Eco-Runner XIII was the fourth Urban Concept car of Eco-Runner Team Delft, and set a new Guinness World Record by driving 2488.5 km on 950 grams of hydrogen.

=== Eco-Runner XIV ===
The Eco-Runner XIV was designed, for the first time, to be a street legal hydrogen car, so the car had more than 1300 new regulations to adhere to, some of which were formulated with the help of the RDW. The vehicle class of the car was L7EA2, and it drove 2056 km on 1.45 kg of hydrogen for 3 days, following the route of an annual Dutch ice-skating route: the Eflstedentocht.

Eco-Runner XV

Eco-Runner XVI

Eco-Runner XVII

== Shell Eco-marathon results ==
=== Prototype class results ===
The results of the Shell Eco-marathon Prototype class competition are obtained by measuring the amount of hydrogen used per km and converting it to petrol (liters).

Vehicle	Year	Location	Efficiency (km/L)	Position
Eco-Runner 1	2005	Rockingham, England	557 km/L	Top 5
Eco-Runner H_{2}	2007	Nogaro, France	2282 km/L	N.A.
Eco-Runner 3	2011	Rotterdam, Netherlands	2914 km/L	2nd
Eco-Runner 4	2014	Rotterdam, Netherlands	3524 km/L	2nd
Eco-Runner 5	2015	Rotterdam, Netherlands	3653 km/L	1st
Eco-Runner 6	2016	London, United Kingdom	1992 km/L	3rd
Eco-Runner 7	2017	London, United Kingdom	-	D.N.F.
Eco-Runner 8	2018	London, United Kingdom	2028 km/L	3rd
Eco-Runner 9	2019	London, United Kingdom	1987 km/L	3rd

=== Urban Concept class results ===
The results of the Urban Concept class are presented in the following table.

Vehicle	Year	Location	Efficiency (km/kg)	Position
Eco-Runner X	2020	London, United Kingdom	2500 km/kg	1st*
Eco-Runner XI	2021	London, United Kingdom	3396 km/kg	1st**
Eco-Runner XII	2022	TT Circuit Assen, Netherlands	5407 km/kg	1st

*There was no on-track SEM competition due to COVID-19. 1st in the off-track Vehicle Design Awards and at on-track competition against HAN Hydromotive.

**There was no on-track SEM competition due to COVID-19. 1st in the Hydrogen Efficiency Challenge, an on-track competition against Green Team Twente & HAN Hydromotive.
