= Automobile drag coefficient =

Resistance of a car to moving through air

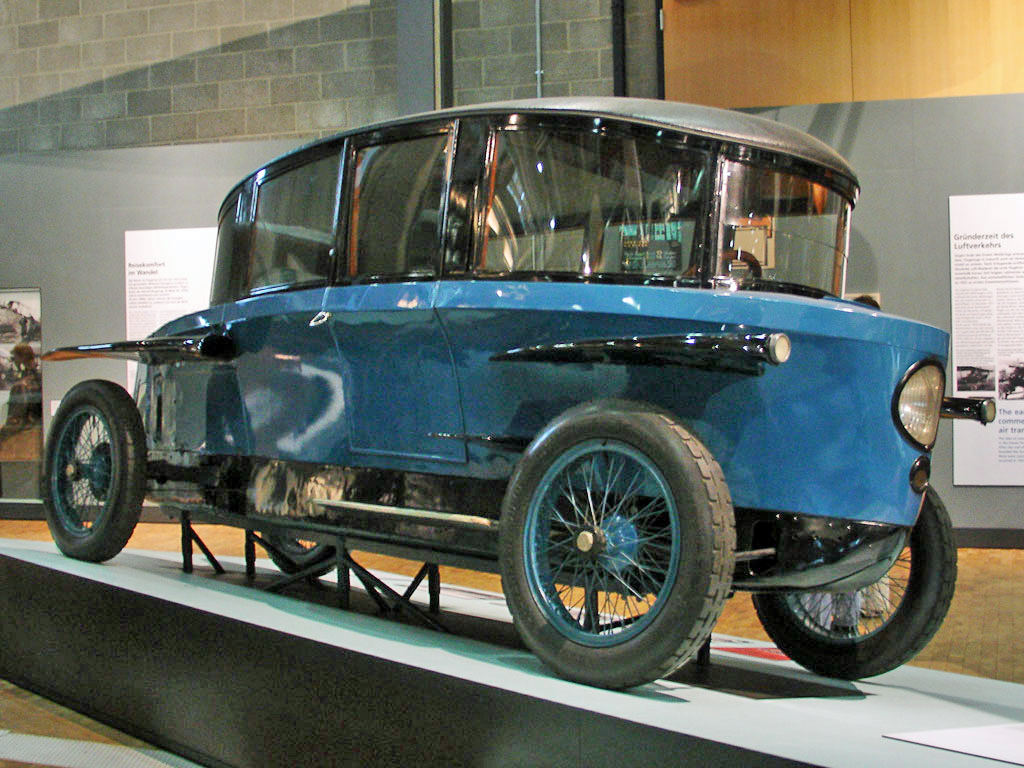
Edmund Rumpler's 1921 Tropfenwagen was the first series-produced aerodynamically designed automobile, before the Chrysler Airflow and the Tatra 77.

The drag coefficient is a common measure in automotive design as it pertains to aerodynamics. Drag is a force that acts parallel to and in the same direction as the airflow. The drag coefficient of an automobile measures the way the automobile passes through the surrounding air. When automobile companies design a new vehicle they take into consideration the automobile drag coefficient in addition to the other performance characteristics. Aerodynamic drag increases with the square of speed; therefore it becomes critically important at higher speeds. Reducing the drag coefficient in an automobile improves the performance of the vehicle as it pertains to speed and fuel efficiency. There are many different ways to reduce the drag of a vehicle. A common way to measure the drag of the vehicle is through the drag area.

== The importance of drag reduction ==
The reduction of drag in road vehicles has led to increases in the top speed of the vehicle and the vehicle's fuel efficiency, as well as many other performance characteristics, such as handling and acceleration. The two main factors that impact drag are the frontal area of the vehicle and the drag coefficient. The drag coefficient is a unit-less value that denotes how much an object resists movement through a fluid such as water or air. A potential complication of altering a vehicle's aerodynamics is that it may cause the vehicle to get too much lift. Lift is an aerodynamic force that acts perpendicular to the airflow around the body of the vehicle. Too much lift can cause the vehicle to lose road traction which can be very unsafe. Lowering the drag coefficient comes from streamlining the exterior body of the vehicle. Streamlining the body requires assumptions about the surrounding airspeed and characteristic use of the vehicle.

Cars that try to reduce drag employ devices such as spoilers, wings, diffusers, and fins to reduce drag and increase speed in one direction.

== Drag area ==
While designers pay attention to the overall shape of the automobile, they also bear in mind that reducing the frontal area of the shape helps reduce the drag. The product of drag coefficient and area – drag area – is represented as CdA (or C_{x}A), a multiplication of Cd value by area.

The term drag area derives from aerodynamics, where it is the product of some reference area (such as cross-sectional area, total surface area, or similar) and the drag coefficient. In 2003, Car and Driver magazine adopted this metric as a more intuitive way to compare the aerodynamic efficiency of various automobiles.

The force F required to overcome drag is calculated with the drag equation: $F = \tfrac{1}{2} \times \text{air density} \times \text{drag coefficient} \times \text{reference area} \times \text{speed}^2$ Therefore:$F = \tfrac{1}{2} \times \text{air density} \times \mathbf{\text{drag area} } \times \text{speed}^2$ Where the drag coefficient and reference area have been collapsed into the drag area term. This allows direct estimation of the drag force at a given speed for any vehicle for which only the drag area is known and therefore easier comparison. As drag area CdA is the fundamental value that determines power required for a given cruise speed it is a critical parameter for fuel consumption at a steady speed. This relation also allows an estimation of the new top speed of a car with a tuned engine:

$$\text{estimated top speed} = \text{original top speed} \times \sqrt[3]{\frac{\text{new power}}\text{original power}}$$

Or the power required for a target top speed:

$$\text{power required} = \text{original power} \times \left( \frac{\text{target speed}}{\text{original speed}} \right)^3$$

Average full-size passenger cars have a drag area of roughly 8 sq ft (0.74 m^{2}). Reported drag areas range from the 1999 Honda Insight at 5.1 sq ft (0.47 m^{2}) to the 2003 Hummer H2 at 26.5 sq ft (2.46 m^{2}). The drag area of a bicycle (and rider) is also in the range of 6.5–7.5 sq ft (0.60–0.70 m^{2}).

== Example drag coefficients ==
The average modern automobile achieves a drag coefficient of between 0.25 and 0.3. Sport utility vehicles (SUVs), with their typically boxy shapes, typically achieve a Cd=0.35–0.45. The drag coefficient of a vehicle is affected by the shape of body of the vehicle. Various other characteristics affect the coefficient of drag as well, and are taken into account in these examples. Many sports cars have a surprisingly high drag coefficient, as downforce implies drag, while others are designed to be highly aerodynamic in pursuit of a speed and efficiency, and as a result have much lower drag coefficients.

Note that the Cd of a given vehicle will vary depending on which wind tunnel it is measured in. Variations of up to 5% have been documented and variations in test technique and analysis can also make a difference. So if the same vehicle with a drag coefficient of Cd=0.30 was measured in a different tunnel it could be anywhere from Cd=0.285 to Cd=0.315.

Production vehicles
Calendar year	Automobile	Cd
1938	Volkswagen Beetle	0.48
2018	Jeep Wrangler (JL)	0.454
2012	Pagani Huayra	0.31
2019	Toyota Corolla (E210, UK)	0.31
2001	Toyota Prius	0.29
2005	Chevrolet Corvette C6	0.286
2019	Porsche Taycan Turbo	0.22 (Note: in Range mode in combination with a low level and closed air intake flaps)
2023	Tesla Model 3	0.219
2023	Hyundai Ioniq 6	0.21
2016	Tesla Model S	0.208
2021	Mercedes-Benz EQS	0.20 (Note: w/ 19-inch AMG wheel/tire combination in "Sport" driving mode)
2022	Lucid Air	0.197 (Note: w/ 19-inch wheel/tire combination)
2024	Xiaomi SU7	0.195
1996	General Motors EV1	0.19

Concept and experimental vehicles
Calendar year	Automobile	Cd
1952	Alfa Romeo Disco Volante	0.26
1933	Dymaxion Car	0.25
1954	Alfa Romeo B.A.T. 7 Concept	0.19
2021	Aptera SEV (2019 relaunch)	0.13
2000	General Motors Precept Concept	0.16
2022	Mercedes-Benz Vision EQXX	0.170
2013	Volkswagen XL1	0.19
2018	Ecorunner 8 (Shell Eco-marathon) Prototype	0.045
2022	Sunswift 7	0.095

Automobile examples of CdA
CdA sqft	CdA m2	Year	Automobile model
3.00 sq ft	0.279 m^{2}	2011	Volkswagen XL1
3.95 sq ft	0.367 m^{2}	1996	GM EV1
5.52 sq ft	0.513 m^{2}	2019	Porsche Taycan Turbo
6.0 sq ft	0.56 m^{2}	2001	Honda Insight
6.05 sq ft	0.562 m^{2}	2012	Tesla Model S P85
6.20 sq ft	0.576 m^{2}	2014	Toyota Prius
8.79 sq ft	0.817 m^{2}	1956	Citroën DS Spécial
13.0 sq ft	1.21 m^{2}	2019	Ram 1500
17 sq ft	1.6 m^{2}	2013	Mercedes-Benz G-Class

Concept/experimental cars
CdA sqft	CdA m2	Automobile model
0.21 sq ft	0.020 m^{2}	Pac-car II
2.04 sq ft	0.190 m^{2}	2011 Aptera 2 Series

== See also ==
- Automotive aerodynamics
- Drag (physics)
- Drag equation
- Paul Jaray
