= ET7 =

ET7 may refer to:

- Nio ET7, car model
- China Railways ET7, steam locomotive
- Ella Toone (born 1999), English footballer with brand name ET7
