= Nio ES7 =

Battery electric mid-size luxury crossover SUV

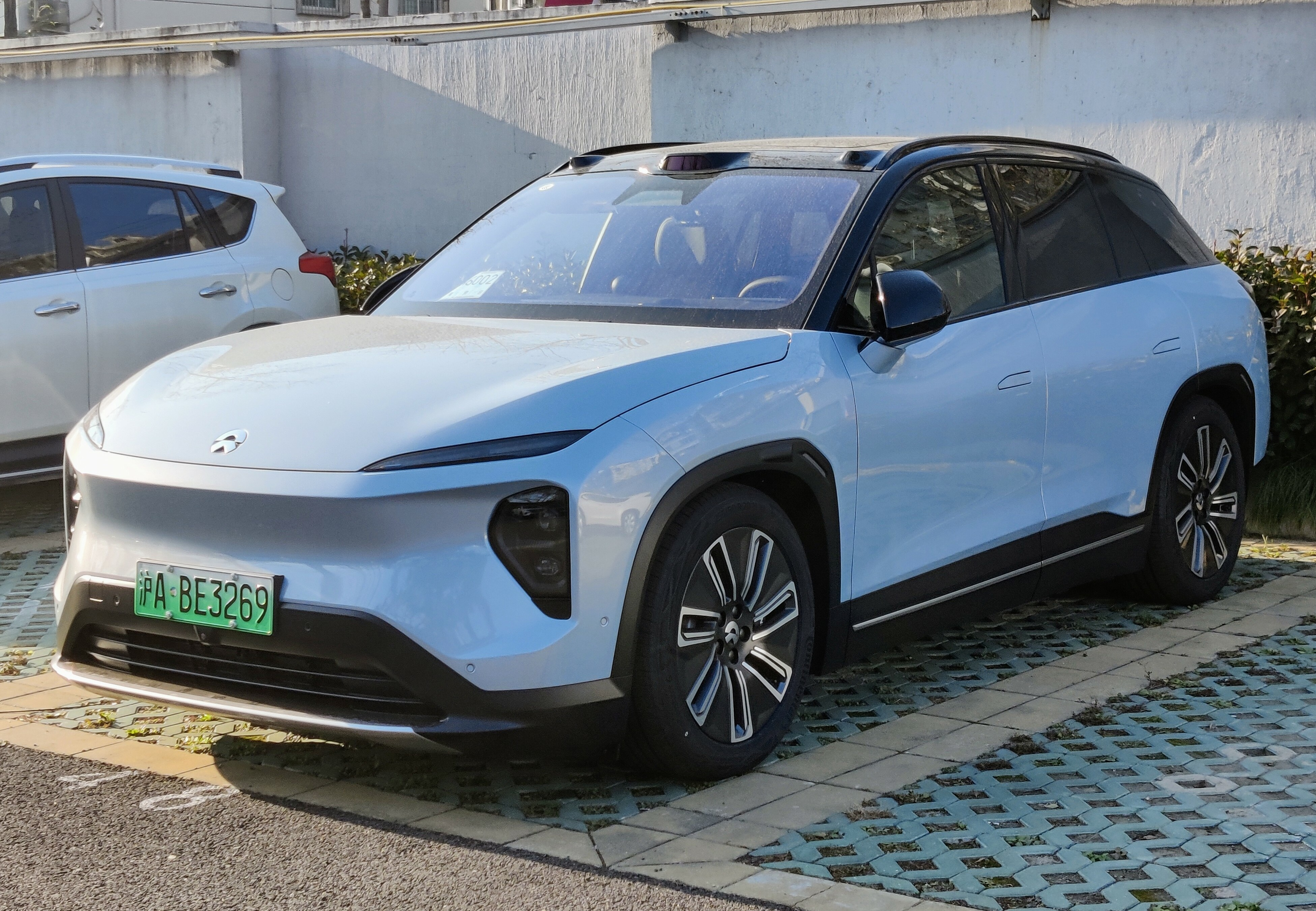

Overview
- Manufacturer: Nio Inc.
- Also called: Nio EL7 (Europe)
- Production: 2022–2025 (China); 2022–present (export)
- Assembly: China: Hefei, Anhui

Body and chassis
- Class: Mid-size luxury crossover SUV
- Body style: 5-door SUV
- Layout: Dual motor 4WD
- Related: Nio EC7

Powertrain
- Electric motor: AC induction/asynchronous, Permanent magnet motor
- Transmission: 1-speed direct-drive reduction
- Battery: 75 kWh Li-ion Battery; 100 kWh Li-ion Battery; 150 kWh Li-ion Battery

Dimensions
- Wheelbase: 2,972 mm (117 in)
- Length: 4,903 mm (193 in)
- Width: 1,982 mm (78 in)
- Height: 1,730 mm (68 in)
- Curb weight: 2,381 kg (5,249 lb)

The Nio ES7 is a battery electric mid-size luxury crossover SUV manufactured by Chinese electric car company Nio. The ES7 was announced online in June 2022, and is the first to use Nio's NT 2.0 Platform. It was put into production in 2022 for the Chinese and European market.

== Overview ==
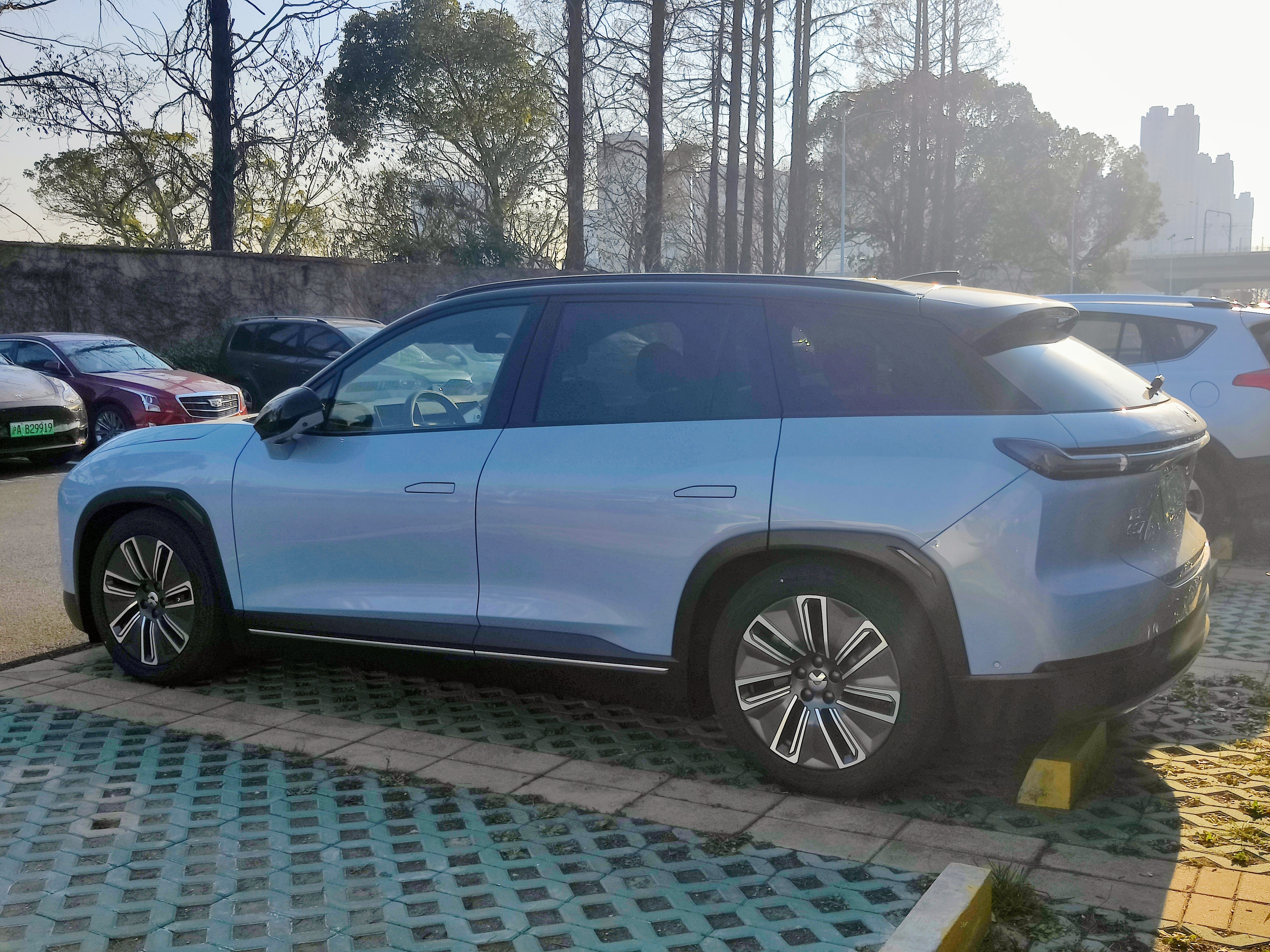
Rear view

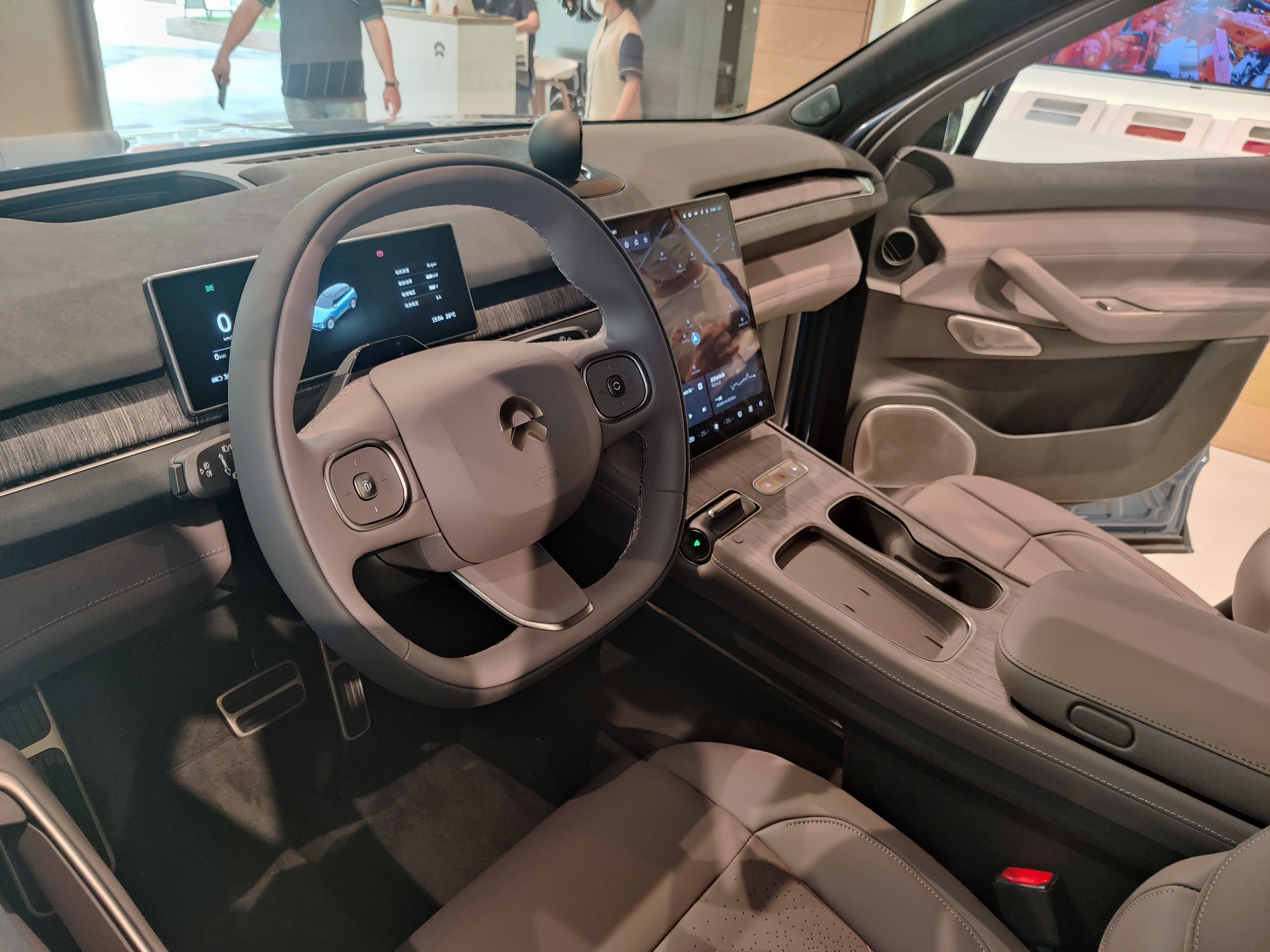
Interior

The ES7 is a 5-seater mid-size crossover SUV, with a wheelbase of 2,960 mm (117 in) and a body length of 4,912 mm (193.4 in). The body and chassis are completely aluminum, and the drivetrain is all-wheel drive standard, and features active air suspension as standard across all models. Its drag coefficient is as low as 0.263.

== Specifications ==
The Nio ES7 is equipped with both permanent magnet and induction motors. With a dual-motor four-wheel drive system with the front motor offering a peak output of 180 kW (241 hp; 245 PS) and the rear motor offering a peak output of 300 kW (402 hp; 408 PS), the Nio ES7 accelerates from 0 to 100 km/h (62 mph) in 3.9 seconds and 100 km/h (62 mph) to 0 braking is within 33.9 metres (111 ft). The ES7 is powered by a lithium-ion battery pack compatible with Nio's battery swap stations just like the Nio ES8. The range of the car with the 75 kWh Standard Range Battery is 485 km (301 mi), while the models equipped with the 150 kWh Ultra-long Range Battery has a range of 930 km (578 mi) on the CLTC cycle.

the ES7 is one of the first certified passenger vehicles in China with the ability to tow a caravan or a trailer with a license. The electric tow bar is an optional add-on for the ES7 and has a maximum towing capacity of 2,000 kg (4,410 lb). The ES7 can also support vehicle to load (V2L) discharging and “Camping Mode” to power outside devices.

The price of the ES7 ranges from ¥468,000 ($69,300 | €67,850) to ¥548,000 ($81,100 | €79,450)

== Safety ==
Euro NCAP test results Nio EL7 20" rim 75kWh Battery (LHD) (2023)
Test	Points	%
Overall:	5 /5 stars	
Adult occupant:	37.3	93%
Child occupant:	42	85%
Pedestrian:	50.8	80%
Safety assist:	14.2	79%

== Sales ==
Year	China
2022	14,158
2023	6,524
2024	1,874
2025	345
