= Nio EC7 =

Battery electric mid-size luxury crossover SUV

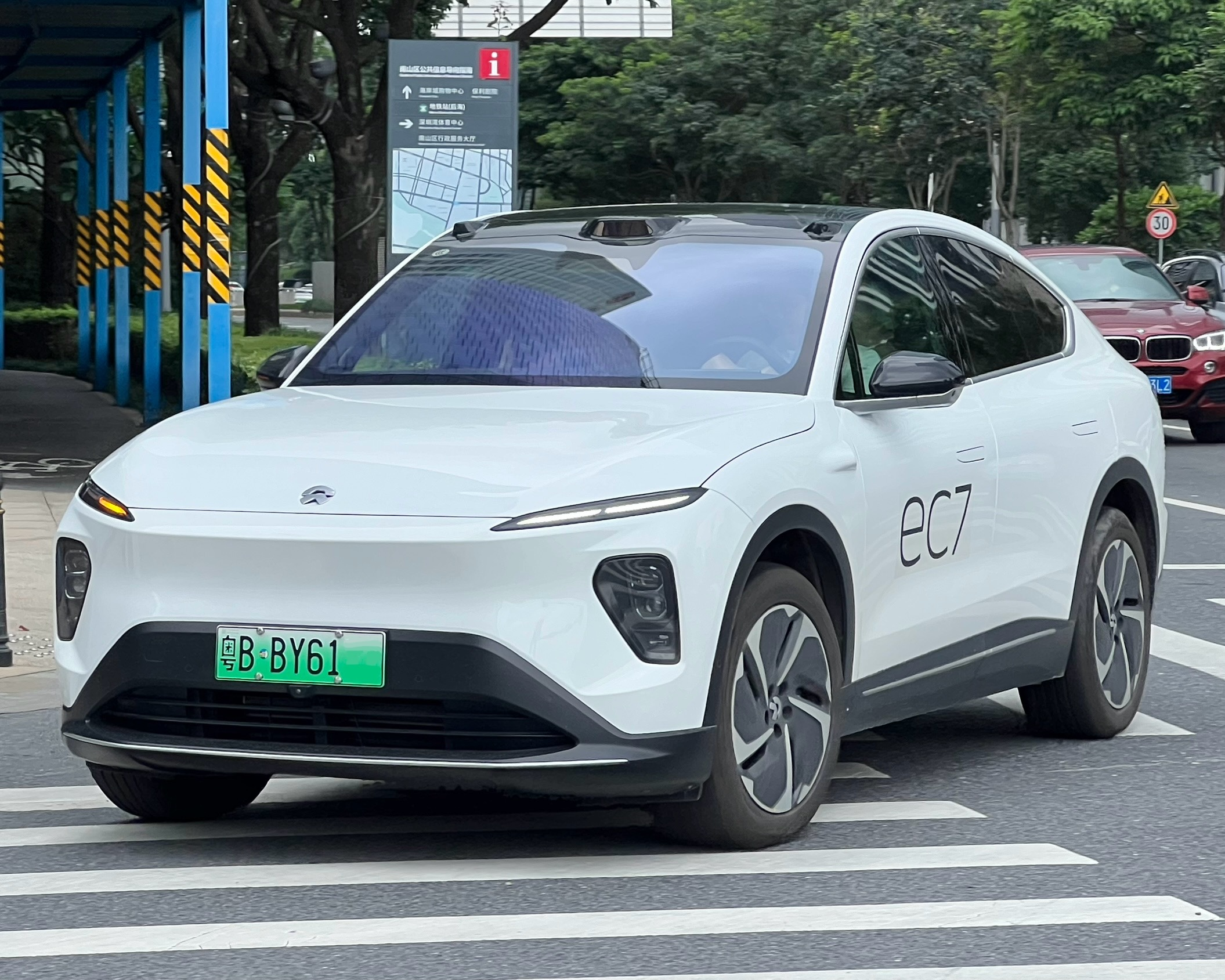

Overview
- Manufacturer: Nio Inc.
- Production: 2023–present
- Assembly: China: Hefei, Anhui

Body and chassis
- Class: Mid-size luxury crossover SUV
- Body style: 5-door coupe SUV
- Layout: Dual motor 4WD
- Related: Nio ES7

Powertrain
- Electric motor: AC induction/asynchronous, permanent magnet motor
- Transmission: 1-speed direct-drive reduction
- Battery: 150 kWh Li-ion; 100 kWh Li-ion; 75 kWh Li-ion
- Electric range: 75 kWh: 490km; 100 kWh: 635km; 150 kWh: 940km (NEDC)

Dimensions
- Wheelbase: 2,960 mm (116.5 in)
- Length: 4,968 mm (195.6 in)
- Width: 1,974 mm (77.7 in)
- Height: 1,714 mm (67.5 in)

The Nio EC7 is a battery electric mid-size luxury crossover SUV manufactured by Chinese electric car company Nio. It was announced on the Nio Day in late 2022 and first deliveries are scheduled for June 2023.

== Overview ==
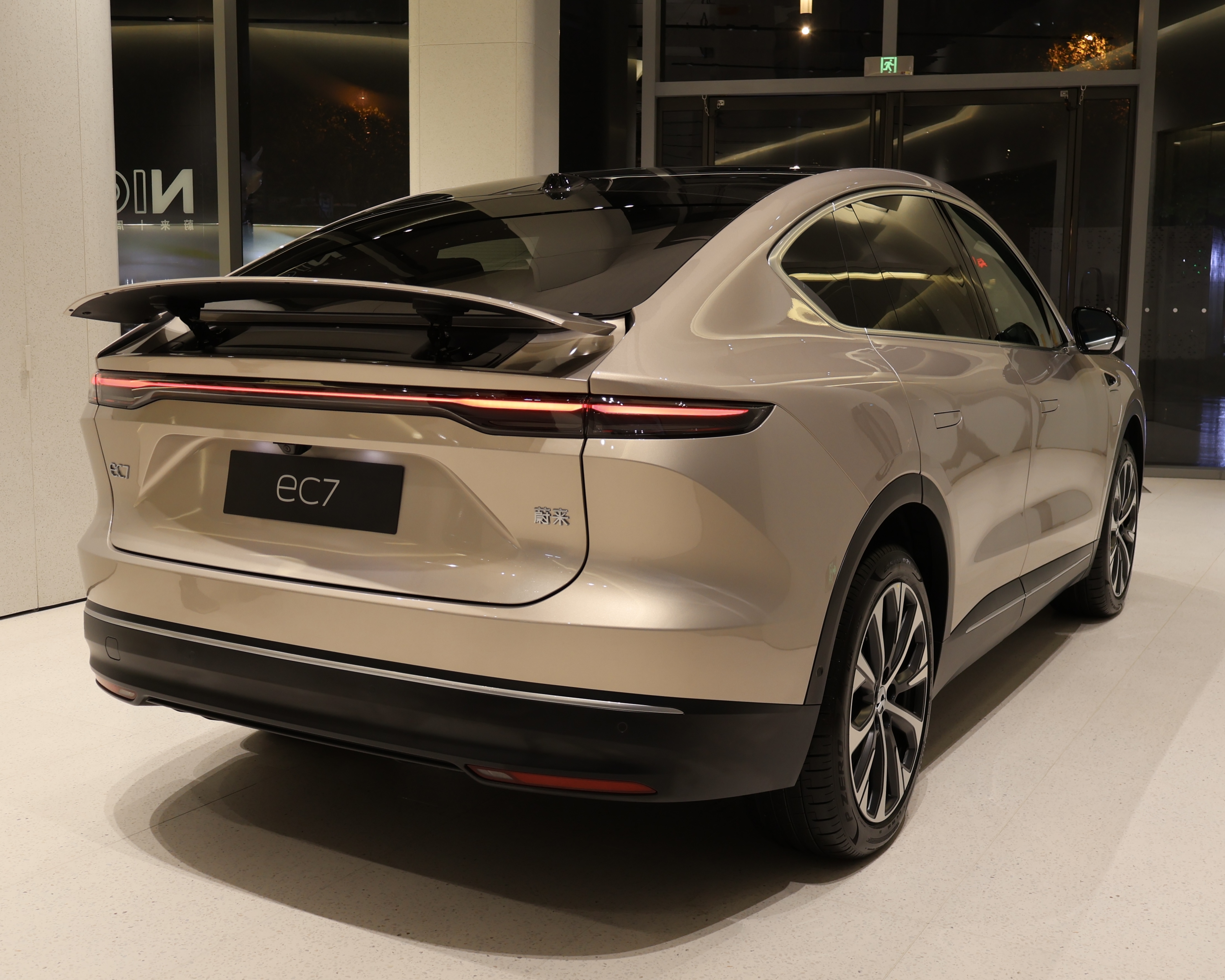
Rear view

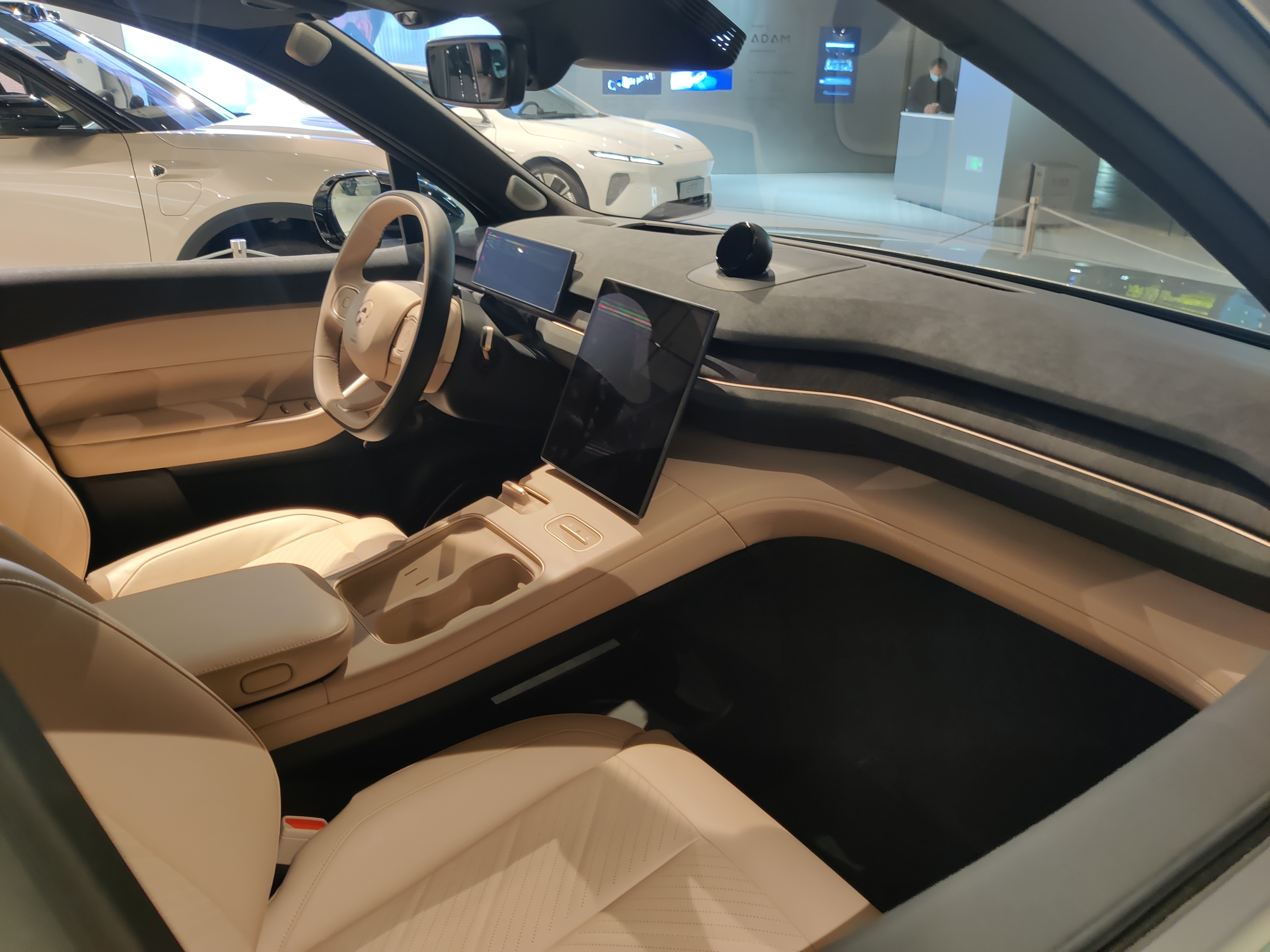
Interior

The EC7 is a 5-door, 5-seater crossover SUV with a sporting roofline. It is a "crossover coupe" counterpart to the more boxy ES7. The car is offered with an option for a 150-kWh battery, available for all current Nio models. The EC7 is powered by a lithium-ion battery pack, which is swappable, just like the Nio ES8. The EC7 acts as a direct competitor to the Tesla Model X.

== Specifications ==
The EC7 generates 487 kW (653 hp), translating into a 0–100 km/h time of 3.8 seconds. This version uses a 300 kW induction motor in the rear and a 180 kW permanent magnet motor in the front.

The EC7 is available with three lithium-ion battery pack options: 75 kWh, 100 kWh, and 150 kWh, officially expected to deliver a CLTC range of up to 490 km (305 miles), up to 635 km (395 miles), and 940 km (584 miles), respectively.

Nio claims that the EC7 has a drag coefficient of 0.23, which is the lowest ever for a production SUV as of 2023. The car features active air suspension, NOMI AI personal assistant, Nappa leather and intelligent fragrance system.

== Sales ==
Year	China
2023	3,661
2024	2,865
2025	1,258
