= WeLion =

Chinese battery manufacturer

Beijing WeLion New Energy Technology Co., Ltd.
- Trade name: WeLion New Energy
- Native name: 北京卫蓝新能源科技有限公司
- Type: Private
- Industry: Electric batteries
- Founded: August 11, 2016; 9 years ago
- Founder: Li Hong; Chen Liquan; Yu Huigen
- Headquarters: Fangshan, Beijing, China
- Key people: Yu Huigen (chairman); Li Hong (president)
- Website: solidstatelion.com/en

Beijing WeLion New Energy Technology Co., Ltd., known simply as WeLion New Energy or WeLion (Mandarin: 卫蓝; pinyin: Wèilán), is a Chinese battery manufacturer specializing in semi-solid and solid state batteries for use in electric vehicles and energy storage systems. The company is headquartered in the Beijing's Fangshan District, and is a spinoff from the Laboratory of Renewable Energy of the Institute of Physics of the Chinese Academy of Sciences. It is best known for supplying the world's first mass produced semi-solid-state battery cells for an automotive traction battery application, in the form of Nio's 150 kWh swappable battery pack.

== History ==
The company was established in 2016 by founders Chen Liquan (Professor at the Chinese Academy of Engineering), Li Hong (researcher at the Chinese Academy of Sciences Institute of Physics), and Yu Huigen (Senior Engineer). Chen Liquan is known as the "father of Chinese lithium battery technology", and was a doctoral advisor to Robin Zeng, founder of CATL. In August 2021, WeLion received a CN¥ 500 million (approximately US$78 million) investment from Geely, Huawei and Xiaomi. The investments are from Hubei Xiaomi Yangtze River Industry Investment Fund Partners (Changjiang Industrial Fund and Xiaomi fund launched in 2017) and Shenzhen Hubble Technology Investment Partners (a Huawei venture capital subsidiary), and Ningbo Geely Blue Initiative Business Management Partners (a Geely Holding Group subsidiary). The investments put WeLion's valuation at CN¥ 5 billion (approximately US$780 million).

On November 4, 2022 WeLion disclosed that it had secured CN¥ 1.5 billion (approximately US$209 million) in Series D financing.

In December 2025, it was revealed through filings that WeLion had agreed to undergo pre-IPO tutoring for a potential listing on the ChiNext stock exchange.

In a televised interview in December 2025, WeLion chairman Yu Huigen stated that the company had created solid-state batteries with an energy density of 824 Wh/kg in laboratory conditions, and that the company was aiming to exceed 1000 Wh/kg as a long term goal.

== Partnerships ==
=== Nio ===
On January 9, 2021, at Nio's 'Nio Day 2020' event, Nio announced that a 150 kWh semi-solid state battery pack would later be made available. Later, it was revealed that WeLion would be the supplier of the battery cells. On June 30, 2023, Nio received the first shipments of the battery cells, and the packs first became available for rent by the public in mid-2024. The semi-solid state battery cells allow for a 50% higher energy capacity, with an energy density of 360 Wh/kg, in the same dimensions compared to a conventional pack, with only a minor 20-kilogram (44 lb) weight increase, allowing for a range of 1,050-kilometre (650 mi) range in the ET7 sedan.

=== Tianqi Lithium ===
On May 20, 2021 WeLion signed an agreement with a subsidiary of Tianqi Lithium to form a joint venture. The aim of the joint venture is to develop, produce and sell lithium anode materials, and manufacturing equipment and ingredients for battery pre-lithiation processes.

=== Ronbay Technology ===
In April 2022, WeLion signed a five-year agreement with Ronbay Technology for the supply of at least 30,000 tons of battery cathode materials. The agreement stipulates that Ronbay will be WeLion's primary supplier of high-nickel cathode materials for use in NMC chemistry solid-state batteries.

=== JAC Yiwei ===
On April 22, 2024 WeLion and JAC signed an agreement for the supply of semi-solid state battery cells for use in Yiwei brand cars. The batteries will be cylindrical 4695 format cells, and will be used in Yiwei's second generation DI platform, with the first vehicle expected to launch in 2025.

=== Longquan Energy Storage ===
On June 6, 2024 the Longquan Energy Storage project located near Longquan, Zhejiang was connected to the grid. The now operational first phase has a capacity of 200 MWh and an output of 100 MW and uses WeLion's semi-solid state cells, making it the world's first large scale use of semi-solid state batteries in a battery energy storage system context. The project is run by state-owned Power China, and is eventually planned to have a 400 MWh capacity and 200 MW output on the 40-acre site. It uses LFP solid-liquid hybrid electrolyte battery cells with a cell capacity of 280 Ah, energy density of 165 Wh/kg, a rated lifespan of 6000 cycles, and an operating range between −20–60 °C (−4–140 °F). Annual discharge is estimated to be over 60,000 GWh.

== Facilities ==
WeLion is headquartered in Beijing and currently has four production facilities located throughout China.

Facilities
Location	Operations	Size	Capacity	Build Date
Fangshan, Beijing	Headquarters	4.66 + 10.1 ha (70 + 151 mu)	–	–
Fangshan, Beijing	Primary R&D center	4.66 + 10.1 ha (70 + 151 mu)	–	–
Fangshan, Beijing	Solid-state battery manufacturing	4.66 + 10.1 ha (70 + 151 mu)	8 GWh	2025
Zibo, Shandong	Semi-solid & solid state battery manufacturing	36.6 ha (550 mu)	20 GWh (Phase 1) 100 GWh (completion)	September 2023 (Phase 1)
Liyang, Jiangsu	Low cost non-aviation device battery manufacturing	2.53 ha (38 mu)	0.2 GWh	August 2020
Huzhou, Zhejiang	Automotive battery manufacturing	4.66 + 33.3 ha (70 + 500 mu)	2 + 20 GWh	Q3 2022 + Q4 2025
Huzhou, Zhejiang	Satellite R&D center	4.66 + 33.3 ha (70 + 500 mu)	–	July 2023
Shaoxing, Zhejiang	Battery materials manufacturing	1.5 ha	10 kiloton	End of 2023
Shenzhen, Guangzhou	Satellite R&D and solid-state testing center	5742 m^{2}	0.6 GWh	March 2025

=== Beijing Fangshan Base ===
- Headquarters, R&D and solid-state battery mass production
- 4.66 + 10.1 ha
- 8 GWh capacity
- 2025

=== Zibo Base, Shandong ===
- Energy storage base
- (550 mu)
- 20 GWh capacity (energy storage applications)
- September 2023 (Phase 1)
- semi-solid state and solid state battery cells

On February 25, 2022 WeLion held a groundbreaking ceremony for a new battery factory project in the city of Zibo located in eastern Shandong. The project involves a total investment of CN¥ 40 billion (US$6.3 billion) in a 550 mu (36.7 ha) facility, resulting in a projected annual capacity of 100 GWh. The first phase of the project involved CN¥ 10.2 billion (US$1.61 billion) of investment and is be capable of 20 GWh of annual capacity, and was completed in September 2023; it will manufacture semi-solid and solid-state batteries. At the time, WeLion claimed that the facility has the highest safety factor and energy density in China.

=== Liyang, Jiangsu Base ===
- Low-altitude economic power base
- 2.53 ha
- 0.2 GWh capacity
- August 2020

Manufactures 320Wh/kg low cost power batteries for use in low-altitude applications, such as drones, robots and portable power supplies, according to WeLion's website.

=== Huzhou, Zhejiang base ===
- Car power base
- 4.66 + 33.3 ha
- 2 + 20 GWh capacity
- Q3 2022 + Q4 2025

This facility manufactures semi-solid state power batteries for use in electric vehicles. Construction of this factory in Huzhou, Zhejiang began in 2021, and was completed in Q3 of 2022. On November 22, 2022 WeLion held a ceremony commemorating the production of the first battery cell on the production line at the facility. On June 30, 2023 WeLion held a ceremony at the Huzhou factory for their first delivery of battery cells to Nio. The cells use a semi-solid state electrolyte, and have an energy density of 360 Wh/kg, and are used in a 150 kWh swappable battery pack made by Nio.

WeLion's R&D center for the Yangtze River Delta region is also located in Huzhou, and its completion was also announced at the ceremony.

==== Shaoxing, Zhejiang pulp base ====
- Solid state materials and solid state battery production base project
- 1.5 ha
- 10,000 tons capacity
- End of 2023 production date

Supplies battery materials for final manufacture at the nearby Huzhou factory.

=== Shenzhen Pingshan, Guangdong ===
- Solid-state battery R&D base
- 5742 m^{2}
- 600 MWh capacity
- March 2025
