= Nio ES8 =

Battery electric full-size luxury crossover SUV

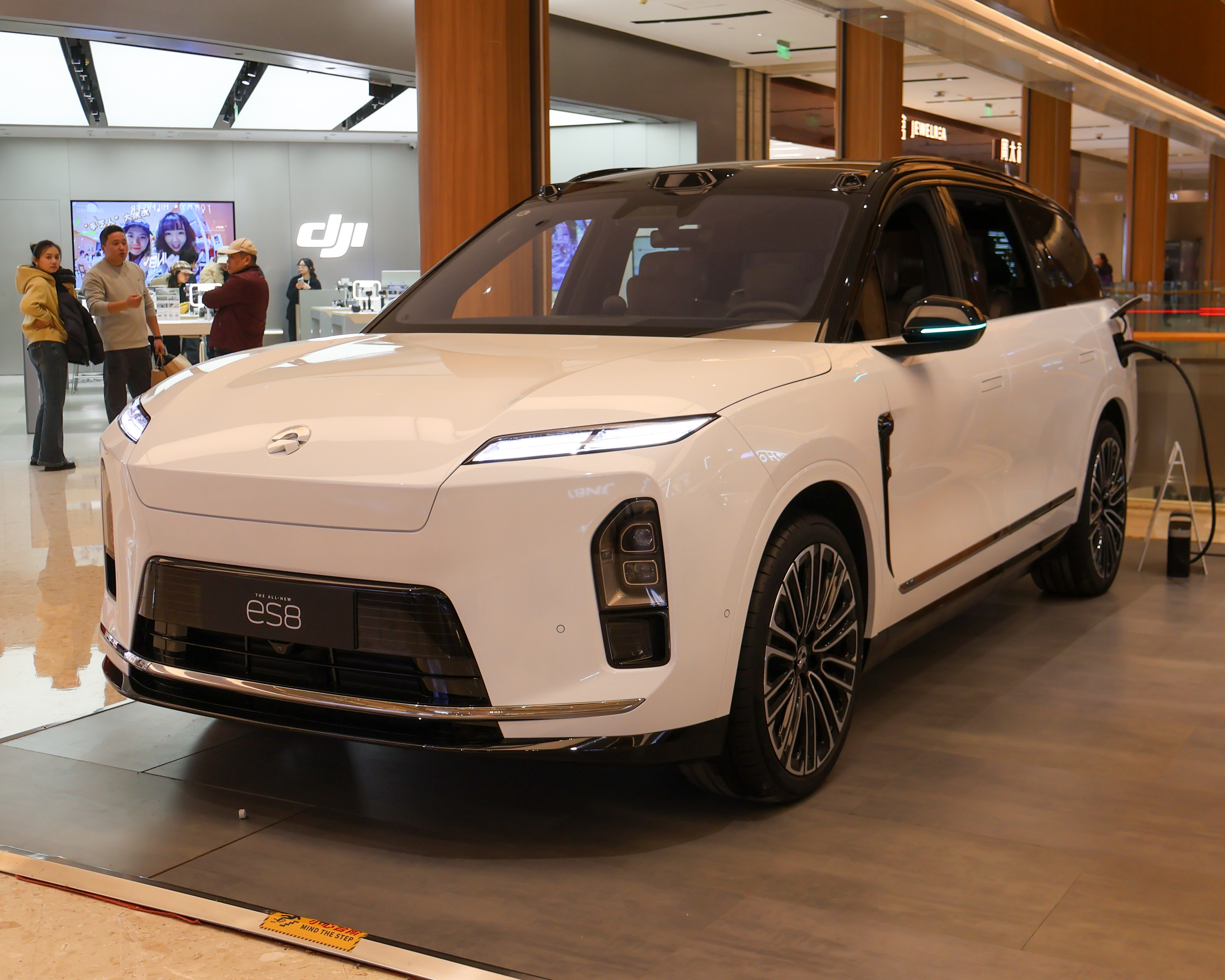

Overview
- Manufacturer: Nio Inc.
- Production: 2018–present

Body and chassis
- Class: Full-size luxury crossover SUV
- Body style: 5-door SUV

The Nio ES8 is a battery electric full-size luxury crossover SUV manufactured by Chinese electric car company Nio. The ES8 was put into production in June 2018 for the Chinese market, and on 30 September 2021 it was launched in Norway.

== First generation (2018–2023) ==
First generation
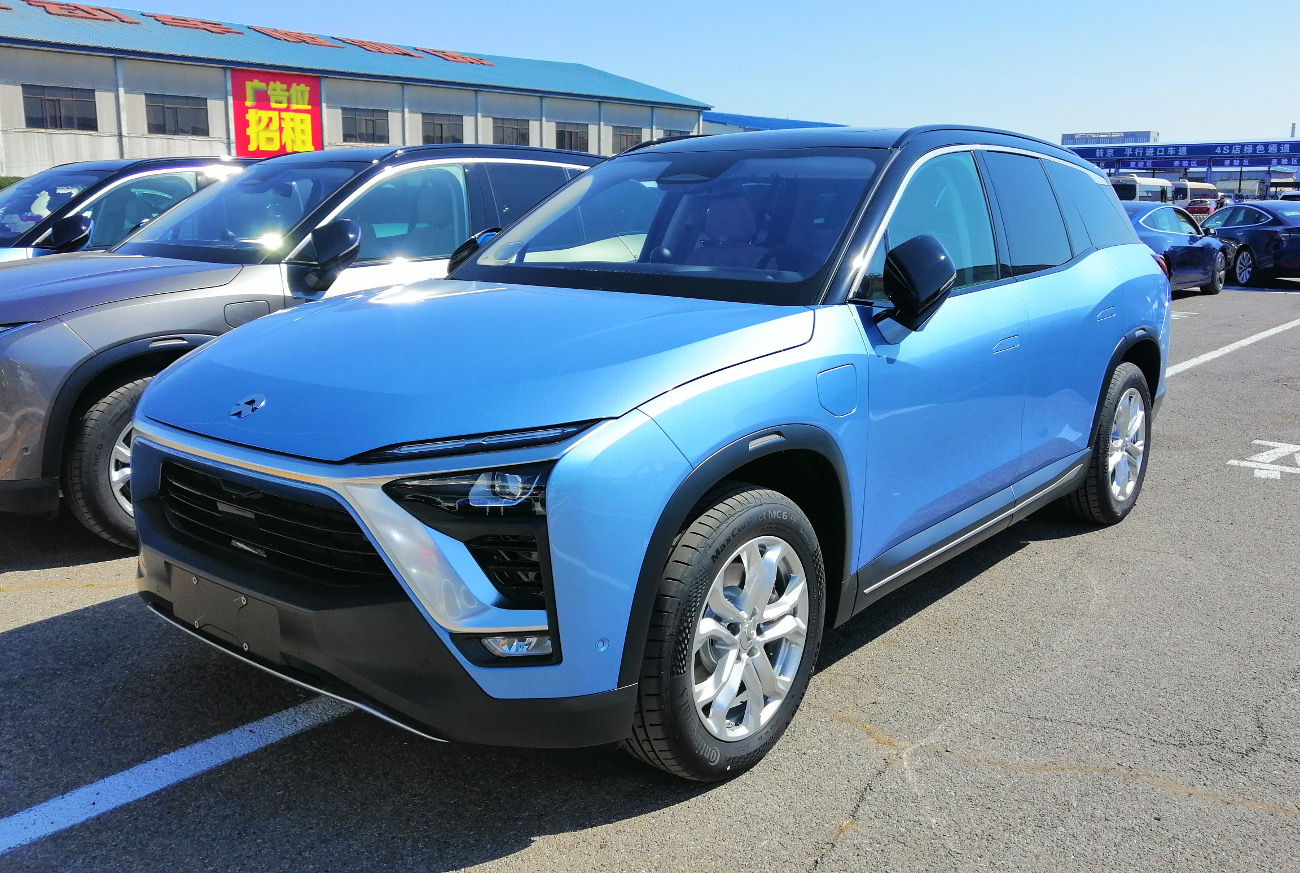

Overview
- Production: 2018–2023
- Assembly: China: Hefei, Anhui
- Designer: Park Soo-wan, Salvatore Aita, Jim Baste, Vasiliy Kurkov, Suh Ju-ho, Kris Tomasson

Body and chassis
- Layout: Dual-motor, all-wheel drive

Powertrain
- Electric motor: AC induction/asynchronous, Permanent magnet motor
- Transmission: 1-speed direct-drive reduction
- Battery: 75 kWh Li-ion; 84 kWh Li-ion; 100 kWh Li-ion
- Electric range: 500 km (311 mi) WLTP with 100kWh battery

Dimensions
- Wheelbase: 3,010 mm (118.5 in)
- Length: 5,022 mm (197.7 in)
- Width: 1,962 mm (77.2 in)
- Height: 1,756 mm (69.1 in)
- Curb weight: 2,460 kg (5,423 lb)

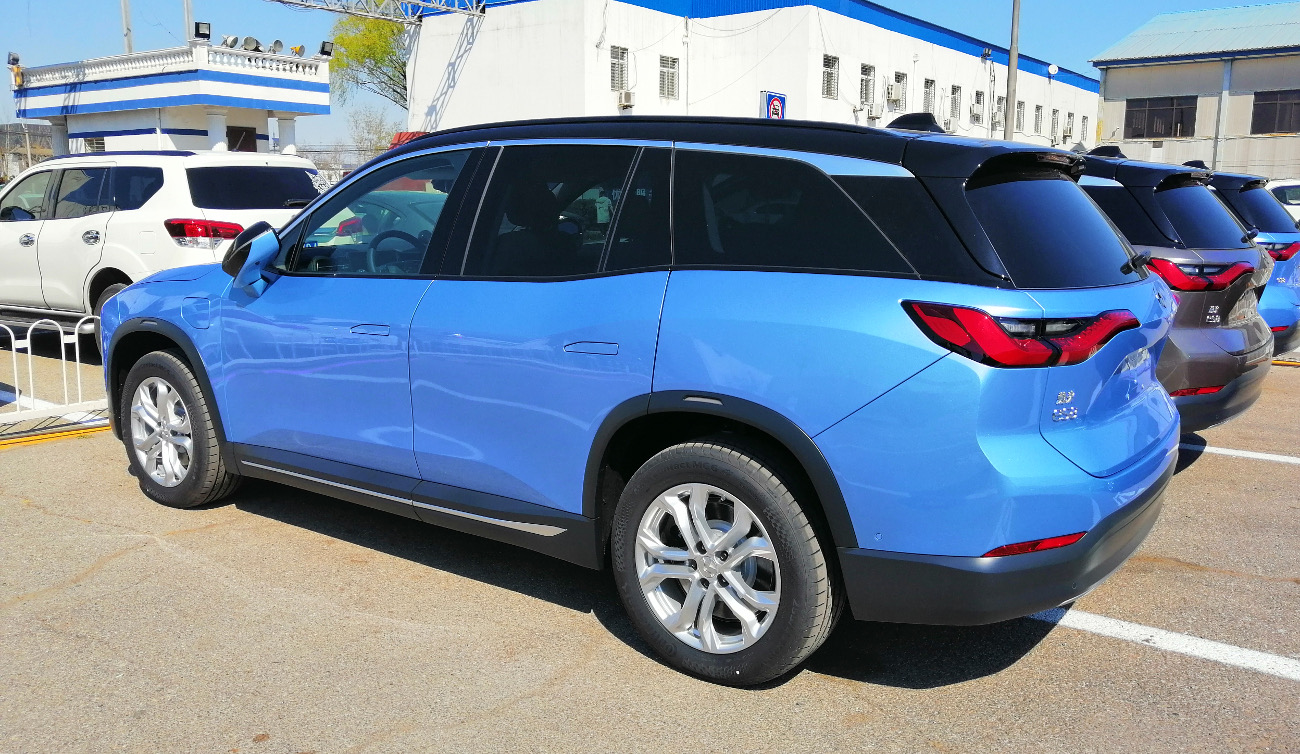
Rear view

The first generation ES8 was first unveiled in December 2017 and production started in 2018. The name ES8 is derived from E means "Electric", S means "SUV", the ES8 is an SUV and 8 refers to its model range in Nio's Performance product range i.e., 1–9, "9" being the top of the range.

Nio tested the vehicle for thousands of kilometres in Yakeshi, Inner Mongolia, China, and Australia to test the car's winter and summer economy and cold and hot temperature performance.

Nio is cooperating with a number of suppliers including Bosch.

=== Specifications ===
The ES8 is powered by a 70 kWh or 84 kWh lithium-ion battery pack (upgraded to 100 kWh in 2019) that is also swappable.

The ES8 is a 6 or 7-seater full-size production car, with a wheelbase of 2,997 mm (118 in) and a body length of 5,022 mm (198 in). The body and chassis are completely aluminum (96.4%), and the drivetrain is all-wheel drive as standard, and also features active air suspension. The design includes the X-bar and Nio's signature "Spark Beat" taillights.

=== 2020 facelift ===
In March 2020, a revised ES8 was released. It uses a combination of 160 kW (215 hp; 218 PS) permanent magnet and 240 kW (322 hp; 326 PS) induction magnet motors. It can accelerate from 0 to 100 km/h (0 to 62 mph) in 4.9 seconds and a NEDC range rating of up to 580 km (360 mi). From 2020, the digital cockpit was upgraded to a 9.8-inch display with an 11.3-inch high-definition multi-touch center display. The NOMI Mate 2.0 features an industry-first circular AMOLED display, with much larger active display area. Additionally, ES8 comes with a smart charging port cover and NFC key card. Euro NCAP confirmed a 5 star rating for the ES8 in September 2021.

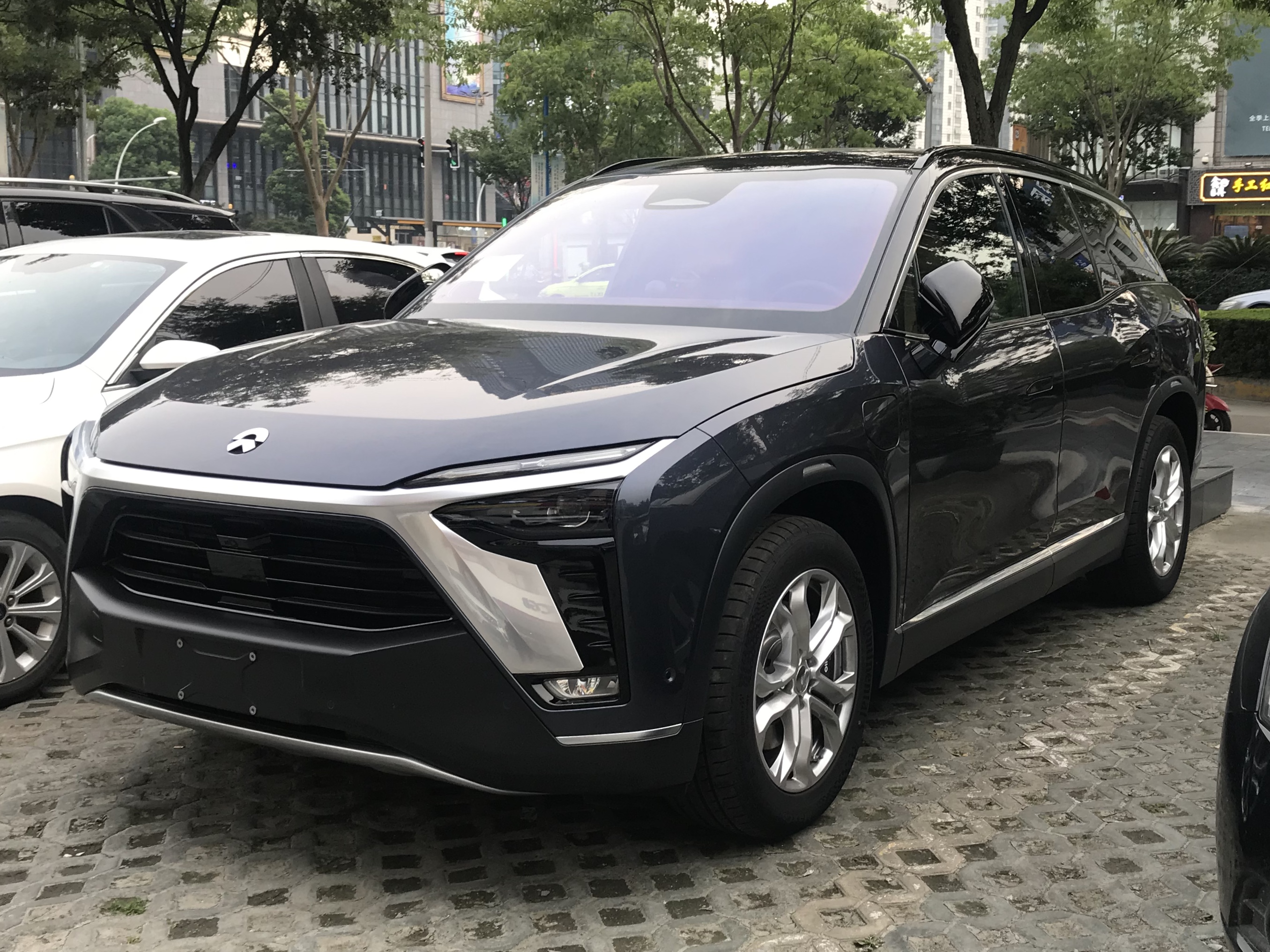
Nio ES8 2020 (facelift)

=== Safety ===
C-NCAP (2018) test results 2019 Nio ES8 7-seater
Category		%
Overall:	5 /5 stars	88.4%
Occupant protection:		92.87%
Vulnerable road users:		67.79%
Active safety:		88.38%

Euro NCAP test results Nio ES8, 6 seat (LHD) (2021)
Test	Points	%
Overall:	5 /5 stars	
Adult occupant:	31.5	82%
Child occupant:	41.5	84%
Pedestrian:	39.3	72%
Safety assist:	14.8	92%

== Second generation (2023–2025) ==
Second generation
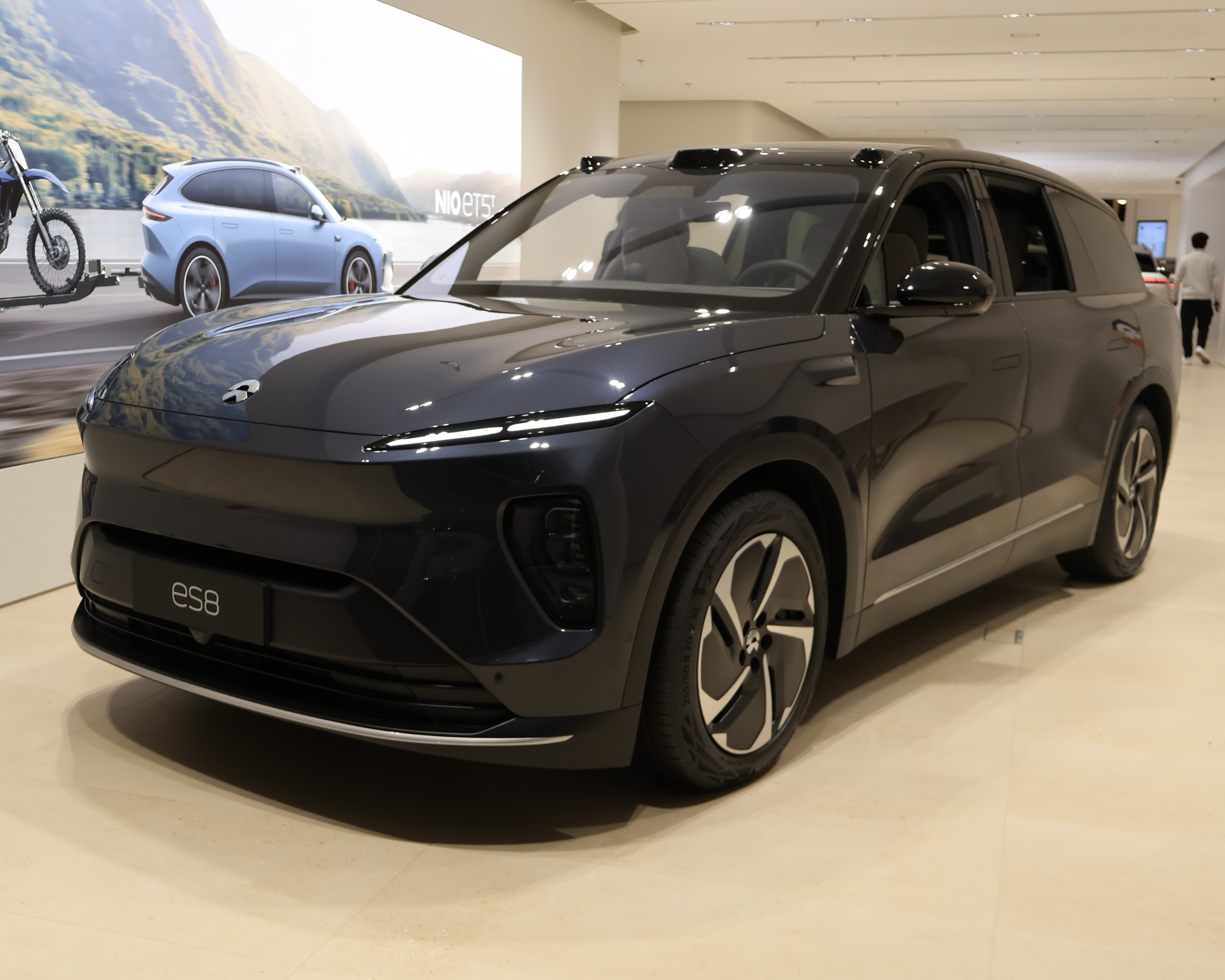

Overview
- Model code: Aries
- Also called: Nio EL8 (Europe)
- Production: 2023–2025
- Assembly: China: Hefei, Anhui

Body and chassis
- Layout: Dual-motor, all-wheel drive
- Platform: NT 2.0

Powertrain
- Electric motor: 180 kW TZ180S001 PMSM (front), 300 kW YS300S002 AC induction (rear)
- Transmission: 1-speed direct-drive reduction
- Battery: 75 kWh LFP-NMC hybrid CATL; 75 kWh LFP CATL; 100 kWh NMC CATL/CALB; 150 kWh NMC semi-solid-state WeLion
- Electric range: 379–510 km (235–317 mi) (WLTP); 465–605 km (289–376 mi) (CLTC); 900 km (559 mi) (CLTC, 150 kWh)
- Plug-in charging: 180 kW (DC); 3.3 kW V2L

Dimensions
- Wheelbase: 3,070 mm (120.9 in)
- Length: 5,099 mm (200.7 in)
- Width: 1,989 mm (78.3 in)
- Height: 1,750 mm (68.9 in)
- Curb weight: 2,565–2,585 kg (5,655–5,699 lb)

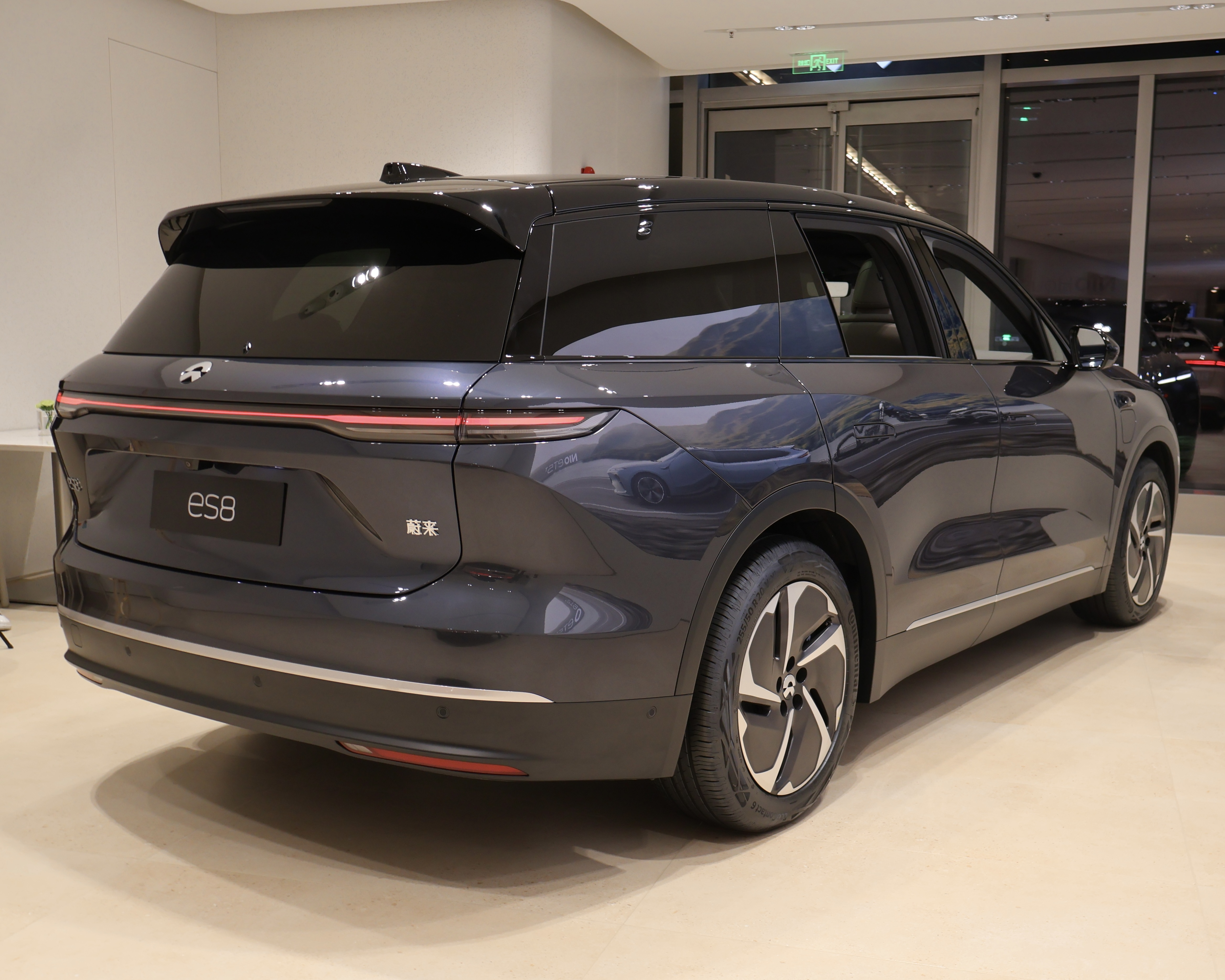
Rear view

The second generation Nio ES8 was unveiled during the Nio Day in December 2022 riding on the NT2.0 platform.

The dashboard features a 10.2-inch miniLED instrument panel, 16.3-inch augmented-reality heads-up display, and a 12.8-inch vertically-oriented 3K-resolution AMOLED central infotainment touchscreen all powered by a Snapdragon 8295 SoC with 16GB of RAM and 256GB of storage. The rear also has access to a 6.6-inch miniLED touchscreen. Its ADAS system consists of a 32-sensor suite, including a roof-mounted 150-line Innovusion (Seyond) Falcon long-range LiDAR, 5 mmWave radars, 11 exterior cameras, and 12 ultrasonic sensors. It is powered by Nio's Adam compute module, which consists of four Nvidia Orin-X chips for a nominal total of 1016 TOPS.

=== Specifications ===
The second generation model features a 180 kW (241 hp; 245 PS) permanent magnet synchronous front motor and a 300 kW (402 hp; 408 PS) induction rear motor reaching a combined maximum power output of 480 kW (644 hp; 653 PS) and 850 N⋅m (627 lb⋅ft) of torque. Acceleration from 0–100 km/h (0–62 mph) is 4.1 seconds, and the top speed is 200 km/h (124 mph).

Two battery packs are available as well as a battery leasing program, with the 75 kWh battery supporting a CLTC range of 465 km (289 mi), the 100 kWh pack supporting a CLTC range of 605 km (376 mi). A 150 kWh semi-solid-state pack supplied by WeLion is available exclusively as a temporary rental option which can be installed at a battery swap station. It has a CLTC range rating of 900 km (559 mi).

Specs
Battery	Motor		Power			Torque			Range		DCFC	0–100 km/h (62 mph)	Top Speed
Battery	Front	Rear	Front	Rear	Total	Front	Rear	Total	WLTP	CLTC	Peak	0–100 km/h (62 mph)	Top Speed
75 kWh	PMSM 180 kW TZ180S001	Induction 300 kW YS300S002	235 hp (175 kW; 238 PS)	402 hp (300 kW; 408 PS)	644 hp (480 kW; 653 PS)	350 N⋅m (258 lb⋅ft)	500 N⋅m (369 lb⋅ft)	850 N⋅m (627 lb⋅ft)	379–390 km (235–242 mi)	465 km (289 mi)	180 kW	4.1 s	200 km/h (124 mph)
100 kWh	PMSM 180 kW TZ180S001	Induction 300 kW YS300S002	235 hp (175 kW; 238 PS)	402 hp (300 kW; 408 PS)	644 hp (480 kW; 653 PS)	350 N⋅m (258 lb⋅ft)	500 N⋅m (369 lb⋅ft)	850 N⋅m (627 lb⋅ft)	493–510 km (306–317 mi)	605 km (376 mi)	180 kW	4.1 s	200 km/h (124 mph)
150 kWh (rental only)	PMSM 180 kW TZ180S001	Induction 300 kW YS300S002	235 hp (175 kW; 238 PS)	402 hp (300 kW; 408 PS)	644 hp (480 kW; 653 PS)	350 N⋅m (258 lb⋅ft)	500 N⋅m (369 lb⋅ft)	850 N⋅m (627 lb⋅ft)	—	900 km (560 mi)	—	4.1 s	200 km/h (124 mph)

== Third generation (2025–present) ==
Third generation
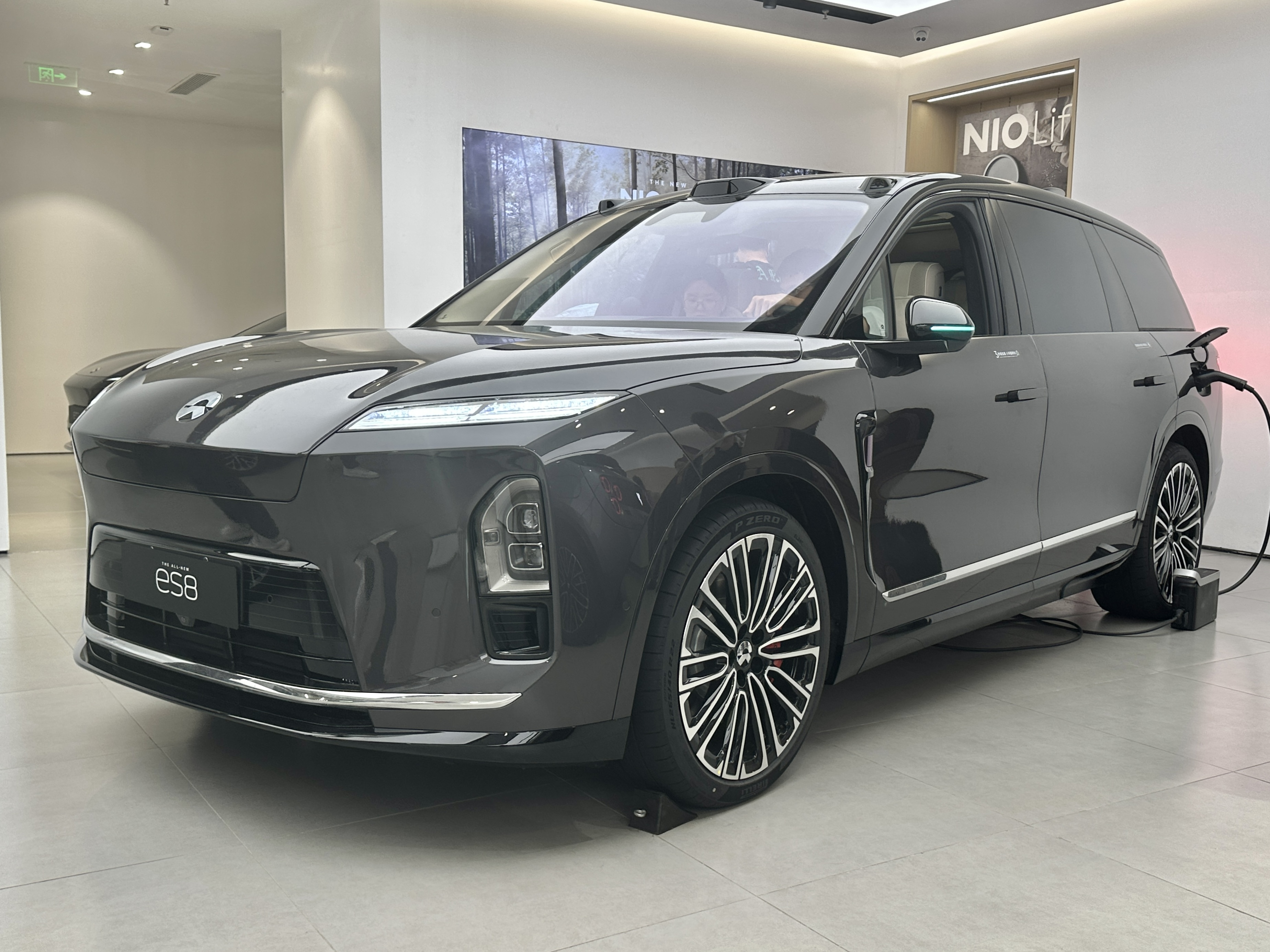

Overview
- Model code: Cetus
- Production: 2025–present
- Assembly: China: Hefei, Anhui

Body and chassis
- Layout: Dual-motor, all-wheel drive
- Platform: NT 3.0
- Related: Nio ES9; Onvo L90

Powertrain
- Power output: 520 kW (697 hp)
- Battery: 102 kWh NMC CATL
- Electric range: 635–655 km (395–407 mi) (CLTC)
- Plug-in charging: 420 kW (DC)

Dimensions
- Wheelbase: 3,130 mm (123.2 in)
- Length: 5,280 mm (207.9 in)
- Width: 2,010 mm (79.1 in)
- Height: 1,800 mm (70.9 in)
- Curb weight: 2,590–2,630 kg (5,710–5,798 lb)

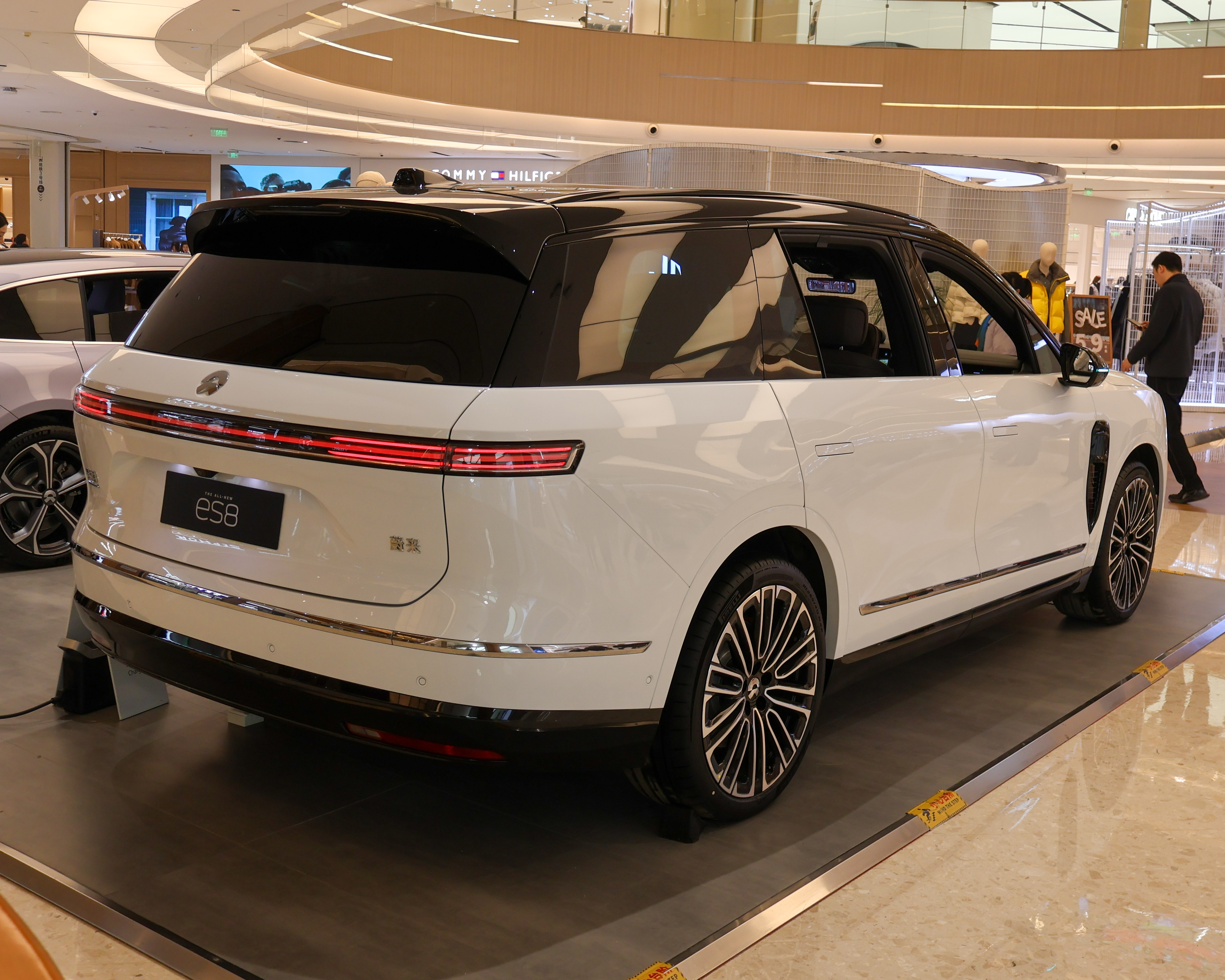
Rear view

The third generation ES8 was revealed through China's MIIT filings on 20 June 2025. It is codenamed Cetus and rides on the NT 3.0 platform, which it shares with the flagship Nio ET9. It launched on 20 September 2025 at Nio Day 2025.

=== Exterior ===
Compared to its predecessor, the third generation model grew by 181 mm (7.1 in) in length, 21 mm (0.8 in) in width, and 50 mm (2.0 in) in height. Its design takes on a similar approach to the ET9 and the facelifted ES6 and EC6. It has a drag coefficient of 0.259 Cd.

It is equipped with Adaptive Driving Beam projector headlights, which can shape the beam to highlight the road for features such as lane navigation assistance, two-wheeler warning alert, and vehicle width guidance. It is also used to display a welcome animation and a light show when parked.

Nio says the ES8 has 6.2 m^{2} (67 sq ft) of total floor space, and has the largest door openings in its class, with the second row doorways measuring 1,163 mm (45.8 in) high and 963 mm (37.9 in) wide. All doors have soft-close and electronic unlatching with interior mechanical backup handles.

The ES8's ADAS system is powered by Nio's self-developed Shenji NX9031 chips along with a 31-sensor suite, including 1 roof-mounted Seyond Falcon 300-line long-range LiDAR, 2 fender-mounted wide-angle LiDARs, 1 4D mmWave radar, 7 8-megapixel cameras, 4 3-megapixel surround-view cameras, and 12 ultrasonic sensors.

The ES8 has five-link fully independent suspension geometry both front and rear, and is equipped with continuous damping control and dual-chamber air-suspension capable of 100 mm (3.9 in) of ride height adjustment, which is used to automatically lower the vehicle for easier entry and automatic self-leveling on uneven surfaces. The front wheels are capable of a maximum steering angle of 41°, allowing for a turning radius of 5.7 m (18 ft 8 in).

=== Interior ===
The ES8 was initially available in either 2+2+2 six-seater or 2+3+2 seven-seater configurations, with a two-row five-seater version launching in July 2026. The dashboard contains a 'floating' 15.6-inch 3K-resolution AMOLED central infotainment display, a narrow 48-inch dashboard-spanning 'Skyline' information display, and a 38-inch AR-HUD serving as the instrument cluster, all powered by a Qualcomm Snapdragon 8295P SoC.

Nio says the ES8 has 111 physical buttons located throughout the interior, including door-mounted seat adjustment controls. Nio also says the interior upholstery uses a total of 120,000 stitches and 27.5 m (90 ft) of satin piping. The interior is available in 5 color options, which feature Nappa leather, burl wood trim, and satin-finish metallic accents: Sappanwood Red, Warm Gravel, Gangri Blue, Pamir Brown, and Mesa Brown.

Nio says the rear has 3.7 m^{2} (40 sq ft) of flat floor space, allowing for children up to 1.3 m (4 ft 3 in) tall to stand fully upright to access the third row. The front passenger seat and both second row seats in the six-seater model have a 'zero-gravity' recline mode, and the third row seats can recline up to 130°; only the passenger side second row seat has access to the recline mode in seven-seater models, while for five-seater models it's only available for the first row. The front seats with their headrests removed can fold back 180° to create a lounge chair in conjunction with the second row seats. The second row has access to a folding ceiling-mounted 21.4-inch miniLED entertainment display with Dolby Vision HDR, capable of screen mirroring from devices such as laptops or game consoles like the Nintendo Switch. The second-row seatbacks have airline-style folding tray tables, in-built manual sunshades, ceiling-mounted LED-lit vanity mirrors, and an 8-inch control touchscreen is located on back of the center console. It has optional liquid crystal electronic dimming windows for the second and third row side windows with 3 levels of dimming up to 0.35% transparency.

The ES8 has five-zone climate control (4-zone in 2-row models). It has Nio's self-developed Lyra 2600-watt 27-speaker 7.1.4 surround sound system with Dolby Atmos, featuring 8 groups of surround speakers, 1 subwoofer, 4 ceiling mounted speakers, and 2 headrest mounted speakers. It has a 1.4 m^{2} (15 sq ft) panoramic sunroof.

The ES8 has a 230-litre (8.1 cu ft) power-opening frunk, and the 3-row version has 547 L (19.3 cu ft) of rear cargo storage space; the 2-row version has 1,334 L (47.1 cu ft) of rear cargo space with an additional 268-litre (9.5 cu ft) underfloor compartment, expanding to 3,084 L (108.9 cu ft) with the second row folded down. The two-row version also comes with a Haptex-upholstered parcel shelf.

=== Powertrain ===
The third generation ES8 has a 900-volt class electric platform and features a 180 kW (241 hp; 245 PS) front-mounted motor and a 340 kW (456 hp; 462 PS) rear-mounted motor for a total of 520 kW (697 hp; 707 PS) and 700 N⋅m (516 lb⋅ft) of torque, with the rear being 40 kW (54 hp; 54 PS) more than its predecessor. It achieves a 0–100 km/h (62 mph) time of 3.97 seconds and has a top speed of 220 km/h (137 mph). It is powered by a 102kWh CATL-supplied NMC battery pack providing 635 km (395 mi) of CLTC range, and can be swapped at a swap station in 3 minutes. Alternatively, it can be charged at a peak rate of 600kW at a maximum of 925 volts or 765 amps to replenish 250 km (155 mi) of range within 5 minutes.

Battery		Motor		Power			Torque			Range	Top speed	Kerb weight
Type	Weight	Front	Rear	Front	Rear	Total	Front	Rear	Total	CLTC	Top speed	Kerb weight
102 kWh NMC CATL	545 kg (1,202 lb)	Induction 180 kW YS198S003	PMSM 340 kW TZ198Y001	242 hp (180 kW; 245 PS)	456 hp (340 kW; 462 PS)	697 hp (520 kW; 707 PS)	300 N⋅m (221 lb⋅ft)	400 N⋅m (295 lb⋅ft)	700 N⋅m (516 lb⋅ft)	635–655 km (395–407 mi)	220 km/h (137 mph)	2,950–2,630 kg (6,504–5,798 lb)

== Sales ==
Two days after the launch of the third-generation ES8 on 20 September 2025, production capacity for 2025 had sold out with estimated delivery dates reaching as far as March 2026, with an externally estimated 40,000 locked-in orders and 100,000 cancellable pre-orders. Deliveries of the third-generation ES8 reached the 10,000 milestone on 31 October 2025, 20,000 on 29 November 2025, 30,000 on 18 December 2025, 40,000 on 28 December 2025, 120,000 on 22 June 2026, and 150,000 on 20 September 2026. Nio sold 22,258 ES8s in December 2025 alone.

Year	China
2018	12,807
2019	8,169
2020	11,106
2021	20,943
2022	14,380
2023	14,138
2024	9,188
2025	42,889
