= Nio ET7 =

Battery electric executive sedan

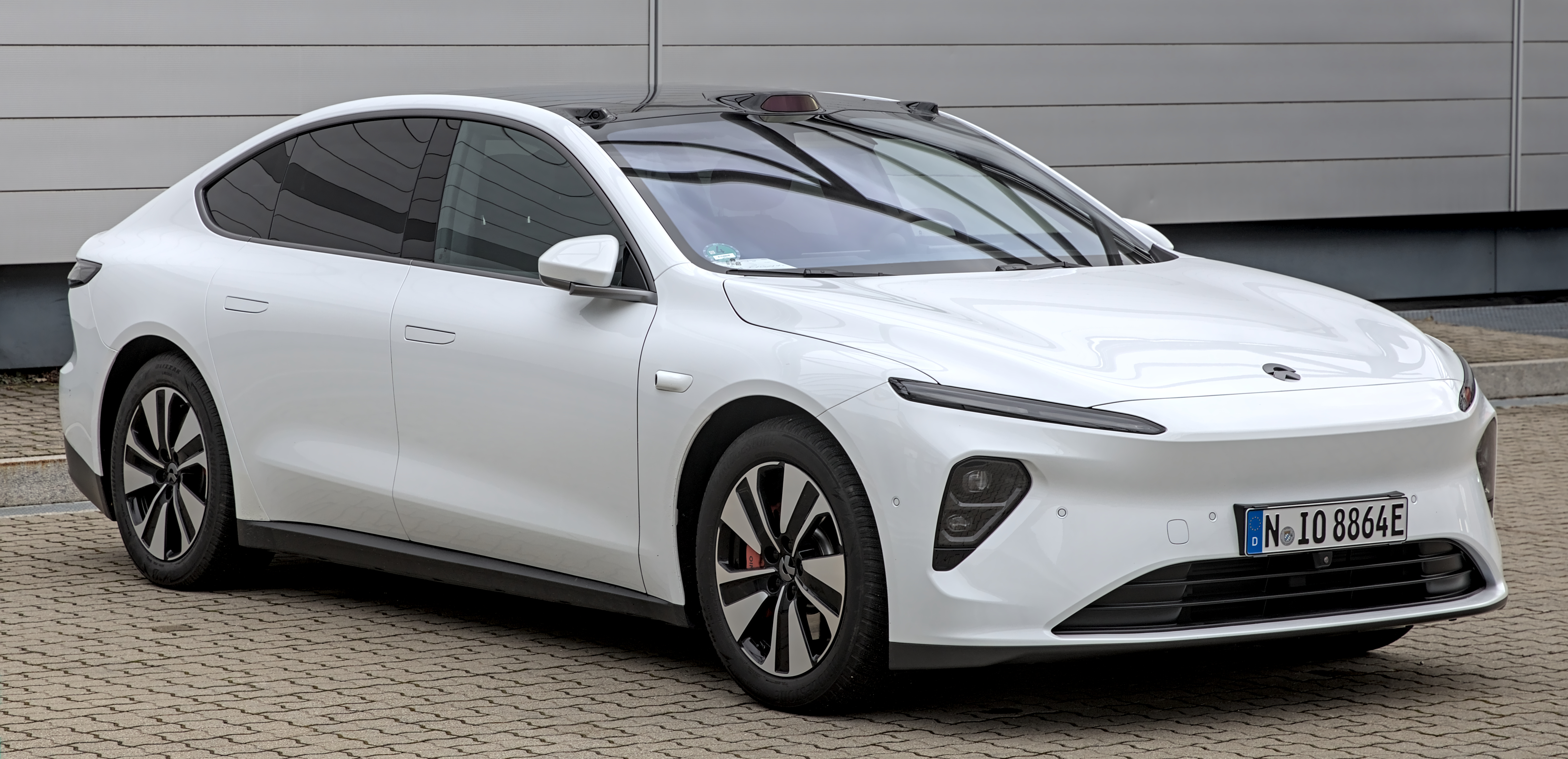

Overview
- Manufacturer: Nio Inc.
- Production: March 2022 – present
- Assembly: China: Hefei, Anhui
- Designer: Jeasoo Kim

Body and chassis
- Class: Executive car (E)
- Body style: 4-door sedan
- Layout: Dual-motor, all-wheel-drive

Powertrain
- Electric motor: TZ180S001 permanent magnet AC motor (front); YS300S001 induction AC motor (rear)
- Power output: 480 kW (653 PS; 644 hp)
- Transmission: Single-speed gear reduction
- Battery: 75 kWh NMC/LFP-hybrid, LFP CATL; 100 kWh NMC CATL/CALB; 150 kWh semi-solid state NMC WeLion
- Electric range: 550–1,050 km (340–650 mi) (CLTC); 445–580 km (277–360 mi) (WLTP)

Dimensions
- Wheelbase: 3,060 mm (120.5 in)
- Length: 5,101 mm (200.8 in)
- Width: 1,987 mm (78.2 in)
- Height: 1,505 mm (59.3 in)
- Curb weight: 2,349–2,379 kg (5,179–5,245 lb)

The Nio ET7 is a battery electric executive sedan produced by Chinese electric car company Nio. The ET7 is the first Nio vehicle to come equipped with LiDAR, and was serving as Nio's flagship model before the ET9 began deliveries in early 2025.

== Overview ==
=== Nio ET Preview concept ===
The Nio ET Preview concept electric sedan was revealed at Auto Shanghai in April 2019. It exhibited Nio's upcoming ET series of sedans, and more specifically, the ET7. It is equipped with a Level 4 autonomous driving system, and is compatible with Nio Power charging solutions, including battery swap stations, mobile charging vans, and charging station network. It is equipped with dual-motor all-wheel drive and has a driving range of over 400 kilometres (250 mi). The production ET7 retains many of the design cues and overall shape featured in the concept.

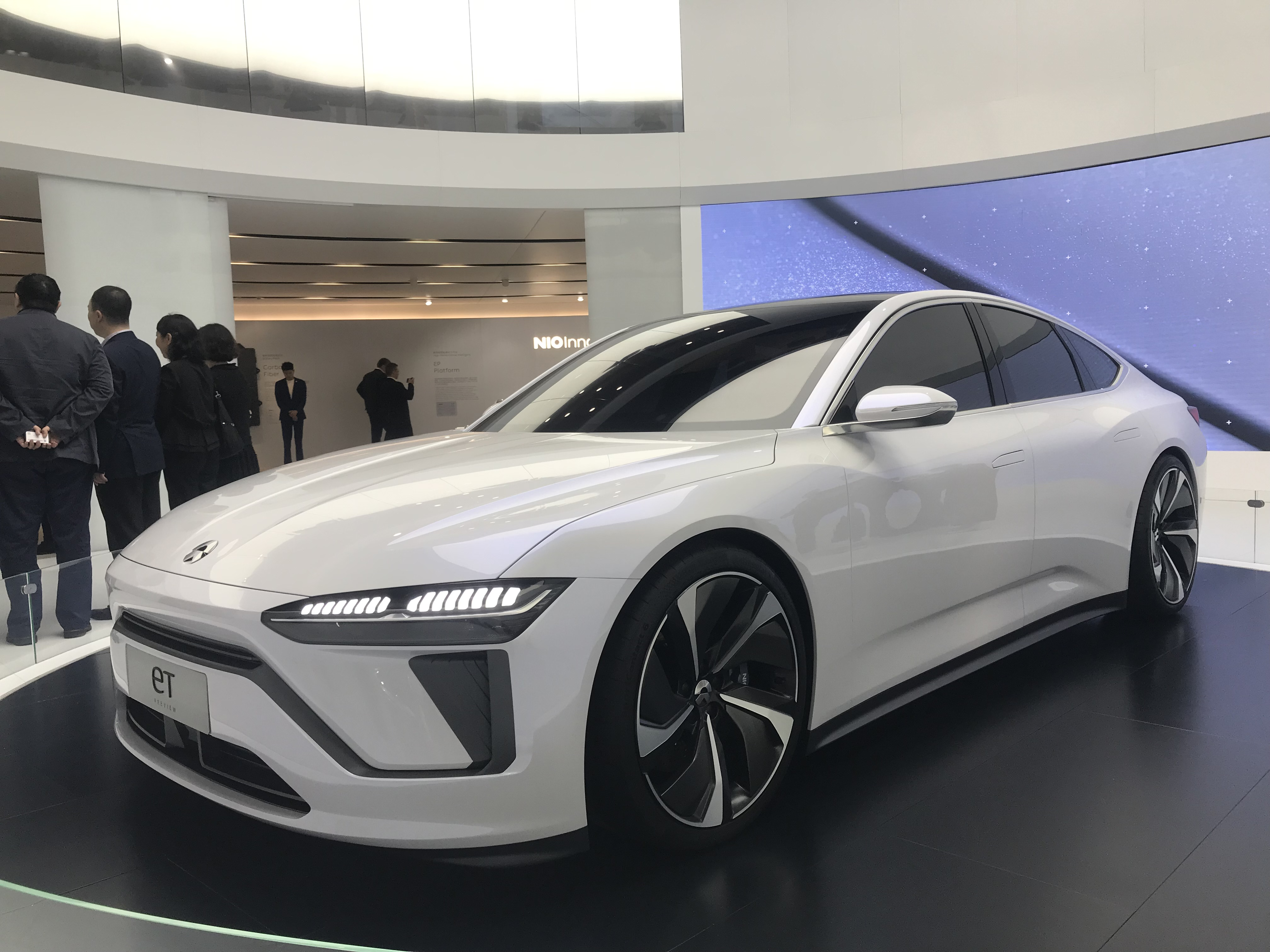
Nio ET Preview concept (front)

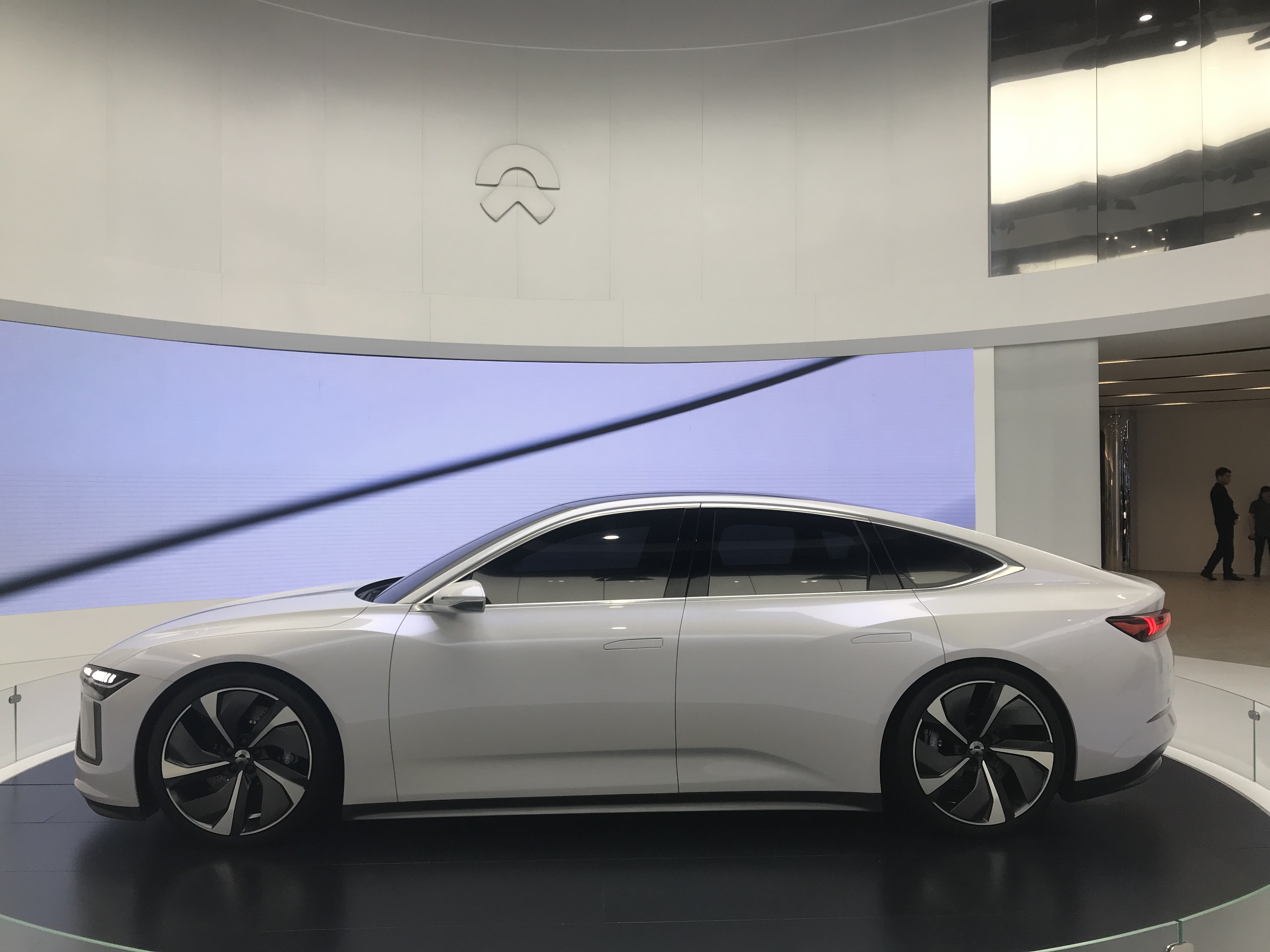
Nio ET Preview concept (side)

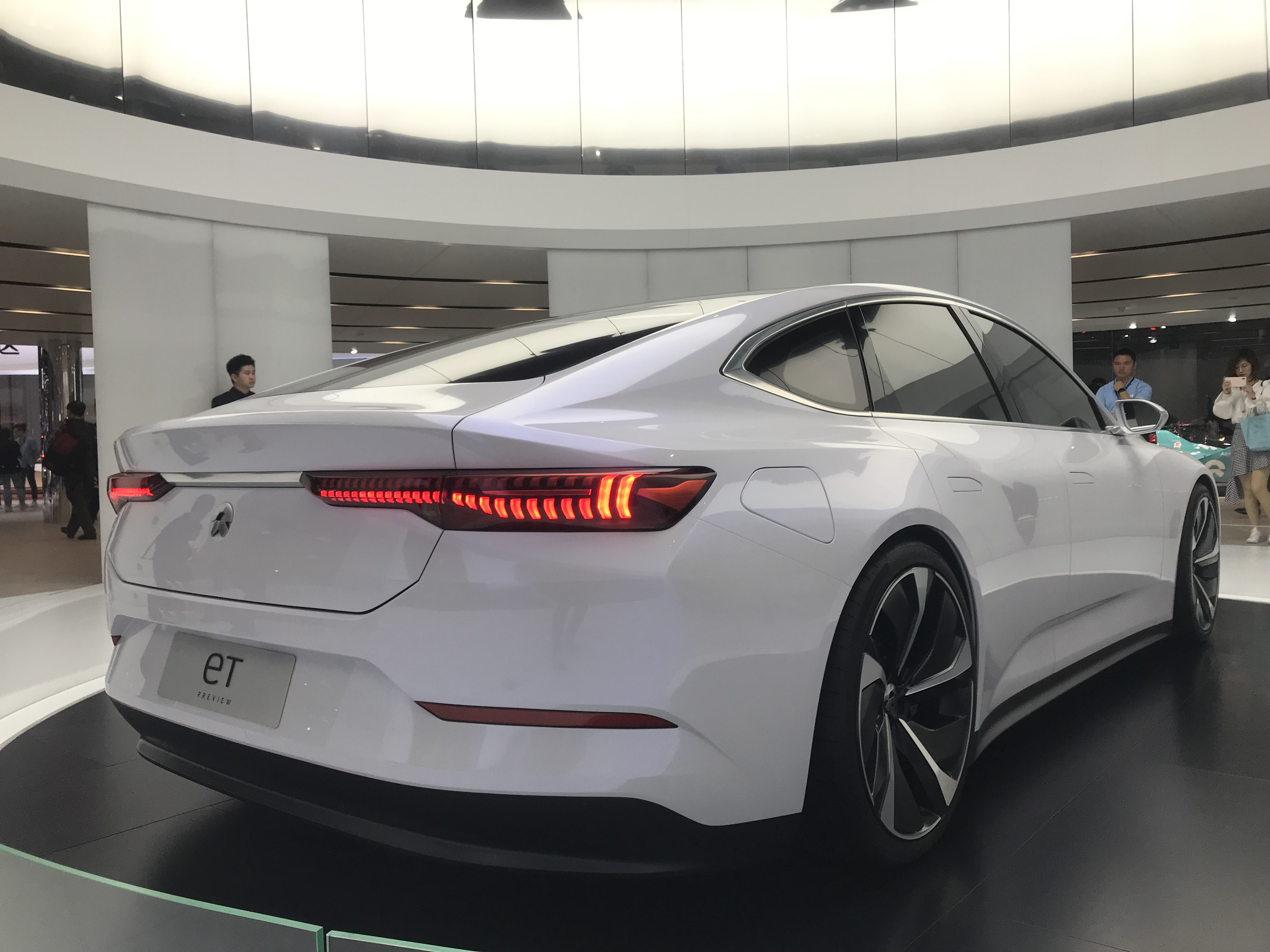
Nio ET Preview concept (rear)

=== Production model ===
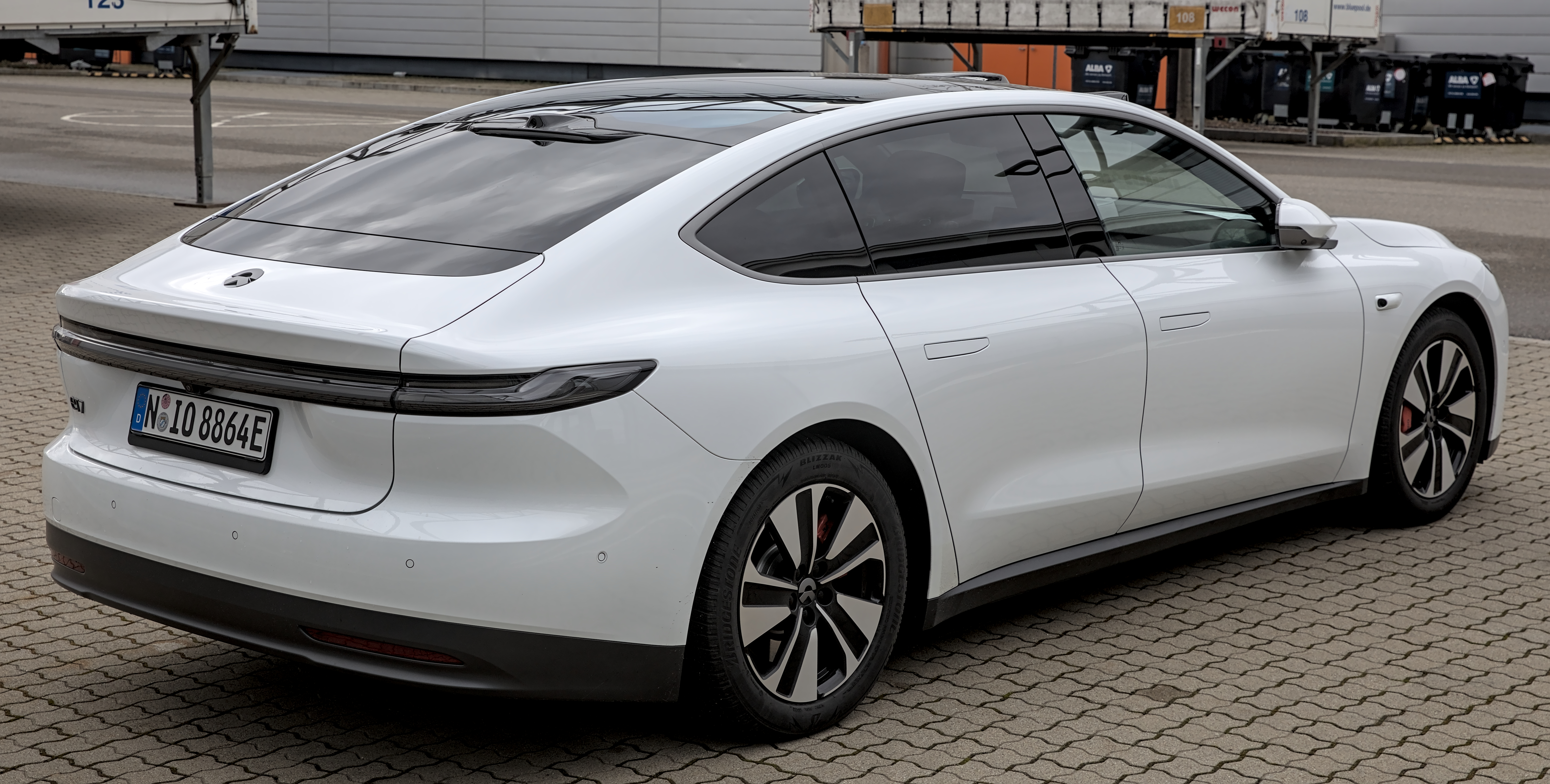
Rear view

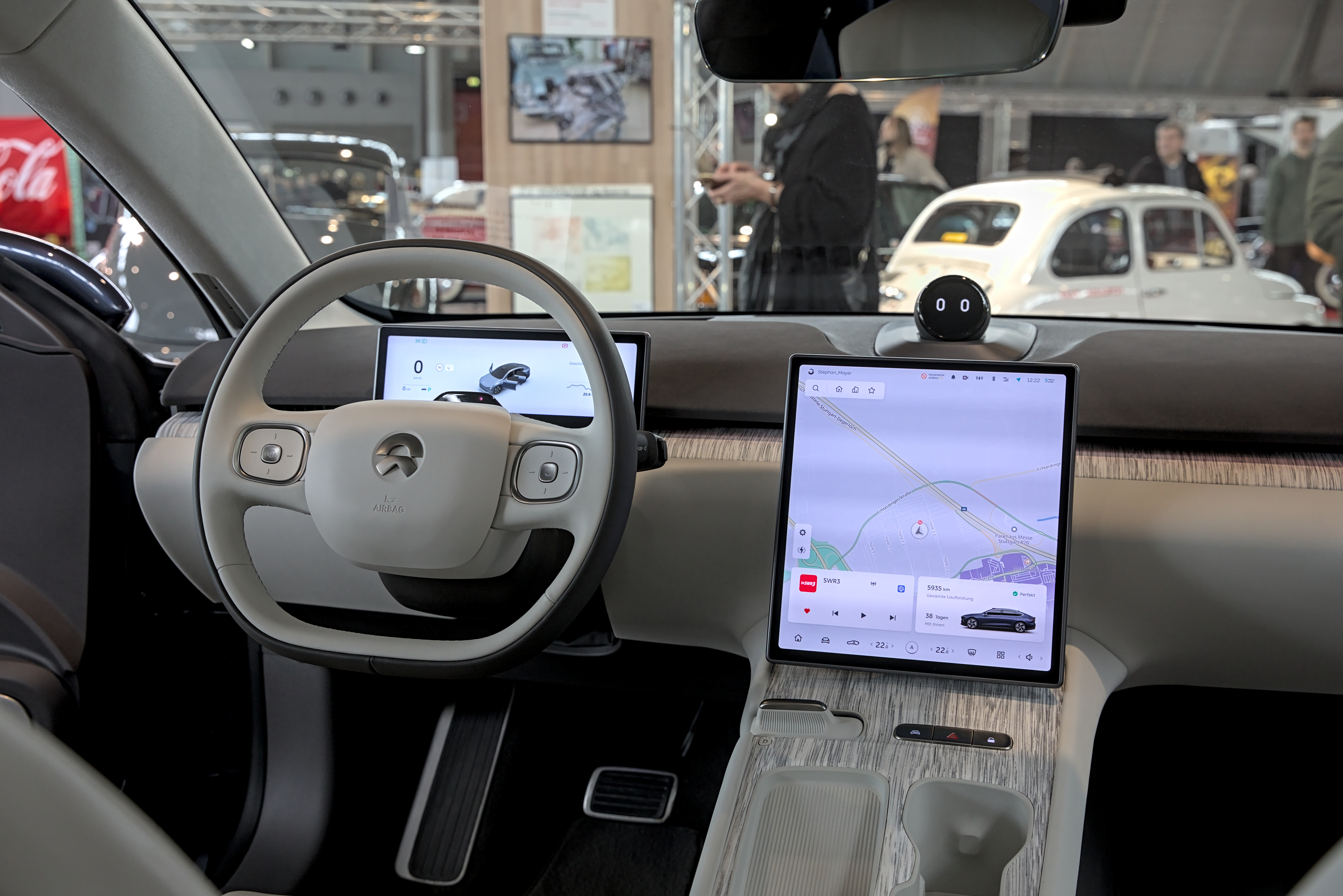
Interior

The Nio ET7 was unveiled in China on 9 January 2021 at the 'Nio Day' event in Chengdu, retaining many design cues of the 2019 Nio ET Preview concept car. It went on sale on March 28, 2022 in China, and it serves as a direct competitor to the Tesla Model S sedan in that market. In late 2021, Nio announced by Nio that ET7 will be sold in Germany in late 2022. The first European deliveries of the ET7 occurred in October 2022 in Germany and the Netherlands, with units for Denmark and Sweden arriving in November. It is produced under a contract manufacturing agreement with JAC Motors. On the 26th April 2022, Nio's 200,000th car was produced and it was an ET7.

The interior of the ET7 features the NOMI animatronic AI assistant mounted on top of the dashboard, a 260 mm (10.2 in) electronic instrument cluster display, a 330 mm (12.8 in) centre touchscreen infotainment system, and a 23-speaker audio system with a 1000-watt output. The ET7 comes with third-generation Qualcomm Snapdragon Automotive Cockpit Platform for in-car mobile connectivity and communication including 5G, NFC and Bluetooth 5.2. The ET7 will be first production car to feature Karuun, a sustainable rattan material. The ET7 also features 256 colour interior ambient lighting, soft close doors with frameless windows, and intelligent fragrance system.

=== 2024 refresh ===
On April 16, 2024, pre-orders opened for the 2024 ET7 with a deposit of CN¥ 5,000 (approximately US$690). On April 25, the refreshed Nio ET7 was officially launched at the 2024 Beijing Auto Show, with deliveries beginning on April 30. Pricing remained similar to previous years in spite of increased competition and a pricing war in the industry; models equipped with the 100 kWh battery saw a CN¥ 10,000 (approximately US$1,400) price increase.

Exterior changes are minimal, with a new silver paint color and new 21-inch wheel options and all dimensions remaining the same. Most changes were made to the interior, especially in the second row where the new ET7 now uses aviation-style executive seats based on Nio’s self-developed seat frame. They feature a total of 14-way electric adjustment including headrest, front and rear movement, backrest angle, seat cushion angle and other adjustments. There are also two 14.5-inch 3K OLED entertainment displays mounted to the front seatbacks for use by rear passengers. A new sound system has a peak power of 2230 W, and there are more soft touch materials throughout the cabin.

The ET7's computing systems have also been upgraded, with it now consisting of a Qualcomm Snapdragon 8295 SoC accompanied with four Nvidia Orin X chips, called ADAM. Nio claims a twofold increase in CPU performance, triple GPU performance, and eight times increase in NPU performance. The NOMI AI assistant has been updated to use GPT models that are run locally, without the need for an internet connection, increasing data privacy.

The powertrain remains unchanged, with the option of 75, 100 or 150 kWh batteries, with the latter featuring a semi-solid-state electrolyte and is only available in the battery as a service (BaaS) subscription model; power output remains at 480 kW; 653 PS (644 hp).

== Specifications ==
In every configuration, the ET7 has electric motors on each axle in a dual-motor all-wheel-drive setup. The front axle is powered by a permanent magnet synchronous AC motor making 180 kW (240 hp; 240 PS) and 350 N⋅m (260 lb⋅ft) of torque. The rear is powered by an induction AC motor which produces 300 kW (400 hp; 410 PS) and 500 N⋅m (370 lb⋅ft) of torque. The combined output is 480 kW (640 hp; 650 PS) and 850 N⋅m (630 lb⋅ft) of torque. The 0 to 100 km/h (0 to 62 mph) acceleration time is 3.8 seconds, the top speed is 200 kilometres per hour (124 mph), the braking distance from 100 to 0 km/h (62 to 0 mph) is 33.5 m (109.9 ft), and the drag coefficient is 0.208. The 75 kWh model's weight starts at 2,359 kilograms (5,201 lb), and all models have a 49.5:50.5 weight distribution and a gross vehicle weight rating of 2,900 kilograms (6,400 lb).

Motor specifications
	Motor type	Power		Torque	
	Motor type	Peak	Sustained	Peak	Sustained
Front	TZ180S001 Permanent magnet synchronous AC	180 kW (240 hp; 240 PS)	70 kW (94 hp; 95 PS)	350 N⋅m (260 lb⋅ft)	150 N⋅m (110 lb⋅ft)
Rear	YS300S001 Three-phase induction AC	300 kW (400 hp; 410 PS)	60 kW (80 hp; 82 PS)	500 N⋅m (370 lb⋅ft)	120 N⋅m (89 lb⋅ft)
Total	–	480 kW (640 hp; 650 PS)	130 kW (170 hp; 180 PS)	850 N⋅m (630 lb⋅ft)	270 N⋅m (200 lb⋅ft)

== Battery packs ==
The Nio ET7 is sold with two purchasable battery options, a standard range pack and long range pack. Initially, the standard range pack was to be a 70 kWh NMC battery produced by CATL, with 500 km (311 mi) of CLTC range. Later, it was replaced by a new 75 kWh LFP-NMC dual chemistry battery with peak range of 550 km (342 mi) revealed before ET7 production began. It consists of an undisclosed ratio of serially connected LFP and NMC battery cells assembled in a cell-to-pack format and a special pack management system, and it allows for a blend of each chemistries advantages: the higher energy density, better cold weather charging, and accurate state-of-charge readings from NMC cells, and the lower costs, lower wear, and improved safety from LFP cells.

For the 2024 facelift, the standard range battery was once again changed, this time to a fully LFP cell-to-pack battery, which also features an increased peak DC fast charging rate of 170 kW compared to the previous pack's 140 kW rate.

The long range battery is a 100 kWh NMC pack sourced from either CATL or CALB with a cell-to-pack design, allowing for up to 705 kilometres (438 mi) of range.

In mid-2024, a 150 kWh semi-solid state NMC battery was introduced, allowing for an NEDC range of 1,050 kilometres (652 mi). It is the first ever mass produced automotive traction battery to use semi-solid state electrolyte technology, and is supplied by WeLion. The semi-solid state technology allows it to have a 50% higher capacity with only a 20-kilogram (44 lb) weight increase over the 555 kg (1,224 lb) 100 kWh pack, while maintaining the same size. It is initially available only as a short-term rental from a battery swap station, but it is planned to be available for purchase later. At its reveal in February 2024, Nio said that each pack costs the company as much as an entire ET5 at launch, which has a starting price of CN¥ 328,000, or CN¥ 258,000 (approximately US$48,000, or US$38,000) with a battery subscription.

Battery specifications
Battery	Voltage	Pack weight	Range (CLTC)	Range (WLTP)	Peak charge rate	10-80% charge time
70 kWh NMC CATL	350 V	525 kg (1,157 lb)	500 km (310 mi)	–	90kw	–
75 kWh LFP-NMC hybrid CATL	386 V	535 kg (1,179 lb)	550 km (340 mi)	445 km (277 mi)	140kw	30min
75 kWh LFP CATL	367 V	535 kg (1,179 lb)	535 km (332 mi)	445 km (277 mi)	170kw	27min
100 kWh NMC CATL/CALB	358 V	555 kg (1,224 lb)	705 km (438 mi)	580 km (360 mi)	127kw	40min
150 kWh NMC WeLion	337 V	575 kg (1,268 lb)	1,050 km (650 mi)	–	–	–

== Autonomous driving system ==
The autonomous driving system in the Nio ET7 is called Aquila, which uses 33 sensors, including seven 8 MP high-definition cameras, four 3 MP surround-view cameras, a high-resolution LIDAR with a 500 m (1,640.4 ft) range, 5 millimeter-wave radars, 12 ultrasonic radars, and 2 high-precision positioning units. The Aquila autonomous driving system generates 8 gigabytes of data per second which is analysed by an onboard computer called Adam.

== Aerodynamics ==
The aerodynamics of the Nio ET7 was one of the primary focus areas during the development of the vehicle. Extreme work and effort was dedicated to making sure that the car achieved an extremely low aerodynamics drag coefficient in order to enhance the vehicle's driving range and performance. On September 20, 2021 the Nio ET7 was tested at CAERI Wind tunnel Testing Centre in Chongqing, China and achieved a certified drag coefficient of 0.208.

== Awards ==
In 2022, the ET7 received the Golden Steering Wheel award in the Medium and Upper Class category. It was given the Car of the Year 2022 award by the Swedish magazine auto motor und sport Sverige, and also won in the luxury class. A 2023 75 kWh model received a 'B' rating from the China Consumer Research and Testing Center.

== Safety ==
Euro NCAP test results Nio ET7 (LHD) (2022)
Test	Points	%
Overall:	5 /5 stars	
Adult occupant:	34.8	91%
Child occupant:	43	87%
Pedestrian:	39.5	73%
Safety assist:	15.2	95%

C-NCAP (2021) test results 2022 Nio ET7 75 kWh
Category		%
Overall:	5 /5 stars	87.3%
Occupant protection:		88.18%
Vulnerable road users:		77.15%
Active safety:		91.44%

== Sales ==
Year	China
2021	68
2022	23,046
2023	5,643
2024	7,244
2025	3,099
