= China Railways ET7 =

Class of Chinese steam locomotives

ET7
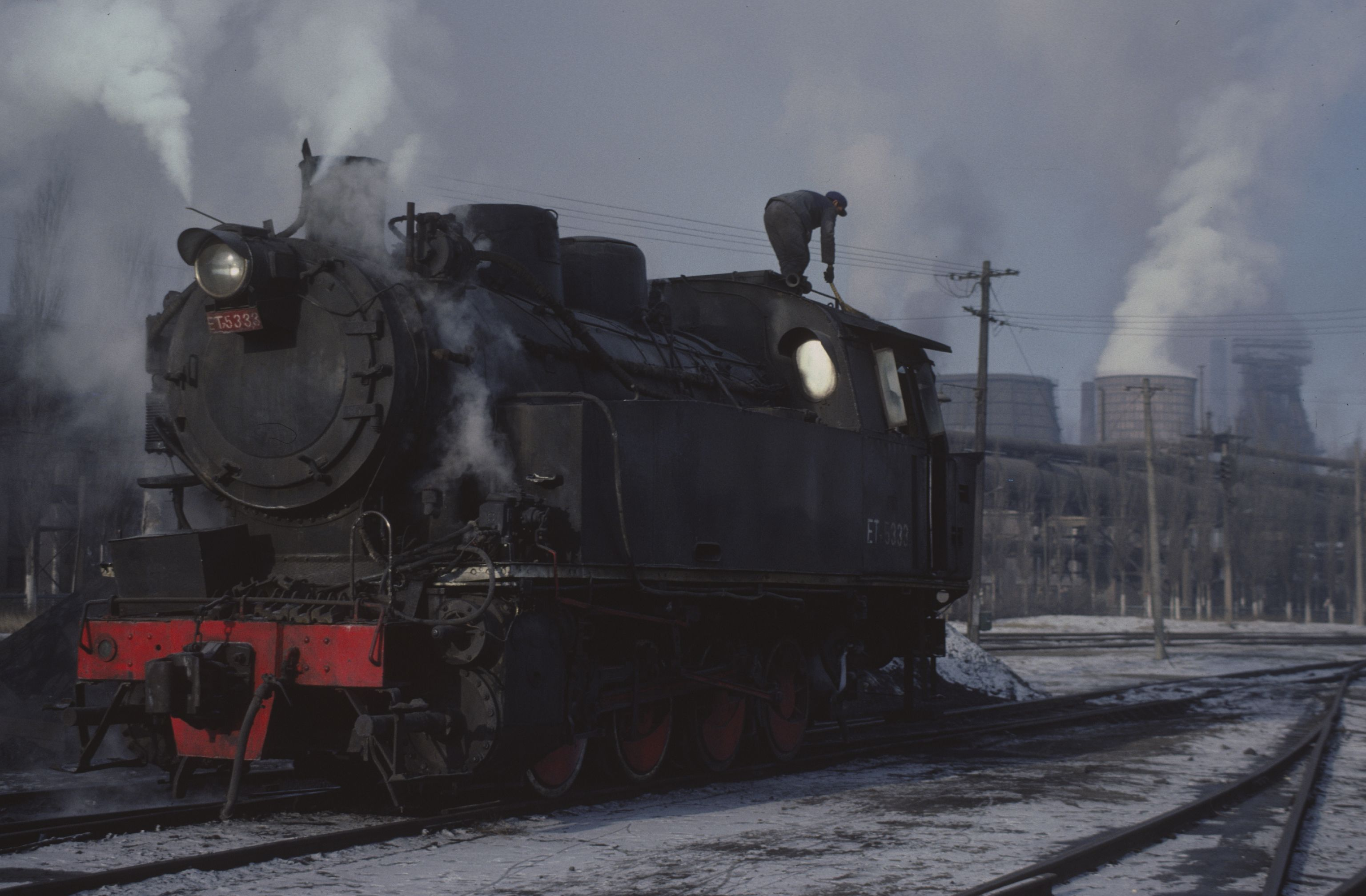
- ET7-5333 in Baotou
Type and origin
- Power type: Steam
- Builder: Fablok
- Build date: 1959−1961
- Total produced: 90
Specifications
- Configuration
  - Whyte: 0-8-0T
- Gauge: 1,435 mm (4 ft 8 1/2 in)
- Driver dia.: 1,100 mm (43.31 in)
- Width: 11 m (36.09 ft)
- Loco weight: 66 t (65.0 long tons; 72.8 short tons)
- Fuel type: Coal
- Cylinders: Two, outside
- Valve gear: Walschaerts
Performance figures
- Maximum speed: 40 km/h (25 mph)
Career
- Operators: China Railway
- Delivered: 1959
- First run: 1959
- Last run: 1990s
- Preserved: 1
- Disposition: 1 preserved, remainder scrapped

The China Railways ET7 class of locomotives were a series of 90 0-8-0T "Eight-coupled" type steam locomotives for industrial use built by Fablok of Poland.

== History ==
90 locomotives were built and exported to China between 1959 and 1961 for use on industrial sites, including steelworks. Many units were still in work in the 1980s and some of the machines remained in use until the 1990s.

ET7−5333 is preserved at the Baotou Museum.
