= Semi-solid-state battery =

Type of rechargeable battery

A semi-solid-state battery (also formally known as a quasi-solid-state battery, QSSB) is a type of rechargeable battery that serves as an intermediate technology between conventional lithium-ion batteries (LIB) with liquid electrolytes and all-solid-state batteries (ASSB) using a hybrid solid-liquid semi-solid-state electrolyte.

The primary goal of this technology is to improve battery safety by reducing the amount of flammable liquid electrolyte, thereby mitigating the risk of fire and dendrite growth associated with traditional LIBs. At the same time, it aims to overcome the significant challenges facing the ASSBs, such as high interfacial resistance and poor contact between the solid electrolyte and the electrodes. As of 2023, commercially available batteries marketed as "solid-state" were in fact quasi-solid-state batteries.

== Rationale ==
The development of semi-solid-state batteries is driven by the distinct limitations of both liquid and all-solid-state electrolytes.

- Liquid Electrolyte Batteries (LEBs): Conventional LIBs rely on organic liquid electrolytes that are highly flammable, posing a significant safety risk of fire and explosion. They are also susceptible to the formation and growth of lithium dendrites on the anode during charging, which can pierce the separator and cause an internal short circuit.
- All-Solid-State Batteries: While ASSBs eliminate the flammable liquid and can physically suppress dendrite growth, they suffer from critical performance issues. The rigid nature of solid electrolytes leads to poor physical contact with the electrodes, creating a high impedance at the interface. This interfacial impedance severely restricts ion flow, limiting the battery's power output and cycling performance.

Semi-solid-state batteries are designed as a compromise to balance these factors. By using a small amount of liquid or a gel-like substance within a solid matrix, they maintain good interfacial contact and high ionic conductivity while significantly improving safety compared to traditional LIBs.

== Types ==
The core of a semi-solid-state battery is the semi-solid-state electrolyte, which is typically a gel polymer electrolyte (GPE). A GPE consists of a solid polymer matrix that traps a liquid component (a plasticizer, such as a conventional liquid electrolyte). This structure provides the mechanical stability of a solid while retaining the high ionic conductivity of a liquid. The properties of the GPE are largely determined by the choice of polymer matrix.

=== Polymer matrices ===
- Poly(ethylene oxide) (PEO)-based: PEO is a widely studied polymer due to its strong ability to dissolve lithium salts. However, its high crystallinity can lead to low ionic conductivity at room temperature, and it has poor electrochemical stability above 4.0 V.
- Polyvinylidene fluoride (PVDF)-based: PVDF and its copolymer, poly(vinylidene fluoride-co-hexafluoropropylene) (PVDF-HFP), offer high mechanical strength, good chemical stability, and a wide electrochemical window (up to 5.0 V), making them suitable for high-voltage batteries. Strategies to reduce PVDF's crystallinity, such as blending or adding fillers, are often used to improve ionic conductivity.
- Poly(ionic liquid) (PIL)-based: These polymers incorporate ionic liquid moieties into their structure. This design leverages the properties of ionic liquids, such as extremely low volatility and high electrochemical stability, to create safer and more stable GPEs.
- Single-ion conductors (SICs): In a conventional electrolyte, both cations (Li⁺) and anions move freely. In a SIC, the anions are covalently bonded to the polymer backbone. This restricts anion movement and allows only Li⁺ ions to travel, resulting in a high Li⁺ transference number (approaching 1.0). This minimizes concentration polarization and is highly effective at suppressing dendrite growth.
- The cells were also developed based on polyacrylonitrile (PAN)-, poly(methyl methacrylate) (PMMA)-, polysilicon-, and polycarbonate-based matrices.

=== Composite electrolytes ===
Another common approach is to create a composite electrolyte by dispersing inorganic ceramic fillers (such as LLZO, SiO₂, or BaTiO₃) into a polymer matrix. These ceramic fillers can enhance ionic conductivity and improve the mechanical and thermal stability of the electrolyte. This design also prevents the direct and often reactive contact between the ceramic material and the electrodes.

== Preparation methods ==
The fabrication method for the gel polymer electrolyte is critical to the battery's final performance, particularly its interfacial resistance.

=== Ex-situ preparation ===
In the ex-situ method, a free-standing polymer membrane is prepared first through techniques like solution-casting or electrospinning. This membrane is then placed inside the battery cell during assembly and swollen with a liquid electrolyte to form the GPE. A significant drawback of this method is the potential for poor physical contact between the pre-formed membrane and the electrodes, which can result in high interfacial resistance.

=== In-situ preparation ===
The in-situ method involves injecting a liquid precursor—a mixture of monomers, a lithium salt, and an initiator—directly into the assembled battery cell. The liquid fully penetrates the pores of the electrodes and then undergoes polymerization (triggered by heat or UV light) to form the GPE in place. This process creates an intimate and seamless interface between the electrolyte and the electrodes, significantly lowering interfacial resistance and improving overall battery performance. This method is considered more conducive to commercialization as it aligns well with existing battery manufacturing processes.

== Safety ==
While semi-solid-state batteries are significantly safer than conventional liquid-electrolyte batteries, they are not inherently immune to failure. The presence of even a small amount of liquid or gel plasticizer means that they still contain a flammable component.

Comparative safety tests have shown that under external heating, QSSBs can still undergo thermal runaway, though the reaction may be initiated at a higher temperature and be slightly less energetic than in a traditional LIB. For failures caused by an internal short circuit (e.g., from dendrite penetration), the heat released can be comparable to that of a liquid-electrolyte battery. Therefore, while safety is enhanced, it is not absolute, and thermal management and battery protection systems remain crucial.

== See also ==
- Solid-state battery
- Lithium-ion battery
- Polymer electrolyte
- Solid-state electrolyte

== Sources ==
- Han, Changxing; Shui, Xiong; Chen, Guansheng; Xu, Gaojie; Ma, Jun; Dong, Shanmu; Wang, Shitao; Zhou, Xinhong; Cui, Zili; Qiao, Lixin; Cui, Guanglei (August 2024). "Recent progress in gel polymer electrolyte for lithium metal batteries". Giant. 19 100337. doi:10.1016/j.giant.2024.100337.
- Manthiram, Arumugam; Yu, Xingwen; Wang, Sheng (November 2019). "Building Better Batteries in the Solid State: A Review". Materials. 12 (23): 3892. Bibcode:2019Mate...12.3892M. doi:10.3390/ma12233892. PMC 6926585.
- Zhao, Zhaoyang; Hu, Haitao; He, Zhengyou; Zhu, Hongyi; Davari, Pooya; Blaabjerg, Frede (December 2023). "Advanced Solid-State Lithium Battery and Its Safety". CPSS Transactions on Power Electronics and Applications. 8 (4): 348–362. doi:10.24295/CPSSTPEA.2023.00027.
