= ES6 (disambiguation) =

ES6 or eS6 may refer to:

- ES6, the 6th edition of ECMAScript (a specification that includes JavaScript)
- ES6, the 6th Elder Scrolls series video game developed by Bethesda Game Studios
- Nio ES6, a battery electric mid-size luxury crossover SUV
- eS6, ribosomal protein S6
