= Nio EC6 =

Chinese sport utility vehicle

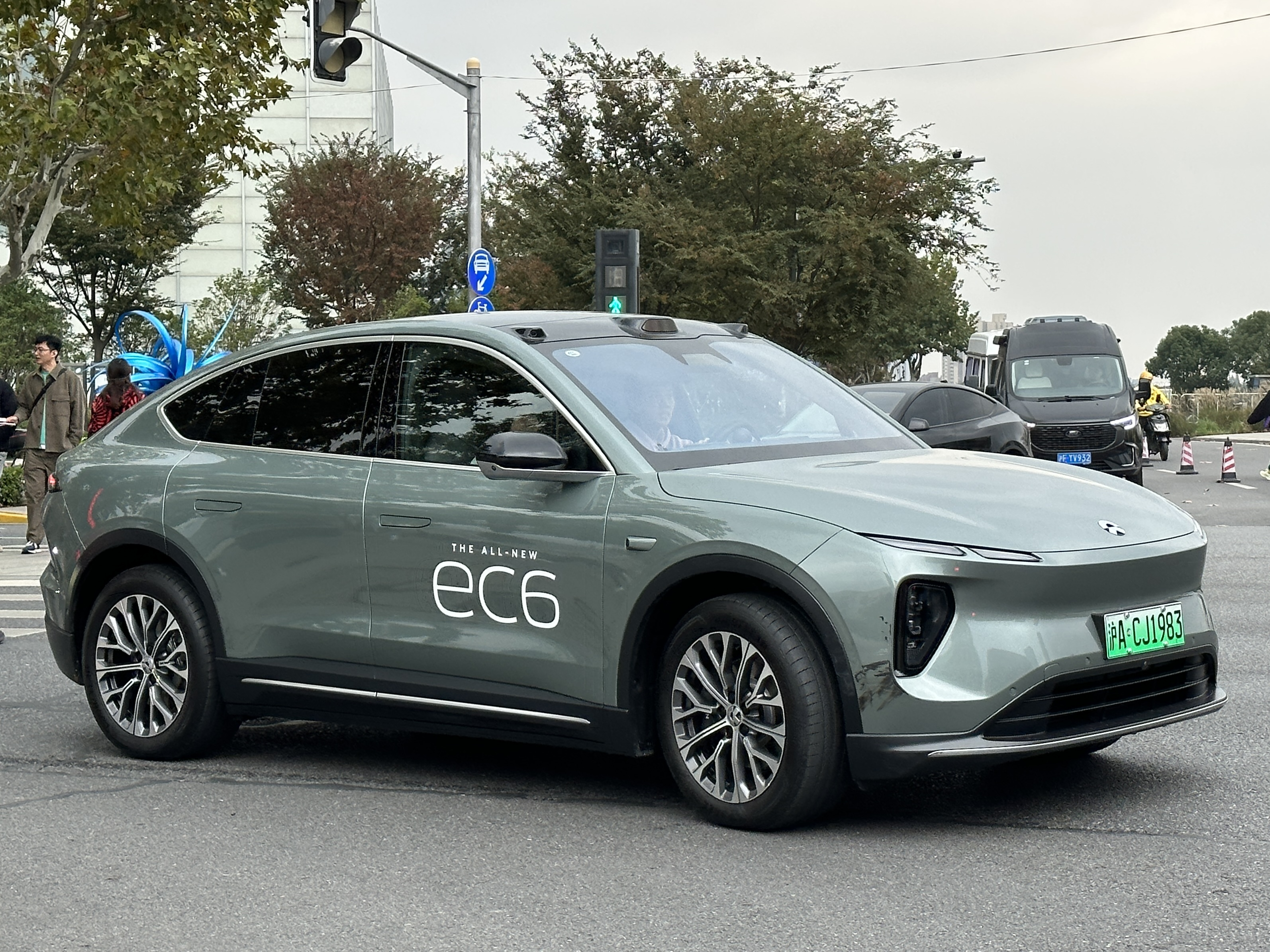

Overview
- Manufacturer: Nio Inc.
- Production: 2020–present

Body and chassis
- Class: Mid-size luxury crossover SUV
- Body style: 5-door coupe SUV

The Nio EC6 is a battery electric mid-size luxury crossover SUV manufactured by Chinese electric car company Nio. It was announced in 2019 and has been on sale since 2020.

== First generation (2020–2023) ==
First generation
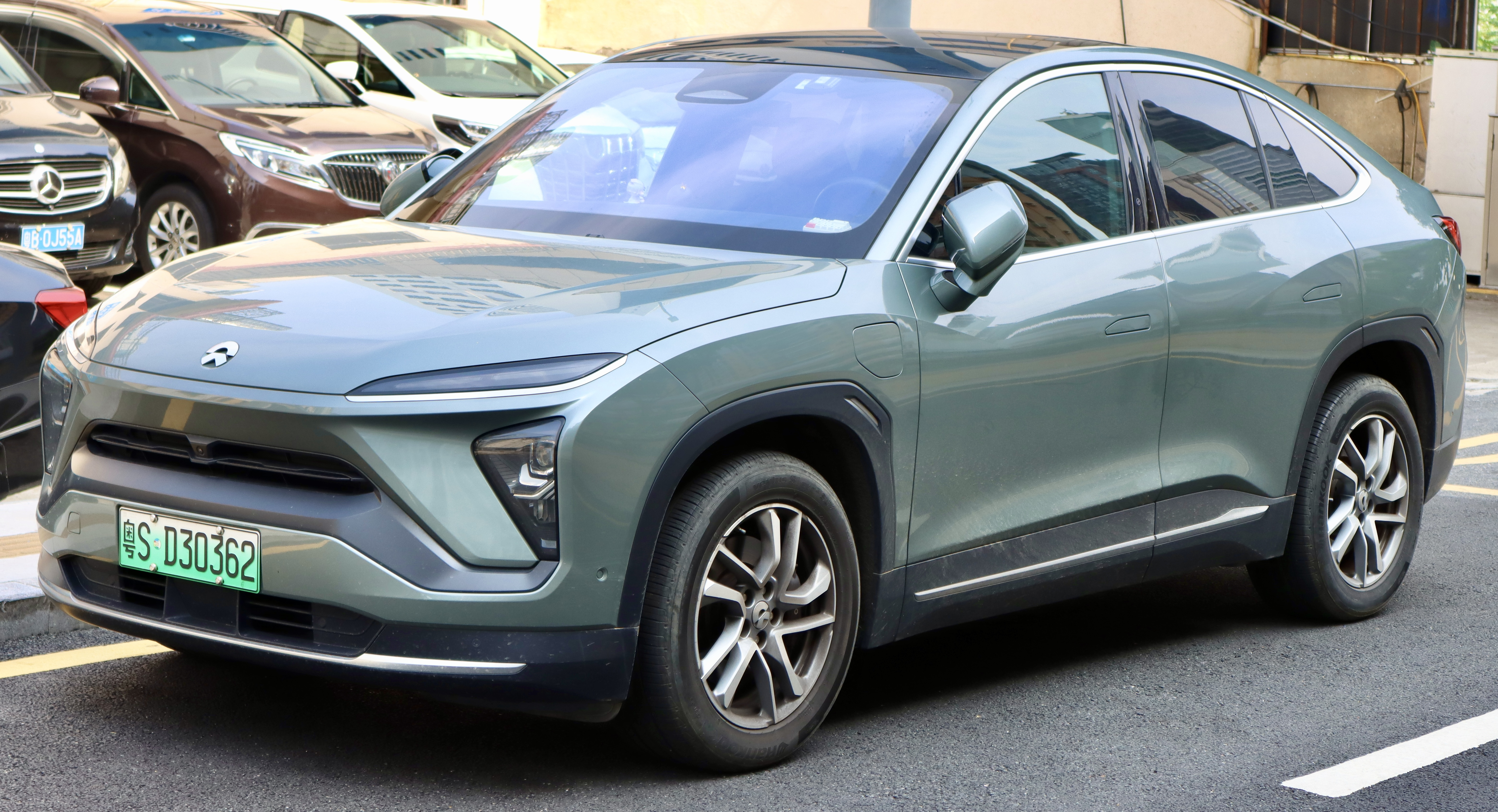

Overview
- Production: 2020–2023
- Assembly: China: Hefei, Anhui

Body and chassis
- Class: Mid-size luxury crossover SUV
- Body style: 5-door coupe SUV
- Layout: Dual motor 4WD
- Related: Nio ES6

Powertrain
- Electric motor: AC induction/asynchronous, Permanent magnet motor
- Transmission: 1-speed direct-drive reduction
- Battery: 100 kWh Li-ion; 70 kWh Li-ion
- Electric range: 615km (NEDC)

Dimensions
- Wheelbase: 2,900 mm (114.2 in)
- Length: 4,850 mm (190.9 in)
- Width: 1,965 mm (77.4 in)
- Height: 1,758 mm (69.2 in)

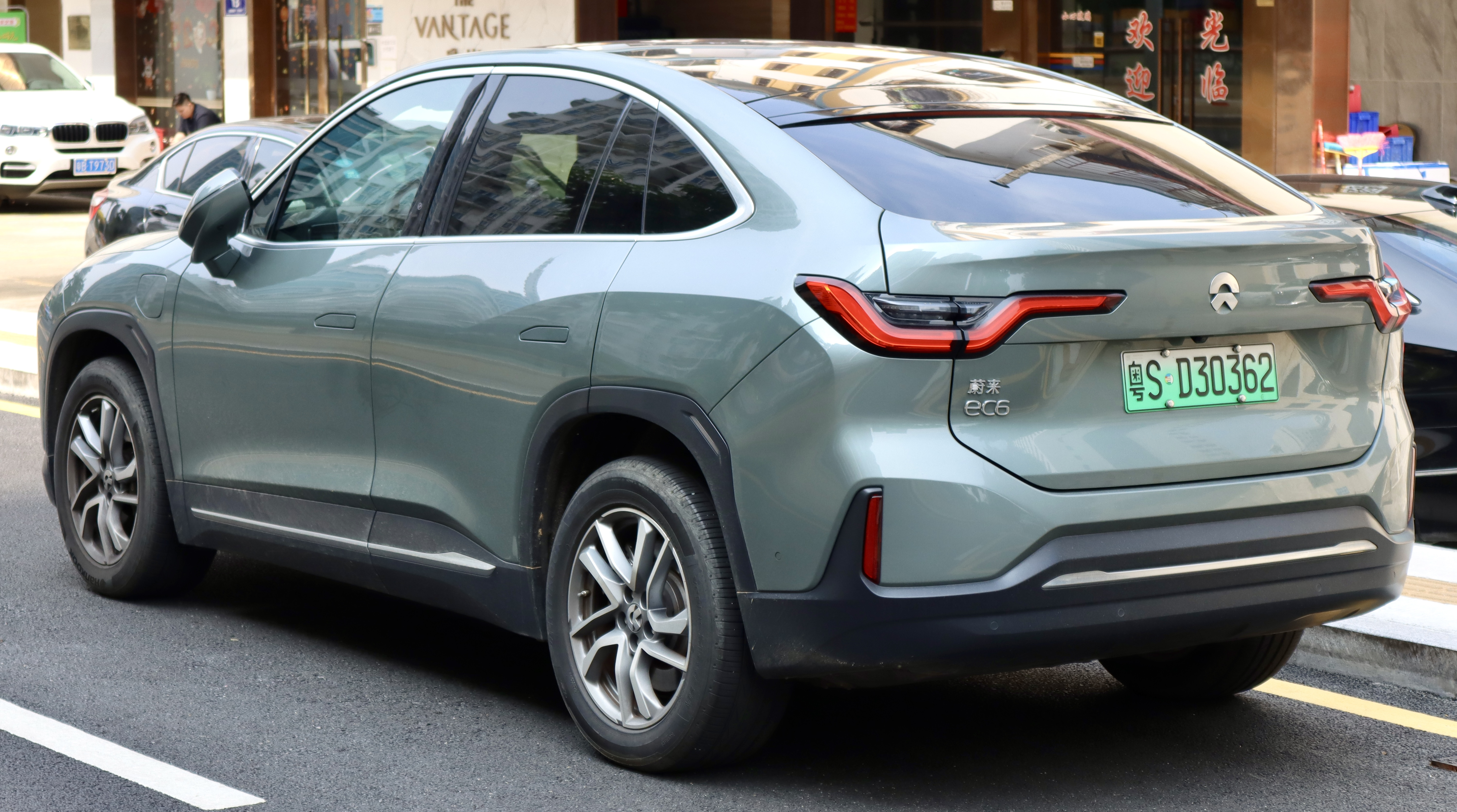
Rear view

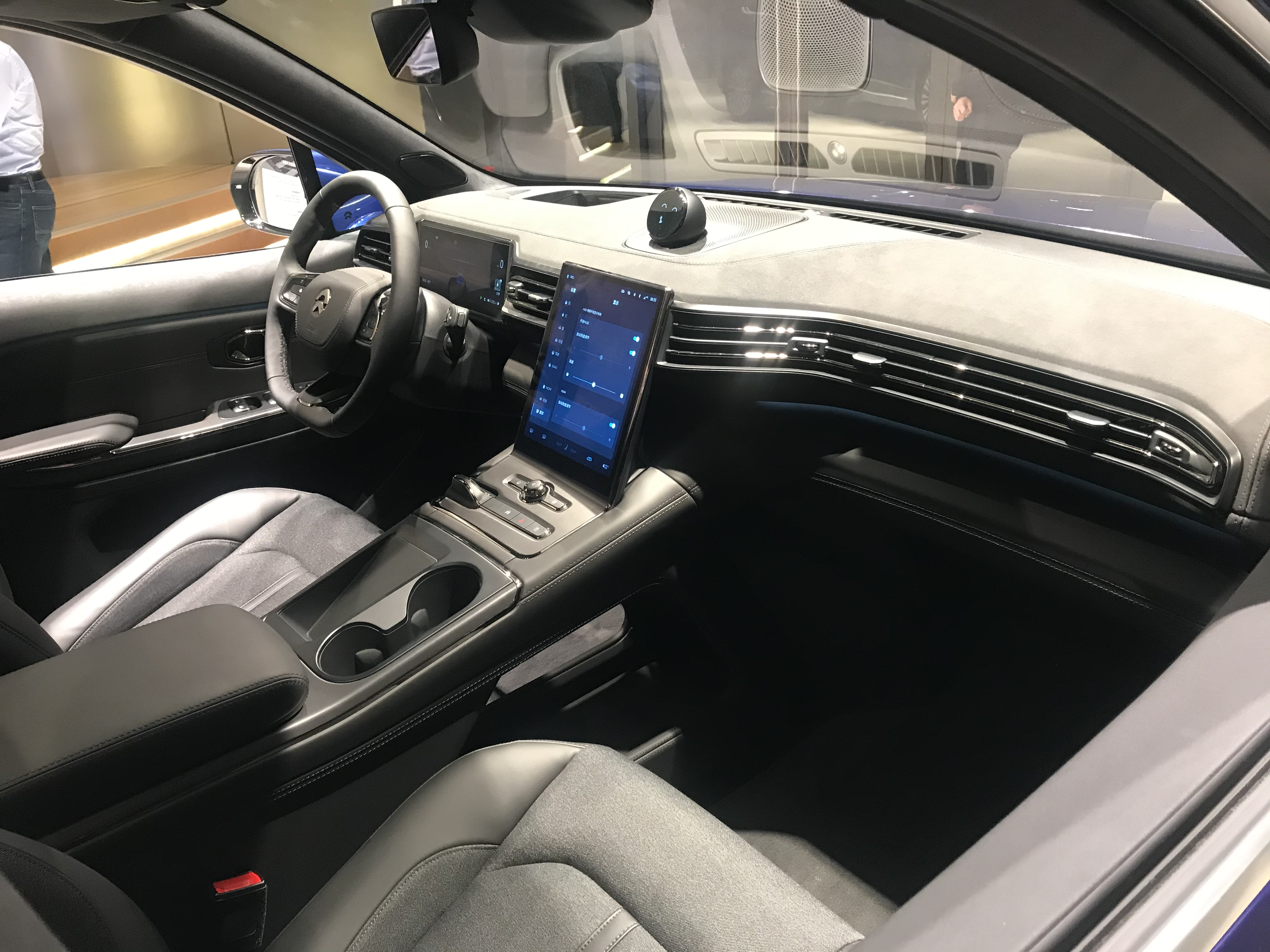
Interior

The EC6 is a 5-door, 5-seater crossover SUV with a sporting roofline. It is a "crossover coupe" counterpart to the more boxy ES6. The car is offered with an option for a 100-kWh battery, available for all current Nio models. The EC6 is powered by a lithium-ion battery pack, which is swappable, just like the Nio ES8.

Since February 2020, the manufacturer has sold the EC6 in mainland China. It is manufactured under a contract by JAC in Anhui, China.

=== Specifications ===
The entry version generates 324 kW (435 hp), translating into a 0–100 km/h time of 5.4 seconds. This version uses permanent magnet motors in both the front and the rear.

The high-end version generates 406 kW (544 hp), translating into a 0–100 km/h time of 4.5 seconds. This version uses a 160 kW permanent magnet motor in the front and a 240 kW induction motor in the rear.

The EC6 is available with two lithium-ion battery pack options: 70 kWh or 100 kWh. The latter offers a range of 615 km NEDC.

Nio claims that the car comes with the largest panoramic sunroof "in its class". The car features active air suspension, NOMI AI personal assistant, Nappa leather and intelligent fragrance system.

== Second generation (2023) ==
Second generation
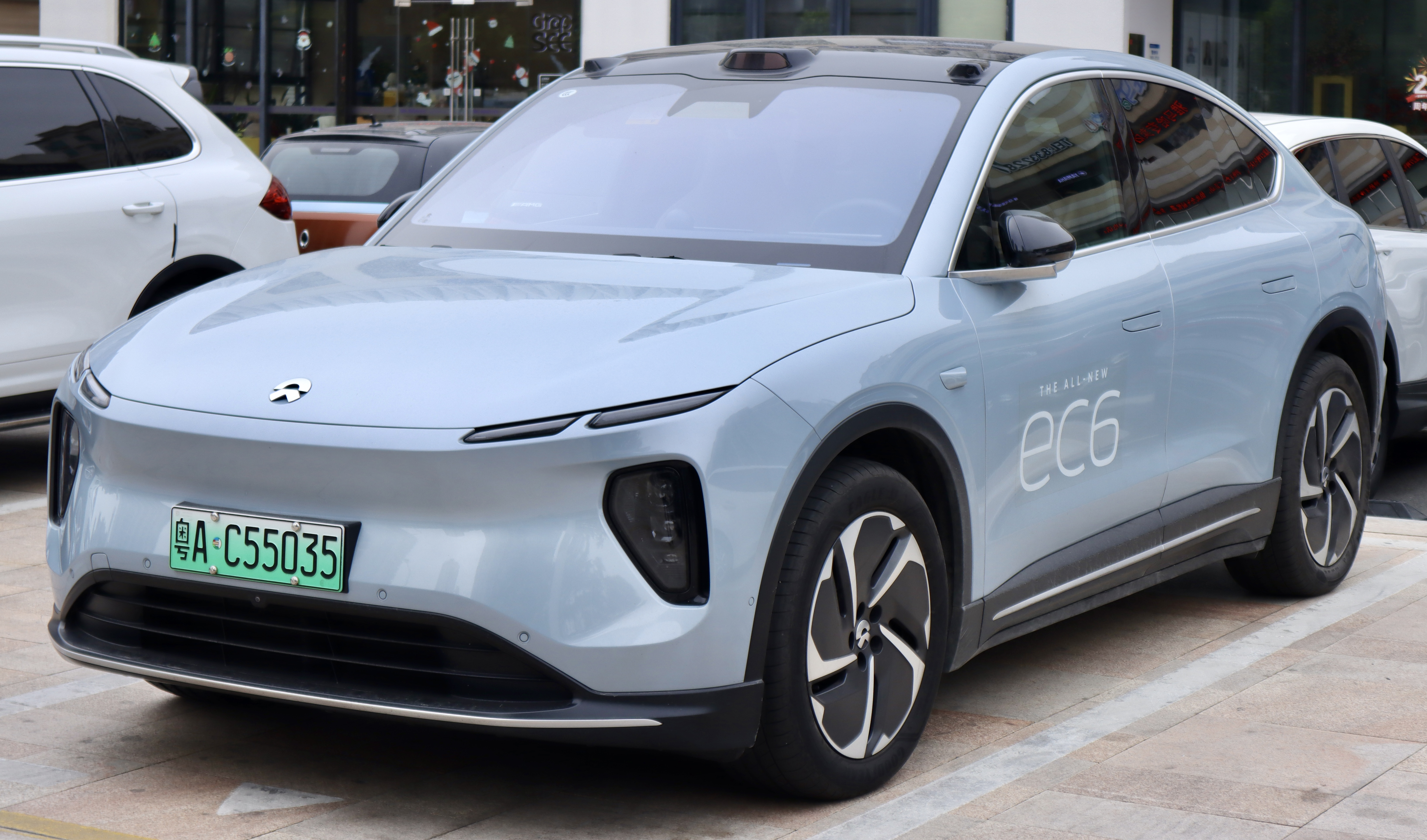

Overview
- Production: 2023–present
- Assembly: China: Hefei, Anhui

Body and chassis
- Class: Mid-size luxury crossover SUV
- Body style: 5-door coupe SUV
- Layout: Dual motor 4WD
- Related: Nio ES6

Powertrain
- Electric motor: AC induction/asynchronous, Permanent magnet motor
- Transmission: 1-speed direct-drive reduction
- Battery: 100 kWh Li-ion; 75 kWh Li-ion
- Electric range: 630km (NEDC); 495km (NEDC)

Dimensions
- Wheelbase: 2,915 mm (114.8 in)
- Length: 4,849 mm (190.9 in)
- Width: 1,995 mm (78.5 in)
- Height: 1,697 mm (66.8 in)
- Curb weight: 2,292–2,340 kg (5,053–5,159 lb)

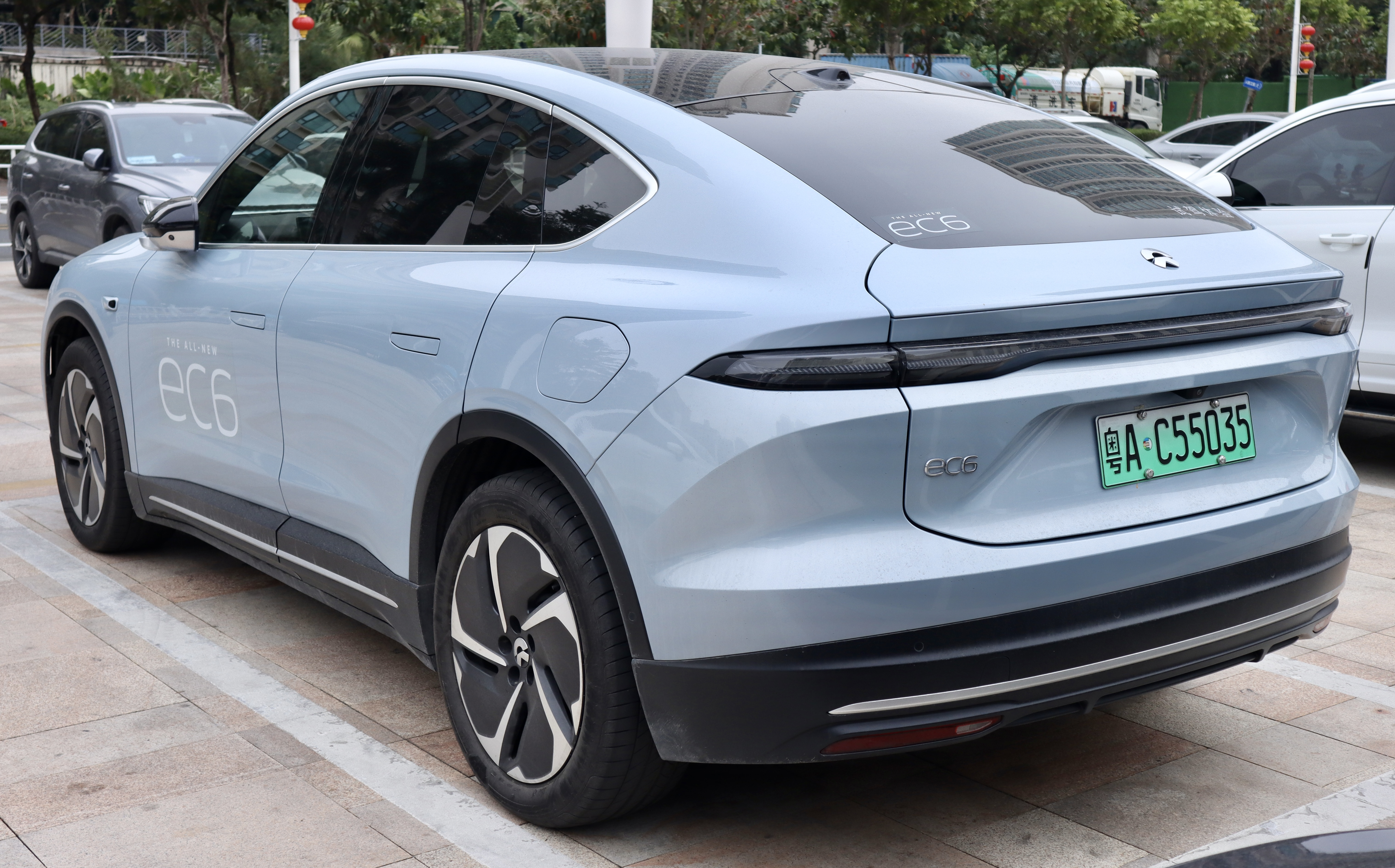
Rear view

The facelifted Nio EC6 was launched on September 15, 2023 and with deliveries beginning the following day. It is built with the next-generation NT 2.0 autonomous driving platform, along with a refreshed design and powertrain. It continues to be manufactured under a contract manufacturing agreement with JAC.

The exterior styling has been updated to closely match the EC7, including the grey lower body cladding with round wheel arches, rear tailgate and taillight units. It features a new front end with a revised bumper and hood with modified headlights, along with new mirrors. It is equipped with a LiDAR sensor and cameras mounted on the front of the roof on the center and corners, respectively. It also uses a more durable retractable door handle design. The body has a 0.24 C_{d} drag coefficient, and it features an active spoiler mounted behind the rear window.

The interior features the NOMI GPT assistant pod mounted on the top center of the dashboard. The passenger seat can now has a power extending footrest, allowing for a nearly flat "queen's seat" recline mode. The EC6 is equipped with a 1.77 m^{2} (19.1 sq ft) fixed panoramic sunroof.

=== 2025 facelift ===
Alongside the ET5, ET5T and ES6, the EC6 was given a refresh on May 10, 2025. Changes include a redesigned exterior and interior that matches the flagship ET9, with the notable inclusion of a 15.6-inch landscape-oriented AMOLED central infotainment system replacing the previous portrait setup, a 19.4-inch windshield head-up display (W-HUD) and aa 8-megapixel streaming rearview mirror.

== Specifications ==
The EC6 is compatible with Nio's battery swap system, and is thus capable of using any of Nio's swap capable battery packs found in the network. It is sold with either a 75 kWh or 100 kWh battery pack, yielding a CLTC range rating of up to 505 and 630 km (314 and 391 mi) respectively.

The sole powertrain option consists of a front AC induction motor outputting 150 kW (201 hp; 204 PS) and 280 N⋅m (207 lb⋅ft) of torque, and a rear permanent magnet synchronous motor outputting 210 kW (282 hp; 286 PS) and 420 N⋅m (310 lb⋅ft) of torque, which have a combined output of 360 kW (483 hp; 489 PS) and 700 N⋅m (516 lb⋅ft) of torque.

It has a top speed of 200 kilometres per hour (124 mph), and a 0–100 km/h (62 mph) time of 4.4 seconds.

Powertrain
Battery	Power			Torque			Range	Kerb Weight
Battery	Front	Rear	Total	Front	Rear	Total	Range	Kerb Weight
75 kWh	150 kW (200 hp; 200 PS)	210 kW (280 hp; 290 PS)	360 kW (480 hp; 490 PS)	280 N⋅m (210 lb⋅ft)	420 N⋅m (310 lb⋅ft)	700 N⋅m (520 lb⋅ft)	505 km (314 mi)	2,292 kg (5,053 lb)
100 kWh	150 kW (200 hp; 200 PS)	210 kW (280 hp; 290 PS)	360 kW (480 hp; 490 PS)	280 N⋅m (210 lb⋅ft)	420 N⋅m (310 lb⋅ft)	700 N⋅m (520 lb⋅ft)	630 km (390 mi)	2,340 kg (5,160 lb)

== Sales ==
Year	China
2020	5,367
2021	30,121
2022	17,076
2023	11,324
2024	27,226
2025	17,657
