= Nio ES6 =

Battery electric mid-size luxury crossover SUV

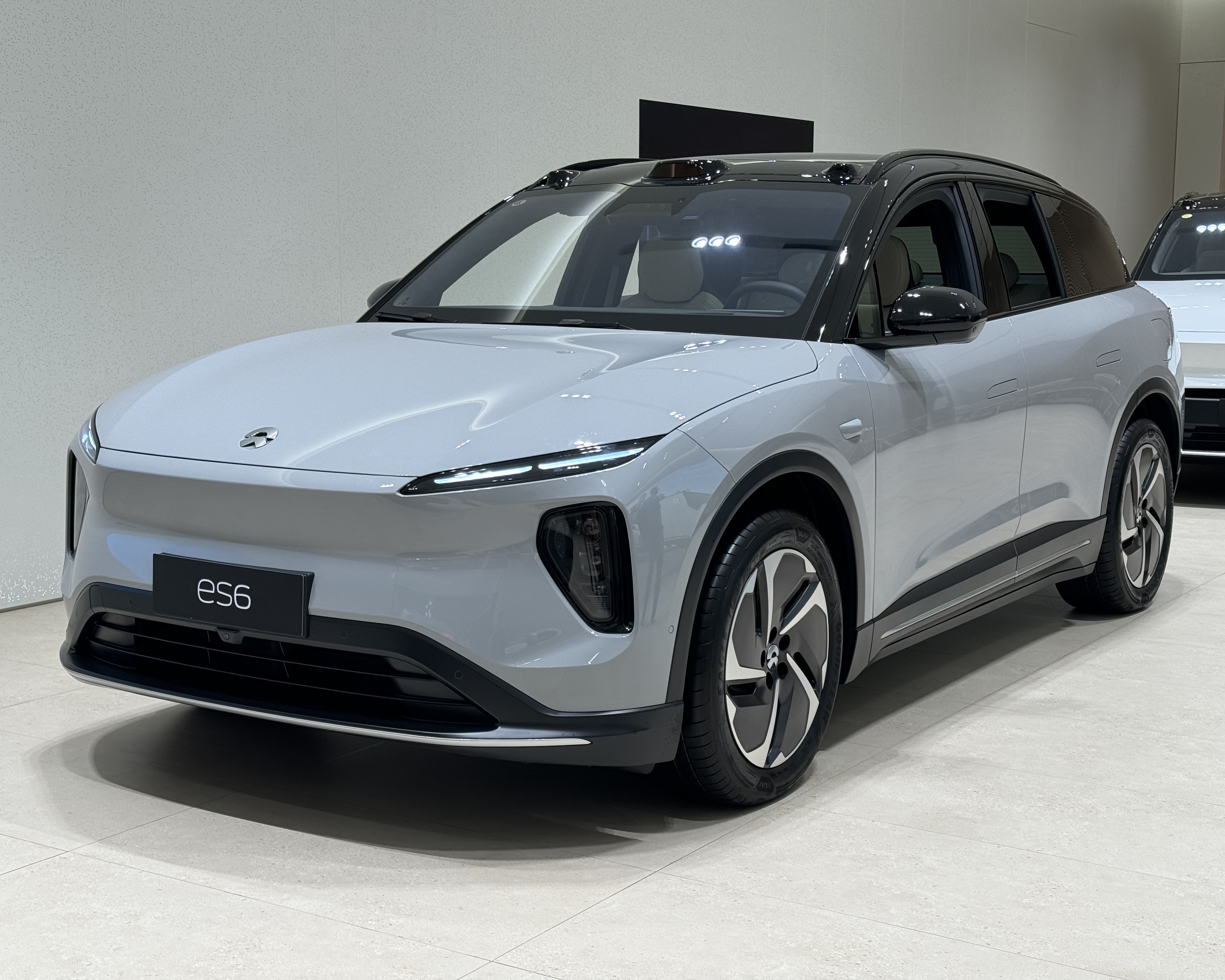

Overview
- Manufacturer: Nio Inc.
- Production: 2019–present

Body and chassis
- Class: Mid-size luxury crossover SUV
- Body style: 5-door SUV

The Nio ES6 is a battery electric mid-size luxury crossover SUV manufactured by Chinese electric car company Nio.

== First generation (2019–2023) ==
First generation
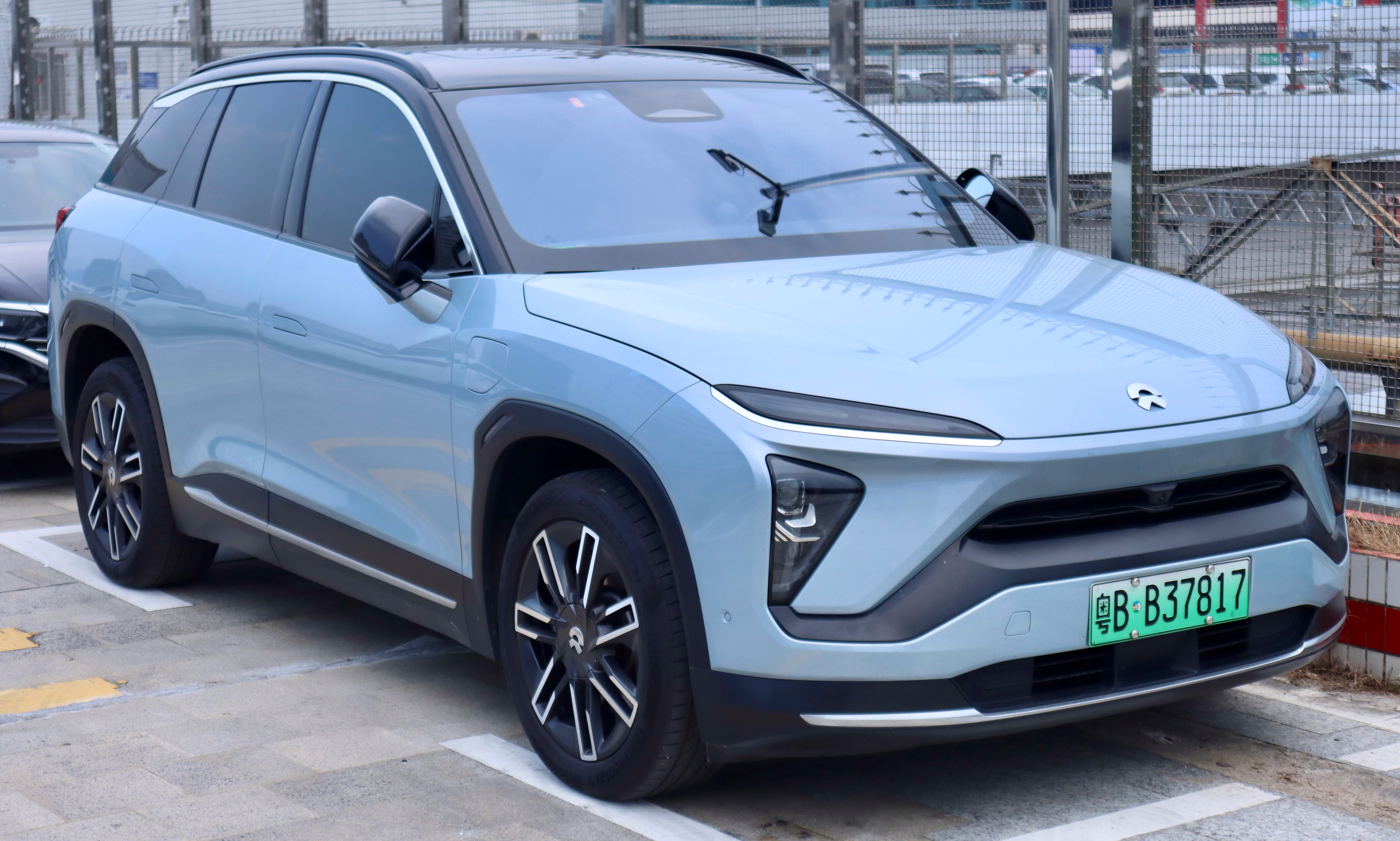

Overview
- Production: 2019–2023
- Assembly: China: Hefei, Anhui
- Designer: Jim Baste, Kevyn Gruchala, Suh Ju-ho, Kris Tomasson

Body and chassis
- Class: Mid-size luxury crossover SUV
- Body style: 5-door SUV
- Layout: Dual motor 4WD
- Related: Nio EC6

Powertrain
- Electric motor: AC induction/asynchronous, Permanent magnet motor
- Transmission: 1-speed direct-drive reduction
- Battery: 70 kWh Li-ion Battery; 84 kWh Li-ion Battery; 100 kWh Li-ion Battery

Dimensions
- Wheelbase: 2,900 mm (114 in)
- Length: 4,850 mm (191 in)
- Width: 1,965 mm (77 in)
- Height: 1,758 mm (69 in)
- Curb weight: 2,290–2,345 kg (5,049–5,170 lb)

The first-generation ES6 is the second SUV product by Nio, announced at Nio Day in December 2018 and was put into production in 2019 for the Chinese market.

=== Specifications ===
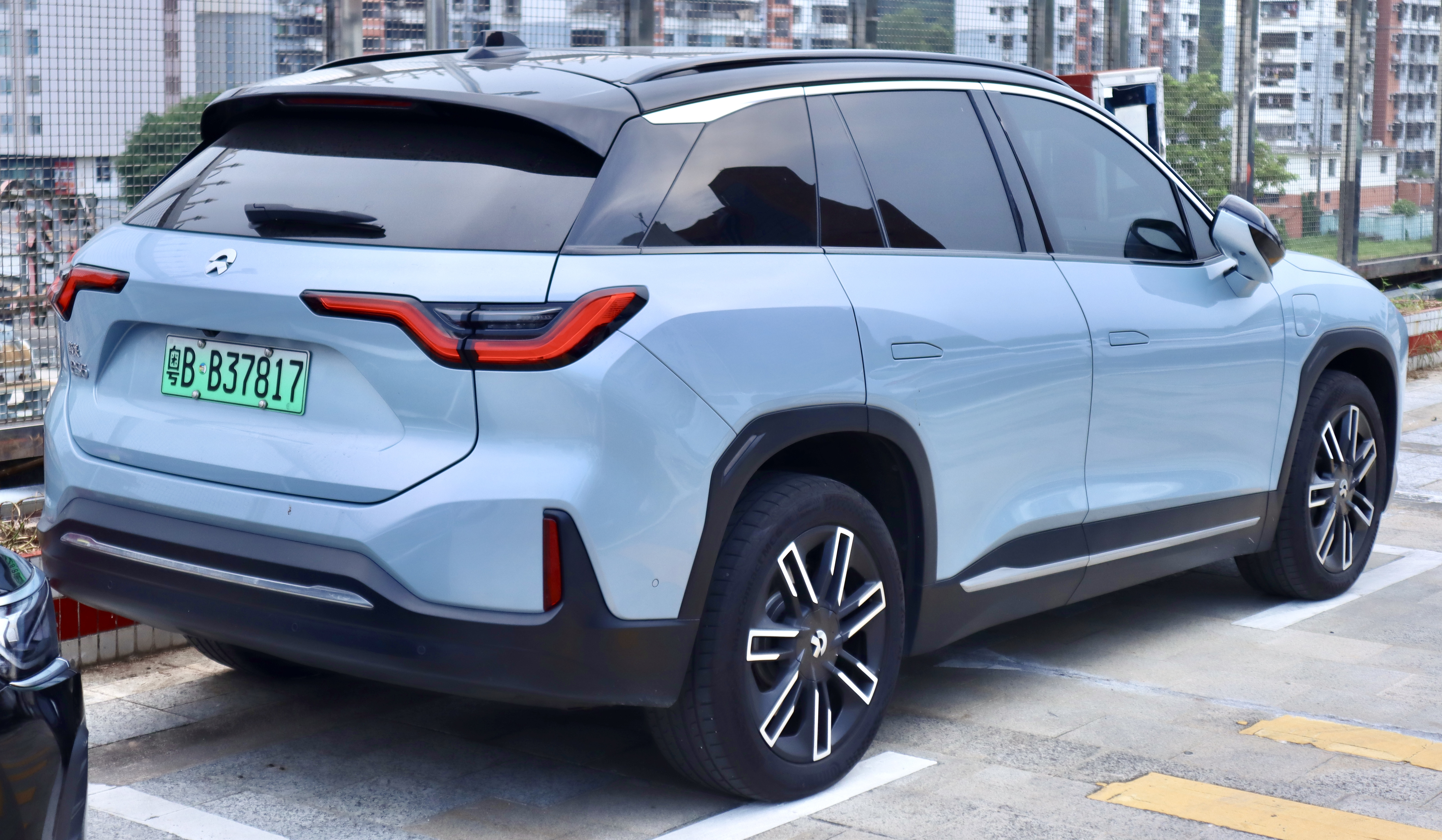
Rear view

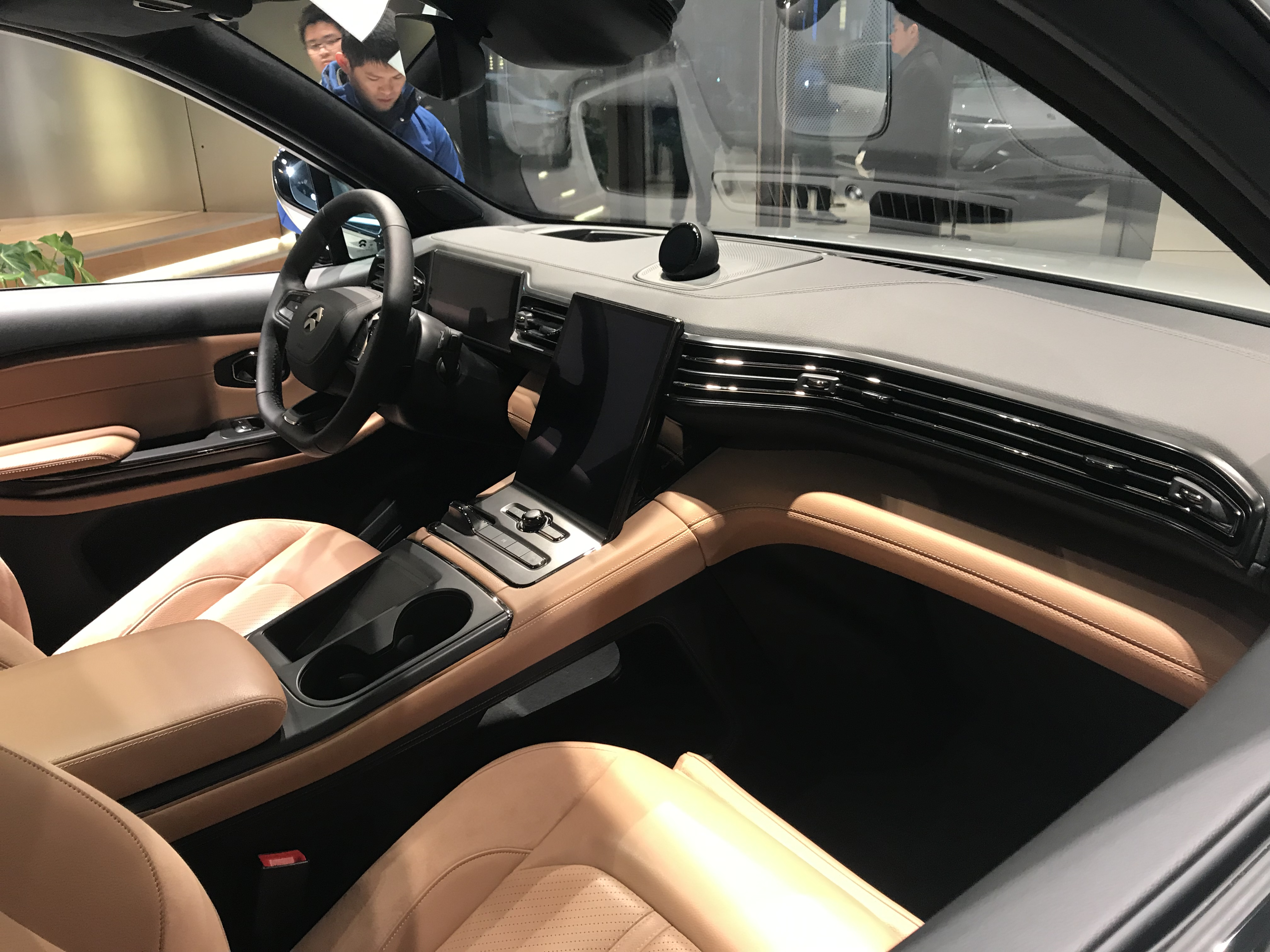
Interior

The ES6 is a 5-seater mid-size production SUV, with a wheelbase of 2,900 mm2,997 mm (118 in) and a body length of 4,850 mm2,997 mm (118 in). The body and chassis are completely aluminum, and the drivetrain is all-wheel drive standard, and featured active air suspension. The design includes the X-bar and Nio's signature "Spark Beat" taillights.

The Nio ES6 was the world's first SUV with both permanent magnet and induction motors. With a dual-motor four-wheel drive system with a peak power of up to 400 kW (536 hp; 544 PS) and a maximum torque of 725 N⋅m (535 lb⋅ft), the Nio ES6 accelerates from 0–100 km/h (0–62 mph) in 4.7 seconds. The ES7 is powered by a lithium-ion battery pack compatible with Nio's battery swap stations just like the Nio ES8. The range of the car with the 100 kWh battery is up to 610 km (379 mi) NEDC.

== Second generation (2023) ==
Second generation
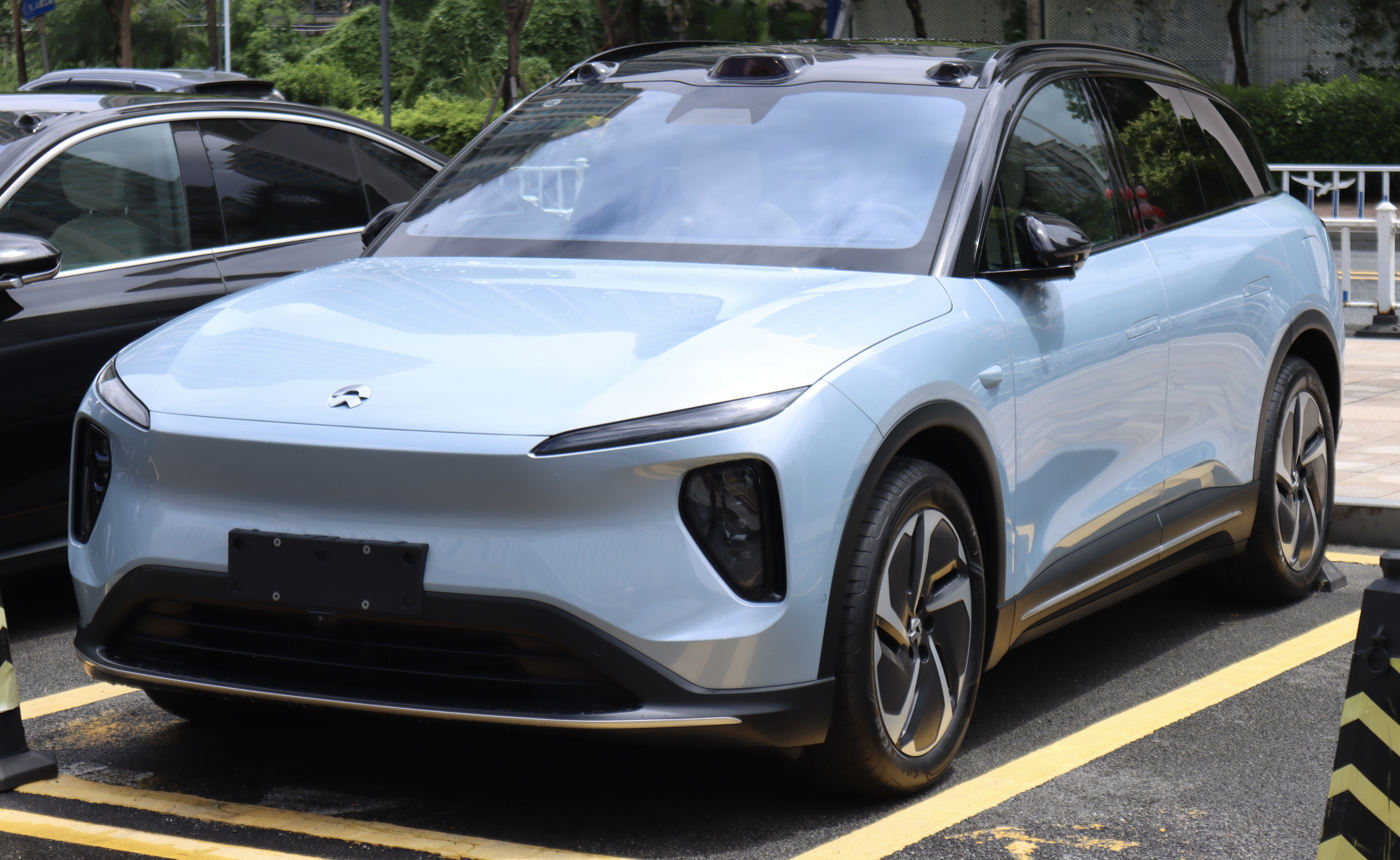

Overview
- Also called: Nio EL6 (Europe)
- Production: 2023–present
- Assembly: China: Hefei, Anhui

Body and chassis
- Class: Mid-size luxury crossover SUV
- Body style: 5-door SUV
- Layout: Dual motor 4WD
- Related: Nio EC6

Powertrain
- Electric motor: AC induction/asynchronous, Permanent magnet motor
- Transmission: 1-speed direct-drive reduction
- Battery: 75 kWh Li-ion Battery; 100 kWh Li-ion Battery; 150 kWh Li-ion Battery

Dimensions
- Wheelbase: 2,915 mm (115 in)
- Length: 4,854 mm (191 in)
- Width: 1,995 mm (79 in)
- Height: 1,703 mm (67 in)
- Curb weight: 2,306–2,353 kg (5,084–5,187 lb)

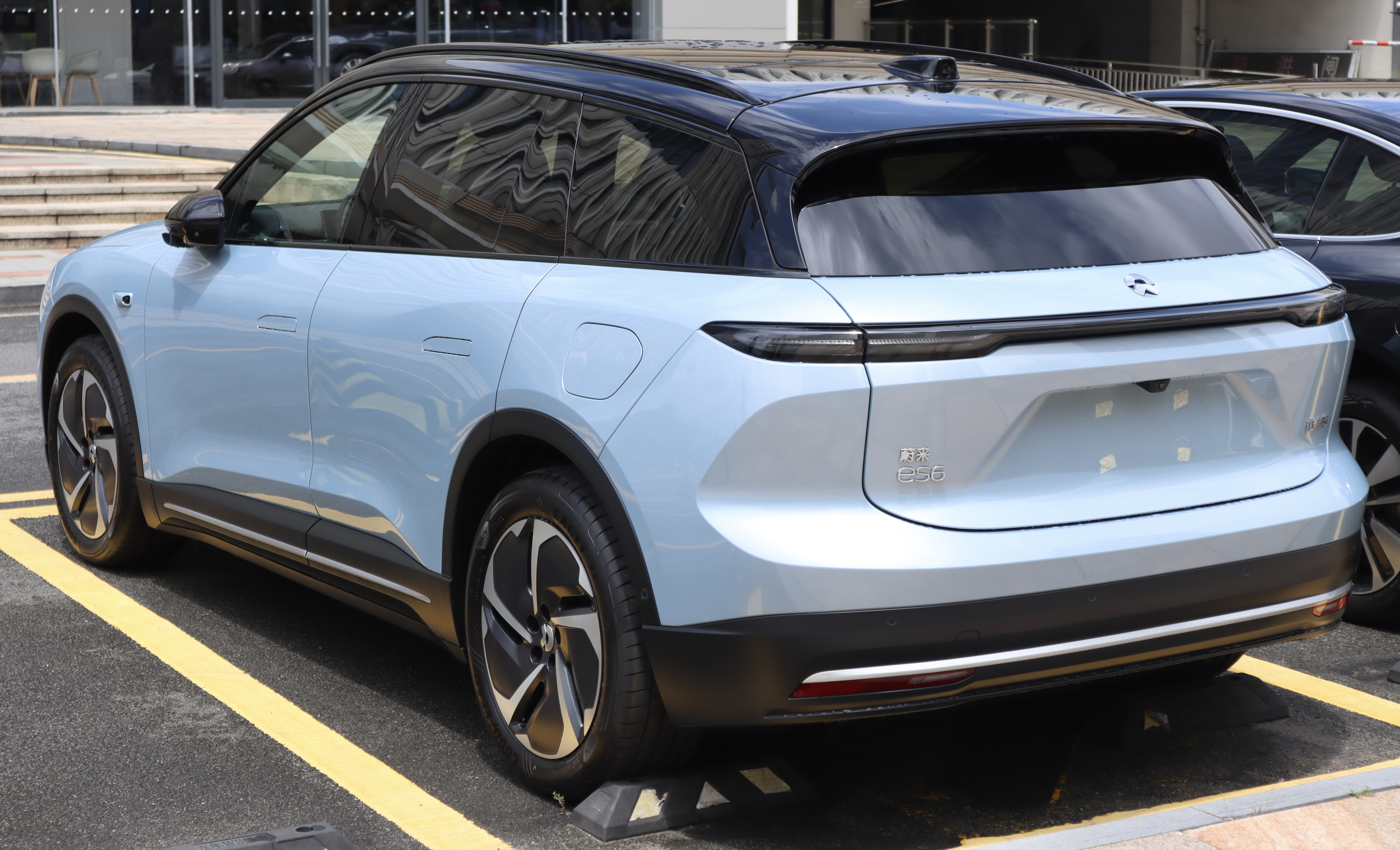
Rear view

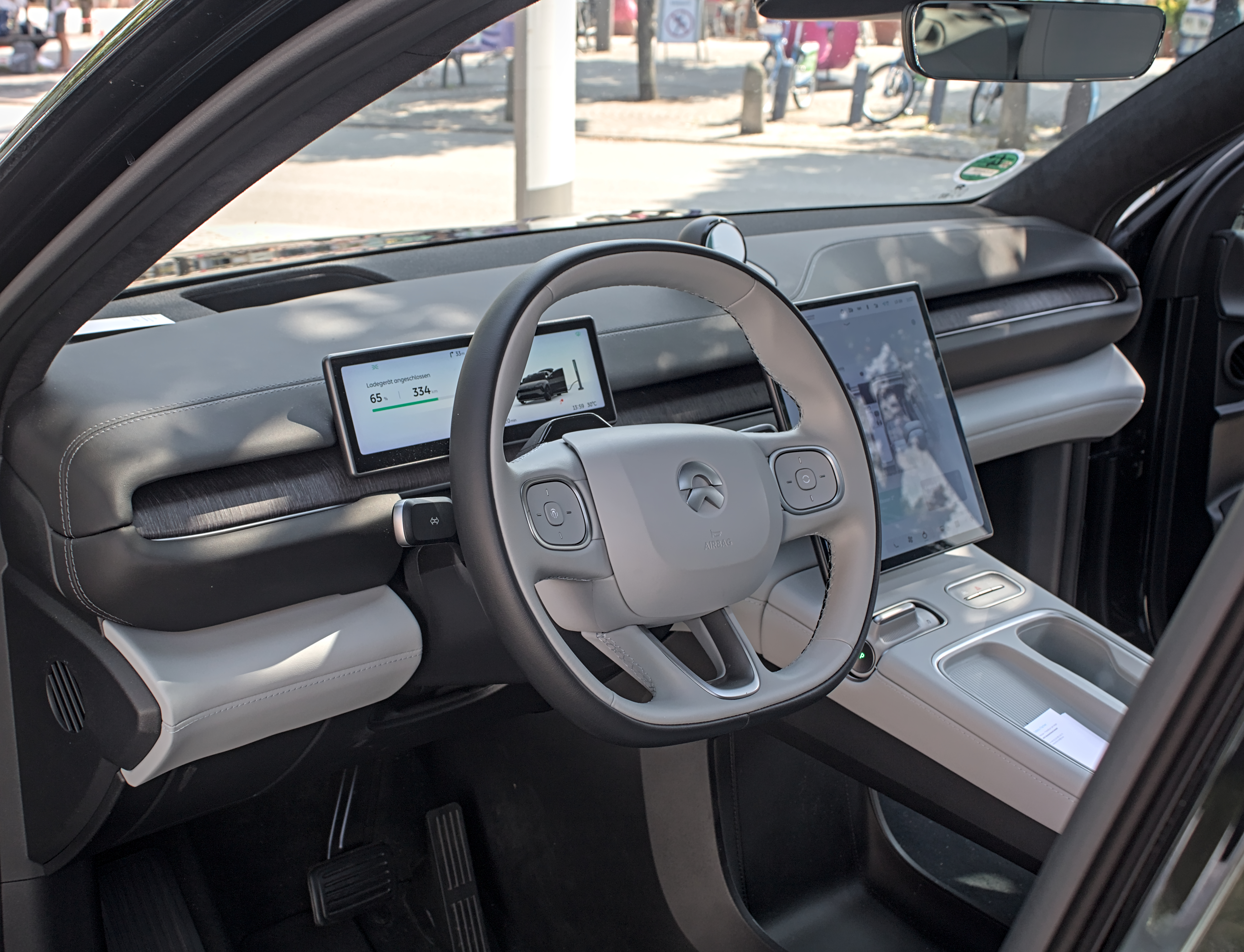
Interior

The second-generation Nio ES6 was shown to the public during 2023 Auto Shanghai. It is built on the NT2.0 platform. While of similar appearance to the first generation, it is an entirely new model. The battery options include a 75 kWh battery capable of a CLTC range of 465 km (289 mi), a 100 kWh battery capable of a CLTC range of 605 km (376 mi), and a 150 kWh battery capable of a CLTC range of 900 km (559 mi).

This car went on sale in Northern Europe as the Nio EL6 in June 2023. Nio had to change the name to EL6 as Audi felt that the "ES6" moniker was too close to their S6 model. The battery options for EL6 include 75 kWh battery capable of a WLTP range of 406 km (252 mi), and a 100 kWh battery capable of a WLTP range of 529 km (329 mi).

=== 2025 facelift ===
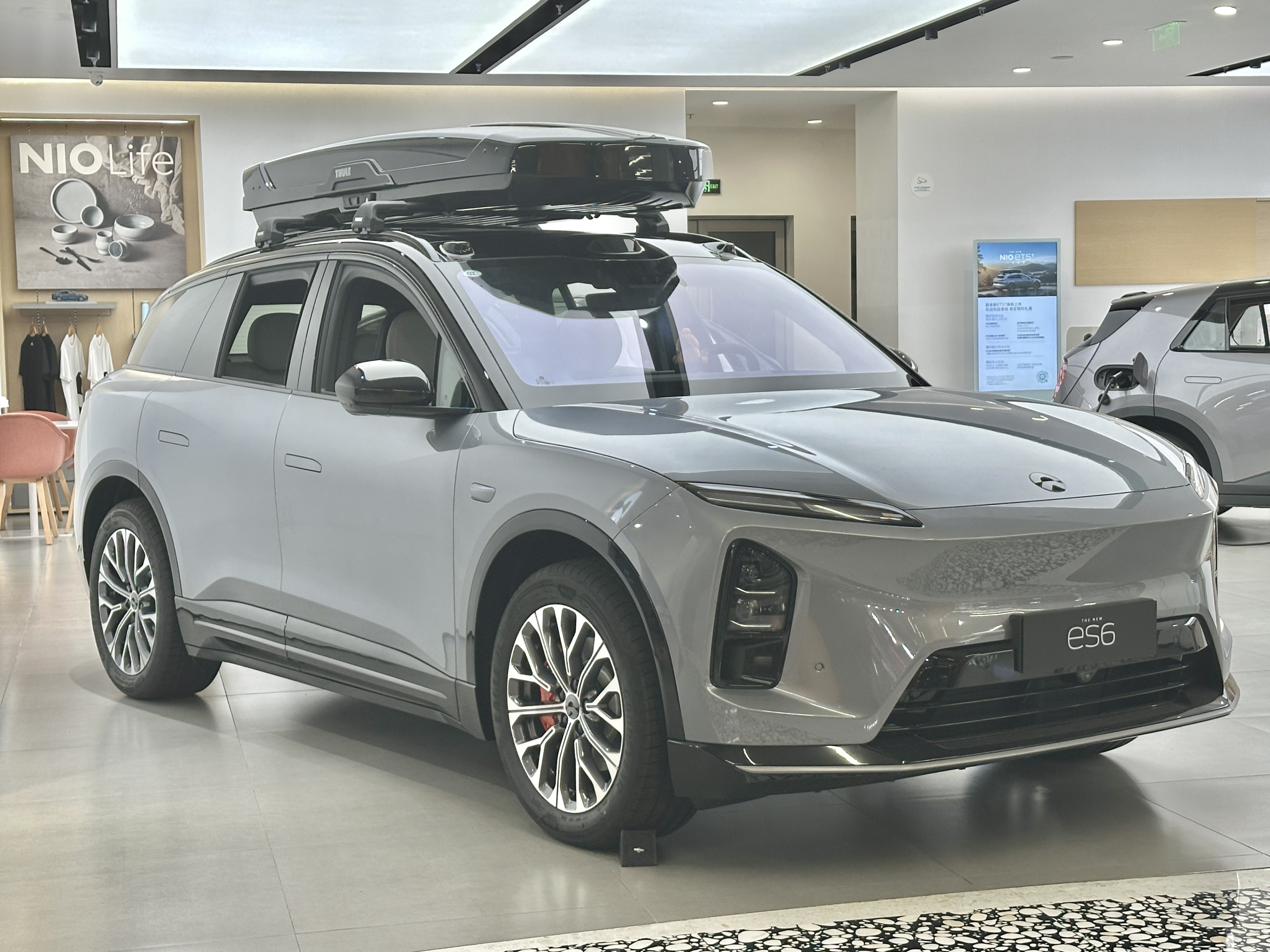
Nio ES6 2025 facelift

Alongside the ET5, ET5T and EC6, the ES6 was given a refresh on May 10, 2025. Changes include a redesigned exterior and interior that matches the flagship ET9, with the notable inclusion of a 15.6-inch landscape-oriented AMOLED central infotainment system replacing the previous portrait setup, a 19.4-inch windshield head-up display (W-HUD) and aa 8-megapixel streaming rearview mirror.

== Sales ==
Year	China
2019	11,970
2020	28,020
2021	41,739
2022	42,012
2023	56,539
2024	75,433
2025	43,864
