= Car of the Year =

Type of award

Car of the Year (COTY) is a common abbreviation for numerous automotive awards.

The "Car of the Year" phrase is considered to have been introduced by Motor Trend magazine in 1949 when the new publication named Cadillac as Motor Trend Car of the Year.

Other publications and various organizations also have developed COTY recognitions. The Australian automobile magazine Wheels began an award in 1963.

In 1964, a jury of European automotive journalists began selecting the European Car of the Year award.

Many COTY awards focus on regional markets, vehicle types, or market segments. An example is the "tow car of the year" in the UK (for pulling travel trailers). or the COTY AJAC award in Canada.

== Criteria ==
The COTY is meant to award excellence in automotive design. Criteria vary, but the World Car of the Year are typical:

- eligible cars are all those that have been launched and gone on sale in the past year
- must be available on at least two continents
- juror can borrow the car in question from manufacturer fleet of test cars
- fitness for purpose
- real-world practicalities such as running costs, interior space and comfort, acceleration, handling, roadholding, ride comfort, noise levels, fit, finish, visual and tactile quality of the interior
- Innovation - advance of car design and engineering

The originator of the COTY award, Motor Trend, uses these criteria:

- Advancement in design
- Engineering excellence - integrity of the total vehicle concept and execution and use of technologies that benefit the consumer
- Efficiency - fuel economy and overall operating costs
- Safety - protect occupants from harm in a crash and avoid a crash
- Value - relative to competitors in the same market segment
- Performance of intended function

== Global ==
- World Car of the Year selected by a jury of 102 international automotive journalists from 30 countries, beginning in 2003

== Regional ==
- Arab Car of the Year (ARABCOTY) (Middle East) https://www.arabcoty.com/
- European Car of the Year selected by a collective of automobile magazines from different countries in Europe. The current organisers of the award are Auto (Italy), Autocar (United Kingdom), Autopista (Spain), Autovisie (Netherlands), L'Automobile Magazine (France), Stern (Germany) and Vi Bilägare (Sweden). The voting jury consists of motoring journalists from publications throughout Europe.
- Asia Car of the Year (ASIACOTY) (Asia) https://www.asiacoty.com/
- Middle East Car of the Year (MECOTY) https://www.mecoty.com/
- North American Car of the Year - 60 automotive journalists from the US and Canada

== National ==
- Drive Car of the Year (Australia)
- Wheels magazine's Car of the Year (Australia)
- Canadian Car of the Year
- China Car of the Year
- German Car of the Year
- Das Goldene Lenkrad (Germany)
- Indian Car of the Year
- Irish Car of the Year
- Japan Car of the Year
- RJC Car of the Year (Japan)
- Korea Car of the Year (KAJA, AWAK)
- Lithuanian Car of the Year
- Qatar Car of the Year - Maqina Magazine (QCOTY) (Qatar)
- Russian Car of the Year
- South African Car of the Year
- UK Car of the Year
- The Car Expert UK Combined Car of the Year Awards (UK)
- Auto Express magazine's Car of the Year Awards (UK)
- Parker's Car Guides Car of the Year Awards (UK)
- What Car? Car of the Year (UK)
- Car and Driver magazine's Ten Best (USA)
- Motor Trend magazine's Motor Trend Car of the Year The magazine continues its COTY award begun in 1949, and has also expanded to separate trophies for pickup trucks and sport utility vehicles (SUVs) (USA)
- MotorWeek's Driver's Choice Awards (USA)
- Green Car of the Year selected by Green Car Journal (USA)

== Sample Results ==
Year	World Car of the Year	World Performance Car	World Green Car	World Car Design of the Year	World Luxury Car	World Urban Car
2020	Kia Telluride	Porsche Taycan		Mazda3	Porsche Taycan	Kia Soul EV
2019	Jaguar I-Pace	McLaren 720S	Jaguar I-Pace	Jaguar I-Pace	Audi A7	Suzuki Jimny
2018	Volvo XC40	BMW M5	Nissan LEAF	Range Rover Velar	Audi A8	Volkswagen Polo
2017	Jaguar F-Pace	Porsche Boxster Cayman	Toyota Prius Prime	Jaguar F-Pace	Mercedes-Benz E-Class	BMW i3
2016	Mazda MX-5	Audi R8 Coupe	Toyota Mirai	Mazda MX-5	BMW 7 Series	
2015	Mercedes-Benz C-Class (W205)	Mercedes-AMG GT	BMW i8	Citroën C4 Cactus	Mercedes-Benz S-Class (C217)	
2014	Audi A3	Porsche 911 GT3	BMW i3	BMW i3	Mercedes-Benz S-Class (W222)	
2013	Volkswagen Golf Mk7	Porsche Boxster / Cayman	Tesla Model S	Jaguar F-Type		
2012	Volkswagen up!	Porsche 991	Mercedes-Benz S250 BlueEfficiency	Range Rover Evoque		
2011	Nissan Leaf	Ferrari 458 Italia	Chevrolet Volt	Aston Martin Rapide		
2010	Volkswagen Polo	Audi R8 V10	Volkswagen BlueMotion	Chevrolet Camaro		
2009	Volkswagen Golf Mk6	Nissan GT-R	Honda FCX Clarity	Fiat Nuova 500		
2008	Mazda2 / Demio	Audi R8	BMW 118d with Efficient Dynamics	Audi R8		
2007	Lexus LS 460	Audi RS4	Mercedes-Benz E320 Bluetec	Audi TT		
2006	BMW 3 Series	Porsche Cayman S	Honda Civic Hybrid	Citroën C4		
2005	Audi A6					

Year	European Car of the Year	North American Car of the Year	North American Utility of the Year	North American Truck of the Year
2020	Peugeot 208	Chevrolet Corvette	Kia Telluride	Jeep Gladiator
2019	Jaguar I-Pace	Genesis G70	Hyundai Kona	Ram 1500
2018	Volvo XC40	Honda Accord	Volvo XC60	Lincoln Navigator
2017	Peugeot 3008 SUV	Chevrolet Bolt	Chrysler Pacifica	Honda Ridgeline
2016	Opel/Vauxhall Astra	Honda Civic	Volvo XC90	
2015	Volkswagen Passat	Volkswagen Golf		Ford F-150
2014	Peugeot 308	Chevrolet Corvette Stingray		Chevrolet Silverado
2013	Volkswagen Golf	Cadillac ATS		Ram 1500
2012	Chevrolet Volt/Opel/Vauxhall Ampera	Hyundai Elantra	Range Rover Evoque	
2011	Nissan Leaf	Chevrolet Volt	Ford Explorer	
2010	Volkswagen Polo	Ford Fusion Hybrid		Ford Transit Connect
2009	Vauxhall/Opel Insignia	Hyundai Genesis		Ford F-150
2008	Fiat 500	Chevrolet Malibu	Mazda CX-9	
2007	Ford S-Max	Saturn Aura		Chevrolet Silverado
2006	Renault Clio	Honda Civic		Honda Ridgeline
2005	Toyota Prius	Chrysler 300	Ford Escape Hybrid	
2004	Fiat Panda	Toyota Prius		Ford F-150
2003	Renault Mégane	MINI Cooper	Volvo XC90	
2002	Peugeot 307	Nissan Altima	Chevrolet Trailblazer	
2001	Alfa Romeo 147	Chrysler PT Cruiser	Acura MDX	
2000	Toyota Yaris	Ford Focus	Nissan Xterra	
1999	Ford Focus	Chrysler 300M	Jeep Grand Cherokee	
1998	Alfa Romeo 156	Chevrolet Corvette	Mercedes-Benz M-Class	
1997	Renault Mégane Scénic	Mercedes-Benz SLK-Class		Ford Expedition
1996	Fiat Bravo and Brava	Chrysler minivans		Ford F-150
1995	Fiat Punto	Honda Civic		Chevrolet Blazer
1994	Ford Mondeo	Mercedes-Benz C-Class		Dodge Ram

Year	Middle East Motor Awards COTY
2013	Jaguar F-Type
2012	McLaren MP4-12C
2011	Volvo S60

== See also ==
- List of motor vehicle awards
