= Canadian Car of the Year =

Automobile Journalists Association of Canada award

Canadian Car of the Year winners, as chosen by the Automobile Journalists Association of Canada:

== Canadian Car of the Year ==
Year	Car of the Year	Utility Vehicle of the Year
2026	Honda Civic	Hyundai Palisade
2025	Honda Civic*	Hyundai Santa Fe
2024	Toyota Prius*	Toyota Grand Highlander
2023	BMW i4	Hyundai IONIQ 5
2022	Honda Civic*	Hyundai Tucson
2021	Mazda 3	Genesis GV80
2020	Mazda 3	Jaguar I-Pace
2019	Kia Stinger	Jaguar I-Pace*
2018	Honda Accord	Chrysler Pacifica
2017	Volkswagen Golf Sportwagen	Subaru Forester
2016	Honda Civic Sedan	Mazda CX-3
2015	Subaru Legacy	Ford F-150
2014	Mazda 6	Jeep Cherokee
2013	Honda Accord	Hyundai Santa Fe
2012	Hyundai Elantra	Volkswagen Touareg TDI Clean Diesel
2011	Chevrolet Cruze	Ford Edge
2010	Volkswagen Golf GTI	Subaru Outback
2009	Hyundai Genesis	Ford Flex
2008	Audi R8	Chevrolet Silverado
2007	Toyota Camry Hybrid	Acura RDX Technology Package
2006	Honda Civic	Honda Ridgeline
2005	Ford Mustang	Honda Odyssey
2004	Mazda 3	Ford F-150
2003	Nissan 350Z	Nissan Murano
2002	Nissan Altima	Jeep Liberty
2001	Chrysler PT Cruiser	Mazda Tribute
2000	Ford Focus	Nissan Xterra
1999	Acura 3.2 TL	Honda Odyssey
1998	Mercedes-Benz ML320	
1997	BMW M3	
1996	Dodge Caravan/Plymouth Voyager	
1995	Dodge Neon/Plymouth Neon	
1994	Mercedes-Benz C-Class	
1993	Chrysler LH Sedans	
1992	Honda Accord	
1991	Lexus LS 400	
1990	Nissan 300ZX	
1989	Ford Taurus SHO	
1988	Lincoln Continental	
1987	Pontiac Bonneville	

*Indicates the vehicle won the North American Car of the Year; underlining indicates the vehicle won the World Car Awards.

== 2014 ==
Canadian car of the year: Mazda 6
Canadian Utility vehicle of the year: Jeep Cherokee
Best New Small Car (under $21,000): Mazda 3
Best New Small Car (over $21,000): Mazda 3 Sport
Best New Family Car (under $30,000): Kia Soul
Best New Family Car (over $30,000): Mazda 6
Best New Luxury Car (under $50,000): Lexus IS 350 RWD
Best New Luxury Car (over $50,000): Infiniti Q50 Hybrid
Best New Prestige Car: Mercedes-Benz S Class
Best New Sports / Performance Car (over $50,000):Chevrolet Corvette Stingray
Best New SUV / CUV (under $35,000): Jeep Cherokee
Best New SUV / CUV ($35,000 - $60,000):Kia Sorento
Best New SUV / CUV (over $60,000):Acura MDX
Best New Pickup: GMC Sierra
Best New Technology: Innovation :Infiniti: Direct Adaptive Steering
Best New Technology: Safety: Infiniti: Predictive Forward Collision Warning

== 2013 ==
Car of the year: Honda Accord Sedan
Utility Vehicle of the year: Hyundai Santa Fe Sport 2.0T
Best New City Car: Ford Focus EV
Best New Small Car (under $21,000): Mazda 3 Skyactiv Sedan
Best New Small Car (over $21,000): Hyundai Elantra GT
Best New Family Car (under $30,000): Honda Accord Sedan
Best New Family Car (over $30,000): Ford Fusion Hybrid
Best New Luxury Car: Cadillac ATS
Best New Prestige / Performance Car: Porsche 911 Carrera S
Best New Sports / Performance Car (under $50,000): Ford Focus ST
Best New Sports / Performance Car (over $50,000): Porsche Boxster
Best New SUV / CUV (under $35,000): Ford Escape 1.6L EcoBoost
Best New SUV / CUV ($35,000 - $60,000): Hyundai Santa Fe Sport 2.0T
Best New Technology: General Motors: Front Centre Airbag
Best New Design: Porsche 911 Carrera S

== 2012 ==
Car of the year:Hyundai Elantra
Utility Vehicle of the year: Volkswagen Touareg TDI Clean Diesel
Best New Small Car (under $21,000): Hyundai Accent
Best New Small Car (over $21,000): Hyundai Elantra
Best New Family Car (under $30,000): Kia Optima LX
Best New Family Car (over $30,000): Kia Optima Hybrid
Best New Luxury Car:Mercedes-Benz C-Class C350 4MATIC Sedan
Best New Prestige Car: Mercedes-Benz S-Class S350 BlueTEC 4MATIC
Best New Sports / Performance Car (under $50,000):Hyundai Veloster
Best New Sports / Performance Car (over $50,000):BMW 1 Series M Coupé
Best New SUV / CUV (under $35,000):Dodge Journey
Best New SUV / CUV ($35,000 - $60,000):Volkswagen Touareg TDI Clean Diesel
Best New SUV / CUV (over $60,000):BMW X3
Best New Technology: General Motors: Voltec Propulsion System
Best New Design: Hyundai Veloster

== 2011 ==
Best New Small Car (under $21,000) - Ford Fiesta
Best New Small Car (over $21,000) - Chevrolet Cruze
Best New Family Car (under $30,000) - Volkswagen Jetta TDI Clean Diesel
Best New Family Car (over $30,000) - Buick Regal
Best New Luxury Car (over $50,000) - BMW 5 Series Sedan
Best New Prestige Car - Porsche 911 Turbo S
Best New Sports / Performance Car (over $50,000) - Cadillac CTS-V Coupe
Best New Minivan - Toyota Sienna
Best New SUV / CUV (under $35,000) - Hyundai Tucson
Best New SUV / CUV ($35,000 - $50,000) - Ford Edge
Best New SUV / CUV (over $50,000) - Volkswagen Touareg
Best New Technology - Ford's Rear Inflatable Seat Belts
Best New Design - Mercedes-Benz SLS AMG

== 2010 ==
Best New Small Car (under $21,000) - Mazda3
Best New Small Car (over $21,000) - Mazda3 Sport
Best New Family Car (under $30,000) - Volkswagen Golf Wagon TDI
Best New Family Car (over $30,000) - Ford Taurus
Best New Luxury Car (over $50,000) - BMW 335d Sedan
Best New Prestige Car - Porsche Panamera
Best New Sports / Performance Car (under $50,000) - Volkswagen Golf GTI
Best New Sports / Performance Car (over $50,000) - Audi S4
Best New Convertible - Audi S5 Cabriolet
Best New SUV / CUV (under $35,000) - Subaru Outback
Best New SUV / CUV ($35,000 - $60,000) - Volkswagen Touareg TDI Clean Diesel
Best New SUV / CUV (over $60,000) - Lexus RX450h

== 2009 ==
Best New Small Car (under $18,000) - Toyota Corolla
Best New Small Car (over $18,000) - Pontiac Vibe
Best New Family Car ($22,000-$30,000) - Mazda6
Best New Family Car (over $30,000) - Volkswagen Passat CC
Best New Luxury Car (under $50,000) - Hyundai Genesis
Best New Luxury Car (over $50,000) - Audi A4
Best New Prestige Car - Mercedes CL 550 and Mercedes SL 63 AMG (tie)
Best New Sports / Performance Car (under $50,000) - BMW 135i Coupe
Best New Sports / Performance Car (over $50,000) - Lexus IS F
Best New Convertible - Audi TTS
Best New SUV / CUV (under $35,000) - Subaru Forester
Best New SUV / CUV ($35,000 - $60,000) - Ford Flex
Best New SUV / CUV (over $60,000) - Mercedes-Benz M-Class BlueTEC
Best New Pick-up Truck - Dodge Ram

== 2008 ==
Best New Small Car - Saturn Astra
Best New Family Car - Honda Accord EX Sedan
Best New Luxury Car - Mercedes-Benz C Class
Best New Prestige Car - Audi R8
Best New Sports / Performance Car (under $50,000) - MINI Cooper S
Best New Sports / Performance Car (over $50,000) - Audi S5
Best New Convertible - BMW 335i Cabriolet
Best New Minivan - Hyundai Entourage
Best New SUV / CUV (under $35,000) - Nissan Rogue
Best New SUV / CUV ($35,000 - $60,000) - Saturn Vue
Best New SUV / CUV (over $60,000) - Buick Enclave
Best New Pick-up Truck - Chevrolet Silverado
Best New Technology - Ford Sync
Best New Design - Audi R8

== 2007 ==
Best Small Car (under $18k) – Honda Fit LX
Best Small Car (over $18k) – Volkswagen Rabbit 2.5
Best New Family Car ($22k -$30k) – Toyota Camry LE
Best New Family Car (over $30k) – Toyota Camry Hybrid
Best Luxury Car (under $50k) – Lexus ES350
Best Prestige Car (over $75k) – Audi S8
Best Sports/Performance Car (under $50k) – Mazdaspeed3
Best Sports/Performance Car (over $50k) – BMW 3 Series Coupé
Best Convertible Car – Volkswagen EOS 2.0T
Best SUV/CUV (under $35k) – Toyota RAV4 - V6 Sport
Best SUV/CUV ($35k-$60k) – Acura RDX Technology Package
Best SUV/CUV (over $60k) – Mercedes-Benz GL-Class (X164)
Best Pick-up – Chevrolet Avalanche

== 2006 ==
Best New Economy Car – Honda Civic Sedan
Best New Family Car (under $35,000) – Hyundai Sonata GLS
Best New Family Car (over $35,000) – Hyundai Azera
Best New Luxury / Prestige Car – BMW 5 Series Touring
Best New Sports Sedan – BMW 3 Series
Best New Sport Car – Honda Civic Si Coupe
Best New Sport Utility Vehicle – Mercedes-Benz M-Class
Best New Pick-up – Honda Ridgeline
Best New Multipurpose Family Vehicle – Mazda Mazda5
Best New Modern Muscle Car – Dodge Magnum SRT-8
Most Coveted Vehicle – Chevrolet Corvette C6 Z06

== 2005 ==
Best New Economy Car – Kia Spectra Sedan
Best New Family Car – Mazda Mazda6 Sport
Best New Luxury Car – Chrysler 300C
Best New Sport Utility Vehicle – BMW X3 3.0i
Best New Crossover – Hyundai Tucson
Best New Sport Compact – Volvo S40
Best New Sports / Performance Car – Ford Mustang
Best New Minivan – Honda Odyssey
Best New Station Wagon – Mazda Mazda6 Sport Wagon
Best New Pick-up – Toyota Tacoma
Best New Convertible – Mercedes-Benz SLK350
Best New Alternative Power – Honda Accord Hybrid

== 2004 ==
Best New Economy Car – Mazda Mazda3
Best New Family Vehicle – Mazda Mazda6
Best New Luxury Car – BMW 5-Series
Best New Minivan – Toyota Sienna
Best New MPV / Crossover Vehicle – Infiniti FX45
Best New Pick-up Truck – Ford F-150
Best New Sport Utility Vehicle – Subaru Forester 2.5 XT
Best New Sports / Performance Vehicle – Mazda RX-8
Best New Sports Coupe (over $35,000) – Infiniti G35 Coupe
Best New Sports Coupe (under $35,000) – Mazda Mazda3 Sport

== 2003 ==
Best Economy Car – Mitsubishi Lancer ES
Best New Design – Nissan 350Z
Best New Family Vehicle – Honda Accord Sedan
Best New Luxury Car – Mercedes-Benz E-Class
Best New Sport Utility Vehicle (over $45,000) – Volvo XC90 2.5T
Best New Sport Utility Vehicle (under $45,000) – Nissan Murano
Best New Sports and Performance Car – Nissan 350Z
Best New Sports Coupe (over $35,000) – Mercedes-Benz C32 AMG
Best New Sports Coupe (under $35,000) – Mazdaspeed Protegé
Best New Station Wagon – Pontiac Vibe
Best New Technology – General Motors MagneRide System
2003 Canadian Car of the Year – Nissan 350Z
2003 Canadian Truck of the Year – Nissan Murano

== 2002 ==
Best New Design – Nissan Altima
Best New Economy Car – Mazda Protegé
Best New Family Car – Nissan Altima
Best New Minivan – Honda Odyssey
Best New Pick-up Truck – Chevrolet Avalanche
Best New Prestige Car – BMW M3
Best New Sport Utility Vehicle – Jeep Liberty
Best New Sports Coupe – Acura RSX
Best New Station Wagon – Mercedes-Benz C320 Wagon
Best New Technology – General Motors Quadrasteer Four-Wheel Steering System
2002 Canadian Car of the Year – Nissan Altima
2002 Canadian Truck of the Year – Jeep Liberty

== 2001 ==
Best New Compact Sport Utility – Mazda Tribute
Best New Design – Chrysler PT Cruiser
Best New Economy Car – Honda Civic DX Sedan
Best New Family Car (over $25,000) – Volvo S40
Best New Family Car (under $25,000) – Chrysler PT Cruiser
Best New Green Vehicle – Honda Insight
Best New Intermediate Sport Utility Vehicle – Subaru Outback H6 3.0 VDC
Best New Luxury Coupe or Sedan – Mercedes-Benz C240
Best New Luxury Sport Utility Vehicle – Acura MDX
Best New Minivan – Dodge Grand Caravan
Best New Pick-up Truck – Dodge Dakota Quad Cab
Best New Prestige Car – Audi A8 L
Best New Sports and Performance Car – Chevrolet Corvette Z06
Best New Sports Coupe (under $30,000) – Volkswagen GTI 1.8T
Best New Sports Coupe or Sedan (over $30,000) – Volvo S60
Best New Station Wagon – Volvo V40
Best New Technology – Honda Insight Integrated Motor Assist System
2001 Canadian Car of the Year – Chrysler PT Cruiser
2001 Canadian Truck of the Year – Mazda Tribute

== 2000 ==
Best New Design – Audi TT Quattro Coupe
Best New Economy Car – Ford Focus LX
Best New Family Car (over $25,000) – Nissan Maxima GXE
Best New Family Car (under $25,000) – Ford Focus ZTS
Best New Luxury Car – Infiniti I30
Best New Luxury Coupe – BMW 328Ci
Best New Prestige Car – Audi A6 4.2
Best New Sport Utility Vehicle – Nissan Xterra
Best New Sports Car – Audi TT Quattro Coupe
Best New Sports Coupe – Honda Civic SiR
Best New Sports Coupe – Ford Focus ZX3
Best New Sports Sedan – Nissan Maxima SE
Best New Station Wagon – Saturn LW2
Best New Technology – General Motors night vision
2000 Canadian Car of the Year – Ford Focus
2000 Canadian Truck of the Year – Nissan Xterra

== 1999 ==
Best New Design – Volkswagen New Beetle
Best New Family Car (over $25,000) – Oldsmobile Intrigue 3.5
Best New Family Car (under $25,000) – Mazda Protegé ES
Best New Luxury Sedan – BMW 3-Series 328i
Best New Performance Car – Chevrolet Corvette Hardtop
Best New Pickup – GMC Sierra
Best New Prestige Car – Volvo S80 T6
Best New Sport Utility Vehicle – Jeep Grand Cherokee
Best New Sports Coupe – Volkswagen New Beetle
Best New Sports Sedan – Acura 3.2 TL
Best New Station Wagon – Volkswagen Passat
Best New Technology – Land Rover Active Cornering Enhancement (ACE)
Best New Van – Honda Odyssey
1999 Canadian Car of the Year – Acura TL 3.2
1999 Canadian Truck of the Year – Honda Odyssey

== 1998 ==
Best New Design – Porsche Boxster
Best New Family Sedan – Volkswagen Passat
Best New Luxury Car – Mazda Millenia
Best New Luxury Coupe – Mercedes-Benz CLK320
Best New Luxury Sedan – Audi A6
Best New Pickup – Mazda B-Series
Best New Sport Utility Vehicle – Mercedes-Benz ML320
Best New Sports Car – Porsche Boxster
Best New Sports Coupe – Acura Integra Type R
Best New Sports Sedan – Audi A4 1.8T
Best New Station Wagon – Volvo V70
Best New Van – Toyota Sienna
1998 Car of the Year – Mercedes-Benz ML320

== 1997 ==
Best New Economy Car – Ford Escort Sedan
Best New Family Car – Acura EL 1.6
Best New Luxury Car – Cadillac Catera
Best New Performance Car – BMW M3
Best New Pickup – Ford F-150
Best New Prestige Car – Mercedes-Benz E420
Best New Sport Utility Vehicle – Ford Expedition
Best New Sports Coupe/Convertible – Hyundai Tiburon
Best New Station Wagon – Ford Escort Wagon
Best New Van – Chevrolet Venture
1997 Car of the Year – BMW M3

== 1996 ==
Best New Economy Car – Honda Civic
Best New Family Car – Ford Taurus
Best New Luxury Car – Infiniti I30
Best New Pickup – Dodge Ram Extended Cab
Best New Prestige Car – Mercedes-Benz E320
Best New Sport Utility Vehicle – Chevrolet Tahoe
Best New Sport Utility Vehicle – GMC Yukon
Best New Sports Coupe – BMW 318ti
Best New Station Wagon – Subaru Legacy Outback
Best New Van – Dodge Caravan
Best New Van – Plymouth Voyager
1996 Car of the Year – Dodge Caravan
1996 Car of the Year – Plymouth Voyager

== 1995 ==
Best New Convertible – Volkswagen Cabrio
Best New Economy Car – Dodge Neon
Best New Economy Car – Plymouth Neon
Best New Family Car – Chrysler Cirrus
Best New Performance Car – Mercedes-Benz E-Class E36
Best New Prestige Car – BMW 740i
Best New Sport Utility Vehicle – Chevrolet Blazer
Best New Sport Utility Vehicle – GMC Jimmy
Best New Sports Coupe – Honda del Sol VTEC
Best New Wagon/Van – Subaru Legacy Station Wagon
1995 Car of the Year – Dodge Neon
1995 Car of the Year – Plymouth Neon

== 1994 ==
Best New Economy Car – Nissan Sentra
Best New Family Sedan – Honda Accord
Best New Luxury Car – Mercedes-Benz C-Class
Best New Performance Car – Chevrolet Camaro Z28
Best New Performance Car – Pontiac Trans Am
Best New Performance Sedan – Volvo 850 Turbo
Best New Pickup – Chevrolet S-10
Best New Pickup – GMC Sonoma
Best New Sports Car – Acura Integra Coupe
Best New Station Wagon – Volvo 850 Turbo Wagon
1994 Car of the Year – Mercedes-Benz C-Class

== 1993 ==
Best New Economy Car – Volkswagen Golf
Best New Family Car – Chrysler LH platform
Best New Light Truck/Sport Utility – Land Rover Range Rover County LWB
Best New Luxury Car – Infiniti J30
Best New Performance Car – Honda Prelude SRV
Best New Sports Car – Volkswagen Corrado VR6
Best New Wagon/Van – Subaru Legacy Touring Wagon LE
1993 Car of the Year – Chrysler LH platform

== 1992 ==
Best New 4x4/Sport Utility/Light Truck – Suzuki
Best New Economy Car – Honda Civic LX Sedan
Best New Family Sedan – Nissan Maxima
Best New Luxury Sedan – BMW 325i
Best New Luxury Touring Coupe – Lexus SC 400
Best New Performance Car – Mazda RX-7
Best New Sporty Car – Mazda MX-3 Precidia
Best New Van/Wagon – Dodge Colt
Best New Van/Wagon – Plymouth Colt
Best New Van/Wagon – Eagle Summit
1992 Car of the Year – BMW 325i

== 1991 ==
Best New 4x4/Sport Utility/Light Truck – Ford Explorer
Best New Coupe – Nissan NX
Best New Luxury Sedan – Lexus LS 400
Best New Sporty/Performance Car – Acura NSX
Best New Van/Wagon – Toyota Previa
1991 Car of the Year – Lexus LS 400

== 1990 ==
Best New Light Truck/Van/Sport Utility – Mazda MPV AWD
Best New Performance/Sports Car – Nissan 300ZX
Best New Sedan – Subaru Legacy
Best New Sports Coupe – Eagle Talon
Best New Sports Coupe – Plymouth Laser
1990 Car of the Year – Nissan 300ZX

== 1989 ==
Best New Light Truck/Van/Sport Utility – Mazda MPV
Best New Performance Car – Ford Taurus SHO
1989 Car of the Year – Ford Taurus SHO

== 1988 ==
Best New Domestic Sedan – Lincoln Continental
Best New Import Sedan – Acura Legend
Best New Light Truck/Van /Utility – Chrysler Magicwagon
Best New Sports Car – Toyota MR2 Supercharged
Best New Sports Sedan/Coupe – Acura Legend Coupe
1988 Car of the Year – Lincoln Continental

== 1987 ==
Best New Domestic Sedan – Pontiac Bonneville
Best New Import Sedan – Toyota Camry
Best New Light Truck/Van/Utility – Nissan Pathfinder
Best New Sport Sedan/Coupe – Ford Thunderbird Turbo Coupe
Best New Sports Car – Nissan Pulsar NX SE
1987 Car of the Year – Pontiac Bonneville

== 1986 ==
Best New Domestic Sedan – Ford Taurus
Best New Import Sedan – Honda Accord
Best New Light Truck/Van/Sport Utility – Nissan Multi 4X4
Best New Sports Car – Mazda RX-7
Best New Sports Sedan – Saab 9000
Best New Sports Sedan – Saab 900 Turbo 16

== 1985 ==
Best New Domestic Sedan – Volkswagen Golf
Best New Import Sedan – Volkswagen Jetta
Best New Light Truck/Van /Utility – Chrysler Magicwagon
Best New Sports Car – Porsche

== See also ==
- Car of the Year
- List of motor vehicle awards
