= South African Car of the Year =

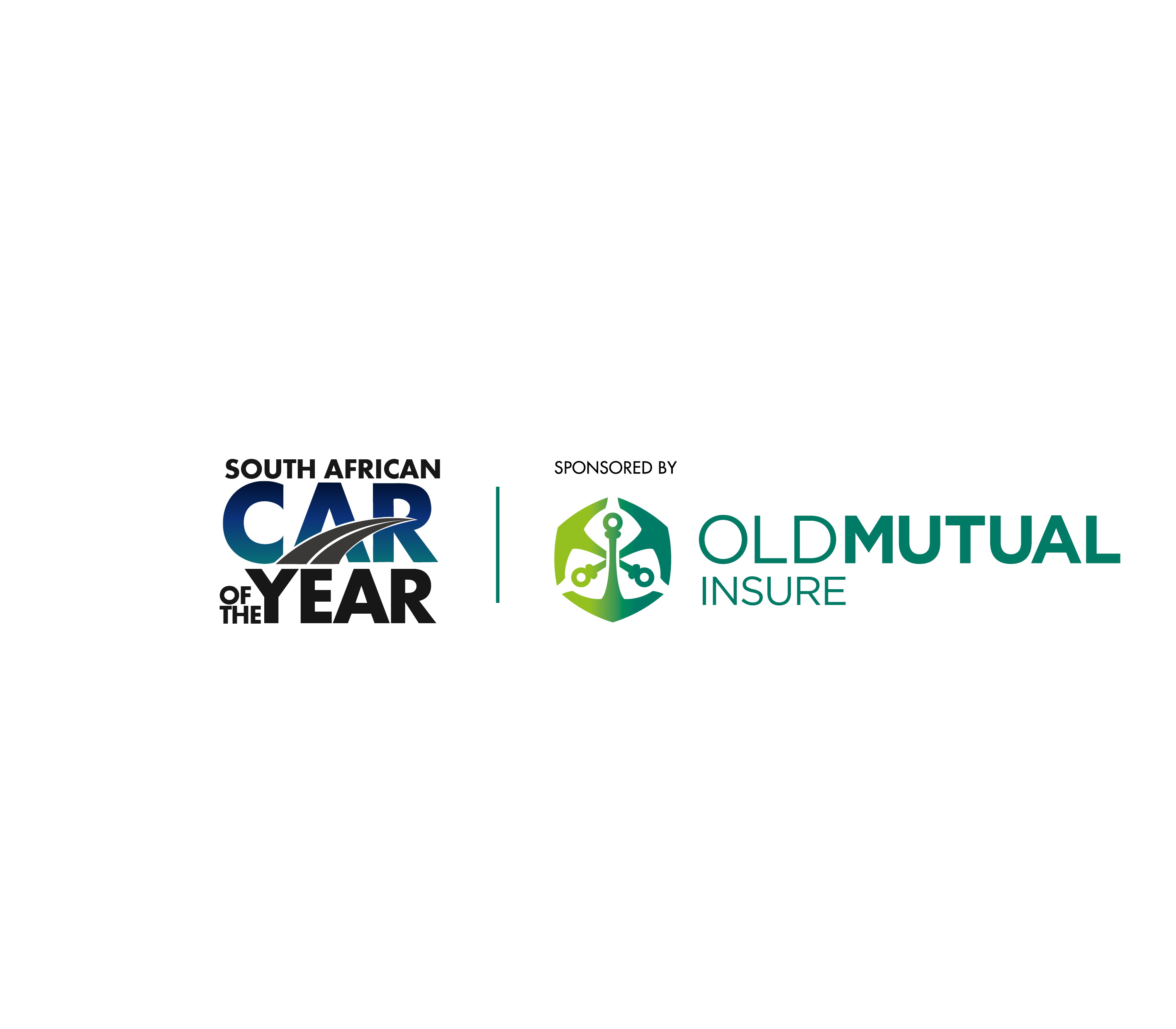

The South African Car of the Year is an annual Car of the Year award organised by the South African Guild of Mobility Journalists. The award process is widely regarded for its attention to depth and detail. The vehicles that are selected as finalists are thoroughly tested and driven for a number of days by the journalists before the winner is chosen based upon the journalist's scores.

== Recipients of the award ==
South African Car of the Year
Year	Winner
2026	Jetour T2
2025	BMW X3
2024	BMW 7 Series
2023	Ford Ranger Double Cab 4x4
2022	Toyota Corolla Cross
2021	Peugeot 2008
2020	Jaguar I-Pace
2019	Mercedes Benz A-Class
2018	Porsche Panamera
2017	Opel Astra
2016	Volvo XC90
2015	Porsche Macan S Diesel
2014	Porsche Cayman S
2013	Porsche Boxster
2012	Hyundai Elantra 1.8 GLS
2011	VW Polo 1.6 TDI and BMW 530d
2010	VW Golf 6 1.4 TSI Comfortline
2009	Honda Accord 2.4i Executive
2008	Mazda 2 Individual
2007	Honda Civic 1.8 VXi
2006	Audi A3 Sportback 2.0T FSI
2005	Volvo S40
2004	Renault Mégane 1.9 dCi
2003	VW Polo 1.4 TDI
2002	Audi A4 1.9 TDI
2001	BMW 320d
2000	Renault Clio 1.4 RT
1999	Alfa Romeo 156 T-Spark
1998	Ford Fiesta Fun
1997	BMW 528i
1996	Audi A4 1.8
1995	Opel Astra 160iS
1994	Opel Kadett 140
1993	BMW 316i
1992	Nissan Maxima 300 SE
1991	Opel Monza 160 GSi
1990	BMW 525i
1989	Toyota Corolla GLi Executive
1988	BMW 735i
1987	Mercedes-Benz 260
1986	Toyota Corolla Twin Cam

== Most wins by manufacturer ==
Total wins	Manufacturer	Years
8	BMW	1988, 1990, 1993, 1997, 2001, 2011, 2024, 2025
4	Opel	1991, 1994, 1995, 2017
4	Porsche	2013, 2014, 2015, 2018
3	Audi	1996, 2002, 2006
3	Toyota	1986, 1989, 2022
3	Volkswagen	2003, 2010, 2011
2	Ford	1998, 2023
2	Honda	2007, 2009
2	Mercedes-Benz	1987, 2019
2	Renault	2000, 2004
2	Volvo	2005, 2016
1	Alfa Romeo	1999
1	Hyundai	2012
1	Jaguar	2020
1	Jetour	2026
1	Mazda	2008
1	Nissan	1992
1	Peugeot	2021

== See also ==
- Car of the Year
- List of motor vehicle awards
