= Jaguar I-Pace =

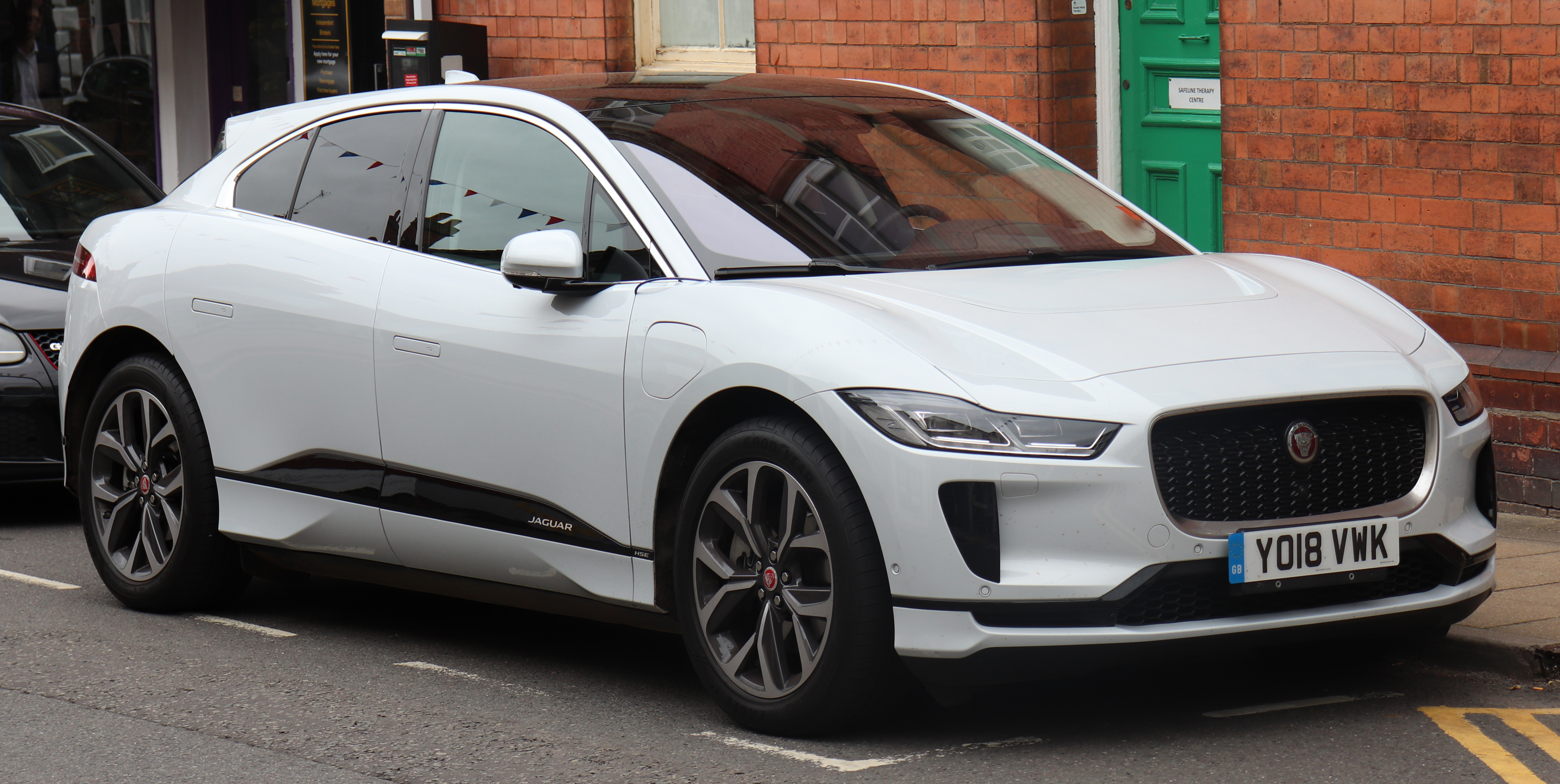

Overview
- Manufacturer: Jaguar Land Rover
- Production: 2018–2024
- Assembly: Austria: Graz (Magna Steyr)
- Designer: Ian Callum

Body and chassis
- Class: Executive car
- Body style: 5-door hatchback
- Layout: Dual-motor, all-wheel-drive
- Platform: JLR D7e

Powertrain
- Electric motor: Permanent magnet synchronous motor x2 200 PS (147 kW) 348 N⋅m (257 lbf⋅ft) (total 400 PS (294 kW) 696 N⋅m (513 lbf⋅ft))
- Transmission: 1-speed direct-drive reduction
- Battery: 90 kW·h lithium ion
- Electric range: EPA: 246 miles (396 km); WLTP: 292 miles (470 km)
- Plug-in charging: 11kW AC (7.4kW "1-phase/32A only" AC 2018–2020); 100 kW DC

Dimensions
- Wheelbase: 2,990 mm (117.7 in)
- Length: 4,682 mm (184.3 in)
- Width: 1,895 mm (74.6 in) (body); 2,011 mm (79.2 in) (mirrors folded); 2,139 mm (84.2 in) (mirrors unfolded)
- Height: 1,565 mm (61.6 in)
- Kerb weight: 2,133 kg (4,702 lb)

The Jaguar I-Pace (stylised as I-PACE) is a battery-electric car produced by Jaguar Land Rover (JLR) under their Jaguar marque. A five-door executive car with a hatchback, the I-Pace was announced in March 2018, with European deliveries beginning in June 2018 and North American deliveries starting in October 2018. The I-Pace was discontinued in 2024 due to slowing sales and a change in corporate vision.

== Development ==
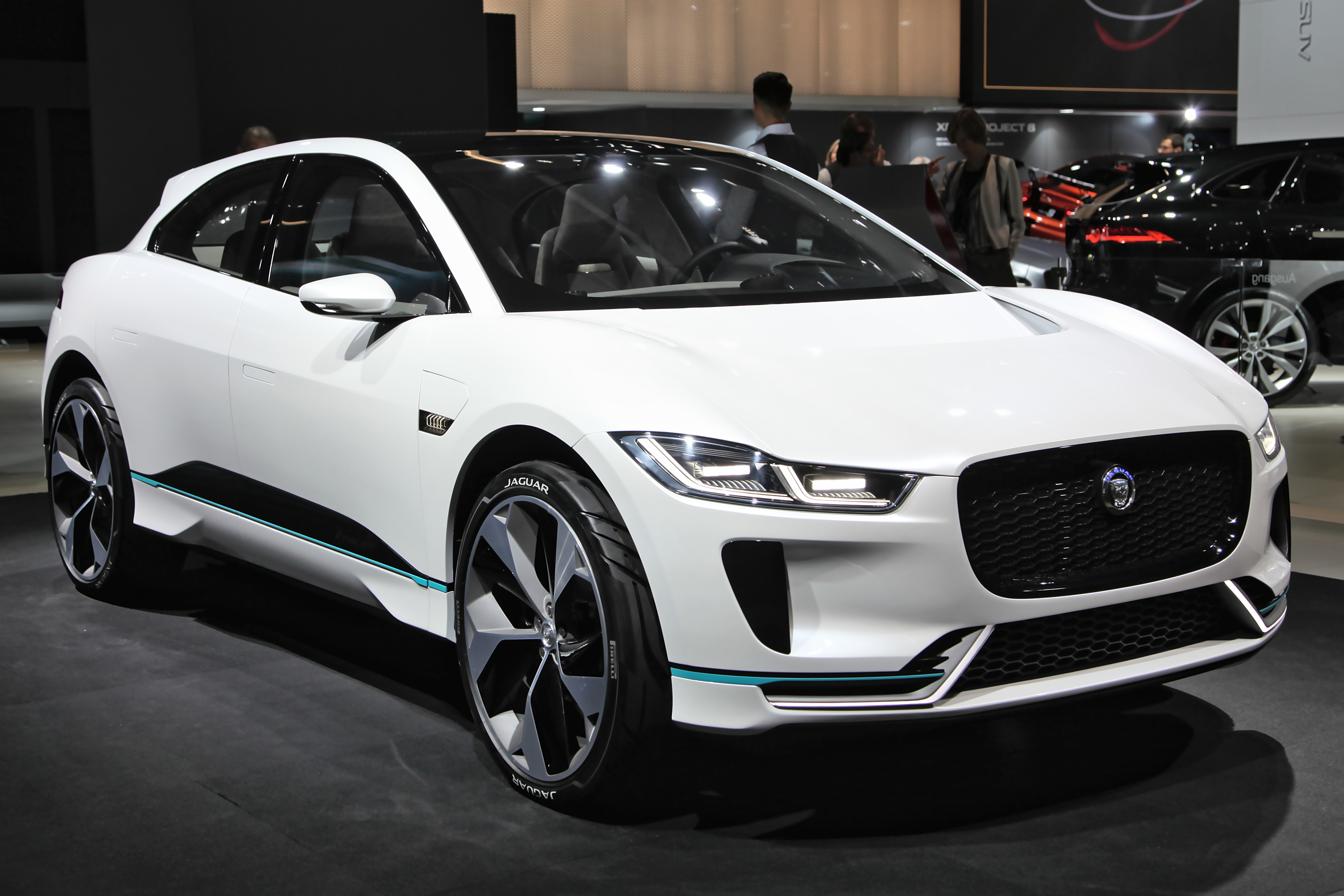
I-Pace concept car

The Jaguar I-Pace was designed by Ian Callum. The concept version of the car, described as a five-seater sports car, was unveiled by JLR at the 2016 Los Angeles Motor Show and shown on-road in London in March, 2017.

The I-Pace is built by contract manufacturer Magna Steyr in Graz, Austria, and the production version of the I-Pace was revealed in Graz on 1 March 2018. It was subsequently showcased for its first public appearance in its production version at the 2018 Geneva International Motor Show.

Some of the electric drive technology has come out of the Jaguar I-Type electric Formula E racing car programme.

== Overview ==
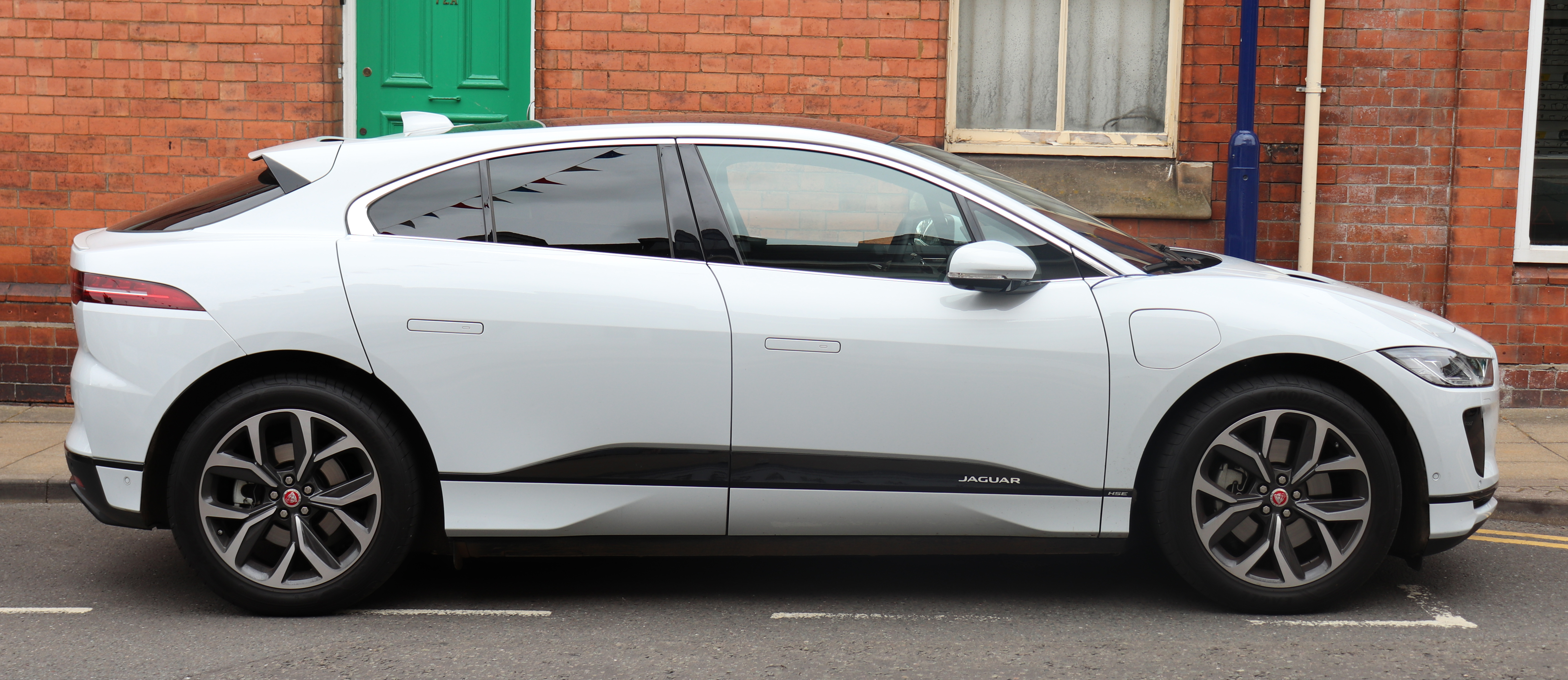
2018MY side

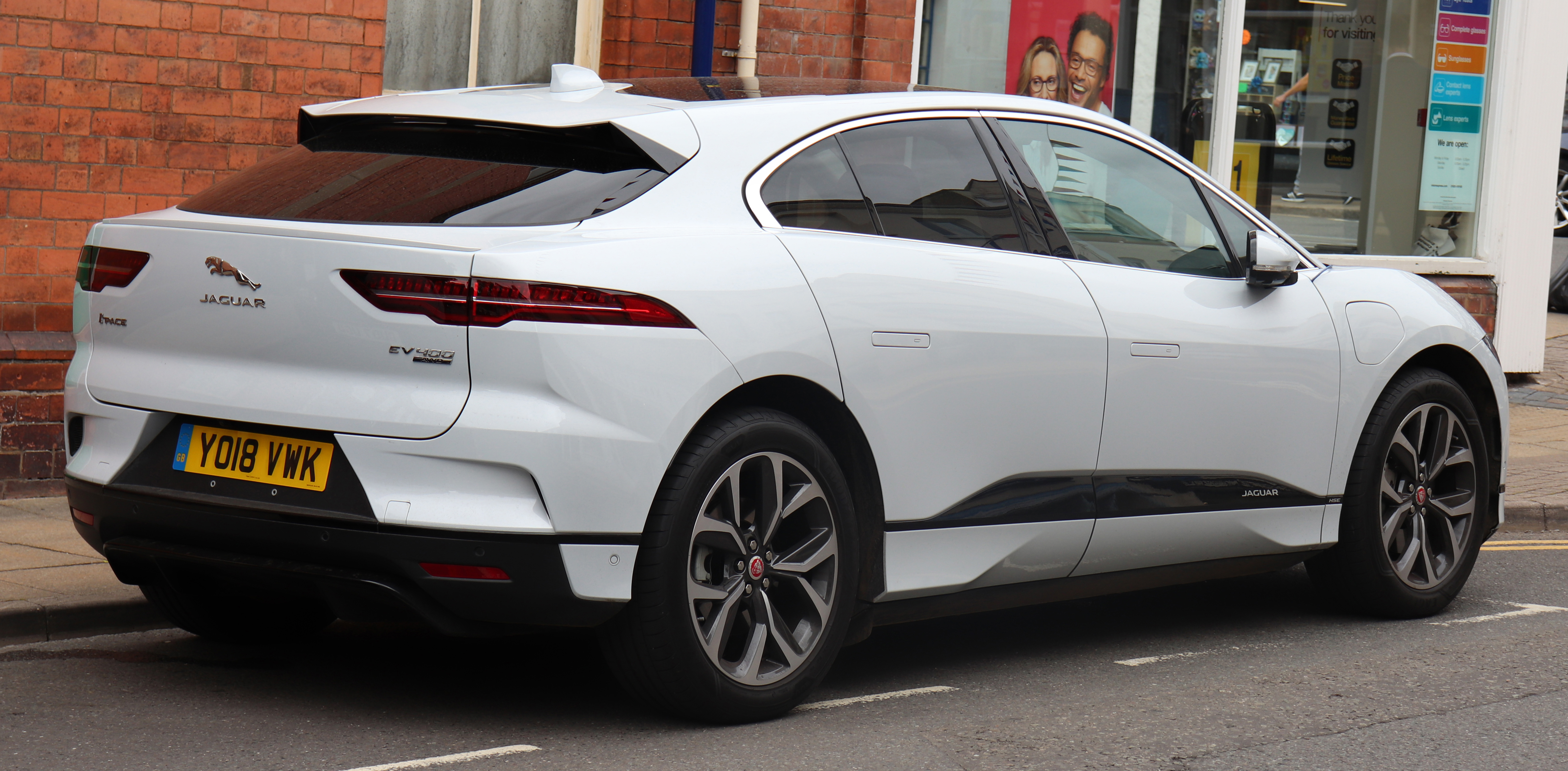
2018MY rear

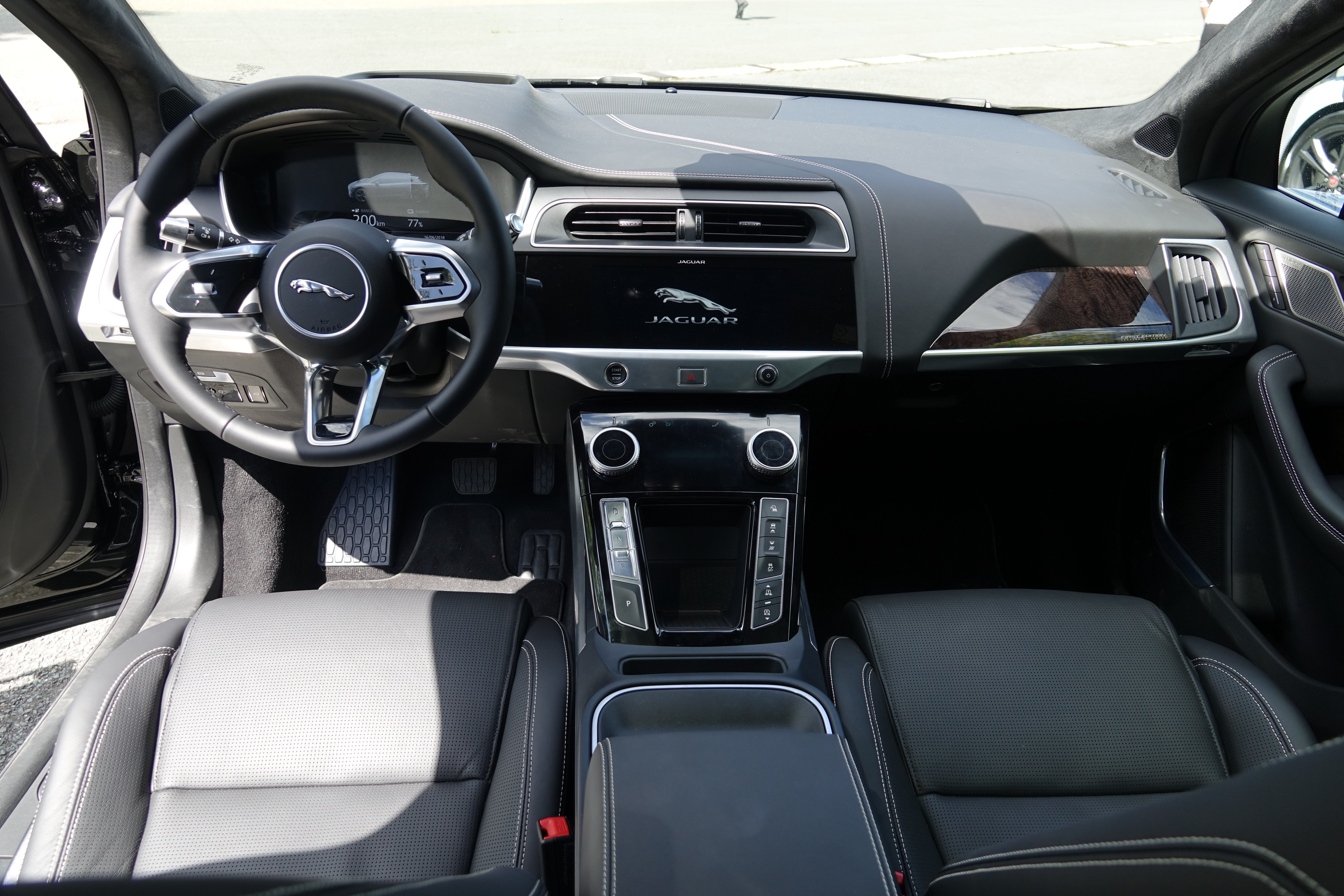
Interior

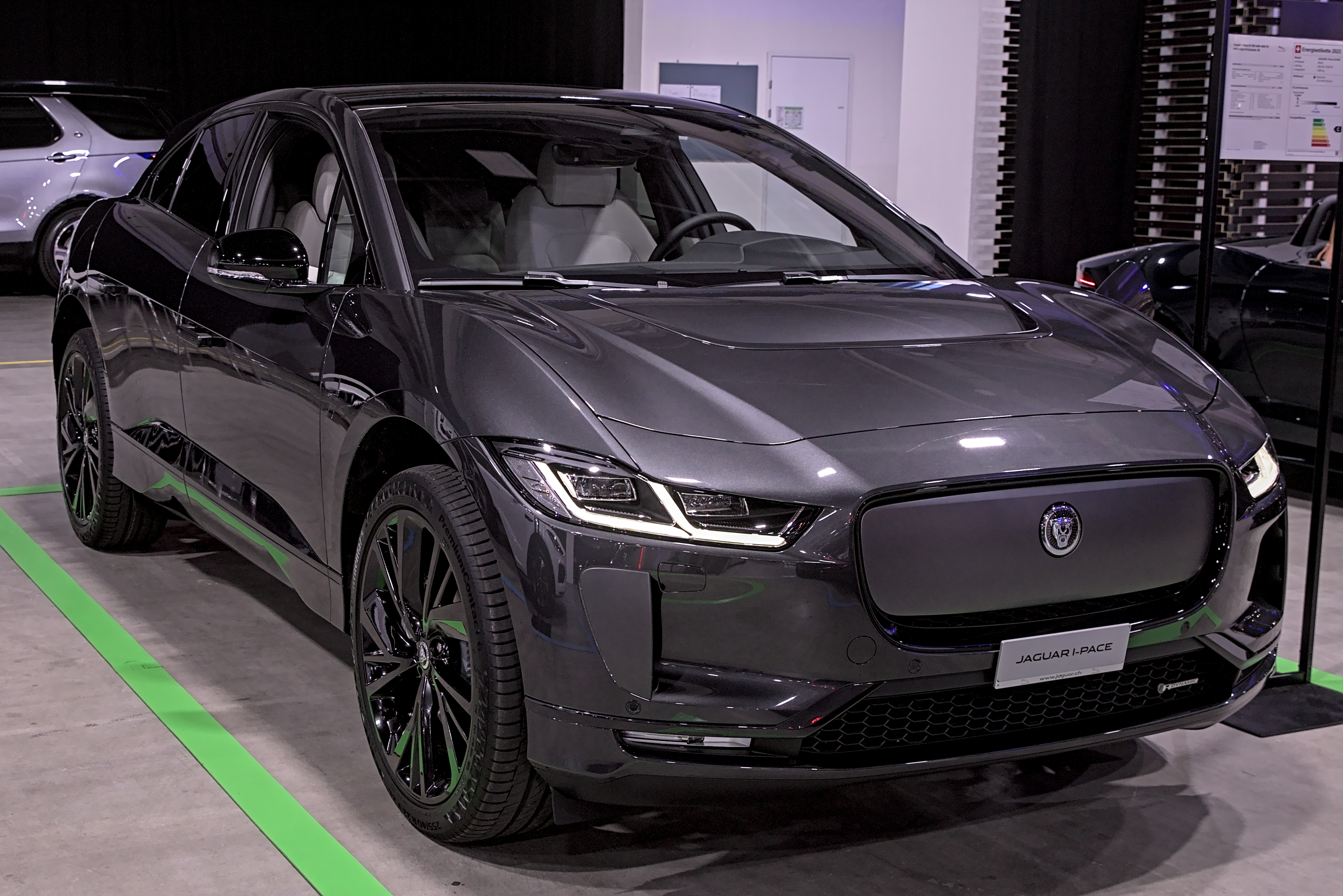
2023 Facelift

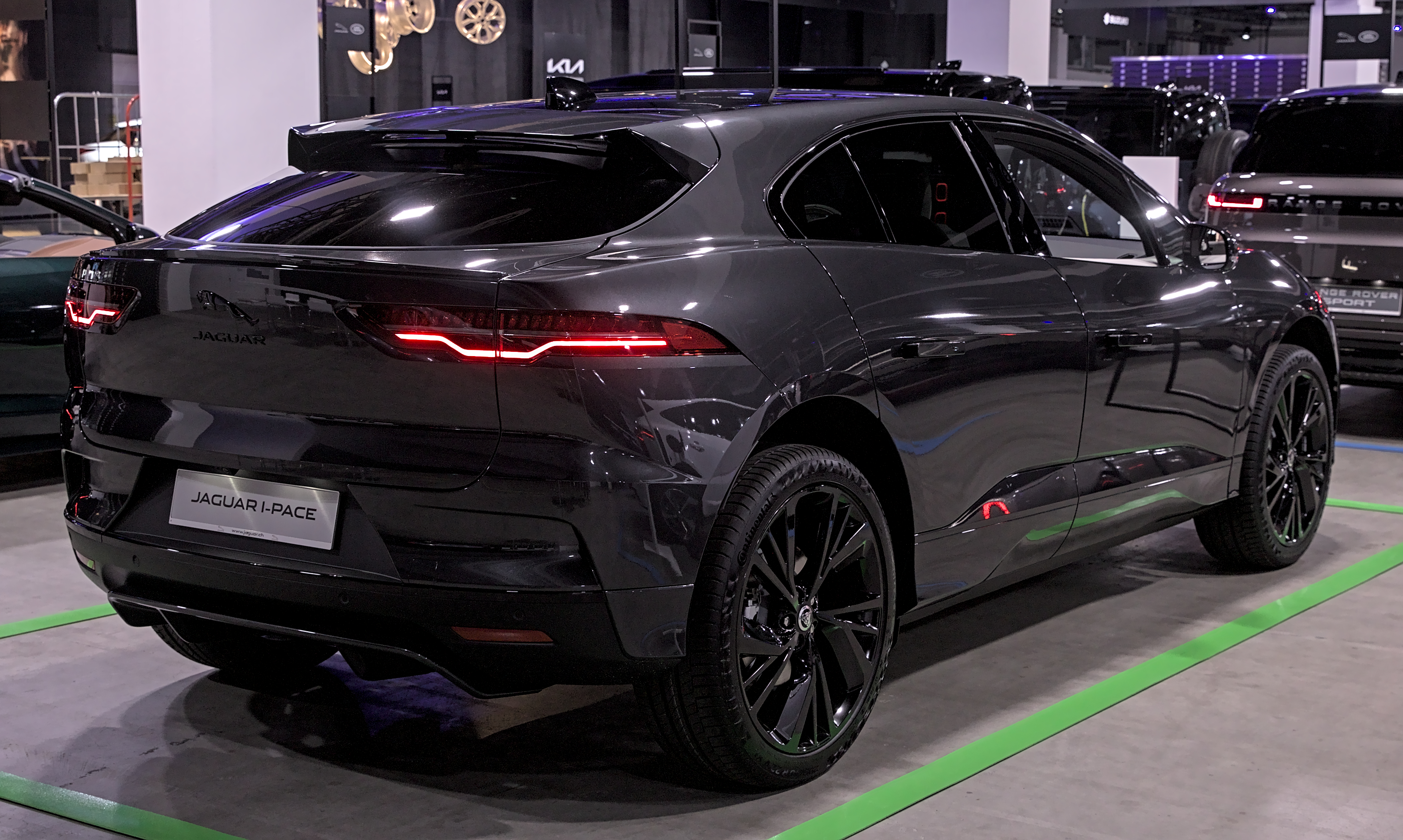
Rear view

The car has a five-door hatchback body, and is classified as an executive car by Euro NCAP and as a medium SUV by the Australasian New Car Assessment Programme.

The Jaguar I-Pace launched with a WLTP-rated range of 292 miles (470 km) and an EPA-rated range of 234 miles (377 km). In December 2019, software enhancements were released to increase range to an EPA-rated range of 246 miles (396 km). The car can ford water up to 500 mm (20 in) deep. The rear boot holds 656 litres (23 cu ft), along with 28 litres (1 cu ft) of front boot space. The drag coefficient is 0.29.

The car has all-wheel drive via two motors powered by a 90 kWh LG Chem liquid cooled lithium-ion battery. Each motor delivers 197 hp (147 kW) and 258 lb⋅ft (350 N⋅m) of torque, for a total power of 395 hp (295 kW) and total torque of 516 lb⋅ft (700 N⋅m). The 0–62 mph (0–100 km/h) time is 4.8 seconds, and the top speed is electronically limited to 124 mph (200 km/h).

The battery contains 432 pouch cells. It can charge from 0 to 80 per cent in 85 minutes using 50 kW DC charging, or 45 minutes using a 100 kW charger. Home charging with an AC wall box (7 kW) achieves the same state of charge in 10 hours. As the I-Pace was initially released with a single-phase 7 kW AC charger, a one-hour charge, would add around 30 km (19 miles) of range. Later 2021 models had 11 kW AC charging, at single-phase or three-phase, depending on market.

The car comes with a smartphone app called Jaguar Remote, which can locate the car, report on its locking, alarming and charging status, and start its battery preconditioning or cabin heating/cooling.

== Awards ==
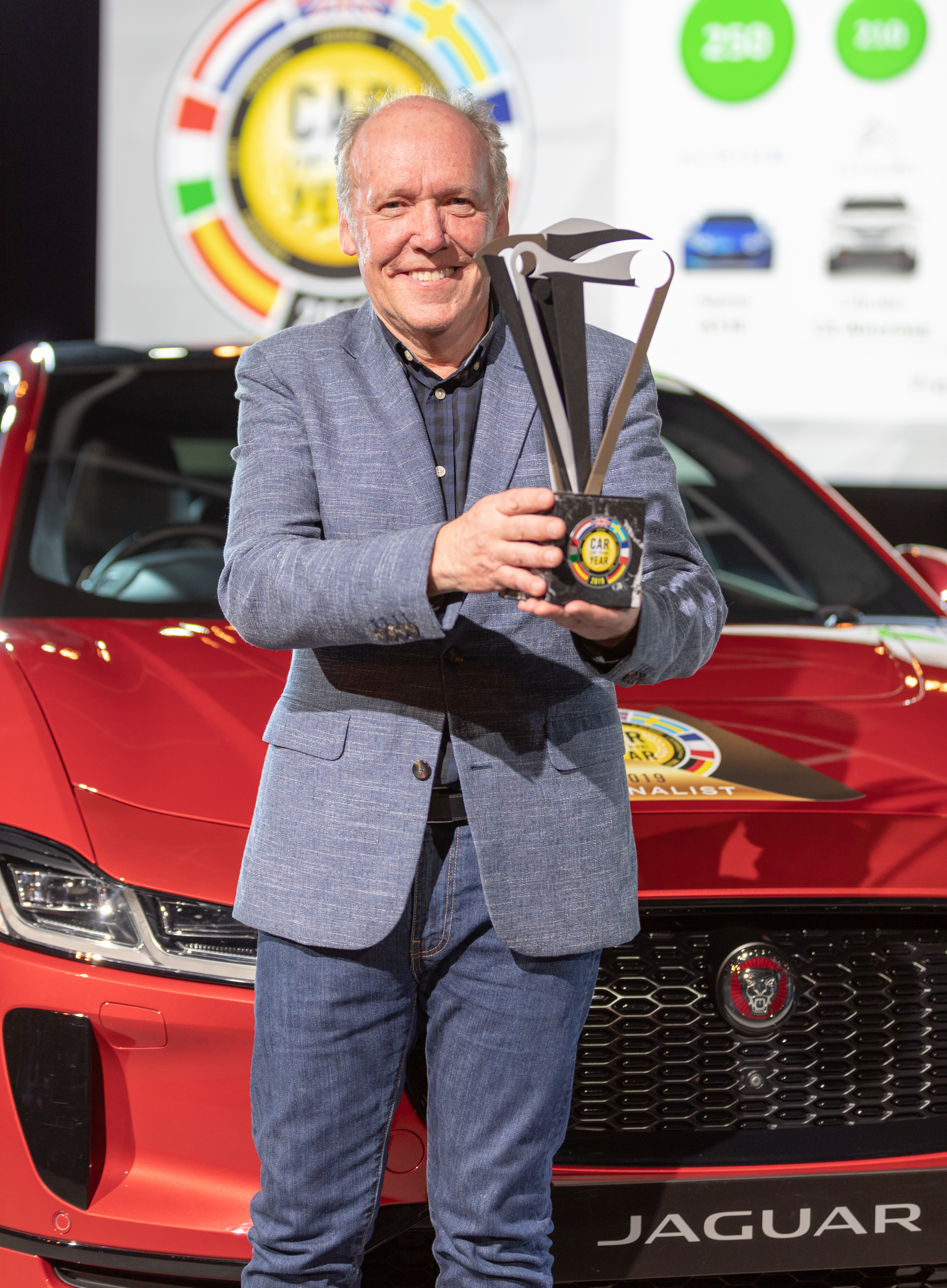
Jaguar Chief of Design Ian Callum holds 2019 European Car of the Year trophy for the Jaguar I-Pace

The I-Pace has won 62 international awards. In March 2019, it won the European Car of the Year award, the first Jaguar to win the award. In April 2019, it became the 2019 World Car of the Year, and won Best Design and Best Green Car awards.

Accolades awarded to the Jaguar I-Pace
Organisation	Year	Award	Result	Ref.
World Car Awards	2019	World Car of the Year	Won	
World Car Awards	2019	World Car Design of the Year	Won	
World Car Awards	2019	World Green Car	Won	
European Car of the Year	2019	Car of the Year	Won	
UK Car of the Year	2019	Car of the Year	Won	
German Car of the Year	2019	Car of the Year	Won	
Norwegian Car of the Year	2019	Car of the Year	Won	
China Car of the Year	2019	Green Car of the Year	Won	
Automobile Journalists of Canada	2019	Utility Vehicle of the Year	Won	
Automobile Journalists of Canada	2020	Utility Vehicle of the Year	Won	
South African Guild of Mobility Journalists	2020	South African Car of the Year	Won	
Top Gear	2018	EV of the Year	Won	
AUTOBEST	2018	Ecobest	Won	
MotorWeek	2019	Best of the Year	Won	

== Safety ==
In December 2018, the European New Car Assessment Programme (NCAP) awarded the Jaguar I-Pace a 5-star safety rating.

Euro NCAP test results* Jaguar I-Pace (2018)
Test	Points	%
Overall:	5 /5 stars	
Adult occupant:	34.8	91%
Child occupant:	40.0	81%
Pedestrian:	35.3	73%
Safety assist:	10.6	81%

ANCAP test results* Jaguar I-Pace (2018, aligned with Euro NCAP)
Test	Points	%
Overall:	5 /5 stars	
Adult occupant:	34.7	91%
Child occupant:	39.8	81%
Pedestrian:	35.3	73%
Safety assist:	10	77%

== Jaguar I-Pace eTrophy ==
=== Racing car ===
The Jaguar I-Pace has a race-prepped version called the I-Pace eTrophy, a development of the I-Pace by Jaguar's Special Vehicle Operations.

=== Racing series ===
In September 2017, Jaguar announced their single-make racing series for the I-Pace, called eTrophy, after the racing car of the same name.

On 24 August 2018, the Jaguar I-Pace set a new EV lap record at the Laguna Seca race circuit in California.

== Sales ==
Year	Europe	United States
2018	6,490	393
2019	12,232	2,979
2020	13,444	1,546
2021	8,079	1,409
2022	6,409	439
2023	8,079	1,409
2024		2,886
2025		1,651
Total	46,654	10,918

These are the total sales in two of its markets; not included are the sales figures in other markets or the thousands sold to Waymo (as detailed below).

== Partnership with Waymo for autonomous ride service ==
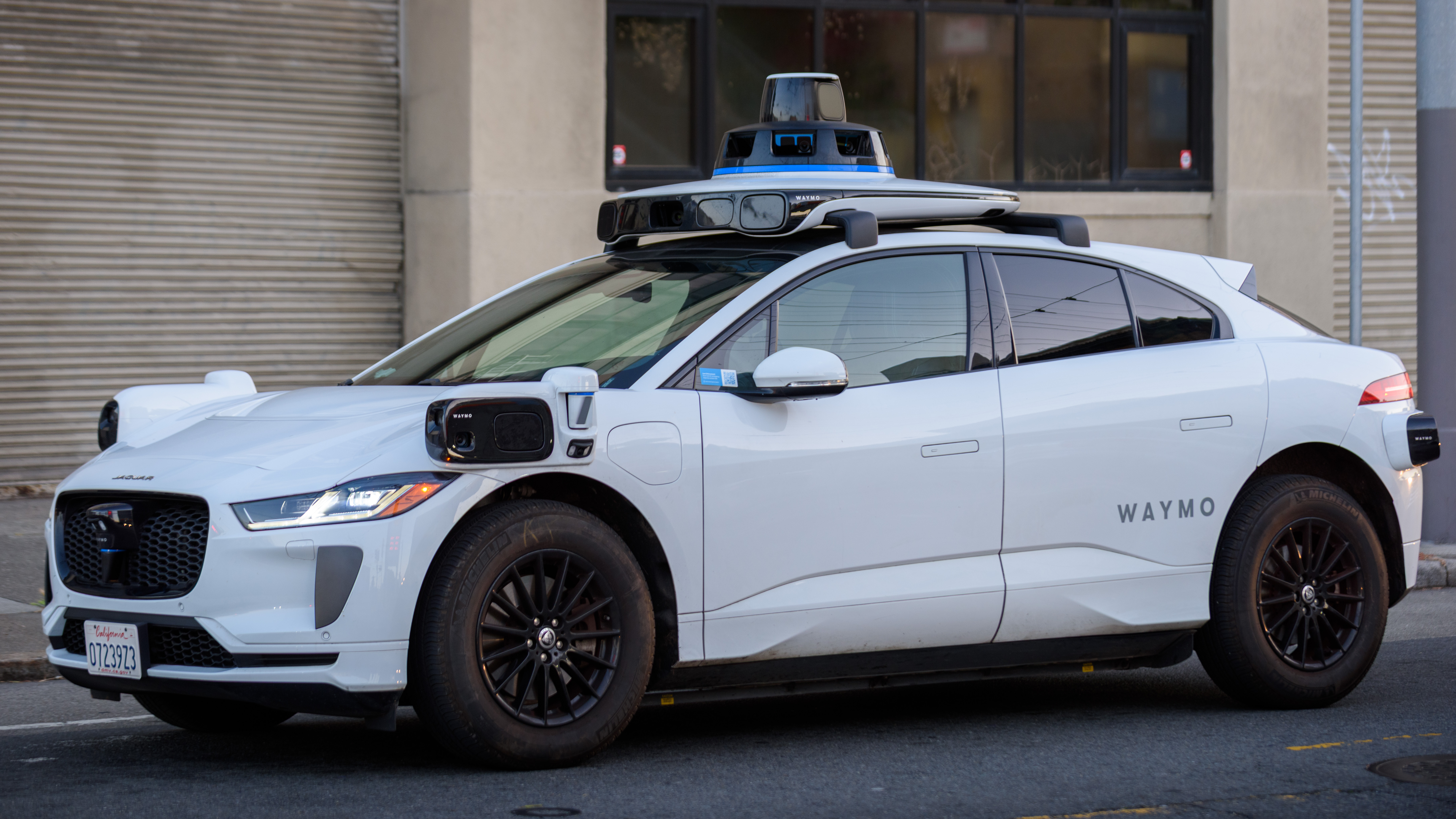
Autonomous Waymo Jaguar I-Pace.

In 2018, Waymo selected the Jaguar I-Pace for use in its autonomous ride-hailing service, placing an order for up to 20,000 vehicles. In May 2025 Waymo announced it had 1,500 autonomous vehicles (primarily the I-Pace) in operation in four American cities, and would equip "over 2,000" more I-Paces with its Waymo Driver hardware.

== Wireless charging project ==
In June 2020, Jaguar announced its support for a wirelessly charged taxi project in Oslo, Norway. Jaguar gave 25 I-Pace vehicles to taxi company Cabonline, which will use the vehicles to test the charging infrastructure on taxis in the Norwegian capital. Ralf Speth, JLR's then chief executive, said, "The taxi industry is the ideal test bed for wireless charging, and indeed for high-mileage electric mobility across the board.".
