= China Car of the Year =

Motor vehicle award

China Car of the Year is an award presented to the winning car launched in China during the course of the year. The first year of the awards was 2014. It is judged by an independent panel made up of automotive journalists and experts. Along with the most prestigious "Car of the Year" award.

The award has gone through several changes since 2014.

In 2015, in addition to "Car of the Year", "Performance Car of the Year", "Green Car of the Year" and "Design Car of the Year", the "SUV of the Year" was added.

In 2024, the "Green Car of the Year" was replaced by "Budget Car of the Year".

In 2025, the "Car of the Year" and "SUV of the Year" were integrated into the new "Car of the Year". The "Luxury Car of the Year" was added.

China Car of the Year winner list
Year	Car	Luxury Car	Budget Car	Performance Car	Design
2026	AUDI E5 Sportback	Nio ET9	iCAR V23	Ferrari 296 Speciale	Audi A5L
2025	AITO M9	Mercedes-Benz E-Class(W214)	Geely Galaxy E5	Hyundai Ioniq 5 N	Volkswagen ID.UNYX
Year	Car	SUV	Budget Car	Performance Car	Design
2024	BMW i7	Genesis GV60	Geely Galaxy L6	Lotus Eletre R+	Aston Martin DB12
Year	Car	SUV	Green Car	Performance Car	Design
2023	Mercedes-Benz EQE	Tank 500	Audi Q4 e-tron	Ferrari 296 GTB/GTS	Maserati Grecale
2022	Mercedes-Benz S-Class(W223)	Geely Xingyue L	Volkswagen ID.4	Audi RS Q8	Genesis G80
2021	Geely Preface	Lincoln Aviator (U611)	Polestar 2	Maserati MC20	Land Rover Defender
2020	Mazda3 (BP)	Mercedes-Benz GLE (W167)	Porsche Taycan	Porsche 911	Bentley Flying Spur
2019	Lexus ES (XZ10)	Volkswagen Touareg (CR)	Jaguar I-Pace	Lamborghini Urus	Volvo XC40
2018	Volvo S90	Range Rover Velar	Honda CR-V Hybrid (4th gen)	Ferrari 812 Superfast	Range Rover Velar
2017	Mercedes-Benz E-Class(W213)	Bentley Bentayga	Tesla Model X	Porsche 718	Mazda CX-4
2016	Geely Borui	Volvo XC90 II	Lexus NX 300h (AZ10)	Ferrari 488 GTB	Mercedes-Benz AMG GT
2015	Honda Odyssey (RC)	Porsche Macan	BMW i3	McLaren 650S	Jaguar F-Type
Year	Car	-	Green Car	Performance Car	Design
2014	Mercedes-Benz S-Class(W222)	-	Porsche Panamera E-Hybrid (970)	Porsche 918 Spyder	DS 5

== 2026 Awards ==
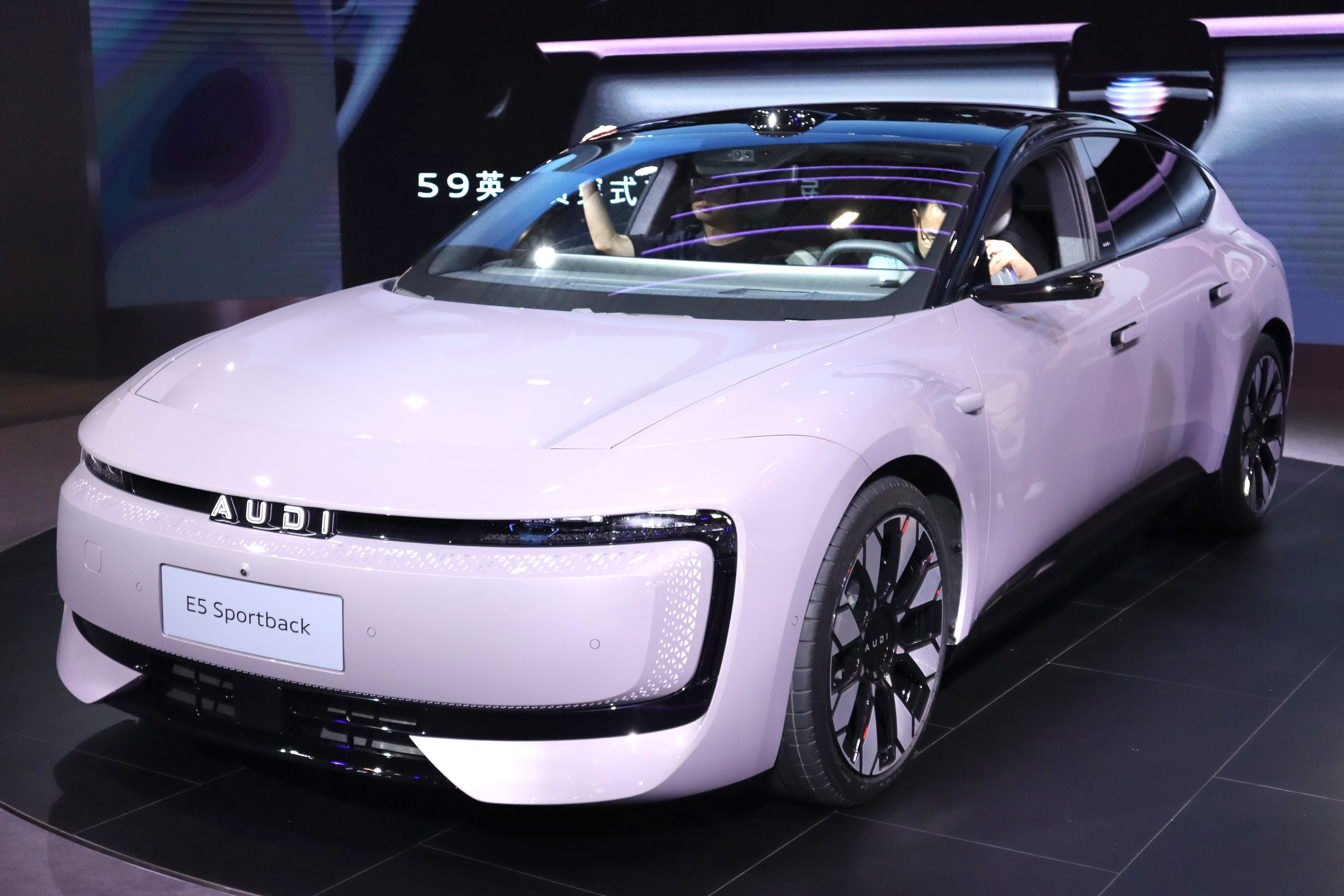
AUDI E5 Sportback

The 2026 awards was announced in January 2026.

- AUDI E5 Sportback - Car of the Year
- Nio ET9 - Luxury Car of the Year
- iCAR V23 - Budget Car of the Year
- Ferrari 296 Speciale - Performance Car of the Year
- Audi A5L - Design Car of the Year

== 2025 Awards ==
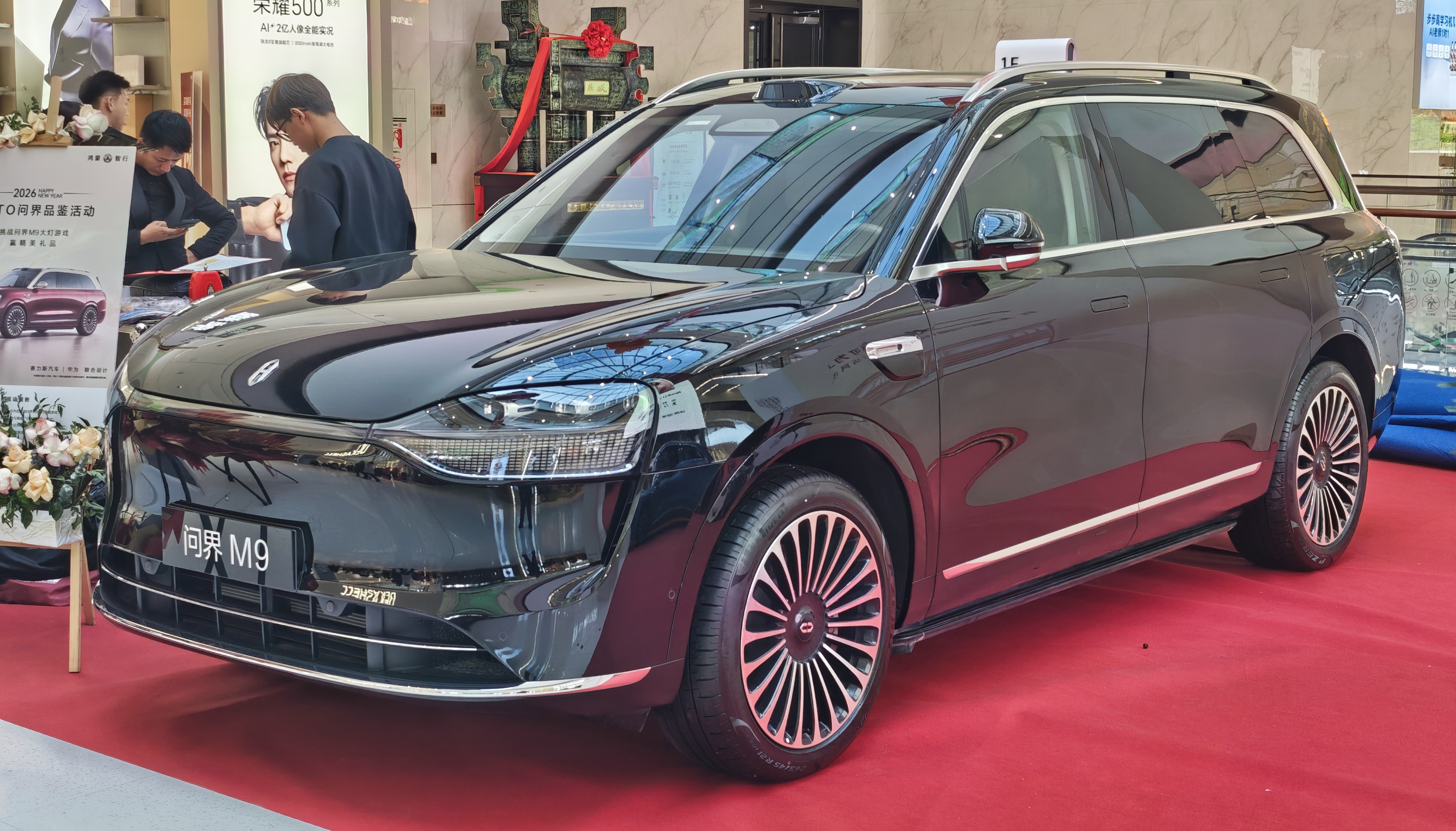
AITO M9

The 2025 awards was announced in December 2024. The "Car of the Year" and "SUV of the Year" were integrated into the new "Car of the Year". The "Luxury Car of the Year" was added.

- AITO M9 - Car of the Year
- Mercedes-Benz S-Class - Luxury Car of the Year
- Geely Galaxy E5 - Budget Car of the Year
- Hyundai Ioniq 5 N - Performance Car of the Year
- Volkswagen ID.UNYX - Design Car of the Year

== 2024 Awards ==
The 2024 awards was announced in December 2023. "The Green Car of the Year" was replaced by "Budget Car of the Year".

- BMW i7 - Car of the Year
- Genesis GV60 - SUV of the Year
- Geely Galaxy L6 - Budget Car of the Year
- Lotus Eletre R+ - Performance Car of the Year
- Aston Martin DB12 - Design Car of the Year

== 2023 Awards ==
- Mercedes-Benz EQE - Car of the Year
- Tank 500 - SUV of the Year
- Audi Q4 e-tron - Green Car of the Year
- Ferrari 296 GTB/GTS - Performance Car of the Year
- Maserati Grecale - Design Car of the Year

== 2022 Awards ==
- Mercedes-Benz S-Class - Car of the Year
- Geely Xinyue L - SUV of the Year
- Volkswagen ID.4 - Green Car of the Year
- Audi RS Q8 - Performance Car of the Year
- Genesis G80 - Design Car of the Year

== 2021 Awards ==
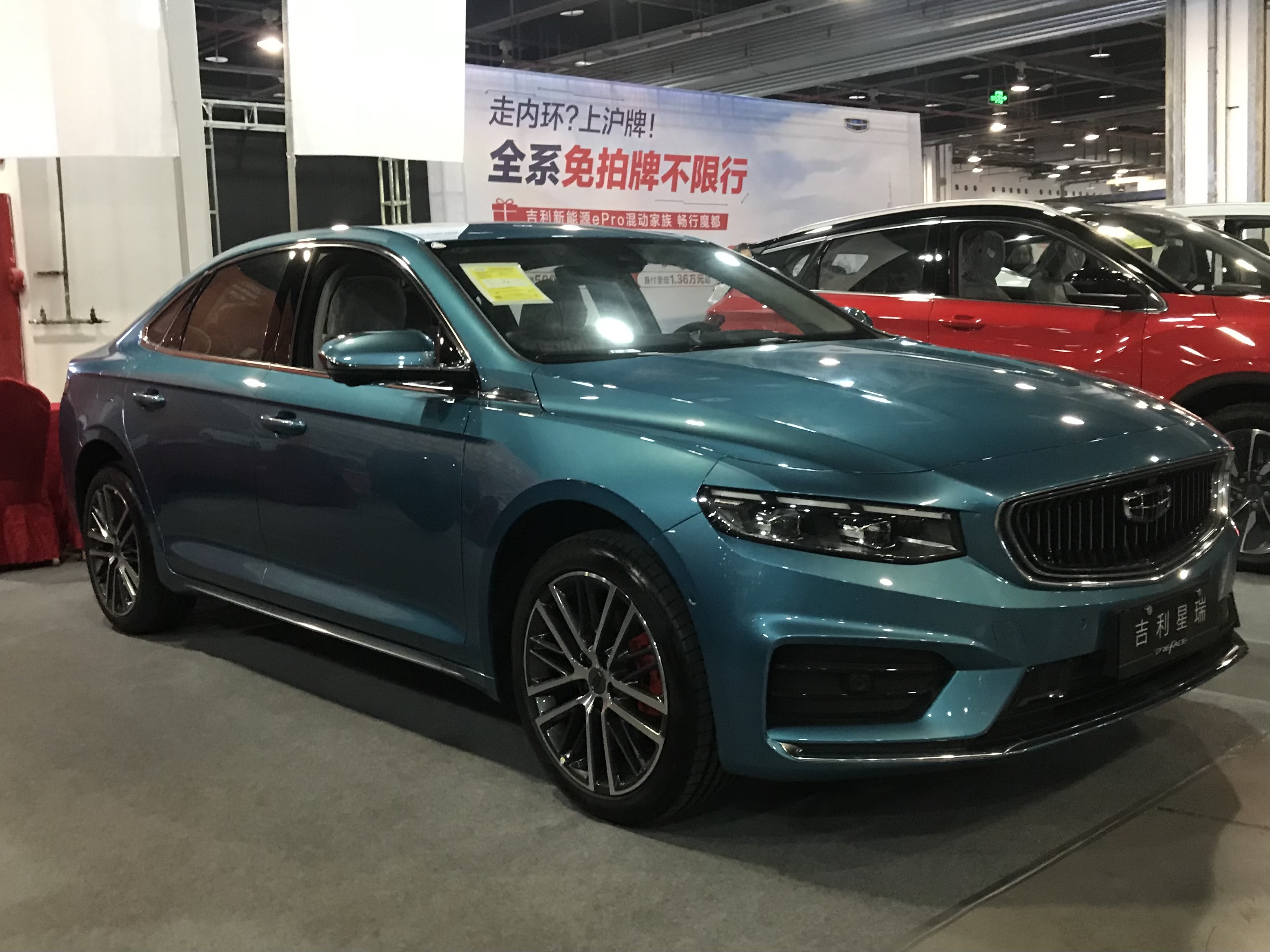
Geely Preface

The 2021 awards were announced at Guangzhou Auto Show on 20 November 2020.

- Geely Preface - Car of the Year
- Lincoln Aviator - SUV of the Year
- Polestar 2 Green - Car of the Year
- Maserati MC20 - Performance Car of the Year
- Land Rover Defender - Design Car of the Year

== 2020 Awards ==
The 2020 awards were announced on 21 November 2019 at the Guangzhou Auto Show.

- Mazda3 - Car of the Year
- Mercedes-Benz GLE - SUV of the Year
- Porsche Taycan - Green Car of the Year
- Porsche 911 - Performance Car of the Year
- Bentley Flying Spur - Design Car of the Year

== 2019 Awards ==
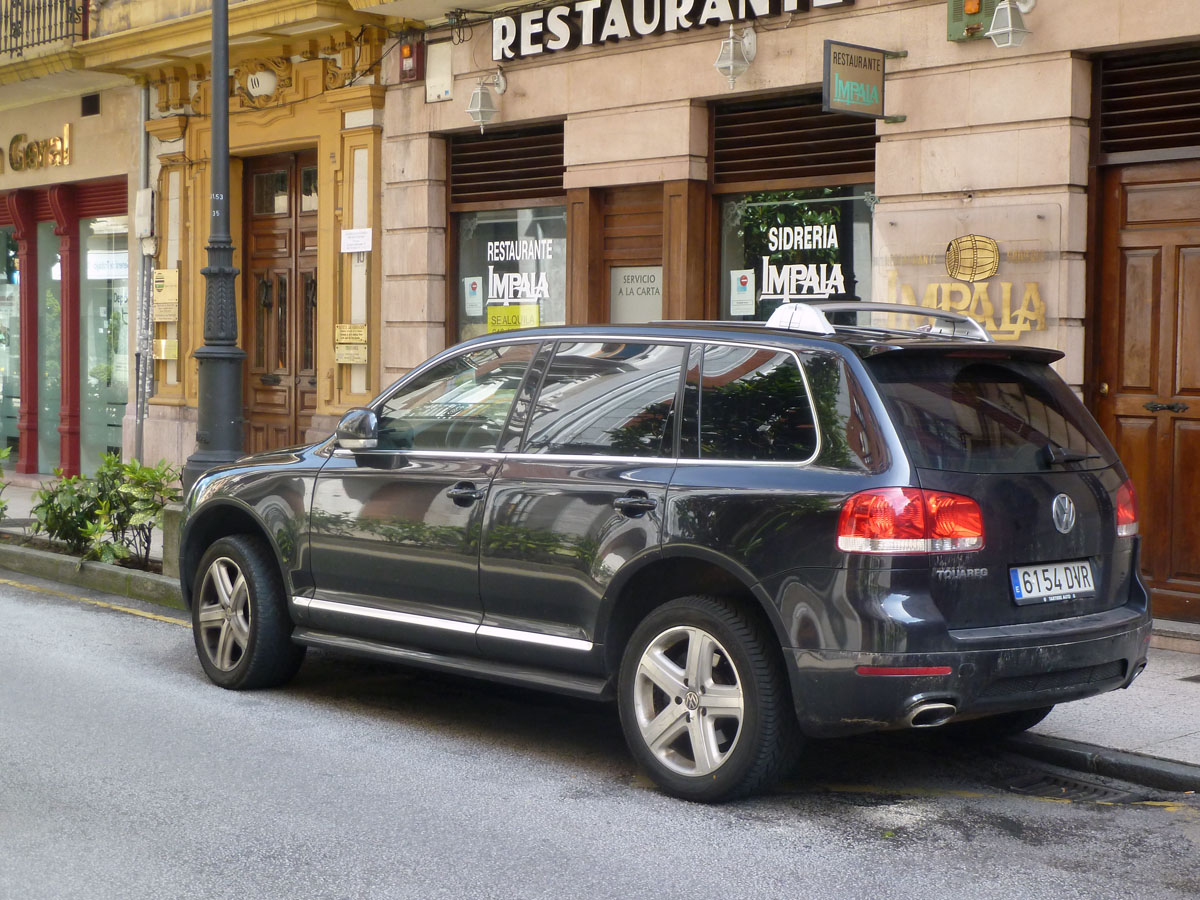
Volkswagen Touareg

- Lexus ES - Car of the Year
- Volkswagen Touareg - SUV of the Year
- Jaguar I-Pace - Green Car of the Year
- Lamborghini Urus - Performance Car of the Year
- Volvo XC40 - Design Car of the Year

== 2018 Awards ==
- Volvo S90 - Car of the Year
- Range Rover Velar - SUV of the Year
- Honda CR-V Hybrid - Green of the Year
- Ferrari 812 Superfast - Performance Car of the Year
- Range Rover Velar - Design Car of the Year

== 2017 Awards ==
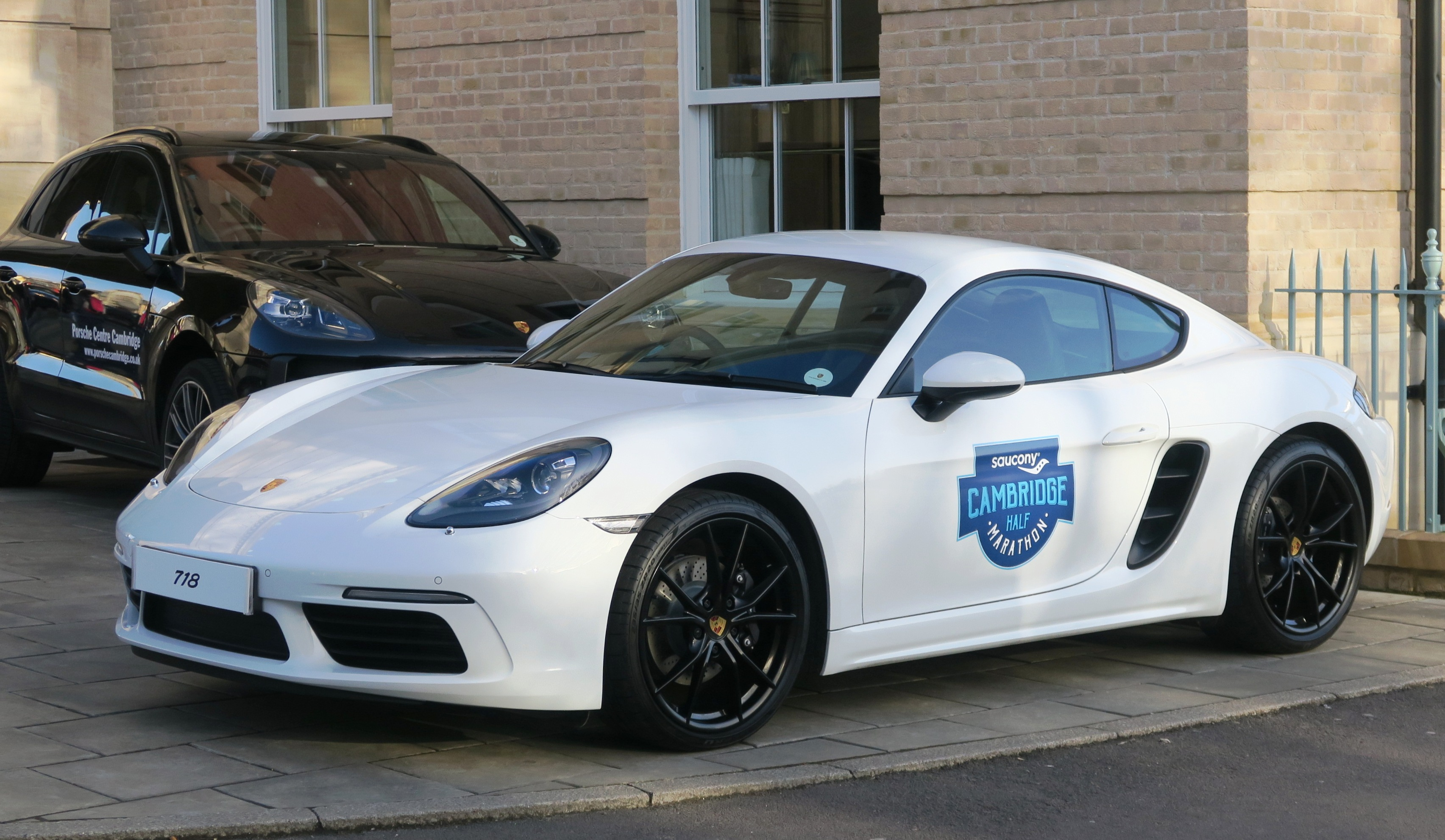
Porsche 718 Cayman

- Mercedes-Benz E-Class LWB - Car of the Year
- Tesla Model X - Green Car of the Year
- Mazda CX-4 - Design Car of the Year
- Porsche 718 - Performance Car of the Year
- Bentley Bentayga - SUV of the Year

== 2016 Awards ==
- Geely Borui - Car of the Year
- Lexus NX 300h - Green Car of the Year
- Mercedes-Benz AMG GT S - Design Car of the Year
- Ferrari 488 GTB - Performance Car of the Year
- Volvo XC90 - SUV of the Year

== 2015 Awards ==
- Honda Odyssey - Car of the Year
- BMW i3 Range Extended - Green Car of the Year
- Jaguar F-Type - Car Design of the Year
- McLaren 650S - Performance Car of the Year
- Porsche Macan - SUV of the Year

== 2014 Awards ==
The 2014 Awards was the first year of the China Car of the Year. The Mercedes-Benz S-Class took the award, with the Range Rover and Ford Mondeo coming second and third.

- Mercedes-Benz S-Class - Car of the Year
- Porsche Panamera - E-Hybrid Green Car of the Year
- DS 5 - Design Car of the Year
- Porsche 918 Spyder - Performance Car of the Year

== Statistics ==
Winners by brand
Brand	Group	Total	Car	SUV	Luxury	Budget	Green	Performance	Design
Mercedes-Benz	Mercedes-Benz	7	4	1	1				1
Porsche	Volkswagen	6		1			2	3	
Geely	Geely	5	2	1		2			
Volvo	Geely	3	1	1					1
Ferrari	Ferrari	4						4	
Land Rover	Tata	3		1					2
Volkswagen	Volkswagen	3		1			1		1
Audi	Volkswagen	3					1	1	1
BMW	BMW	2	1				1		
Bentley	Volkswagen	2		1					1
Lexus	Toyota	2	1				1		
Honda	Honda	2	1				1		
Mazda	Mazda	2	1						1
Genesis	Hyundai	2		1					1
Jaguar	Tata	2					1		1
Maserati	Stellantis	2						1	1
AITO	Seres	1	1						
Lamborghini	Volkswagen	1						1	
Lotus	Geely	1						1	
Tank	GWM	1		1					
Polestar	Geely	1					1		
DS	Stellantis	1							1
McLaren	McLaren	1						1	
Aston Martin	Aston Martin	1							1
Tesla	Tesla	1					1		
Lincoln	Ford	1		1					
Hyundai	Hyundai	1						1	
Nio	Nio	1			1				
AUDI	SAIC-VW	1							
iCAR	Chery	1				1			

Winners by holding group
Group	Total	Car	SUV	Luxury	Budget	Green	Performance	Design
Volkswagen	15		3			4	5	3
Geely	10	3	2		2	1	1	1
Mercedes-Benz	7	4	1	1				1
Tata	5		1			1		3
Ferrari	4						4	
Stellantis	3						1	2
Hyundai	3		1				1	1
BMW	2	1				1		
Toyota	2	1				1		
Honda	2	1				1		
Mazda	2	1						1
Seres	1	1						
McLaren	1						1	
Aston Martin	1							1
Tesla	1					1		
Ford	1		1					
GWM	1		1					
SAIC-VW	1	1						
Nio	1			1				
Chery	1				1			
