= Mercedes-Benz C-Class =

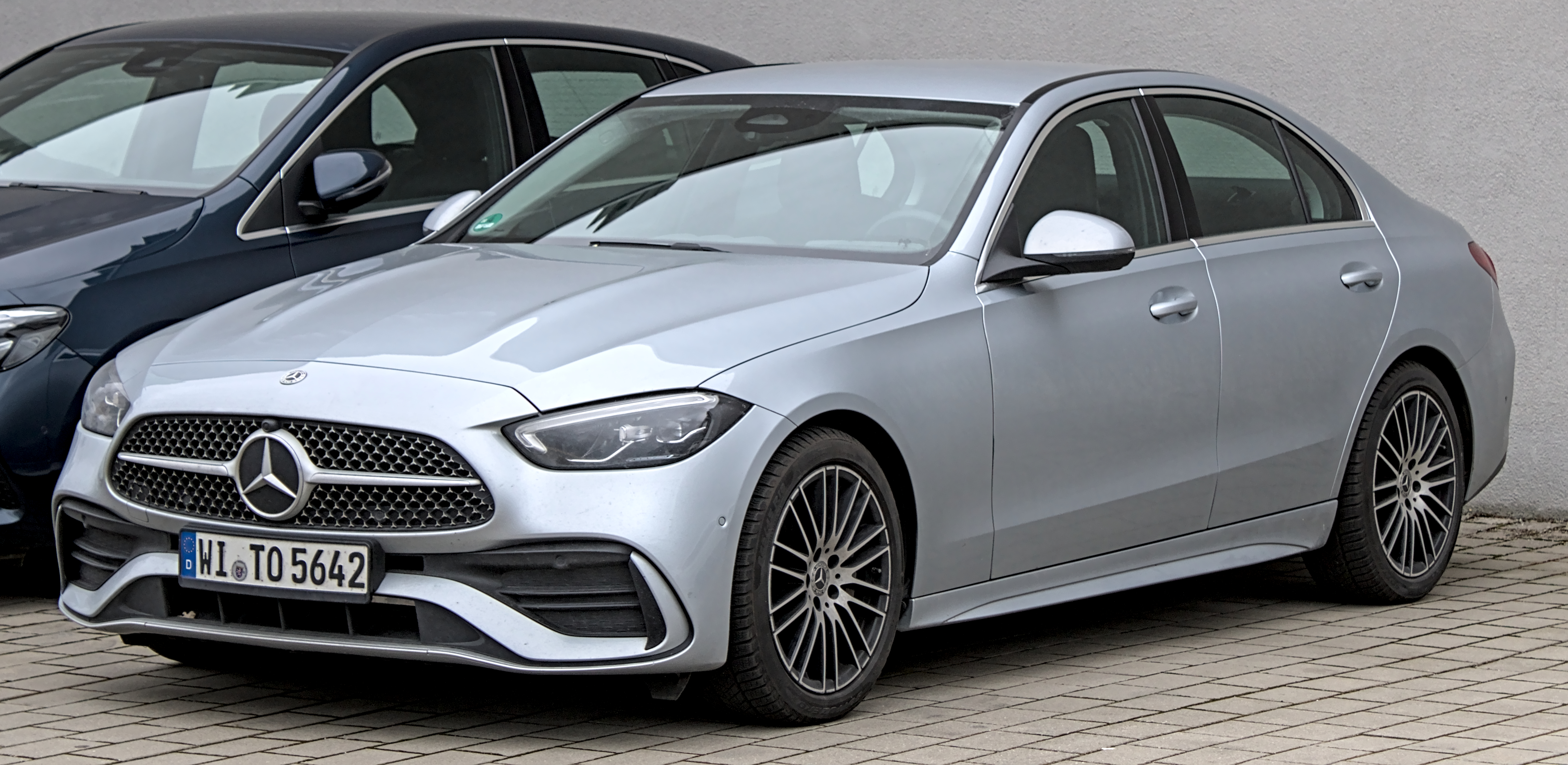
- W206 sedan

Overview
- Manufacturer: Daimler-Benz (1992–1998); DaimlerChrysler (1998–2007); Daimler AG (2007–2022); Mercedes-Benz Group AG (2022–present)
- Production: 1992–present

Body and chassis
- Class: Compact executive car (D)
- Layout: Front-engine, rear-wheel-drive or all-wheel-drive (4MATIC)

Chronology
- Predecessor: Mercedes-Benz 190 E (W201)

The Mercedes-Benz C-Class is a series of compact executive cars produced by Mercedes-Benz Group AG. Introduced in 1993 as a replacement for the 190 (W201) range, the C-Class was the smallest model in the marque's line-up until the W168 A-Class arrived in 1997. The C-Class has been available with a "4MATIC" four-wheel drive option since 2002. The third generation (W204) was launched in 2007 while the current W206 generation was launched in 2021.

The upcoming W520 was unveiled in 2026 with sales starting in 2027.

Initially available in sedan and station wagon configurations, a fastback coupé (SportCoupé) variant followed and was later renamed to Mercedes-Benz CLC-Class. It remained in production until 2011 when a new W204 C-Class coupé replaced it for the 2012 model year.

Chassis	Type	Debut
W201	"190"	1982
W202	C-Class	1993
W203	C-Class	2000
W204	C-Class	2007
W205	C-Class	2014
W206	C-Class	2021

== Predecessor models ==
=== W201 (1982) ===
W201
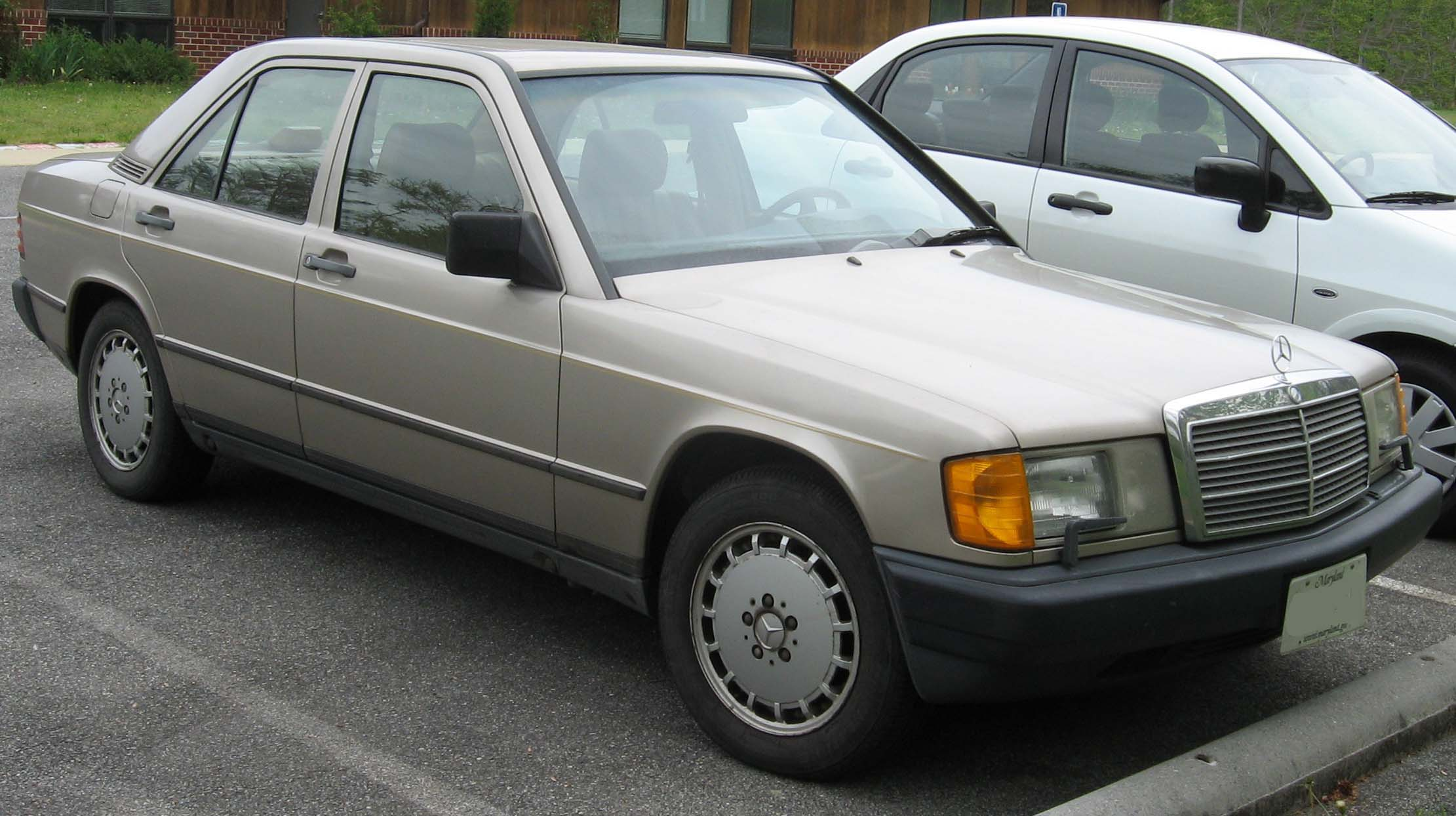
- Mercedes-Benz 190 (W201)

Overview
- Also called: 190E, 190D
- Production: September 1982 – May 1993 (W201)

Body and chassis
- Layout: FR layout

Powertrain
- Engine: Petrol: 1.8L, 2.3L, 2.5L I4; 2.6L, 3.2L I6; Diesel: 2.0L, 2.2L I4; 2.5L I5

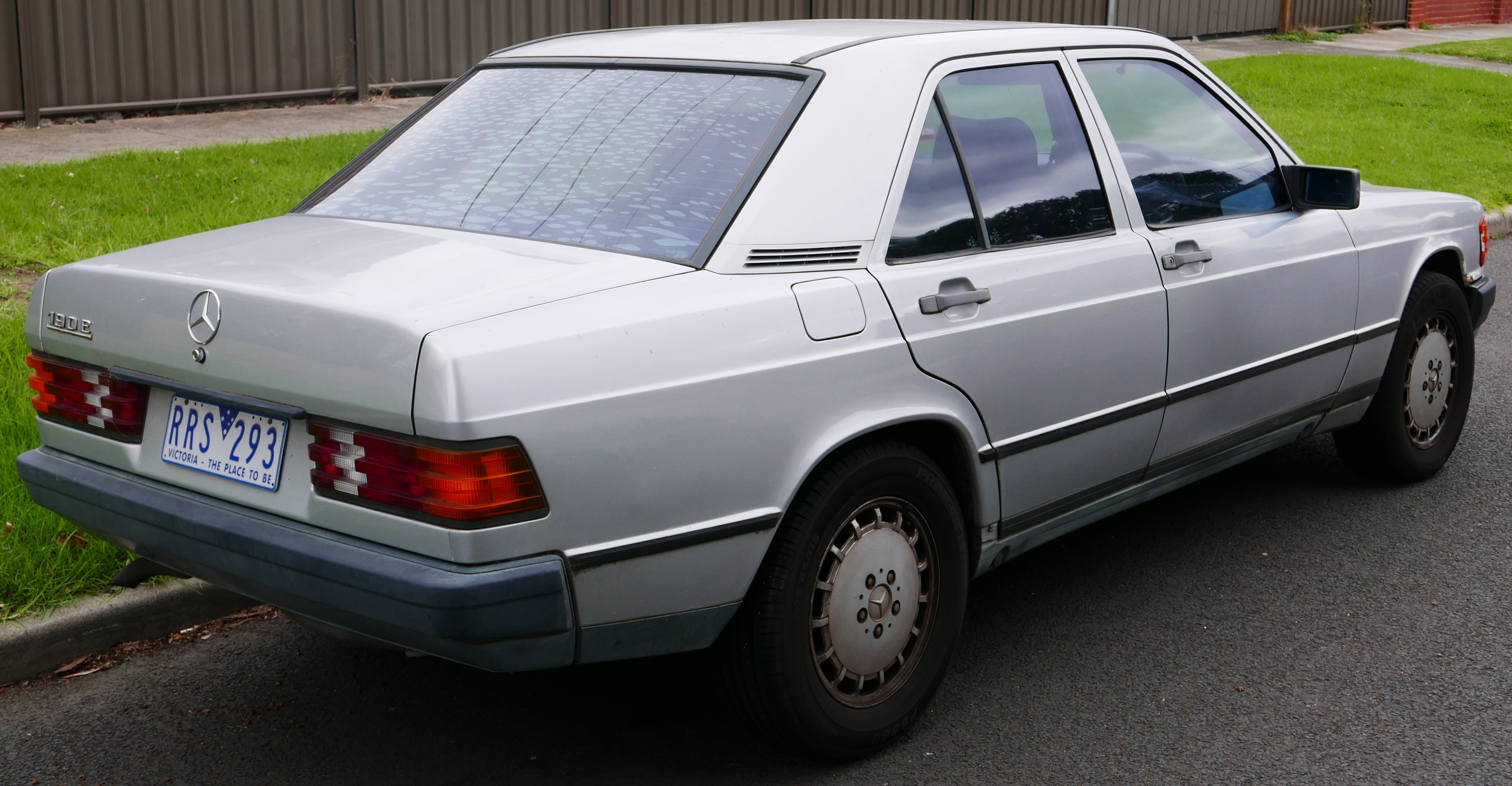
1985 Mercedes-Benz 190E W201 (Australia)

The Mercedes-Benz W201 is the internal designation for the Mercedes 190 series sedans, a range of front-engine, rear drive, five passenger, four-door sedans manufactured over a single generation, from 1982 to 1993 as the company's first compact class automobile.

Designed by Bruno Sacco, head of styling at Mercedes-Benz from 1975 to 1999, the W201 debuted at the 1982 Paris Motor Show. Manufactured in both Bremen and Sindelfingen, Germany, production reached 1,879,629 over its eleven-year model life.

The W201 introduced a 5-link rear suspension subsequently used in E and C class models, front and rear anti-roll bars, anti-dive and anti-squat geometry—as well as airbags, ABS brakes and seatbelt pretensioners. Its extensive use of light-weight high-strength steel enabled it to withstand a concrete barrier offset crash at 35 mph (56 km/h) without serious passenger injury or cabin deformation.

Mercedes introduced a performance variant, marketed as the 190 E 2.3-16V, at the 1983 Frankfurt Motor Show.

== First generation (W202; 1993) ==
First generation
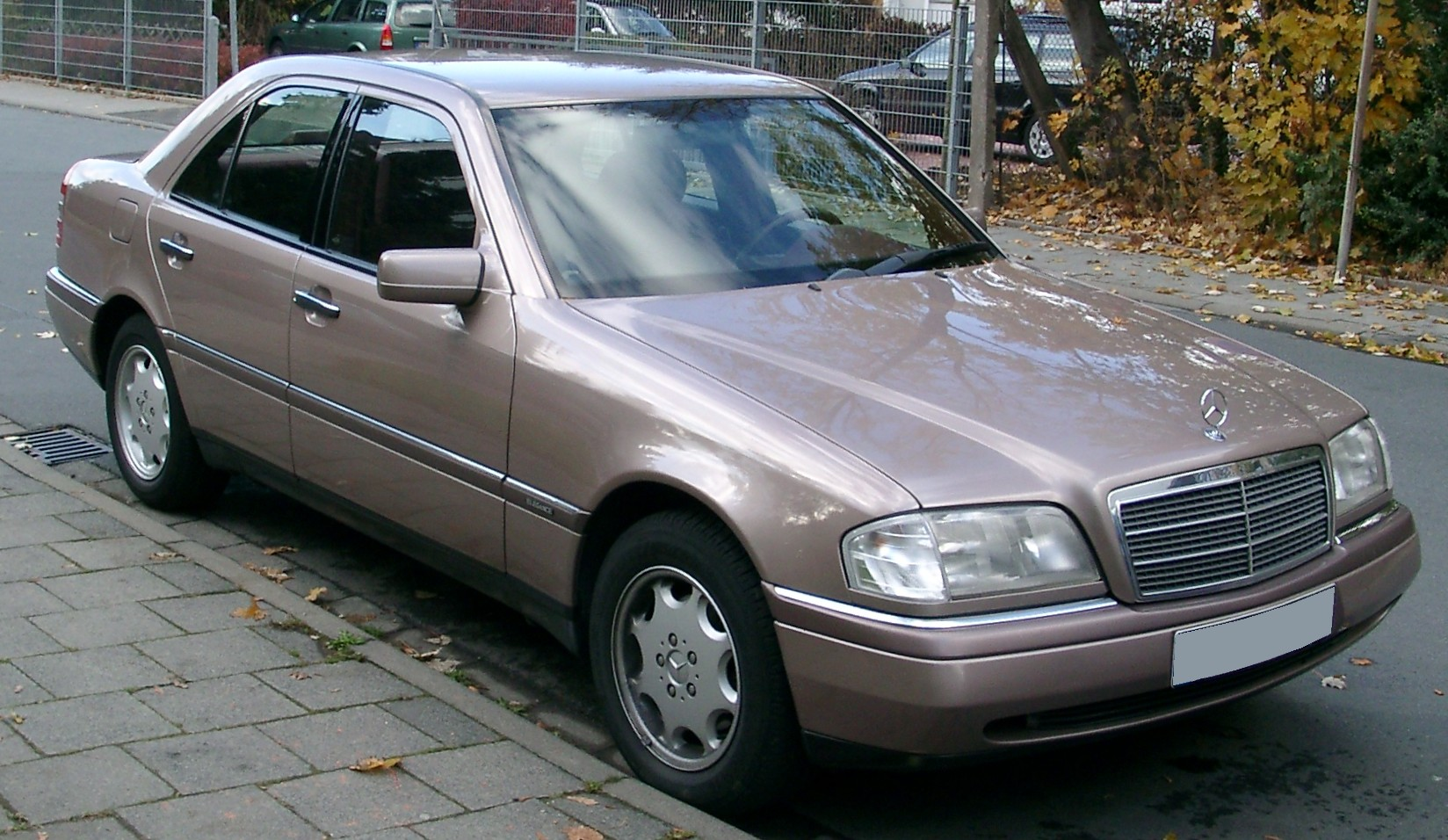

Overview
- Model code: W202; S202 (Wagon)
- Production: 1992–2001

Body and chassis
- Body style: 4-door sedan 5-door wagon

In May 1993, the first generation W202 C-Class was introduced as a replacement for the 190. The first C-Class (W202) sedan was manufactured in August 1992. The C-Class sedan was the company's entry-level model up until 1997 when Mercedes launched the A-Class. Styling themes were carried over from the previous W201 series, but the new series had a smoother and rounder design than the last generation of compact Mercedes, with styling cues from the W124 E-Class (short, high trunk and taller tail lights), W140 S-Class (front end), and R129 SL-Class (headlights).

== Second generation (W203; 2000) ==
Second generation
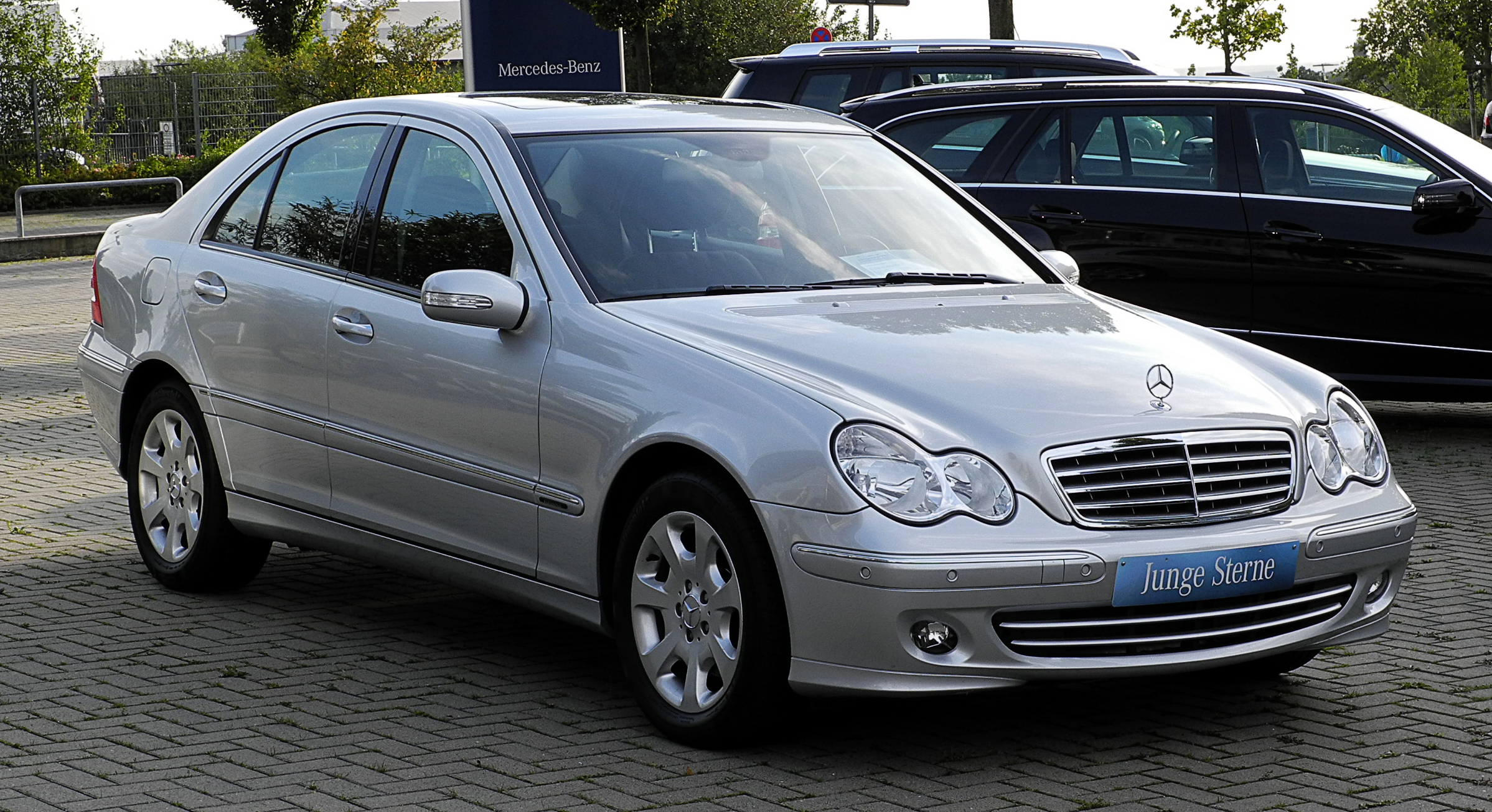

Overview
- Model code: W203; S203 (Wagon); CL203 (SportCoupé)
- Production: 1999–2010

Body and chassis
- Body style: 3-door liftback 4-door sedan 5-door station wagon

The second generation C-Class was introduced in March 2000 while production began in March 1999. The sedan debuted with a range of inline-four and V6 petrol engines and inline-four and -five diesels, later W203's received the V6 diesel. Most of the engines were carried over from the W202, but the C320 was exclusive, offering 160 kW (215 hp; 218 PS). The diesels now featured common rail direct fuel injection and variable geometry turbochargers. A six-speed manual gearbox was optional on some models in the range, with the exception of the C320 and C32 AMG. Notably (post 2005), for the first time, the number designations were no longer equivalent to the engine displacement, more specifically in the Mercedes C200 (1.8-litre), C240 (2.6-litre) and C200 CDI (2.2-litre).

== Third generation (W204; 2007) ==
Third generation
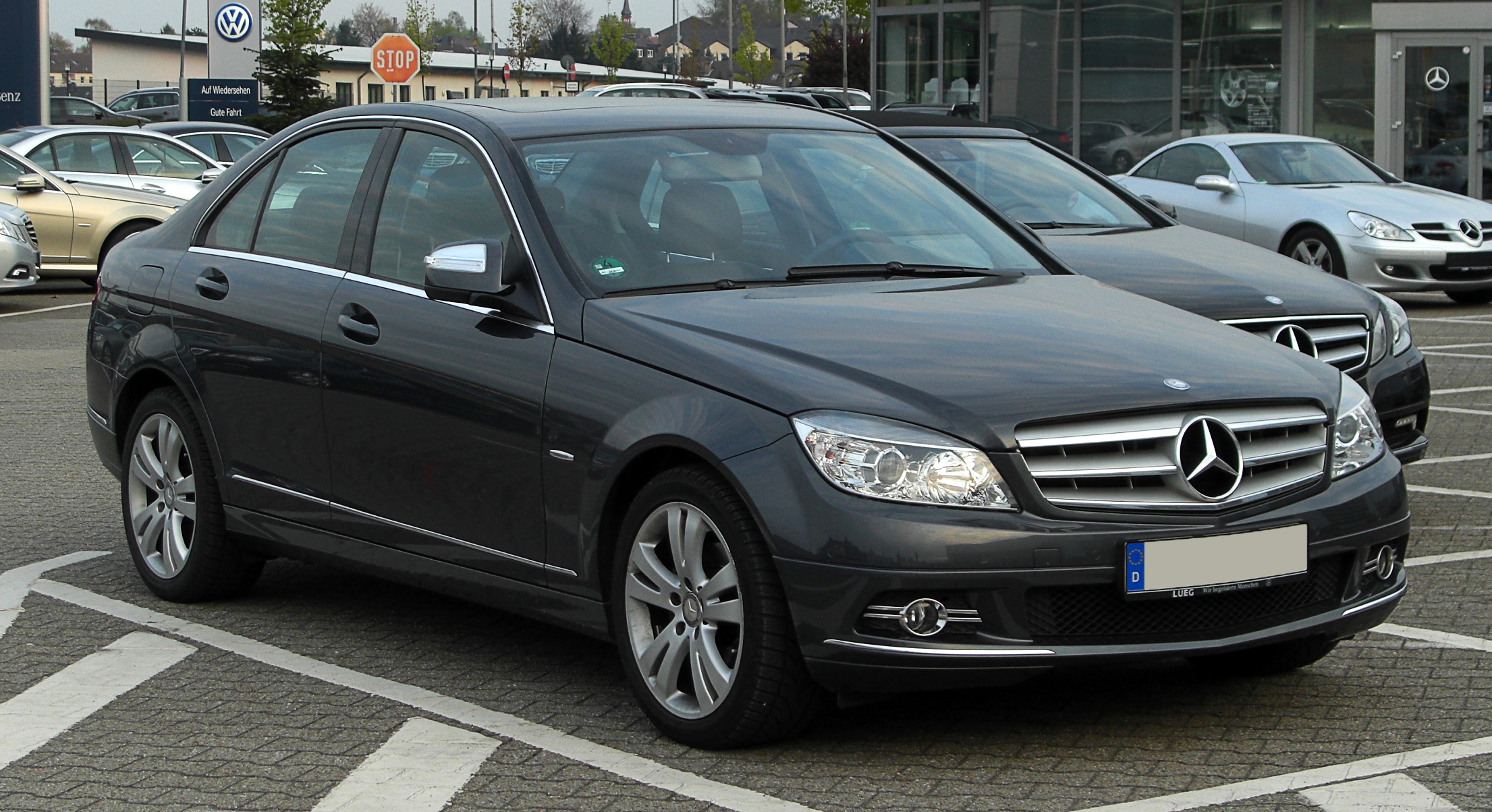

Overview
- Model code: W204; S204 (Wagon); C204 (Coupé)
- Production: 2006–2015

Body and chassis
- Body style: 3-door liftback 4-door sedan 5-door station wagon 2-door coupe

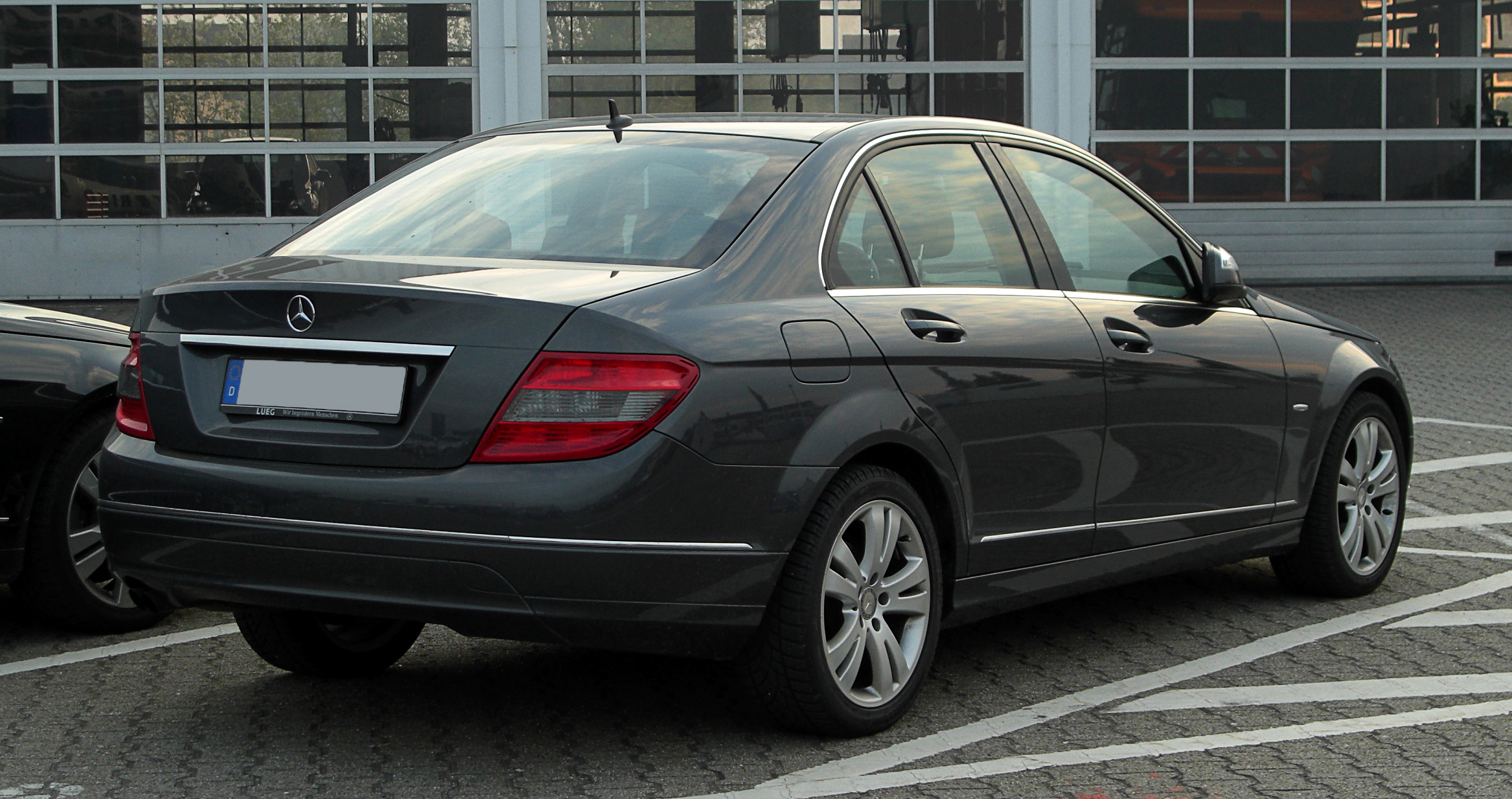
Pre-facelift Mercedes-Benz C180 Kompressor sedan

DaimlerChrysler introduced the W204 C-Class on 18 January 2007 and displayed it in the 2007 Geneva Auto Show. Sales started on 31 March 2007 in almost all European countries. The new family had an extended wheelbase and tracks, a stiffer body/shell and a design inspired by the W221 S-Class with some influences from the C219 CLS-Class. The C-Class received a facelift in 2011 for the 2012 model year including new LED taillights, a revised dashboard and instrument cluster layout, and a revised front fascia and headlights. The W204 platform continued into 2015 with the C-Class coupe. The final farewell of the W204, and also the naturally aspirated V8, was in the Edition 507 model. This had increased power, lightweight wheels and the vented hood from the Black Series.

== Fourth generation (W205; 2014) ==
Fourth generation
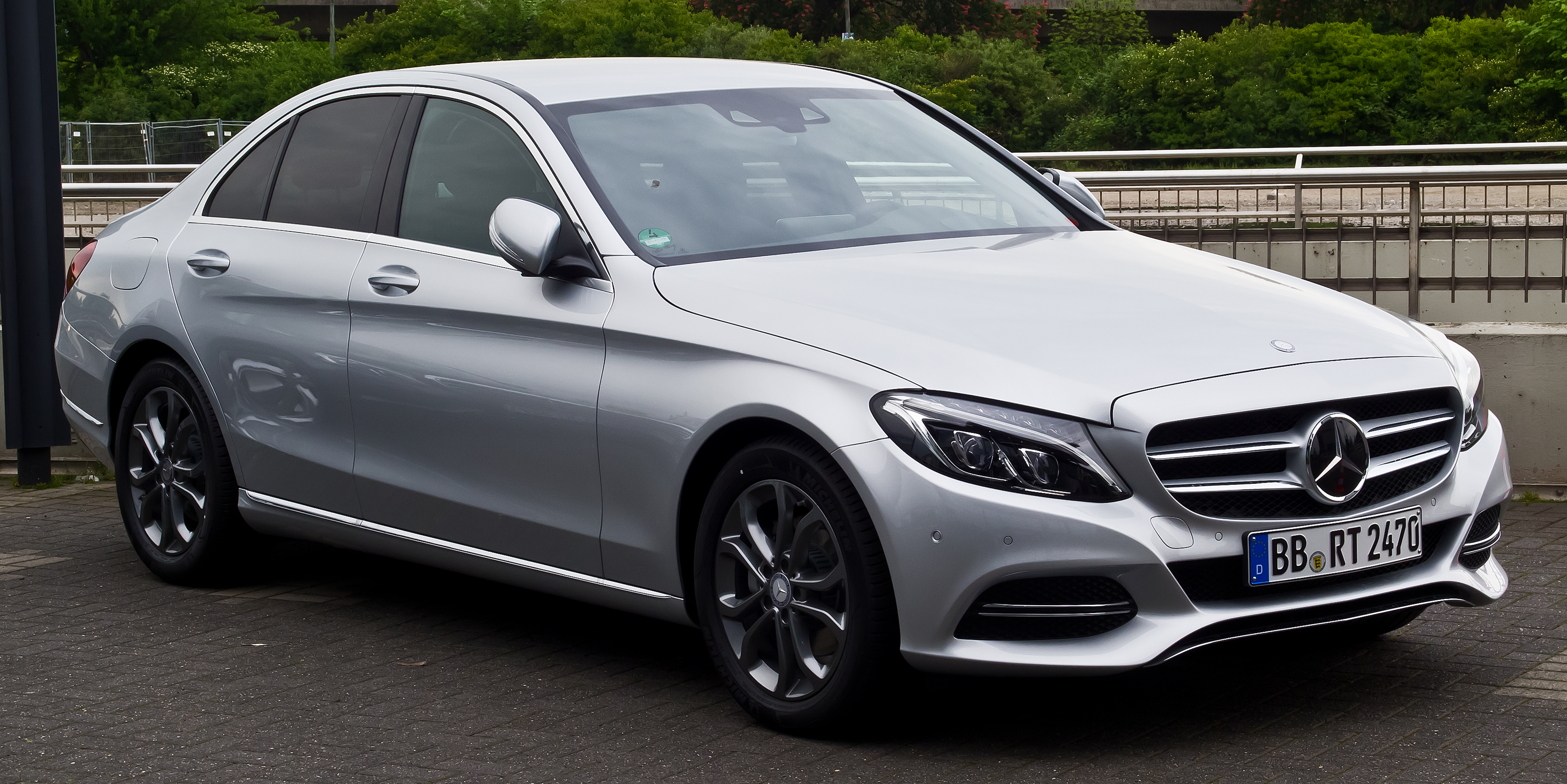

Overview
- Model code: W205; S205 (Wagon); C205 (Coupé); A205 (Cabriolet)
- Production: 2014–2021

Body and chassis
- Body style: 4-door sedan 5-door station wagon 2-door cabriolet 2-door coupe

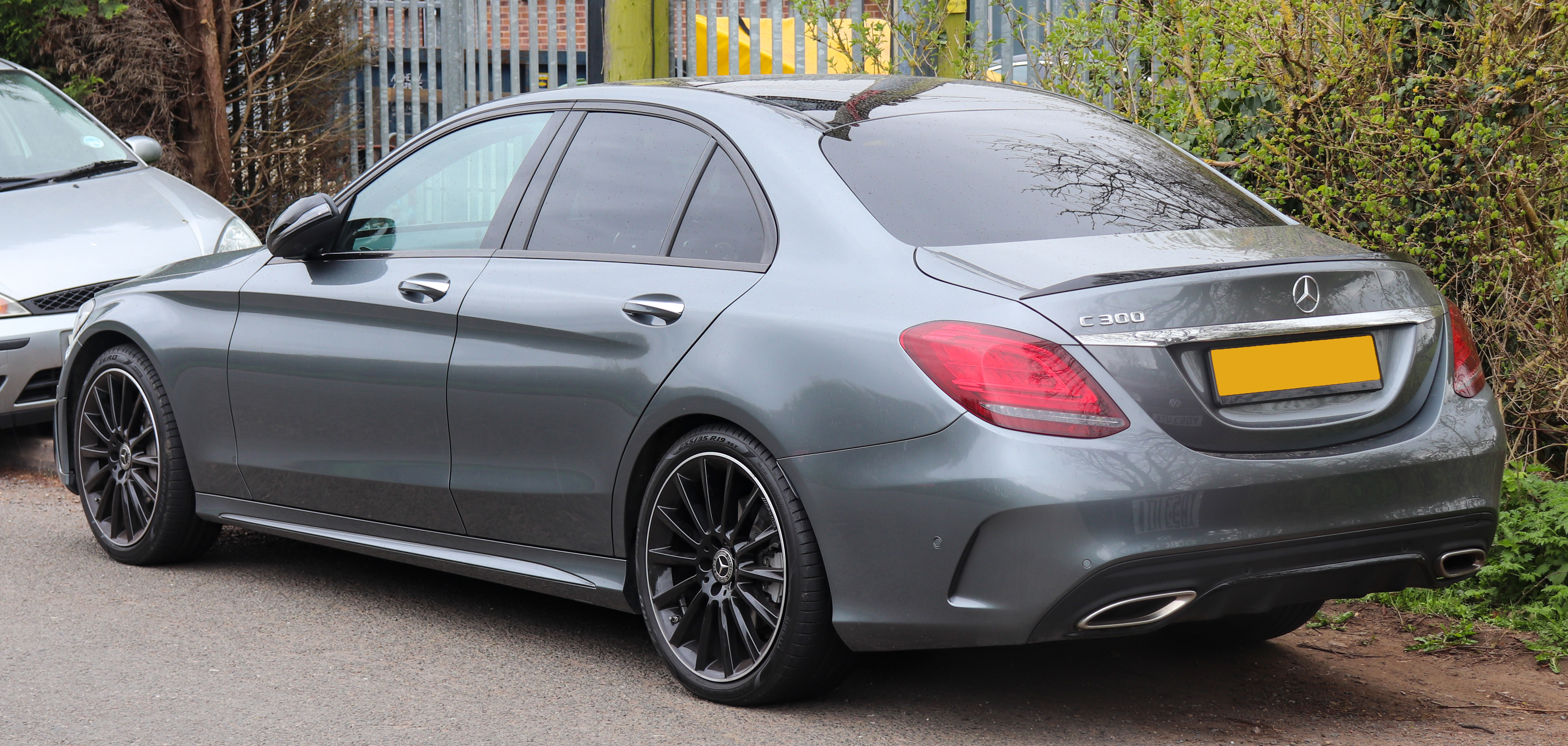
Mercedes-Benz C300 sedan

The W205 C-Class was launched at the 2014 North American International Auto Show. The new structure was significantly lighter using aluminium and high-strength steel extensively throughout the body, resulting in a 100-kilogram (220 lb) weight decrease. The Mercedes-Benz C-Class 205 chassis spawned four C-Class bodystyles; sedan (W205), wagon (S205), coupe (C205), and cabriolet (A205).

The car was officially unveiled on 16 December 2013. W205 production commenced on 4 February 2014 at the Bremen plant. Production was also undertaken at Mercedes-Benz plants in East London (South Africa), Iracemápolis (Brazil) and Tuscaloosa, Alabama (United States). European sales began in March 2014, while the vehicle went on sale in North America in September 2014.

A mid-life update made its debut at the 2018 Geneva Motor Show, including exterior changes and new engines.

== Fifth generation (W206; 2021) ==
Fifth generation
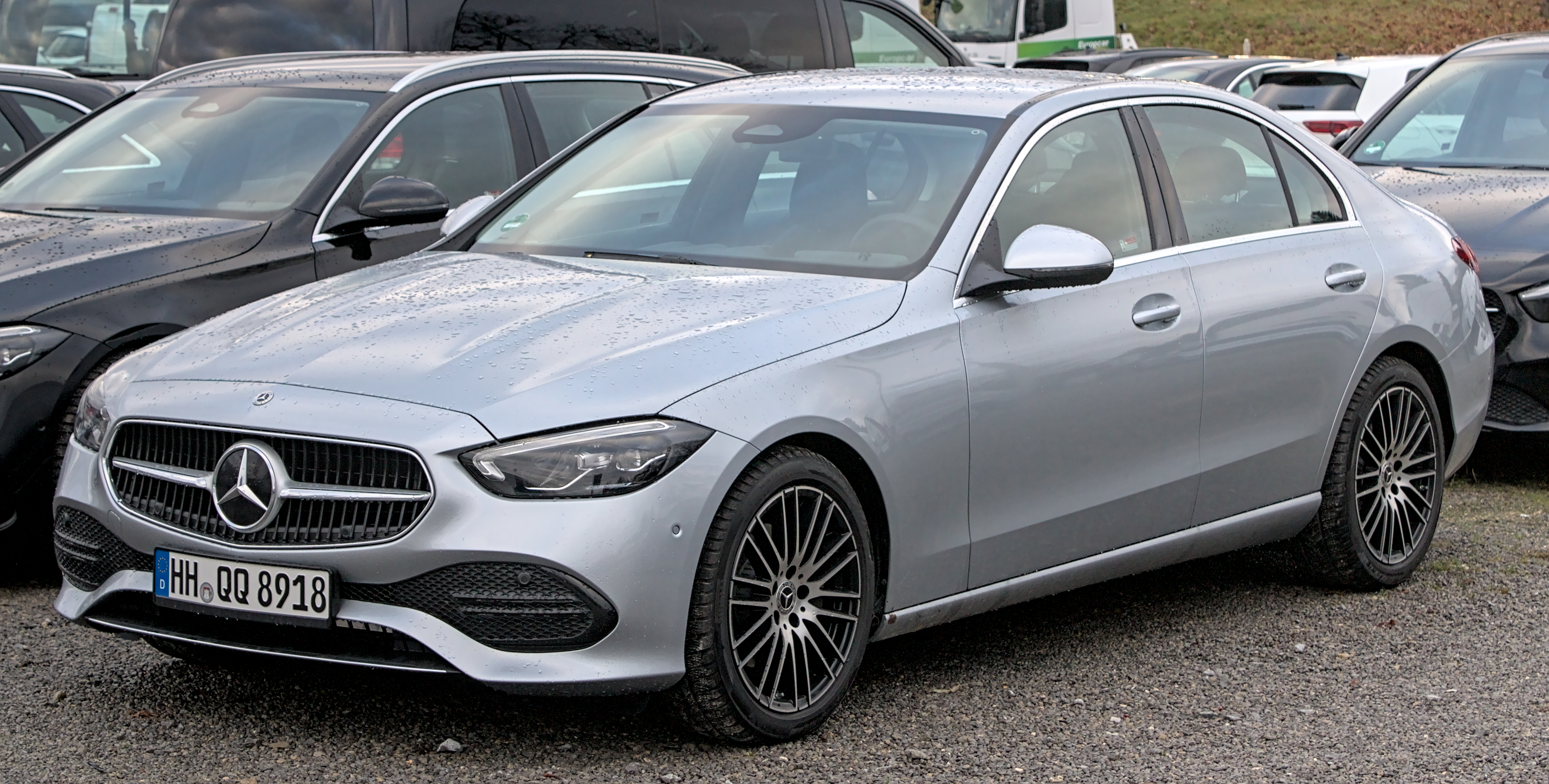

Overview
- Model code: W206; S206 (Wagon); V206 (long-wheelbase sedan)
- Production: 2021–present

Body and chassis
- Body style: 4-door sedan 5-door station wagon

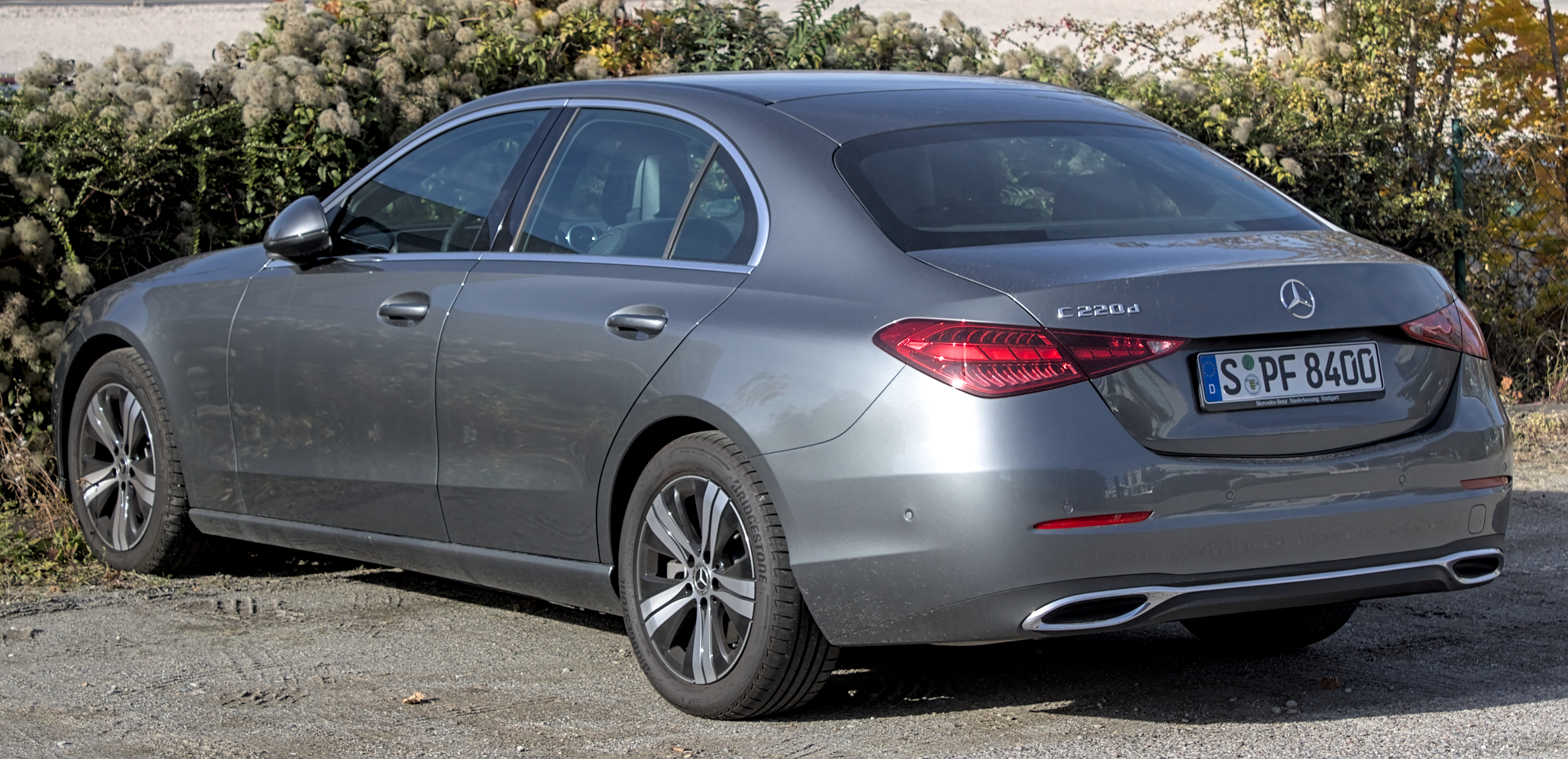
Mercedes-Benz C220d sedan

The W206 C-Class was unveiled on 23 February 2021. In China, the C-Class was launched in a long-wheelbase version (V206). For the first time, all W206 C-Class models are equipped with four-cylinder engines coupled with an integrated starter generator (15 kW electric motor) and a 48-volt electrical system.

The C-Class All-Terrain (X206) was released as an off-road focused, crossover-inspired estate model. The model received external body cladding, a 40 mm increase in ride height, 4Matic AWD and additional drive modes.

== Battery electric (W520; 2026) ==
Battery electric

Overview
- Model code: W520
- Production: 2026–present

Body and chassis
- Body style: 4-door sedan

Mercedes-Benz C400 sedan

The W520 C-Class was unveiled on 20 April 2026. It has an 800-volt system, a two-speed gearbox, a dash-spanning digital display, and 350 miles of range. Sales are set to begin in early 2027.

== Production and sales ==
Calendar year	Production (sedan/estate/coupe)	US sales	China sales			Malaysia (Note: Figures based on registration (Malaysia))
Calendar year	Production (sedan/estate/coupe)	US sales	ICE	PHEV	Total	Malaysia
2000						1,143
2001		51,210				2,325
2002		64,025				2,117
2003		65,982				1,257
2004		69,251				1,559
2005		60,658				1,721
2006		50,187				1,857
2007		63,701				1,826
2008		72,471				2,530
2009		52,427			16,000	2,554
2010	313,500 (250,600 / 62,900)	58,785			27,220	2,756
2011		69,314				3,038
2012	413,193 (-/-/48,145)	81,697				3,988
2013		88,251				3,752
2014	316,792	75,065				3,195
2015	443,909	86,080				3,839
2016	490,200	77,167				5,597
2017		77,447				4,856
2018		60,409				5,328
2019						5,286
2020						3,340
2021						1,613
2022						2,958
2023			150,153	5,115	155,268	3,903
2024			162,776	5,297	168,073	2,276
2025			123,130	3,340	126,470	1,565
