= World Car Awards =

Group of automobile awards

The World Car Awards (also known as World Car of the Year, WCOTY) is a group of automobile Car of the Year awards selected by a jury of 102 international automotive journalists from 30 countries. Cars considered must be sold in at least two major markets (North America, Europe, Asia, Latin America) on at least two separate continents prior to 30 March of the year of the award. The contest was inaugurated in 2003, and officially launched in January 2004.

The World Car Awards are administered by a not-for-profit association under the guidance of a Steering Committee.

This started as a single award, similar to many of the continent and nation specific Car of the Year awards already given. Since 2006, awards for performance, green cars, and car design have also been given. In April 2013, an award for luxury design was inaugurated.

== History ==
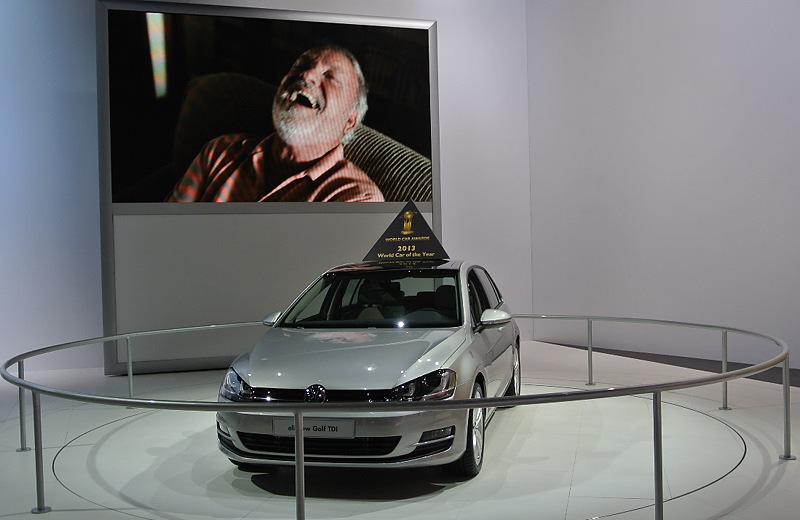
Volkswagen Golf VII is the 2013 World Car of the Year

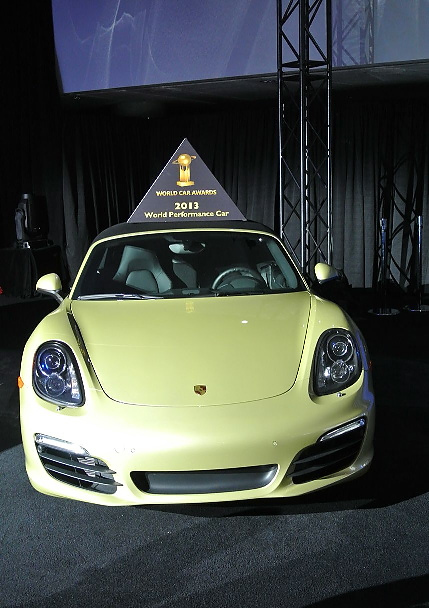
Porsche Boxster is the 2013 World Performance Car

2005
Ten finalists were reduced to three, before the winner was selected at the Canadian International AutoShow in Toronto. The Audi A6, Porsche 911, and Volvo S40/V50 were the top three finalists.

2006
For 2006, in addition to the WCOTY award, the performance, green, and design categories were added; the award was announced at the New York International Auto Show. The BMW 3 Series, Mazda MX-5, and Porsche Cayman were the top three finalists.

2007
The Lexus LS, MINI, and Audi TT were the top three finalists. The winner was announced at the New York International Auto Show.

2008
The Mazda2 / Demio, Ford Mondeo, and Mercedes-Benz C-Class were the top three finalists. The winner was announced at the New York International Auto Show.

2009
The Volkswagen Golf, and Toyota iQ were the top three finalists. The winner was announced at the New York International Auto Show.

2010
The Volkswagen Polo, Mercedes-Benz E-Class, and Audi A5 were the top three finalists. The winner was announced at the New York International Auto Show.

2011
The Nissan Leaf, Audi A8, and BMW 5 Series were the top three finalists. The winner was announced at the New York International Auto Show.

2012
The Volkswagen up!, BMW 3 Series, and Porsche 911 were the top three finalists. The winner was announced at the New York International Auto Show.

2013
The Volkswagen Golf, Mercedes-Benz A-Class, Porsche Boxster and Subaru BRZ/Toyota GT-86 were the top four finalists. The winner was announced at the New York International Auto Show.

2014
The Audi A3, Mazda3 and BMW 4 Series were the top three finalists. The winner was announced at the New York International Auto Show.

2015
The Mercedes-Benz C-Class, Volkswagen Passat and Ford Mustang were the top three finalists. The winner was announced at the New York International Auto Show.

2016
The Mazda MX-5, Mercedes-Benz GLC and Audi A4 were the top three finalists. The winner was announced at the New York International Auto Show.

2017
The Jaguar F-Pace, Volkswagen Tiguan and Audi Q5 were the top three finalists. The winner was announced at the New York International Auto Show.

2018
The Volvo XC60, Range Rover Velar and Mazda CX-5 were the top three finalists. The winner was announced at the New York International Auto Show.

2019
The Audi e-tron, Jaguar I-Pace and Volvo S60/V60 are the top three finalists. The winner was announced at the New York International Auto Show.

2026
The BMW iX3, Hyundai Palisade and Nissan Leaf are the top three finalists. The winner was announced at the New York International Auto Show.

== Results ==
=== Winners ===
Vehicles in the World Performance Car, World Urban Car, World Electric Vehicle and World Car Design of the Year categories may also be contenders in the overall “World Car of the Year” class, depending on type and pricing.

Year	World Car of the Year	World Performance Car	World Green Car (2007 - 2019) World Electric Vehicle (2020 - )	World Car Design of the Year	World Luxury Car	World Urban Car
2005	Audi A6					
2006	BMW 3 Series	Porsche Cayman S	Honda Civic Hybrid	Citroën C4		
2007	Lexus LS 460	Audi RS4	Mercedes-Benz E320 Bluetec	Audi TT		
2008	Mazda2 / Demio	Audi R8	BMW 118d with Efficient Dynamics	Audi R8		
2009	Volkswagen Golf Mk6	Nissan GT-R	Honda FCX Clarity	Fiat Nuova 500		
2010	Volkswagen Polo	Audi R8 V10	Volkswagen BlueMotion	Chevrolet Camaro		
2011	Nissan Leaf	Ferrari 458 Italia	Chevrolet Volt	Aston Martin Rapide		
2012	Volkswagen up!	Porsche 991	Mercedes-Benz S250 BlueEfficiency	Range Rover Evoque		
2013	Volkswagen Golf Mk7	Porsche Boxster / Cayman	Tesla Model S	Jaguar F-Type		
2014	Audi A3	Porsche 911 GT3	BMW i3	BMW i3	Mercedes-Benz S-Class (W222)	
2015	Mercedes-Benz C-Class (W205)	Mercedes-AMG GT	BMW i8	Citroën C4 Cactus	Mercedes-Benz S-Class (C217)	
2016	Mazda MX-5	Audi R8 Coupe	Toyota Mirai	Mazda MX-5	BMW 7 Series	
2017	Jaguar F-Pace	Porsche Boxster Cayman	Toyota Prius Prime	Jaguar F-Pace	Mercedes-Benz E-Class	BMW i3
2018	Volvo XC40	BMW M5	Nissan LEAF	Range Rover Velar	Audi A8	Volkswagen Polo
2019	Jaguar I-Pace	McLaren 720S	Jaguar I-Pace	Jaguar I-Pace	Audi A7	Suzuki Jimny
2020	Kia Telluride	Porsche Taycan		Mazda3	Porsche Taycan	Kia Soul EV
2021	Volkswagen ID.4	Porsche 911 Turbo		Land Rover Defender	Mercedes-Benz S-Class	Honda e
2022	Hyundai Ioniq 5	Audi e-tron GT	Hyundai Ioniq 5	Hyundai Ioniq 5	Mercedes-Benz EQS	Toyota Yaris Cross
2023	Hyundai Ioniq 6	Kia EV6 GT	Hyundai Ioniq 6	Hyundai Ioniq 6	Lucid Air	Citroën C3 (CC21)
2024	Kia EV9	Hyundai Ioniq 5 N	Kia EV9	Toyota Prius	BMW 5 Series/i5	Volvo EX30
2025	Kia EV3	Porsche 911 Carrera GTS	Hyundai Casper Electric/Inster	VW ID. Buzz	Volvo EX90	BYD Seagull/Dolphin Mini
2026	BMW iX3	Hyundai Ioniq 6 N	BMW iX3	Mazda 6e	Lucid Gravity	Nio Firefly

=== Finalists and top 3 ===
Year	World Car of the Year	World Performance Car	World Green Car (2007 - 2019) World Electric Vehicle (2020 - )	World Car Design of the Year	World Luxury Car	World Urban Car
2005	Audi A6 (winner); Porsche 911; Volvo S40 & Volvo V50; BMW 1 Series; Chevrolet Corvette; Chrysler 300 & Chrysler 300C; Ford Focus; Land Rover LR3; Mercedes-Benz A-Class; Mercedes-Benz SLK					
2006	BMW 3 Series (winner); Mazda MX-5; Porsche Cayman S; BMW 1 Series; Honda Civic & Honda Civic Hybrid; Range Rover Sport; Lexus IS; Mercedes-Benz M-Class; Mercedes-Benz S-Class; Suzuki Swift; Volkswagen Passat	Porsche Cayman S (winner); Audi RS4; BMW M5; Aston Martin V8 Vantage; BMW 130i MSport; BMW M6; Bugatti Veyron 16.4; Chrysler 300C SRT-8	Honda Civic Hybrid (winner); Citroën C1 1.4 Hdi Diesel; Lexus RX 400h; BMW 325Ci	Citroën C4 (winner); BMW 3 Series; Honda Civic; Aston Martin V8 Vantage; BMW 1 Series		
2007	Lexus LS 460 (winner); MINI; Audi TT; Audi Q7; BMW Z4 (E85); Citroën C4 Picasso; Citroën C6; Fiat Grande Punto; Fiat Sedici/Suzuki SX4; Jaguar XK; Mercedes CL	Audi RS4 (winner); BMW 335i; Porsche 911 Turbo; Audi S6; BMW Z4/Z4 M; Ferrari 599 GTB Fiorano; Jaguar XKR; Mazda 3 MPS/Mazdaspeed3; Porsche 911 GT3; Renault Clio Renault Sport	Mercedes-Benz E320 Bluetec (winner); BMW Hydrogen 7 Series; Volkswagen Polo GTI BlueMotion	Audi TT (winner); Citroën C4 Picasso; Fiat Grande Punto		
2008	Mazda2/Demio (winner); Ford Mondeo; Mercedes-Benz C-Class; Audi A5/S5; Audi R8; Cadillac CTS; Ford S-Max; Nissan Qashqai/Dualis; Nissan Skyline Coupe/Infiniti G37 Coupe; Volvo C30	Audi R8 (winner); Audi S5 Coupé; BMW M3; Mercedes-Benz CL 63 AMG; Mercedes-Benz S 63 AMG; Aston Martin V8 Vantage Roadster; Honda Civic Type R; Maserati GranTurismo; Mercedes-Benz CLK63 AMG Black Series; Renault Clio F1 Team R27	BMW 118d (winner); Smart Fortwo cdi; Volkswagen Passat 1.9 TDI; Chevrolet Equinox Fuel Cell Electric Vehicle; Chevrolet Malibu Hybrid; Chevrolet Tahoe/GMC Yukon Hybrids; Lexus LS 600h L; Nissan Altima Hybrid; Saturn Aura Green Line; Saturn Vue Green Line	Audi R8 (winner); Mazda2; Volvo C30; Audi R8 Coupe / Spyder		
2009	Volkswagen Golf (winner); Ford Fiesta; Toyota iQ; Audi A4; BMW 7 Series; Citroën C5; Fiat 500; Honda Fit/Jazz; Jaguar XF; Mazda6/Atenza; Nissan GT-R	Nissan GT-R (winner); Chevrolet Corvette ZR1; Porsche 911; Audi RS6 Avant; BMW 135i; Lamborghini LP560-4 Gallardo; Mercedes-Benz C63 AMG; Mercedes-Benz SL 63 AMG; Mitsubishi Evo X / Evo MR; Subaru Impreza WRX STI	Honda FCX Clarity (winner); Toyota iQ; Mitsubishi i MiEV	Fiat 500 (winner); Jaguar XF; Citroën C5		
2010	Volkswagen Polo (winner); Mercedes-Benz E-Class; Toyota Prius; Chevrolet Cruze; Kia Soul; Mazda3	Audi R8 V10 (winner); Ferrari California; Porsche 911 GT3; Aston Martin V12 Vantage; Audi TT RS Coupé/Roadster; BMW Z4 (E89); Jaguar XFR; Mercedes-Benz E63 AMG; Nissan 370Z	Volkswagen BlueMotion (winner); Honda Insight; Toyota Prius; Ford Fusion Hybrid; Mercedes-Benz S400 BlueHybrid	Chevrolet Camaro (winner); Citroën C3 Picasso; Kia Soul; Toyota Prius		
2011	Nissan Leaf (winner); Audi A8; BMW 5 Series; Audi A1; BMW X3; Jaguar XJ; Jeep Grand Cherokee; Mercedes-Benz SLS; Porsche Cayenne; Volvo S60 / V60	Ferrari 458 Italia (winner); Mercedes-Benz SLS AMG; Porsche 911 Turbo; Aston Martin Rapide; Audi RS5; Cadillac CTS-V; Lamborghini Gallardo SUPERLEGGERA; Mercedes-Benz CL63 AMG; Porsche 911 GT2RS; Renault Mégane III / Renault Sport	Chevrolet Volt (winner); BMW 320d EfficientDynamics Edition; Nissan Leaf; Hyundai Sonata Hybrid; Mercedes-Benz B-Class F-Cell; smart electric drive	Aston Martin Rapide (winner); Alfa Romeo Giulietta; Ferrari 458 Italia; Audi A7; Citroën DS3; Honda CR-Z; Kia Sportage; Nissan Juke		
2012	Volkswagen up! (winner); BMW 3 Series; Porsche 911; Audi A6; Audi Q3; BMW 1 Series; Chevrolet Volt/Opel/Vauxhall Ampera; Citroën DS5; Ford Focus; Range Rover Evoque	Porsche 911 (winner); Lamborghini Aventador; McLaren MP4-12C; Audi RS 3 Sportback; BMW 1 Series M Coupé; BMW M5; Chevrolet Camaro ZL1; Ferrari FF; Mercedes-Benz C-63 Coupe AMG Black Series; Mercedes-Benz CLS 63 AMG	Mercedes-Benz S250 CDI BlueEFFICIENCY (winner); Ford Focus Electric; Peugeot 3008 HYbrid4; Mitsubishi i; Renault Fluence ZE	Range Rover Evoque (winner); Volkswagen up!; Citroën DS5; Hyundai Veloster; Porsche 911		
2013	Volkswagen Golf (winner); Mercedes-Benz A-Class; Porsche Boxster/Cayman; Scion FR-S/Subaru BRZ/Toyota GT-86; Audi A3; Land Rover Range Rover; Mazda CX-5; Mazda6; Peugeot 208; Volvo V40	Porsche Boxster/Cayman (winner); Scion FR-S/Subaru BRZ/Toyota GT-86; Ferrari F12 Berlinetta; Aston Martin Vanquish; Audi RS5; BMW M6; BMW M135i; Mercedes SL63 AMG; Mercedes SLS AMG Roadster; Renaultsport Clio 200 EDC	Tesla Model S (winner); Renault Zoe; Volvo V60 Plug-in Hybrid; Smart Electric Drive; Volkswagen Jetta Hybrid	Jaguar F-Type (winner); Aston Martin Vanquish; Mazda6; Range Rover; Renault Clio; Volkswagen Golf		
2014	Audi A3 (winner); Mazda3; BMW 4 Series; BMW i3; Cadillac CTS; Citroën C4 Picasso; Ford Fusion / Mondeo; Infiniti Q50; Jeep Cherokee; Lexus IS; Peugeot 308; Škoda Octavia	Porsche 911 GT3 (winner); Chevrolet Corvette Stingray; Ferrari 458 Speciale; Alfa Romeo 4C; Audi RS6 Avant; BMW M6 Gran Coupé; Ford Fiesta ST; Lamborghini Aventador LP700-4 Roadster; Mercedes-Benz A/CLA45 AMG; Porsche 911 Turbo; Volkswagen Golf GTI	BMW i3 (winner); Audi A3 Sportback e-tron; Volkswagen XL1; Honda Accord Hybrid; Mitsubishi Outlander PHEV; Volkswagen XL1	BMW i3 (winner); Mazda3; Mercedes-Benz C Class; Cadillac CTS; Citroën C4 Picasso; Lexus IS; Volkswagen XL1	Mercedes-Benz S-Class (winner); Bentley Flying Spur; Range Rover Sport; BMW X5; Cadillac ELR; Cadillac Escalade; Maserati Ghibli; Maserati Quattroporte; Porsche Macan; Rolls-Royce Wraith	
2015	Mercedes-Benz C Class (winner); Volkswagen Passat; Ford Mustang; Hyundai Genesis; BMW 2 Series Active Tourer; Nissan Qashqai; Jeep Renegade; Mazda2; Mini Hardtop	Mercedes-AMG GT (winner); Jaguar F-Type R Coupé; BMW M4; Audi S1; Audi S3; Audi TT; Bentley Continental GT Speed; BMW M3; Chevrolet Corvette Z06; Dodge Challenger SRT Hellcat; Lexus RC F	BMW i8 (winner); Kia Soul EV; Volkswagen Golf GTE; Hyundai Tucson Fuel Cell; Volvo XC90 T8	Citroën C4 Cactus (winner); Volvo XC90; Mercedes-Benz C Class; BMW 2 Series Active Tourer; Porsche Macan	Mercedes-Benz S-Class Coupé (winner); BMW i8; Range Rover Autobiography Black LWB; BMW X6; Cadillac ATS Coupé; Cadillac Escalade / ESV; Kia K900; Lexus NX; Lexus RC; Lincoln MKC	
2016	Mazda MX-5 (winner); Mercedes-Benz GLC; Audi A4 Sedan / Audi A4 Avant; Skoda Superb; Jaguar XE; Land Rover Discovery Sport; Toyota Prius; BMW X1; Mazda CX-3; Hyundai Tucson	Audi R8 Coupe (winner); Mercedes-AMG C 63 Coupé; Honda Civic Type R I; Chevrolet Camaro; Range Rover Sport SVR	Toyota Mirai (Hydrogen Fuel Cell) (winner); Toyota Prius (Hybrid); Chevrolet Volt; BMW 330e Plug-in-hybrid; Volkswagen Passat GTE	Mazda MX-5 (winner); Jaguar XE; Mazda CX-3; Cadillac CT6; Land Rover Discovery Sport	BMW 7 Series (winner); Volvo XC90; Audi Q7; Jaguar XF; Mercedes-Benz GLE Coupe	
2017	Jaguar F-Pace (winner); Volkswagen Tiguan; Audi Q5; Honda Civic; Audi Q2; Audi A5 / S5; Mazda CX-9; Toyota C-HR; Fiat 124 Spider / Abarth 124 Spider	Porsche Boxster Cayman (winner); Audi R8 Spyder; McLaren 570S; Honda / Acura NSX; Aston Martin DB11	Toyota Prius Prime (winner); Chevrolet Bolt; Honda Clarity Fuel-Cell Car; Hyundai Ioniq; Tesla Model X	Jaguar F-Pace (winner); Mercedes-Benz S-Class Cabriolet; Toyota C-HR; Mazda CX-9; Audi A5 / S5	Mercedes-Benz E-Class (winner); Volvo S90/V90; BMW 5 Series; Bentley Bentayga; Genesis G90	BMW i3 (94 Ah) (winner); Citroën C3; Suzuki Ignis; Smart Cabriolet (A453) (2016–present); Ford KA+
2018	Volvo XC60 (winner); Range Rover Velar; Mazda CX-5; Kia Stinger; BMW X3; Toyota Camry; Land Rover Discovery; Alfa Romeo Giulia; Nissan LEAF	BMW M5 (winner); Lexus LC 500; Honda Civic Type R; Alfa Romeo Giulia; Audi RS3 Sedan	Nissan LEAF (winner); BMW 530e iPerformance; Chrysler Pacifica Hybrid; Chevrolet Cruze Diesel	Range Rover Velar (winner); Lexus LC 500; Volvo XC60; Renault Alpine A110; Citroën C3 Aircross / B-SUV C3 Aircross	Audi A8 (winner); Porsche Cayenne; Porsche Panamera; Lexus LS; BMW 6 Series Gran Turismo	Volkswagen Polo (winner); Ford Fiesta; Suzuki Swift; Hyundai Kona; Nissan Micra
2019	Jaguar I-Pace (winner); Audi e-tron; Volvo S60/V60; BMW 3 Series; Ford Focus; Genesis G70; Hyundai Nexo; Mercedes-Benz A-Class; Suzuki Jimny; Volvo XC40	McLaren 720S (winner); Aston Martin Vantage; Mercedes-AMG GT 4-Door Coupé; BMW M2 Competition; Hyundai Veloster N	Jaguar I-Pace (winner); Audi e-tron; Hyundai Nexo; Honda Clarity Plug-In Hybrid; Kia Niro EV	Jaguar I-Pace (winner); Suzuki Jimny; Volvo XC40; Citroën C5 Aircross; Jaguar E-Pace	Audi A7 (winner); Audi Q8; BMW 8 Series; Mercedes-Benz CLS; Volkswagen Touareg	Suzuki Jimny (winner); Hyundai AH2 / Santro; Kia Soul; Audi A1; SEAT Arona
2020	Kia Telluride; Mazda CX-30; Mazda3; Hyundai Sonata; Kia Soul EV; Land Rover Range Rover Evoque; Mercedes-Benz CLA; Mercedes-Benz GLB; Volkswagen Golf; Volkswagen T-Cross	Porsche Taycan; Porsche 911; Porsche 718 Spyder/Cayman GT4		Mazda3; Porsche Taycan; Peugeot 208	Porsche Taycan; Porsche 911; Mercedes-Benz EQC	Kia Soul EV; Mini Electric; Volkswagen T-Cross
2021	Volkswagen ID.4; Honda e; Toyota Yaris; Audi A3; BMW 2 Series Gran Coupé; BMW 4 Series Gran Coupé; Kia K5; Kia Sorento; Mazda MX-30; Mercedes-Benz GLA	Porsche 911 Turbo; Audi RS Q8; Toyota GR Yaris		Land Rover Defender; Honda e; Mazda MX-30	Mercedes-Benz S-Class; Land Rover Defender; Polestar 2	Honda e; Honda Jazz/Fit; Toyota Yaris
2022	Hyundai Ioniq 5; Kia EV6; Ford Mustang Mach-E; Audi Q4 e-tron; Cupra Formentor; Genesis G70; Honda Civic; Hyundai Tucson; Lexus NX; Toyota GR86 / Subaru BRZ	Audi e-tron GT; BMW M3; BMW M4; Toyota GR86 / Subaru BRZ	Hyundai Ioniq 5; Audi e-tron GT; Mercedes-Benz EQS	Hyundai Ioniq 5; Audi e-tron GT; Kia EV6	Mercedes-Benz EQS; BMW iX; Genesis GV70	Toyota Yaris Cross; Opel Mokka; Volkswagen Taigun
2023	Hyundai Ioniq 6; BMW X1/iX1; Kia Niro; Alfa Romeo Tonale; BMW 2 Series Coupé; Honda HR-V; Mazda CX-60; Mercedes-Benz C-Class; Nissan Ariya; Nissan Z	Kia EV6 GT; Nissan Z; Toyota GR Corolla	Hyundai Ioniq 6; BMW i7; Lucid Air	Hyundai Ioniq 6; Range Rover; Lucid Air	Lucid Air; Genesis G90; BMW 7 Series/i7	Citroën C3 (CC21); Ora Good Cat; Volkswagen Taigo
2024	Kia EV9 (winner); BYD Seal/Atto 4; Volvo EX30; Ford Bronco; Hyundai Kona/Kona Electric; Hyundai Santa Fe; Mazda CX-90; Subaru Crosstrek; Toyota Prius; Volkswagen ID.7	Hyundai Ioniq 5 N (winner); BMW M2; BMW XM; Ferrari Purosangue; Porsche Cayenne Turbo E-Hybrid	Kia EV9 (winner); BMW i5; Volvo EX30; Mercedes-Benz EQE SUV; Volkswagen ID.7	Toyota Prius (winner); Ford Bronco; Ferrari Purosangue; Volvo EX30; Zeekr X	BMW 5 Series/i5 (winner); Mercedes-Benz E-Class; Mercedes-Benz EQE SUV; Lexus LM; Mercedes-Benz CLE	Volvo EX30 (winner); BYD Dolphin; Lexus LBX; Abarth 500e; Suzuki Fronx
2025	Kia EV3 (winner); BMW X3; Hyundai Casper Electric/Inster; Audi A5/S5; Ford Mustang; Mini Cooper Electric; Suzuki Swift; Toyota Camry; Toyota Land Cruiser/Land Cruiser 250; Volkswagen Tiguan/Tayron	Porsche 911 Carrera GTS (winner); BMW M5; Porsche Taycan Turbo GT; Bentley Continental GT Speed; Ford Mustang	Hyundai Casper Electric/Inster (winner); Kia EV3; Porsche Macan Electric; Volkswagen ID. Buzz; Volvo EX90	Volkswagen ID. Buzz (winner); Kia EV3; Toyota Land Cruiser/Land Cruiser 250; Baojun Yunduo/Cloud/MG Windsor EV; Mini Cooper	Volvo EX90 (winner); Porsche Macan; Porsche Panamera; Lexus GX; Volkswagen ID. Buzz	BYD Seagull/Dolphin Mini (winner); Hyundai Casper Electric/Inster; Mini Cooper Electric; Mini Cooper; Suzuki Swift
2026	BMW iX3 (winner); Nissan Leaf; Hyundai Palisade; Audi Q5/SQ5; BYD Seal 06 DM-i; Hyundai Ioniq 9; Kia EV4; Kia EV5; Mercedes-Benz CLA; Toyota RAV4	Hyundai Ioniq 6 N (winner); BMW M2 CS; Chevrolet Corvette E-Ray; Land Rover Defender OCTA; Mercedes-AMG GT63 Pro	BMW iX3 (winner); Nissan Leaf; Mercedes-Benz CLA; Audi A6 e-tron; Hyundai Ioniq 9	Mazda 6e (winner); Volvo ES90; Kia PV5; Nio Firefly; Volvo ES90	Lucid Gravity (winner); Volvo ES90; Cadillac Vistiq; Audi A6/S6; Audi A6/S6 e-tron	Nio Firefly(winner); Hyundai Venue; Baojun Yep Plus / Chevrolet Spark EUV; Wuling Binguo; Alfa Romeo Junior

== Total wins by makers ==
Marque	Total wins	World Car of the Year	World Performance Car	World Green Car / World EV	World Car Design of the Year	World Luxury Car	World Urban Car
Audi	11	2 (2005, 2014)	5 (2007, 2008, 2010, 2016, 2022)		2 (2007, 2008)	2 (2018, 2019)	
BMW	11	2 (2006, 2026)	1 (2018)	4 (2008, 2014, 2015, 2026)	1 (2014)	2 (2016, 2024)	1 (2017)
Mercedes-Benz	9	1 (2015)	1 (2015)	2 (2007, 2012)		5 (2014, 2015, 2017, 2021, 2022)	
Porsche	9		8 (2006, 2012, 2013, 2014, 2017, 2020, 2021, 2025)			1 (2020)	
Hyundai	9	2 (2022, 2023)	2 (2024, 2026)	3 (2022, 2023, 2025)	2 (2022, 2023)		
Volkswagen	8	5 (2009, 2010, 2012, 2013, 2021)		1 (2010)	1 (2025)		1 (2018)
Jaguar	6	2 (2017, 2019)		1 (2019)	3 (2013, 2017, 2019)		
Kia	6	3 (2020, 2024, 2025)	1 (2023)	1 (2024)			1 (2020)
Toyota/Lexus	5	1 (2007)		2 (2016, 2017)	1 (2024)		1 (2022)
Mazda	5	2 (2008, 2016)			3 (2016, 2020, 2026)		
Nissan	3	1 (2011)	1 (2009)	1 (2018)			
Land Rover	3				3 (2012, 2018, 2021)		
Honda	3			2 (2006, 2009)			1 (2021)
Citroën	3				2 (2006, 2015)		1 (2023)
Volvo	3	1 (2018)				1 (2025)	1 (2024)
Lucid	2					2 (2023, 2026)	
Chevrolet	2			1 (2011)	1 (2010)		
Ferrari	1		1 (2011)				
Fiat	1				1 (2009)		
Tesla	1			1 (2013)			
Aston Martin	1				1 (2011)		
McLaren	1		1 (2019)				
Suzuki	1						1 (2019)
Nio	1						1 (2026)
BYD	1						1 (2025)

== See also ==
- List of motor vehicle awards
