= Volvo EX30 =

Battery electric subcompact crossover SUV

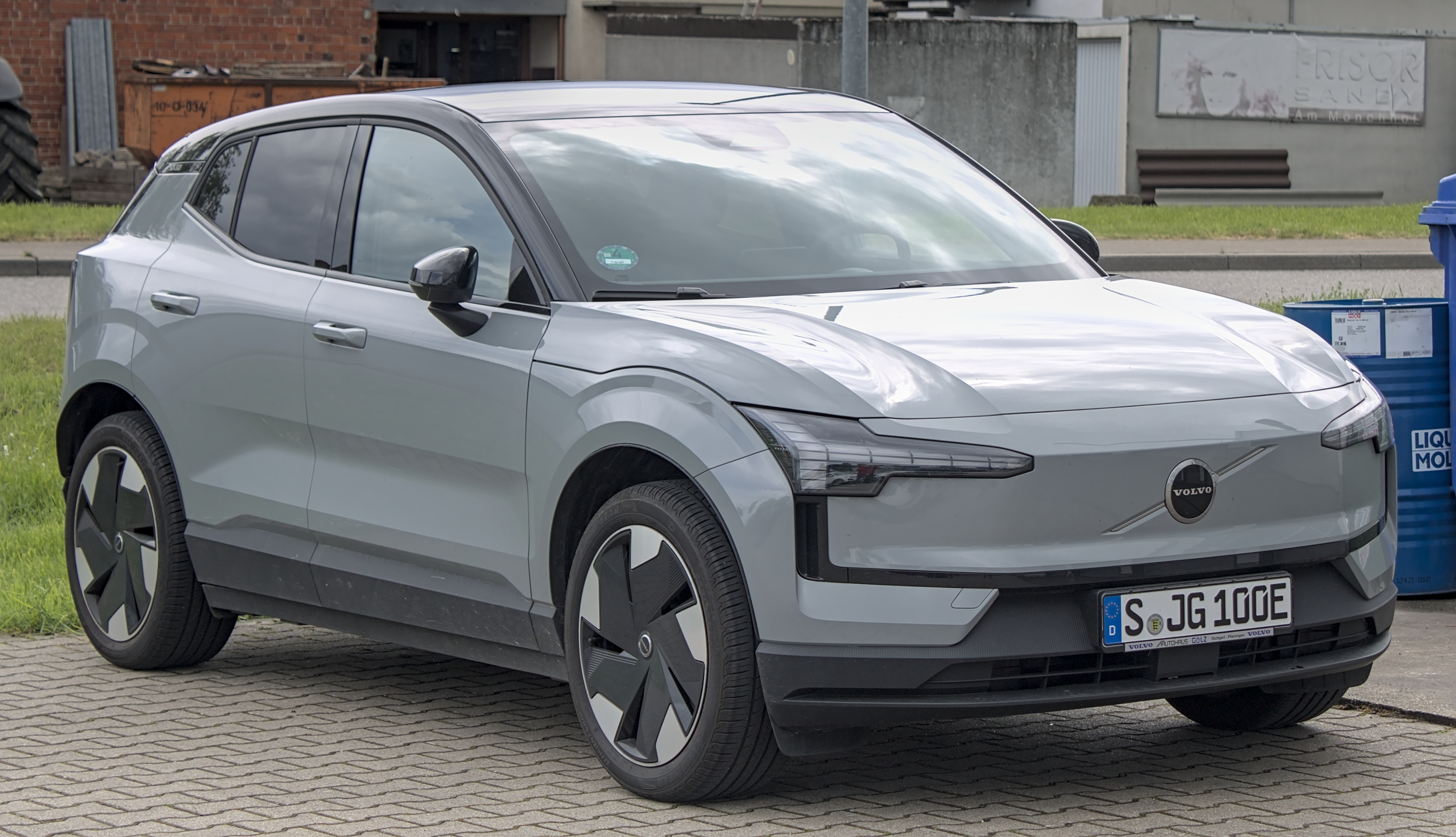

Overview
- Manufacturer: Volvo Cars
- Production: 2023–present
- Model years: 2025–2026 (US); 2025–present (Canada)
- Assembly: China: Zhangjiakou (Zhangjiakou Volvo Motor Company) / Chengdu (ZAMC; Final Assembly), from 2023; Belgium: Ghent (VCG); Malaysia: Shah Alam (VCMM)

Body and chassis
- Class: Subcompact crossover SUV (B)
- Body style: 5-door hatchback
- Layout: Rear-motor, rear-wheel-drive; Dual-motor, all-wheel-drive
- Platform: Sustainable Experience Architecture 2 (SEA2)
- Related: Smart #1; Zeekr X; Lynk & Co Z20

Powertrain
- Electric motor: 1× or 2× permanent magnet synchronous
- Battery: 51 kWh LFP Rept Battero; 69 kWh NMC Sunwoda
- Electric range: EX30: 250–261 mi (402–420 km) (EPA); 344–460 km (214–286 mi) (WLTP); 410–590 km (255–367 mi) (CLTC); Cross Country: 203–227 mi (327–365 km) (EPA); 436–437 km (271–272 mi) (WLTP); 430 km (267 mi) (CLTC)

Dimensions
- Wheelbase: 2,650 mm (104.3 in)
- Length: 4,233 mm (166.7 in)
- Width: 1,836 mm (72.3 in); 1,850 mm (72.8 in) (Cross Country)
- Height: 1,550 mm (61.0 in); 1,573 mm (61.9 in) (Cross Country)
- Curb weight: 1,830–1,943 kg (4,034–4,284 lb)

Chronology
- Predecessor: Volvo C30 DRIVe Electric

The Volvo EX30 is a battery electric subcompact crossover SUV manufactured by Volvo Cars. Revealed in June 2023, the EX30 is the smallest Volvo vehicle currently on sale, positioned below the XC40 and C40 crossovers. It is produced in China and Belgium and is related to the Zeekr X and the Smart #1, which are similar in size and developed from Geely's SEA platform. The vehicle is sold globally.

== Overview ==
In November 2022, the EX30 was first shown in teaser images alongside the Volvo EX90.

The EX30 was revealed on June 7, 2023. It is 4,233 mm (166.7 in) long with a 2,650 mm (104.3 in) wheelbase, creating short overhangs on the front and rear. It has a ground clearance of 177 mm (7.0 in) unladen. With a 0–100 km/h (0–62 mph) figure of 3.4 seconds, the EX30 Twin Motor Performance variant is the fastest accelerating Volvo ever made.

According to Volvo, the model has the smallest lifetime carbon footprint of any Volvo model to date at 30 tonnes (66,000 lb) over 200,000 km (124,000 mi) miles of driving for both production and operation. It has been achieved in part through a body that contains 25% recycled aluminium, 17% recycled steel and 17% recycled plastic. Being an entry-level model, the company expects around three-quarters of EX30 buyers will be new to the brand.

The vehicle comes with wireless phone charging and USB-C ports in the cabin, as well as a 12-volt power outlet. It also comes with a vertically mounted 12.3-inch tablet-style infotainment screen, which is based on Google's Android Automotive system. It is compatible with Apple CarPlay and Android Auto. The EX30's rivals in European markets include the Jeep Avenger EV and Kia Niro EV.

The EX30 has been produced in China since its launch. In 2025, the car began production in Ghent, Belgium and in Shah Alam, Malaysia, to increase its global production output in line with the company's plan to produce cars closer to markets.

In the United States, the EX30 will be discontinued after the 2026 model year, resulting in a two-year span. Volvo did not provide a reason, though sources speculated that US tariffs combined with slowing EV sales after the removal of tax credits were both factors. The EX30 will continue to be sold in Canada and Mexico. Volvo later announced that they would be developing a replacement for the EX30 specifically for the US market that would debut in 2027.

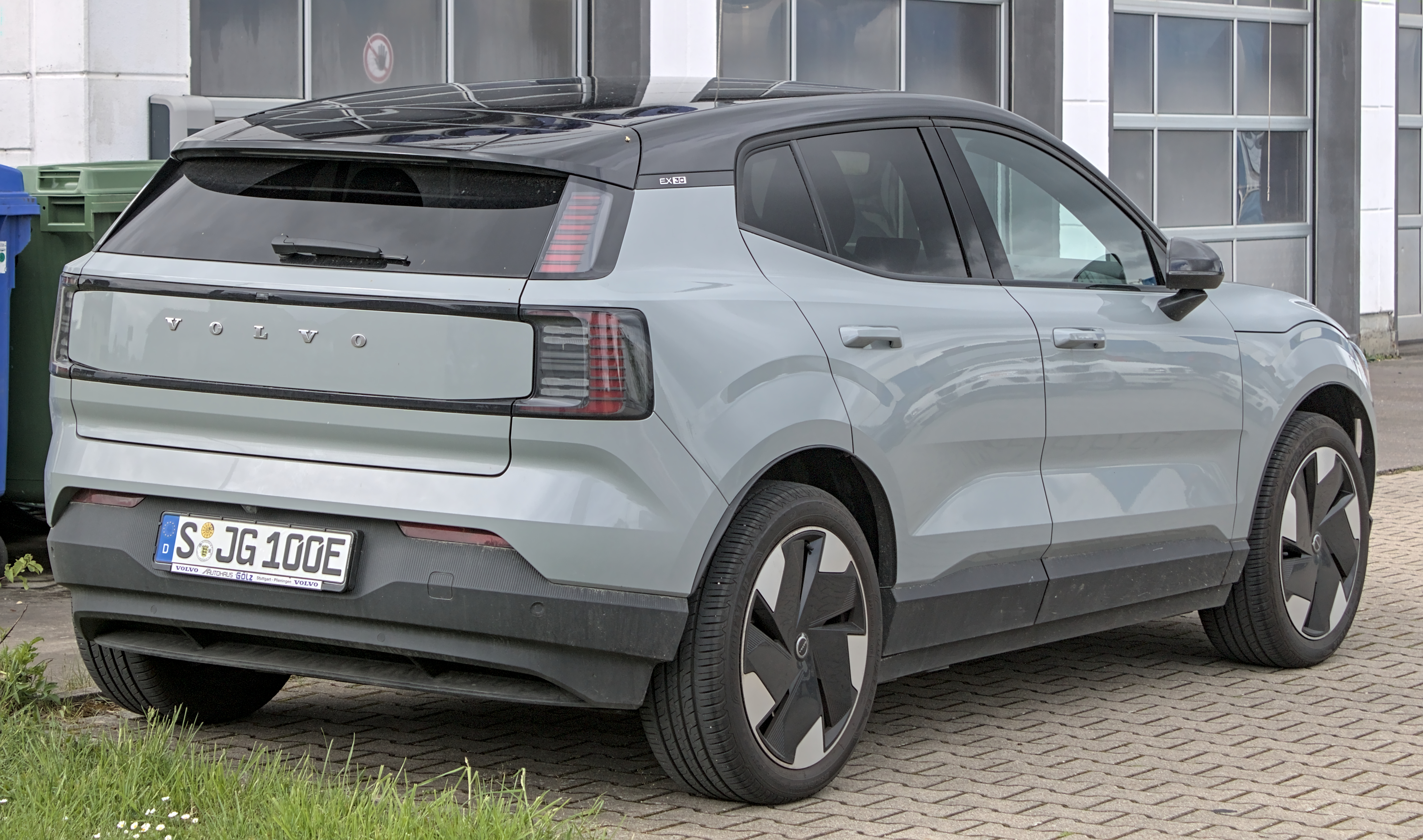
Rear view

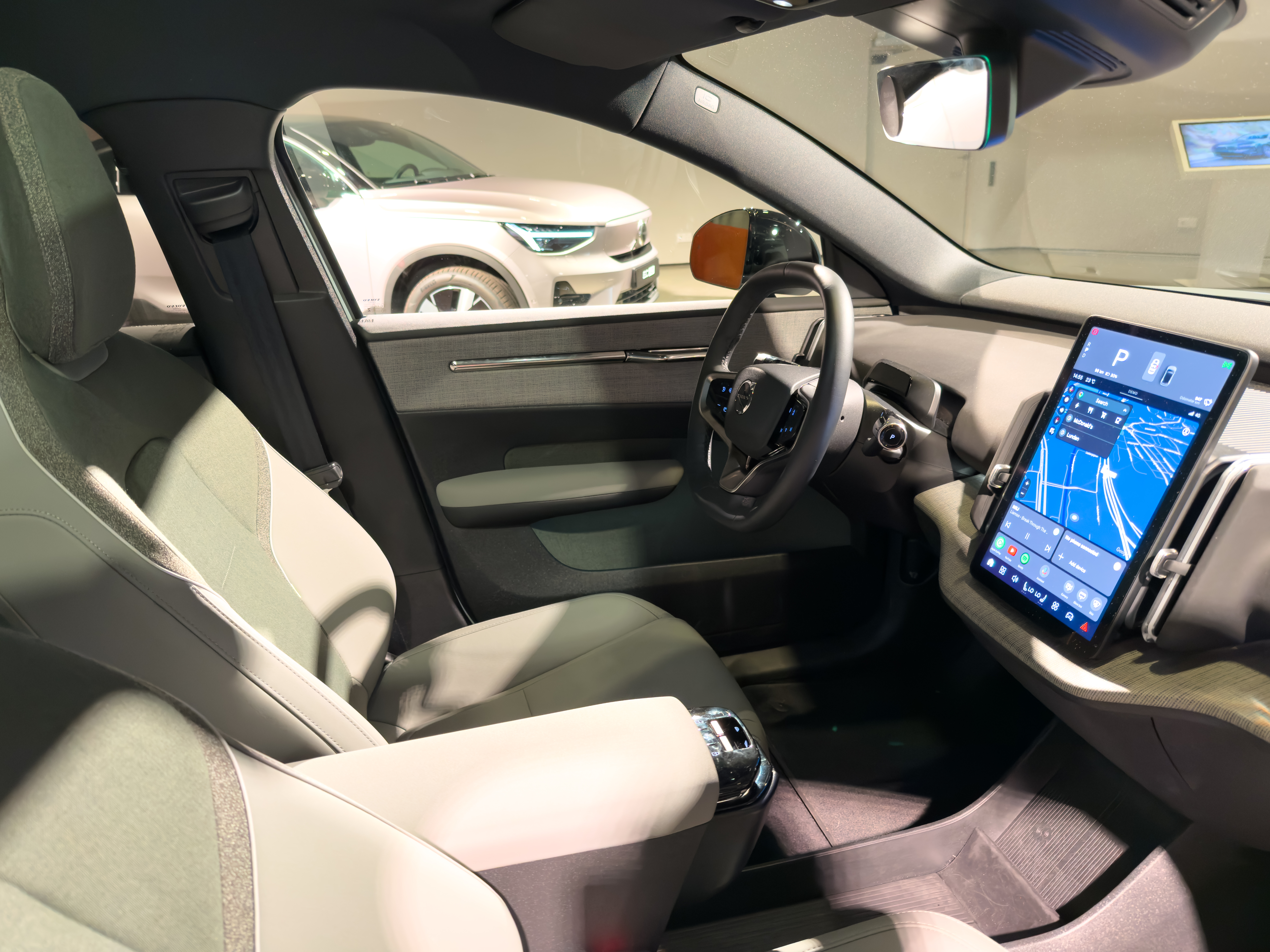
Interior

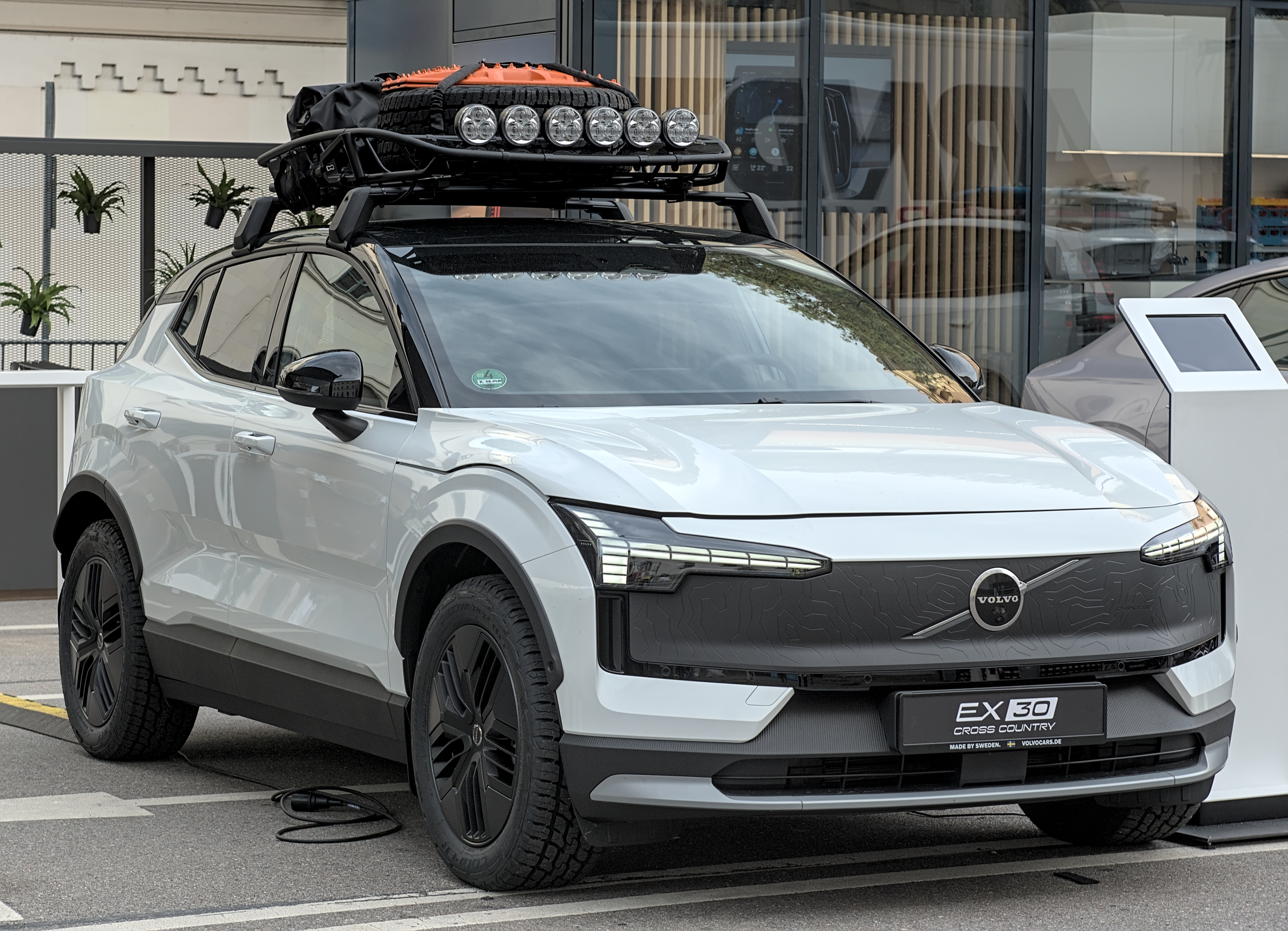
Volvo EX30 Cross Country

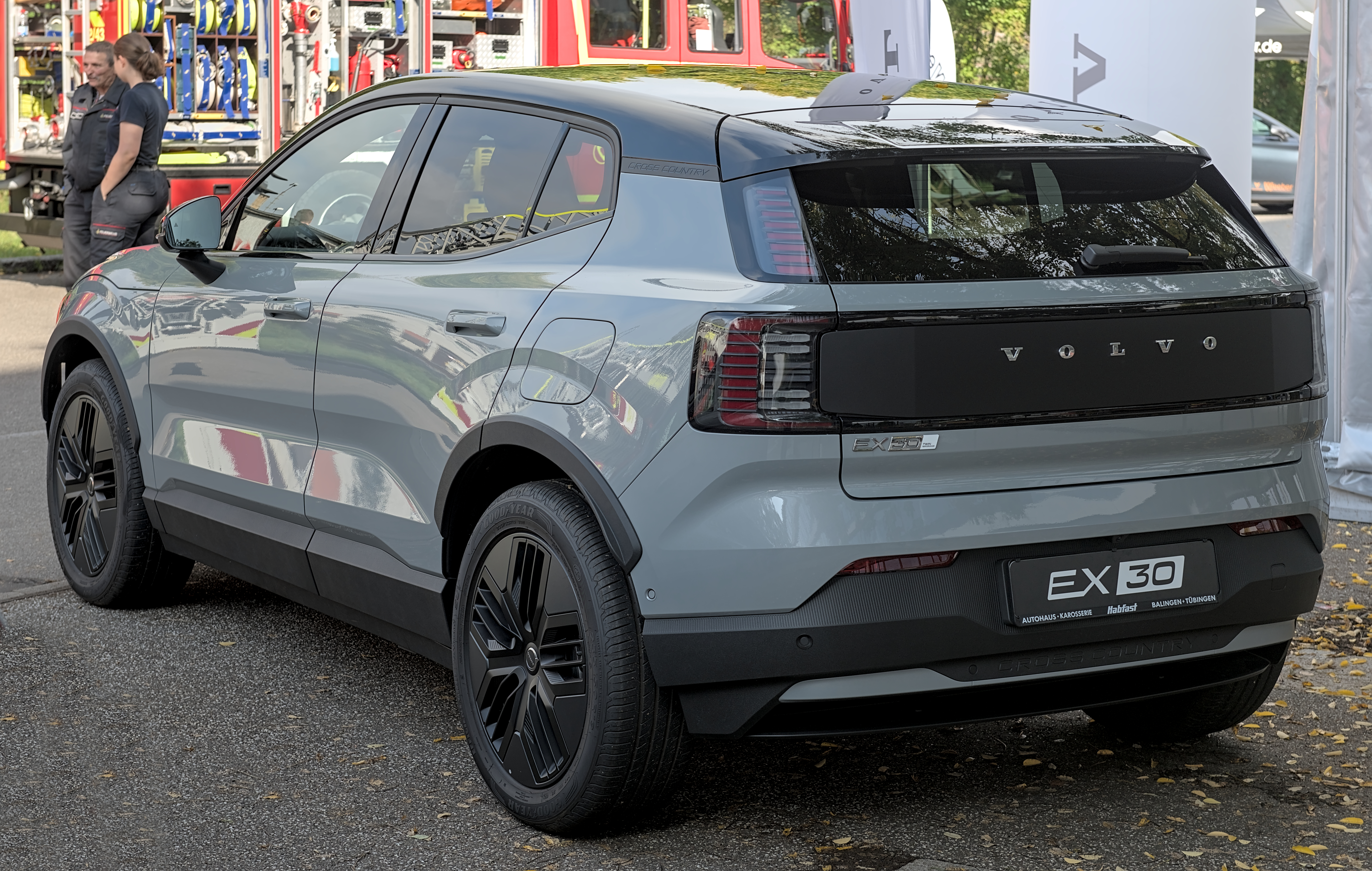
Rear view

== Powertrain ==
The EX30 is available as rear-wheel drive or all-wheel drive, with an electric motor on each axle. The dual-motor all-wheel drive version of the EX30 reaches 0 to 100 km/h (0 to 62 mph) in 3.6 seconds, and has a top speed of 180 km/h (112 mph).

=== Specifications ===
Electric details
| Model | Production | Battery | | | | Drive | Power | Torque | DC Charging | | Range | | | 0–100 km/h (62 mph) | Top speed |
| Model | Production | Chemistry | Usable | Gross | Weight | Drive | Power | Torque | Peak | 10–80% | WLTP | EPA | CLTC | 0–100 km/h (62 mph) | Top speed |
|---|---|---|---|---|---|---|---|---|---|---|---|---|---|---|---|
| Single Motor | 2023–present | Lithium iron phosphate | 49 kWh | 51 kWh | 409.5 kg (903 lb) | RWD | Global: 200 kW (268 hp); US: 185 kW (248 hp); TR: 150 kW (201 hp); SG (Cat A): 110 kW (148 hp) | 343 N⋅m (253 lb⋅ft) | 134 kW | 26 min | 344 km (214 mi) | 200 mi (322 km) | 410 km (255 mi) | Global: 5.7s; US: 6.0s; TR: 6.5s; SG: 8.6s | 180 km/h (112 mph) |
| Single Motor Extended Range | 2023–present | Nickel manganese cobalt | 64 kWh | 69 kWh | 390 kg (860 lb) | RWD | Global: 200 kW (268 hp); US: 185 kW (248 hp); TR: 150 kW (201 hp); SG (Cat A): 110 kW (148 hp) | 343 N⋅m (253 lb⋅ft) | 153 kW | 28 min | 480 km (298 mi) | 257–261 mi (414–420 km) | 590 km (367 mi) | Global: 5.3s; SG: 8.3s | 180 km/h (112 mph) |
| Twin Motor Performance | 2023–present | Nickel manganese cobalt | 64 kWh | 69 kWh | 390 kg (860 lb) | AWD | 315 kW (422 hp) | 543 N⋅m (400 lb⋅ft) | 153 kW | 28 min | 460 km (286 mi) | 250–253 mi (402–407 km) | 540 km (336 mi) | 3.6s | 180 km/h (112 mph) |
| Cross Country Twin Motor Performance | 2025–present | Nickel manganese cobalt | 64 kWh | 69 kWh | 390 kg (860 lb) | AWD | 315 kW (422 hp) | 543 N⋅m (400 lb⋅ft) | 153 kW | 28 min | 436 km (271 mi) | 203–227 mi (327–365 km) | 530 km (329 mi) | 3.7s | 180 km/h (112 mph) |

== Trim levels ==
In Europe, three trim levels are offered from launch. Plus models come with automatic LED headlights, adaptive cruise control, two-zone climate control and heated front seats. Ultra models receive additional equipment, such as a 360 degree camera, park pilot assist, optional 20 inch wheels (19 inch as standard) and a panoramic sunroof. Another model called Core was later released, providing only a single motor (with the option of an Extended Range Battery) like the Plus, but with 18 inch alloys, while still keeping all safety features intact.

A budget-oriented trim known as Essential cuts down much of the features such as the aero-rim inserts, the option of an Extended Range battery, frunk, and also driving-comfort features such as the adaptive cruise control.

The Cross Country is off-road styled, and has raised ground clearance, which was released in 2025.

== Safety ==
Park Pilot Assist finds available parking spaces, displays them on the center display for the driver to select, and maneuvers the vehicle into the space. The EX30 uses rear radars to detect cyclists and scooters approaching from behind and will sound an alert if an occupant tries to open a door. During highway driving, Pilot Assist will change lanes, maintain a safe distance from adjacent vehicles while passing, and adapt the vehicle's speed to maintain its distance from the vehicle directly in front. It will prompt the driver to steer and escalate warnings if it detects an unresponsive driver. No response will make the car come to a complete stop. Collision avoidance systems help avoid or mitigate collisions with other vehicles, pedestrians, and cyclists. It will send audio and visual alerts and brake pulse warnings when a collision risk is detected. If a collision is imminent or the car turns into the path of an oncoming vehicle at an intersection, the car will brake automatically. In some situations, it will steer the car to avoid a collision.

An infrared sensor on the steering column tracks the driver's eye and head movements, including how fast or slow they blink and how often. This, along with a front-facing camera watching the road to detect erratic driving and a sensor monitoring the steering wheel can detect distracted or drowsy drivers and the car will prompt the driver saying it's time to focus or take a break.

In 2026, Volvo issued a vehicle recall on some markets for the EX30 in relation to an issue concerning the high voltage battery which could result in high energy fires, it is understood that Volvo announced to owners of certain EX30 versions (including the long-range version) that they must not charge their battery past 70%, lest the battery overheats and catches fire,.

ANCAP test results Volvo EX30 (2024, aligned with Euro NCAP)
| Test | Points | % |
|---|---|---|
| Overall: | 5 /5 stars | |
| Adult occupant: | 35.27 | 88% |
| Child occupant: | 42.03 | 85% |
| Pedestrian: | 50.36 | 79% |
| Safety assist: | 14.48 | 80% |

Euro NCAP test results Volvo EX30 Plus, Single Motor Extended Range (2024)
| Test | Points | % |
|---|---|---|
| Overall: | 5 /5 stars | |
| Adult occupant: | 35.3 | 88% |
| Child occupant: | 42 | 85% |
| Pedestrian: | 50.4 | 79% |
| Safety assist: | 14.4 | 80% |

== Sustainable materials ==
Volvo EX30 uses various recycled metals across the car, including steel and aluminium. Several recycled and renewable materials are used to upholster the seats, dashboard and doors, including old denim, flax and a wool blend that also contains approximately 70% recycled polyester. Around one fifth of the plastics are recycled.

The Volvo EX30 has the smallest carbon footprint of any electric Volvo to date, less than half of the petrol XC40.

== Awards ==
- Carwow Car of the Year 2024
- Electrifying.com Car of the Year 2024
- Top Gear Eco Warrior of the Year 2023
- Autosprint best city car 2024
- Auto Gids Best electric city car 2023
- The Sun Car of the Year 2023
- Popular Science Best of What's New 2023
- The Sunday Times Small SUV of the Year award
- World Urban Car 2024 by World Car Awards
- Red Dot 'Best of the Best' Design Award in 2024
- Auto Express 'Small Premium SUV of the Year' in 2025

== Sales ==
| Year | China | US |
|---|---|---|
| 2024 | 1,597 | 240 |
| 2025 | 1,456 | 5,409 |
