= Audi S5 =

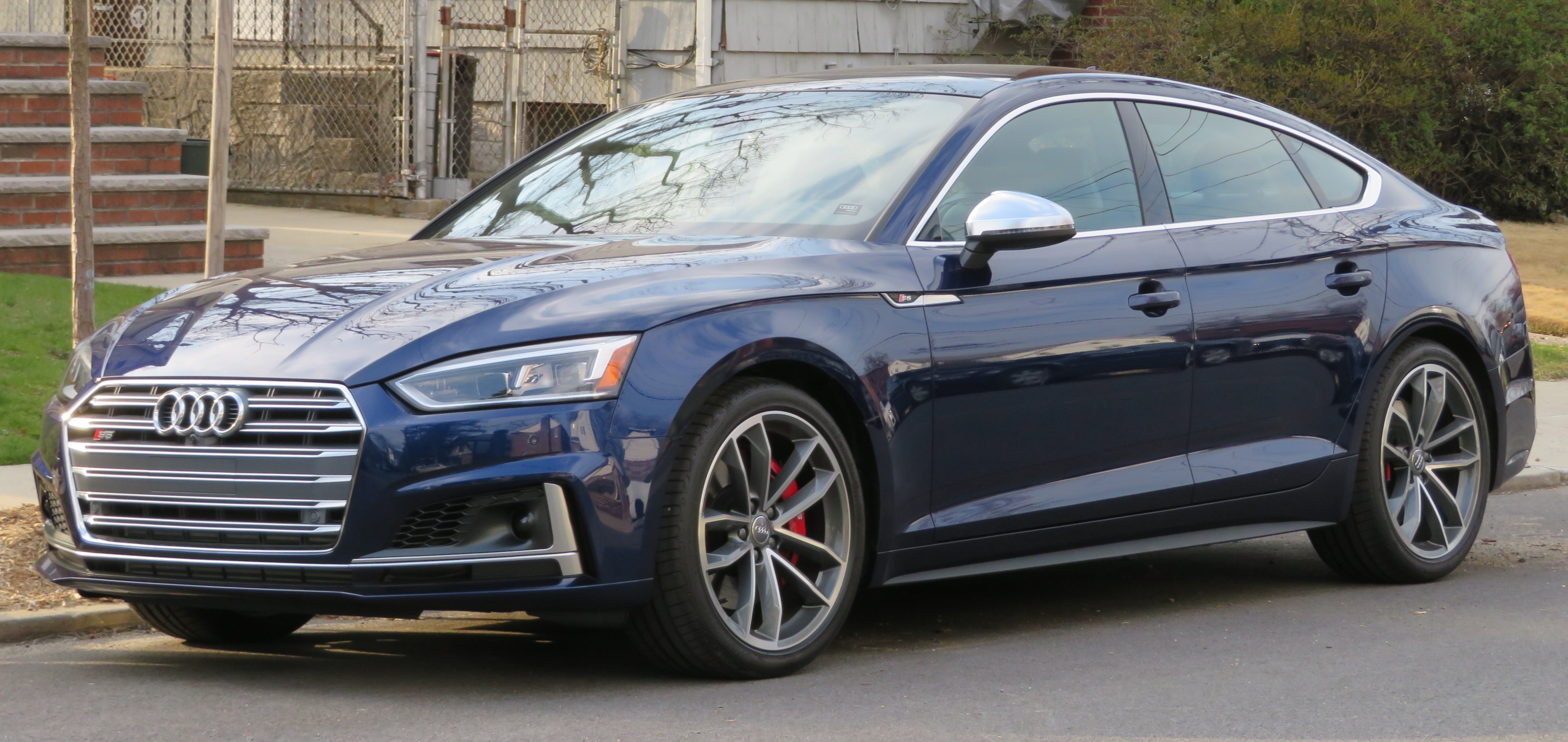

Overview
- Manufacturer: Audi AG
- Production: 2007–present
- Assembly: Germany: Ingolstadt; Germany: Neckarsulm
- Designer: Walter de Silva

Body and chassis
- Class: Compact executive car (D); Grand tourer (S) (2007–2024)
- Body style: 2-door coupé (2007–2024); 2-door convertible (2007–2024); 5-door fastback sedan (2007–present); 5-door estate/wagon (Avant) (2024–present)
- Layout: Front-engine, quattro permanent four-wheel drive
- Platform: MLB/MLP (2007–2024); PPC (2024–present)
- Related: Audi A5

Powertrain
- Engine: 3.0 L CAKA/CCBA V6 T FSI; 3.0 L CWGD V6 T FSI; 3.0 L TDI V6 diesel (2019–2024, European markets only); 4.2 L CAU V8 FSI
- Transmission: 6-speed manual; 8-speed ZF 8HP Tiptronic automatic; 7-speed S tronic semi-automatic

Dimensions
- Wheelbase: Coupé & Cabriolet: 2,751 mm (108.3 in); Sportback: 2,811 mm (110.7 in)
- Length: Coupé & Cabriolet: 4,640 mm (183 in); Sportback: 4,718 mm (185.7 in)
- Width: 1,854 mm (73.0 in)
- Height: Coupé: 1,369 mm (53.9 in); Cabriolet: 1,380 mm (54 in); Sportback: 1,382 mm (54.4 in)
- Kerb weight: Coupé: 1,750 kg (3,860 lb); Cabriolet: 1,955 kg (4,310 lb); Sportback: 1,820 kg (4,010 lb)

Chronology
- Predecessor: Audi S4 Cabriolet (B7) (S5 Cabriolet)

The Audi S5 is one of two high-performance variants of Audi's A5. The B8 and B9 generations were marketed as the coupé, cabriolet, and five-door fastback sedan versions of the B8 and B9 Audi S4 saloon and estate models, while the B10 S5 is the direct replacement of the B9 S4 models.

Like all Audi "S" cars, they are only available with Audi's quattro four-wheel drive (4WD) system, which, in the S5, uses a Torsen-based centre differential system.

Most versions of the S5 are manufactured at Audi's plant in Ingolstadt, Germany; they are available as a coupé, cabriolet, and five-door Sportback, which was previously not available in North America until the 2018 model year, which was released in the United States in mid 2017. The cabriolets are built at Audi's factory in Neckarsulm, Germany.

== S5 B8/8T (2007–2012) ==
The Audi S5 was released in coupé form to the public at the same time as the A5. The Audi S5 Sportback was unveiled at the 2009 Frankfurt Motor Show, and went on sale in the spring of 2009 with an MSRP of €57,900.

In comparison to the A5, the S5 features a more aggressive design (typical of Audi S and RS models) which consists of side skirts and a pair of dual-tip exhausts. The S5 includes a string of LED daytime running lights around the bi-Xenon headlamps and a vertically striped chrome grille. In many markets, the S5 includes as standard 19" alloy wheels with a five-parallel spoke design, larger brakes, heated leather sport bucket seats, and other convenience features, some of which are only available as an option on the A5. Changes for the 2010 model year included LED tail lamps, the introduction of Premium Plus and Prestige trim levels and new optional equipment such as leather/Alcantara seats.

Despite sharing the same nameplate, the powertrains were different between the Coupé and the Cabriolet/Sportback for the 2010–2012 model years. The 2007–2012 Audi S5 Coupé had a 4.2-litre Fuel Stratified Injection (FSI) V8 engine that produced 260 kW (349 hp), while the S5 Cabriolet and Sportback have a supercharged 3.0-litre TFSI V6 engine producing 245 kW (329 hp) which was shared with the 2010 Audi S4 3.0 TFSI quattro Sedan and Avant. The Coupé had a choice of either a 6-speed manual or 6-speed Tiptronic, while the Cabriolet/Sportback have the 7-speed S-tronic dual-clutch transmission. Despite minor differences in peak power output, both the V8 and the supercharged V6 provide very similar performance.

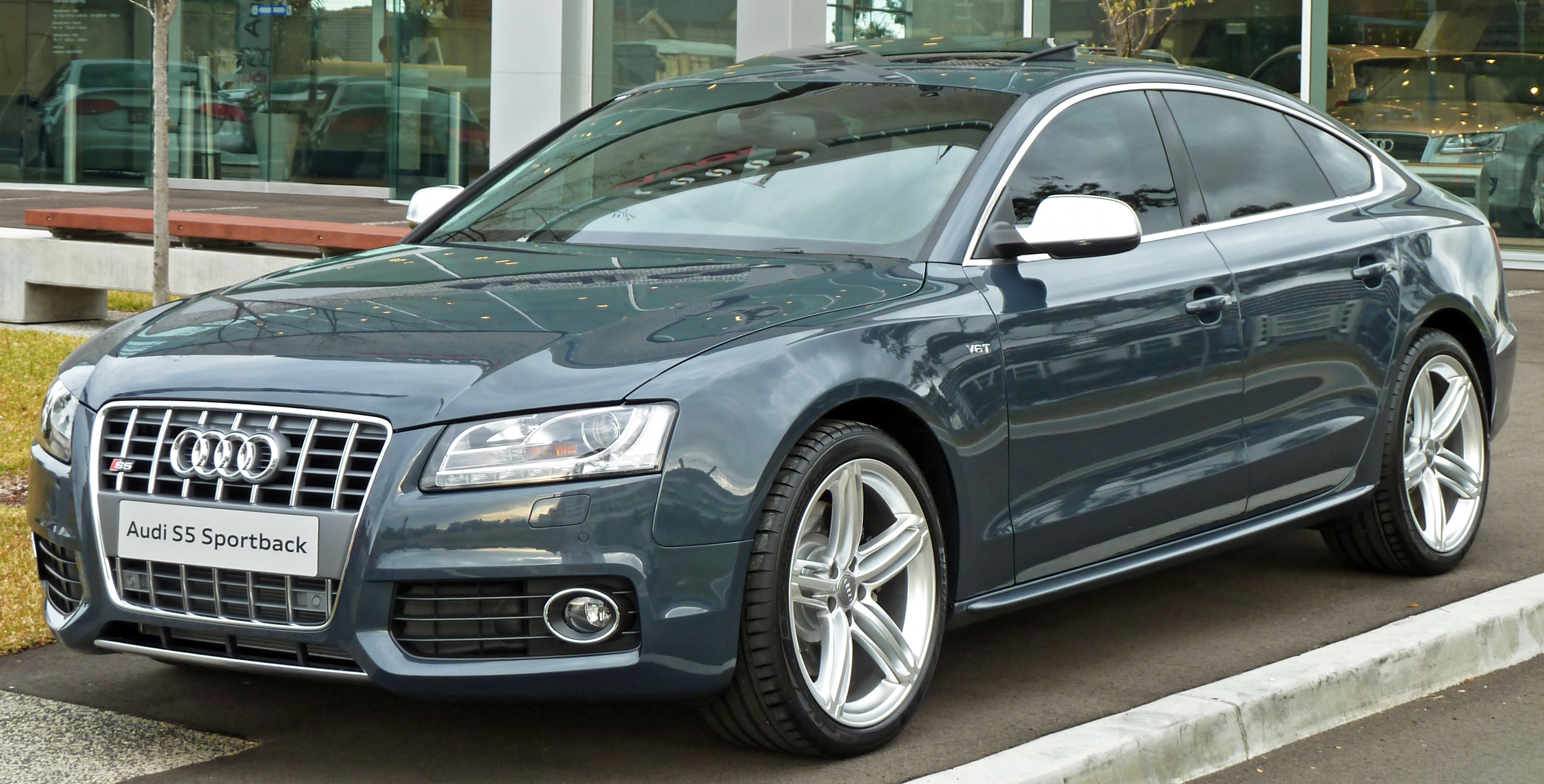
Sportback

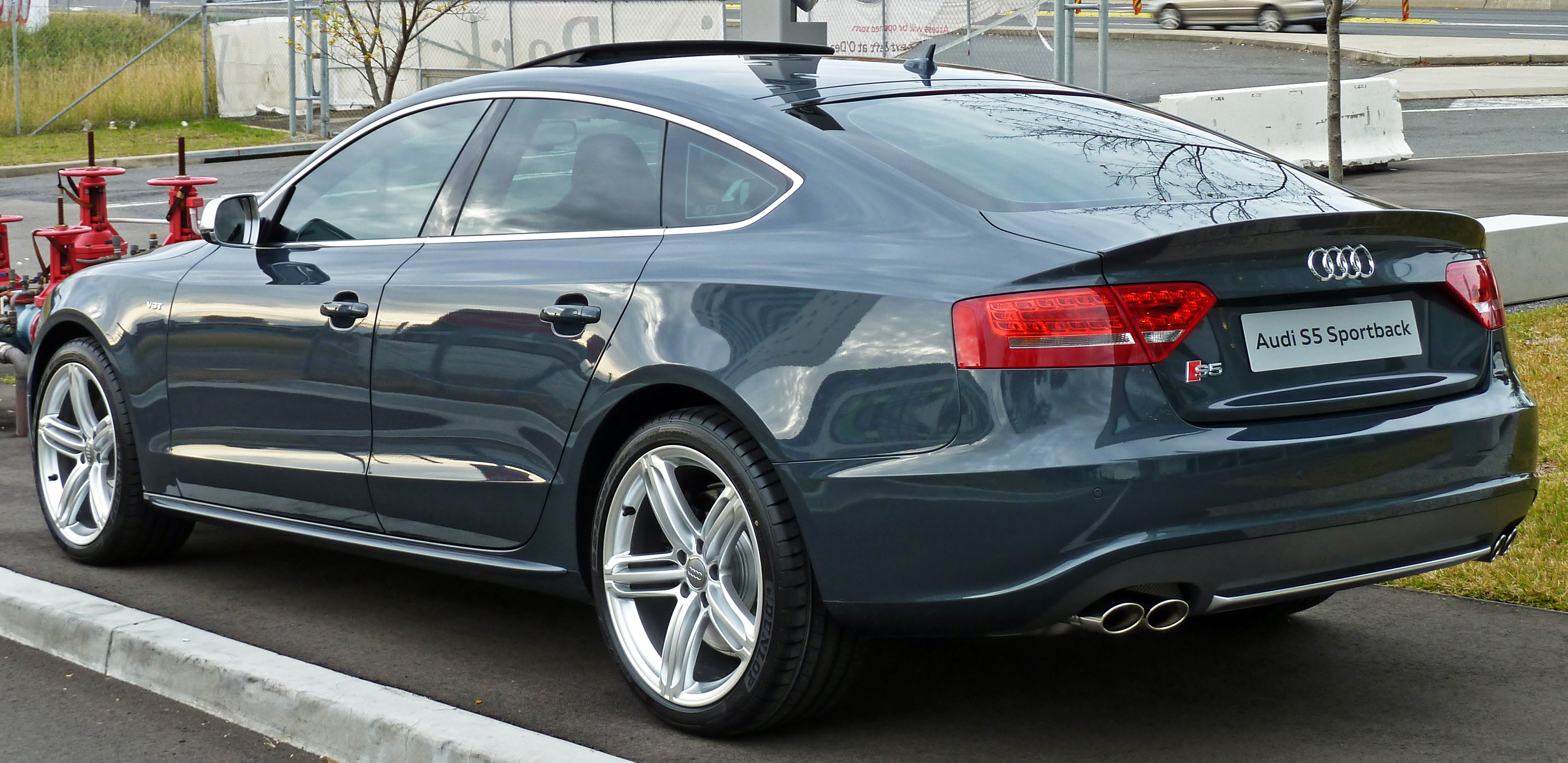
Sportback

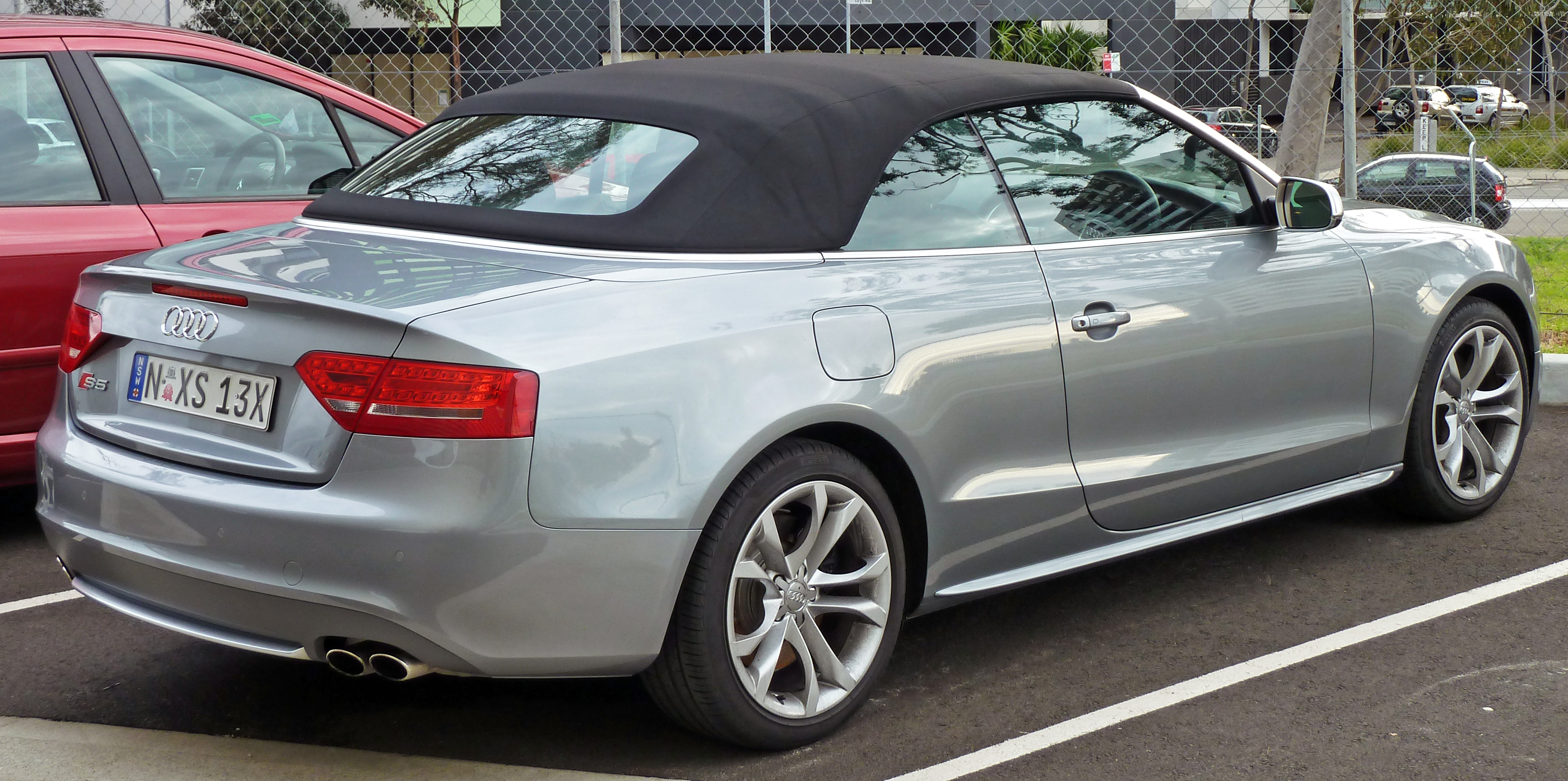
Convertible

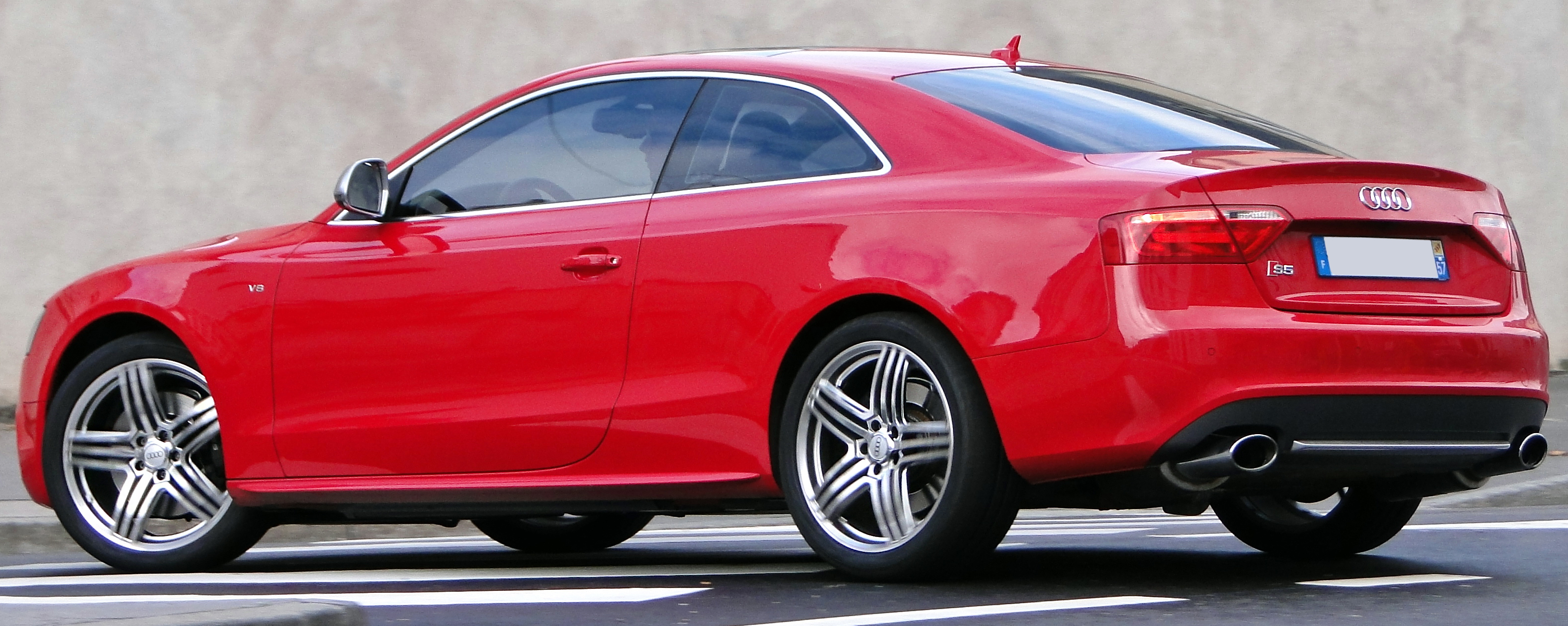
Coupé

=== S5 B8.5/8.5T (2012–2017) ===
The (B8.5/8.5T or Facelift) Audi S5 went through a mid-generational refresh alongside the standard Audi A5. There are front-end changes, including a complete redesign of the headlights – this includes new LED DRL's, a brand-new grille loosely based on the 2012 Audi A6 grille and new fog lamps. Audi has also introduced a new rear diffuser that appears to be more cosmetic than the one found on previous models and updated LED tail light design.

Instead of the 4.2 FSI V8 engine producing 260 kW (349 hp), the facelifted S5 Coupé is powered by a 3.0-litre supercharged V6 TFSI engine producing 245 kW (329 hp), the latter which had been used in the S5 Cabriolet and S4 Sedan/Avant since the 2010 model year. The other major change under the bonnet is the introduction of stop-start technology for better fuel efficiency. Audi claims an average fuel economy of 8.9 L/100 km (32 mpg_{‑imp}; 26 mpg_{‑US}) (compared to the current 12.6 L/100 km [22.4 mpg_{‑imp}; 18.7 mpg_{‑US}] in the V8 Coupé and 10.7 L/100 km [26 mpg_{‑imp}; 22 mpg_{‑US}] in the Cabriolet).

Inside, the S5 receives some new features. Dials in the center console get the chrome treatment along with the edges of the buttons for the windows, four Audi MMI control buttons and Audi's 3G+ MMI which has a slightly refreshed interface and now features Google Earth maps. Audi has brought the shift knob from the RS5 to the S5. There is a shift from having four buttons down each side of the console, to just two with the addition of a Menu and Car buttons below the MMI control dial (Audi has removed the skip forward / backward buttons that previously occupied the space on either side of the back button). Lastly, a flat-bottom steering wheel style has a new circular airbag cover as well as piano black trim.

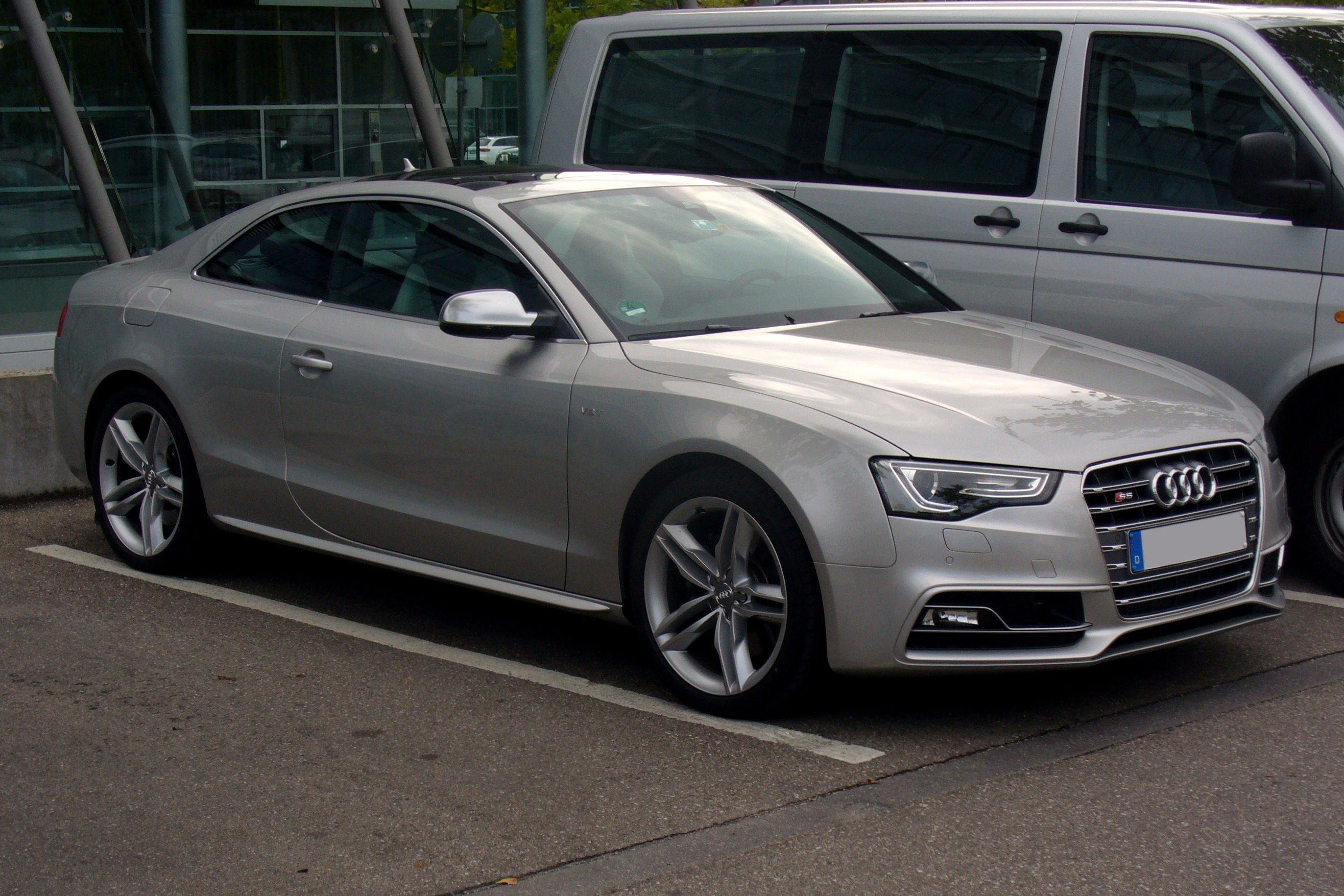
Coupé

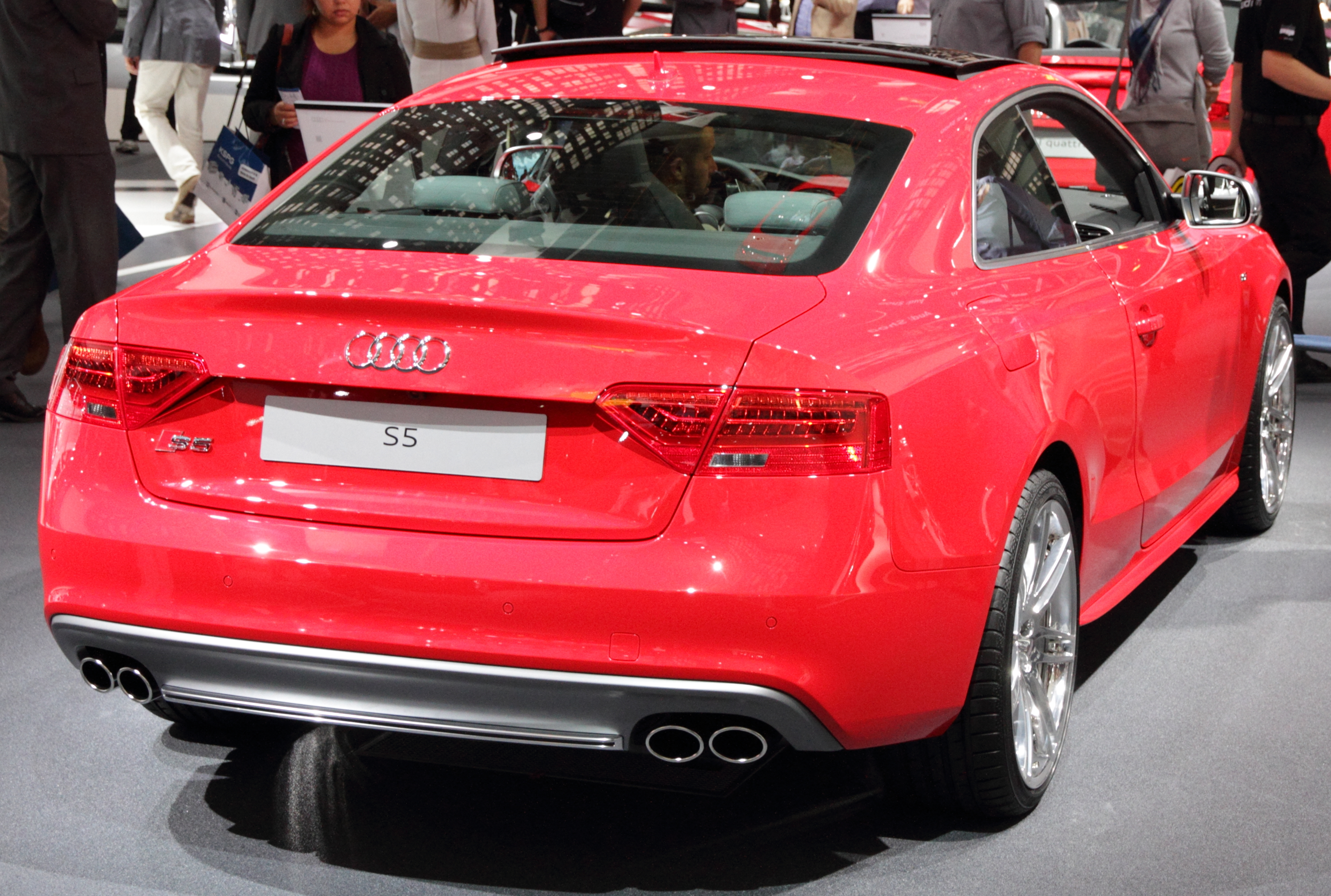
Coupé

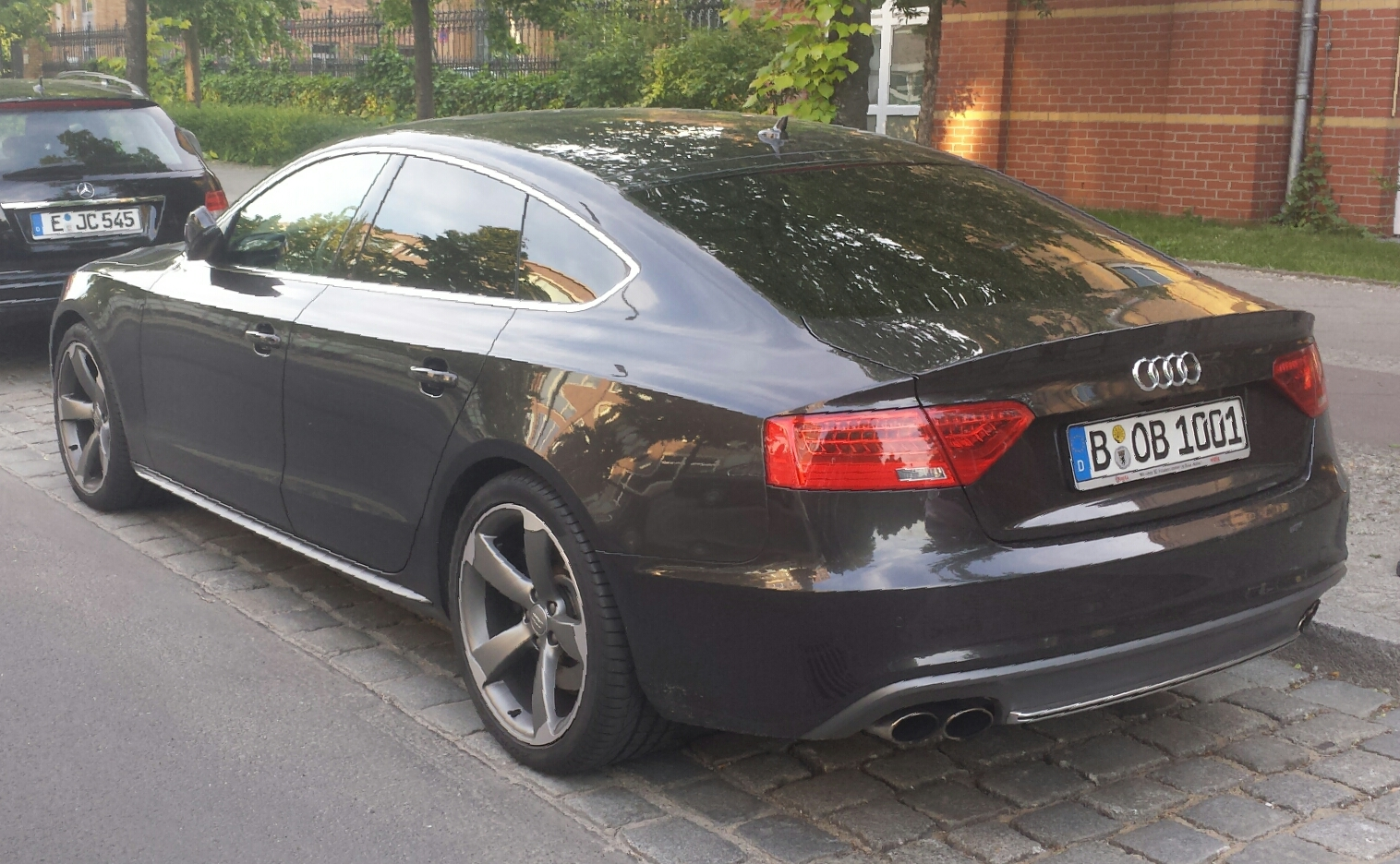
Sportback

Convertible

== S5 B9 (2017–2024) ==
The Audi S5 (B9) is an all-wheel drive coupé, Sportback, & cabriolet built by Audi from late 2017, after its unveiling in June 2016. Its Sportback trim adds rear doors and a hatchback rear. It is part of the second generation model line following on from the Audi S5 (B8) that had been in production since 2007.

As part of the refresh, the new S5 has undergone some major front and rear end changes, including a drop in weight to 1,615 kg (3,560 lb) (Coupé) and a complete redesign of the headlights and bonnet, LED front and rear lighting, sharper body lines, and a new larger one piece grille. There are also a number of optional safety options available such as drive assist and head up display. Inside, the S5 also receives some new features. A redesigned dashboard and centre console, updated tablet style 8" Audi MMI, Virtual Cockpit (optional), and features Google Earth maps and Apple CarPlay. The new S5 also has new electrically adjustable front heated seats with cross stitching, and has an optional flat-bottom steering wheel style with circular airbag cover as well as a variety of trim options.

Fitted with a completely new and more powerful 3-litre V6 petrol engine co-developed by Porsche, the S5 has direct injection as well as a twin-scroll turbocharger to reduce weight as well as cost. The turbocharger is mounted within the engine V and, as a result, has reduced turbo lag response times. The quattro all-wheel drive system receives power through a locking centre differential that splits torque sent to the wheels at 40% to the front and 60% to the rear. The system can also divert up to 70% to the front or up to 85% to the rear. 0–60 mph (0–97 km/h) time is around 4.4 seconds (Coupé) & 4.5 seconds (Sportback), with a limited top speed of 155 mph (249 km/h).

In 2019, Audi introduced a new facelifted version of the B9 for the 2020 models, the B9.5. In Europe, the new 2019 S5 was only made available with a diesel V6 TDI engine.

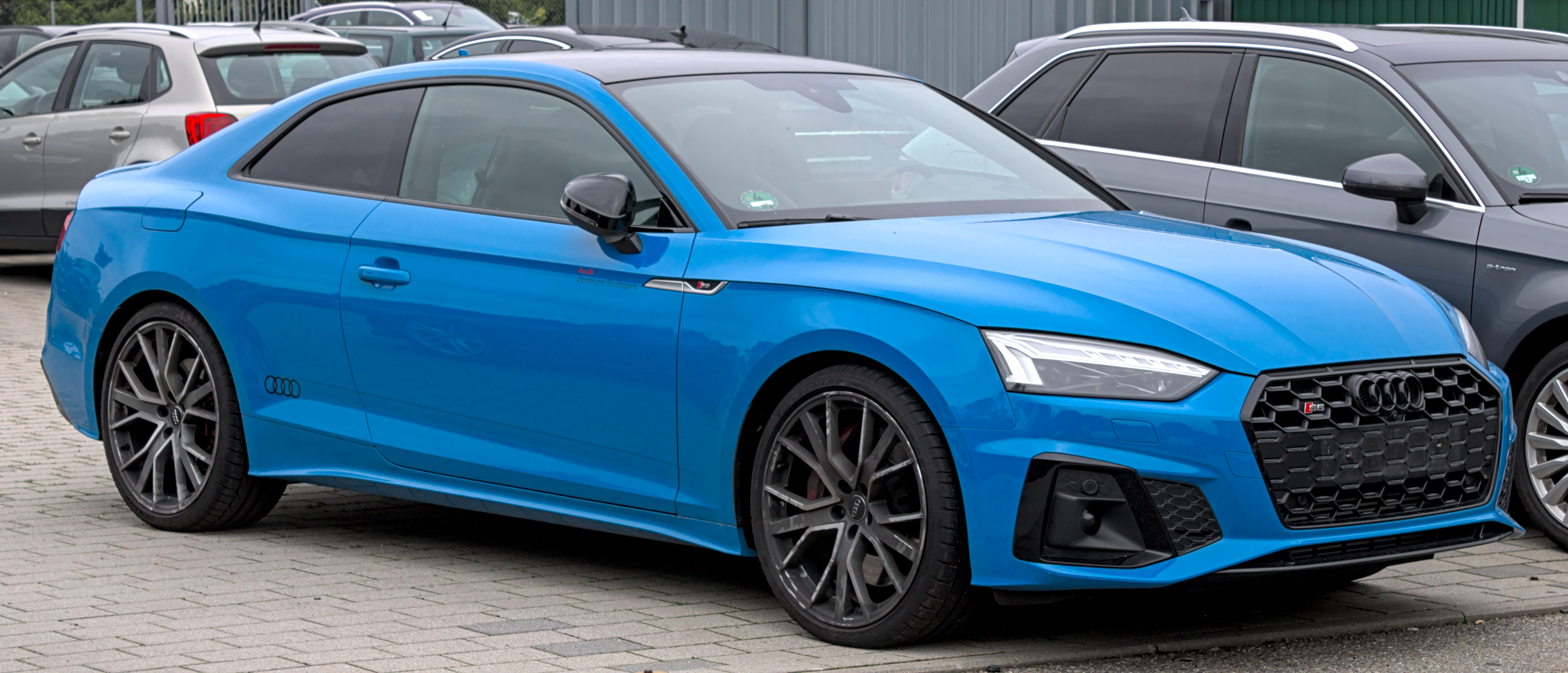
Coupé

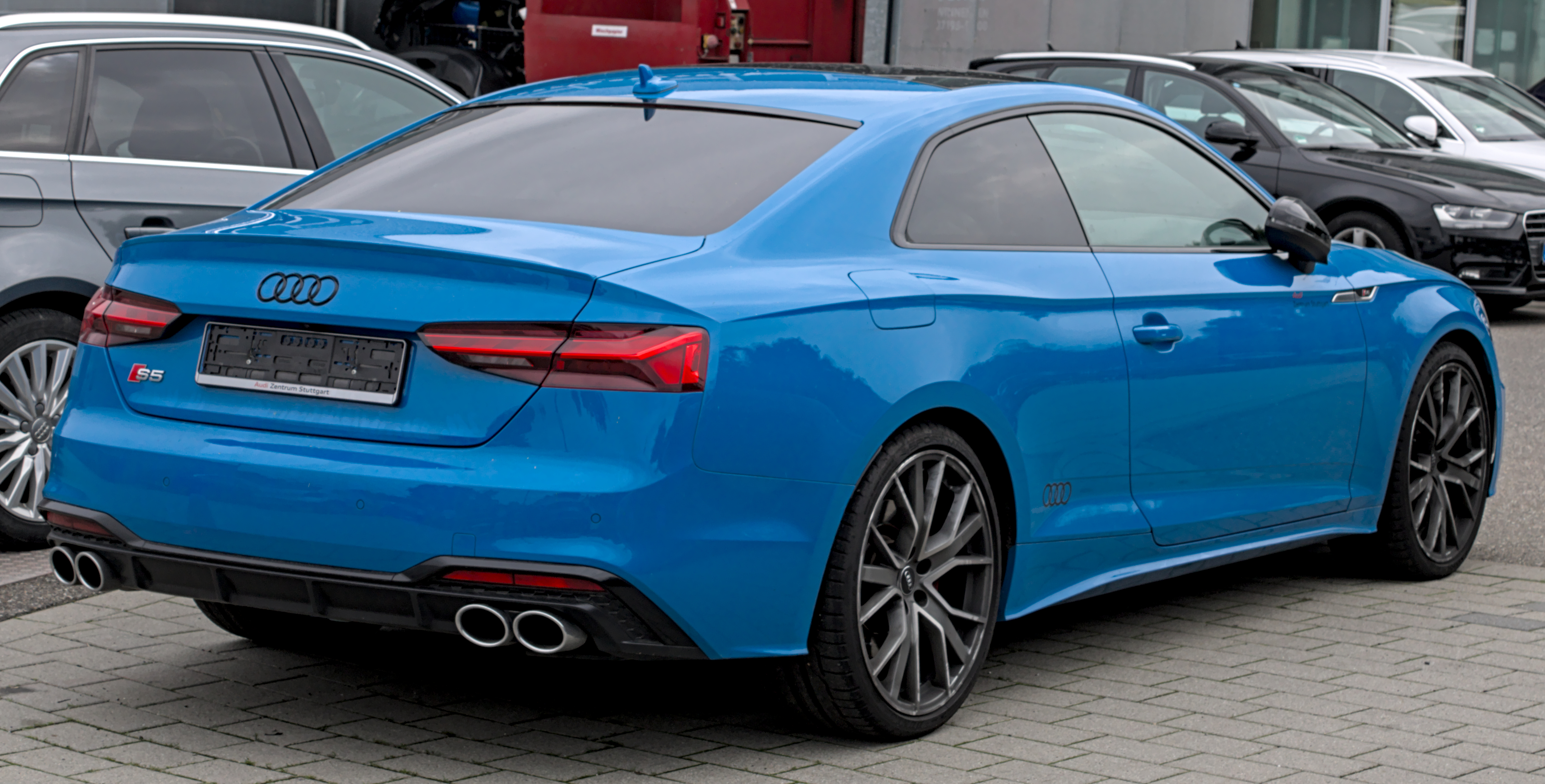
Coupé

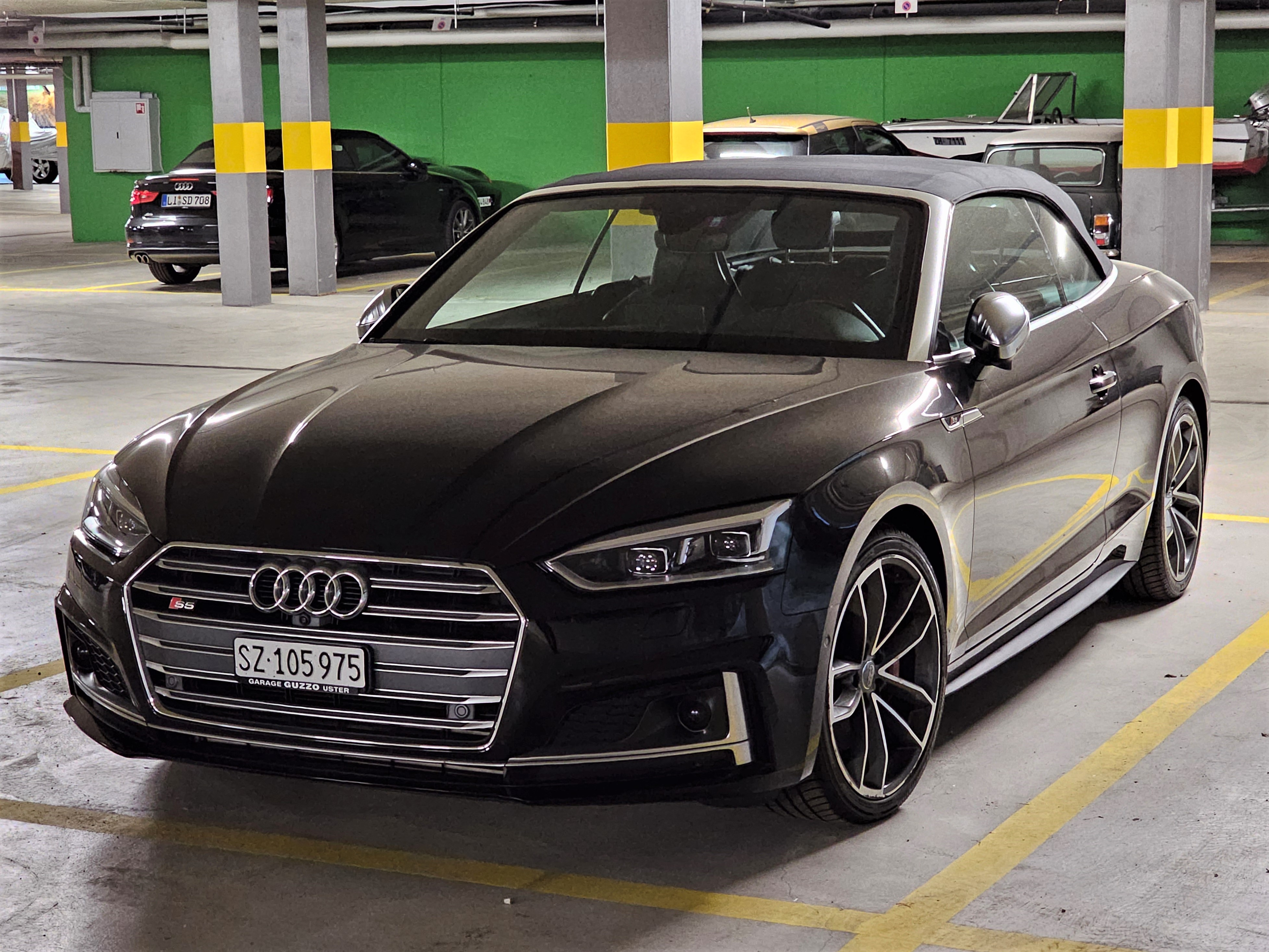
Convertible

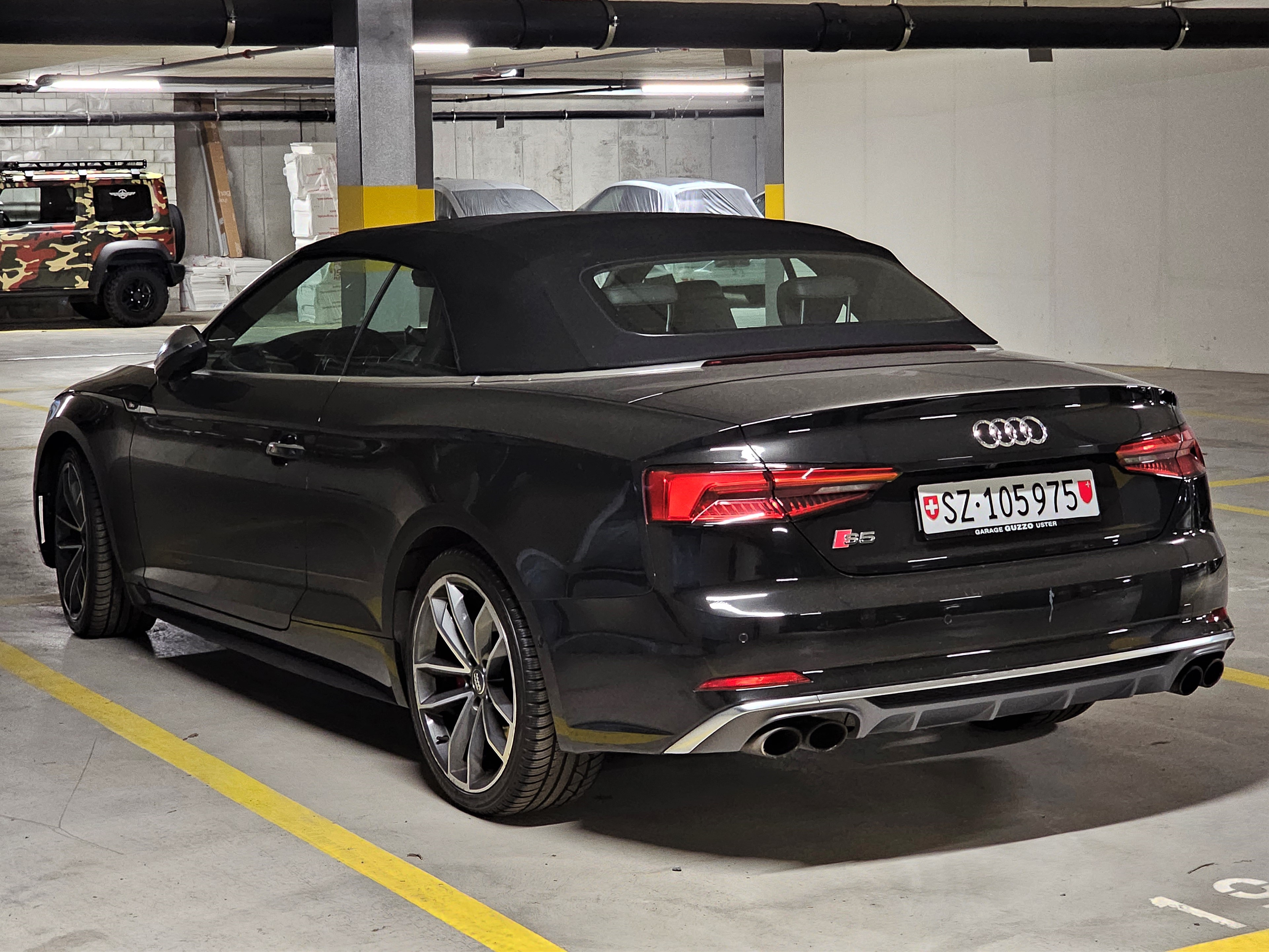
Convertible

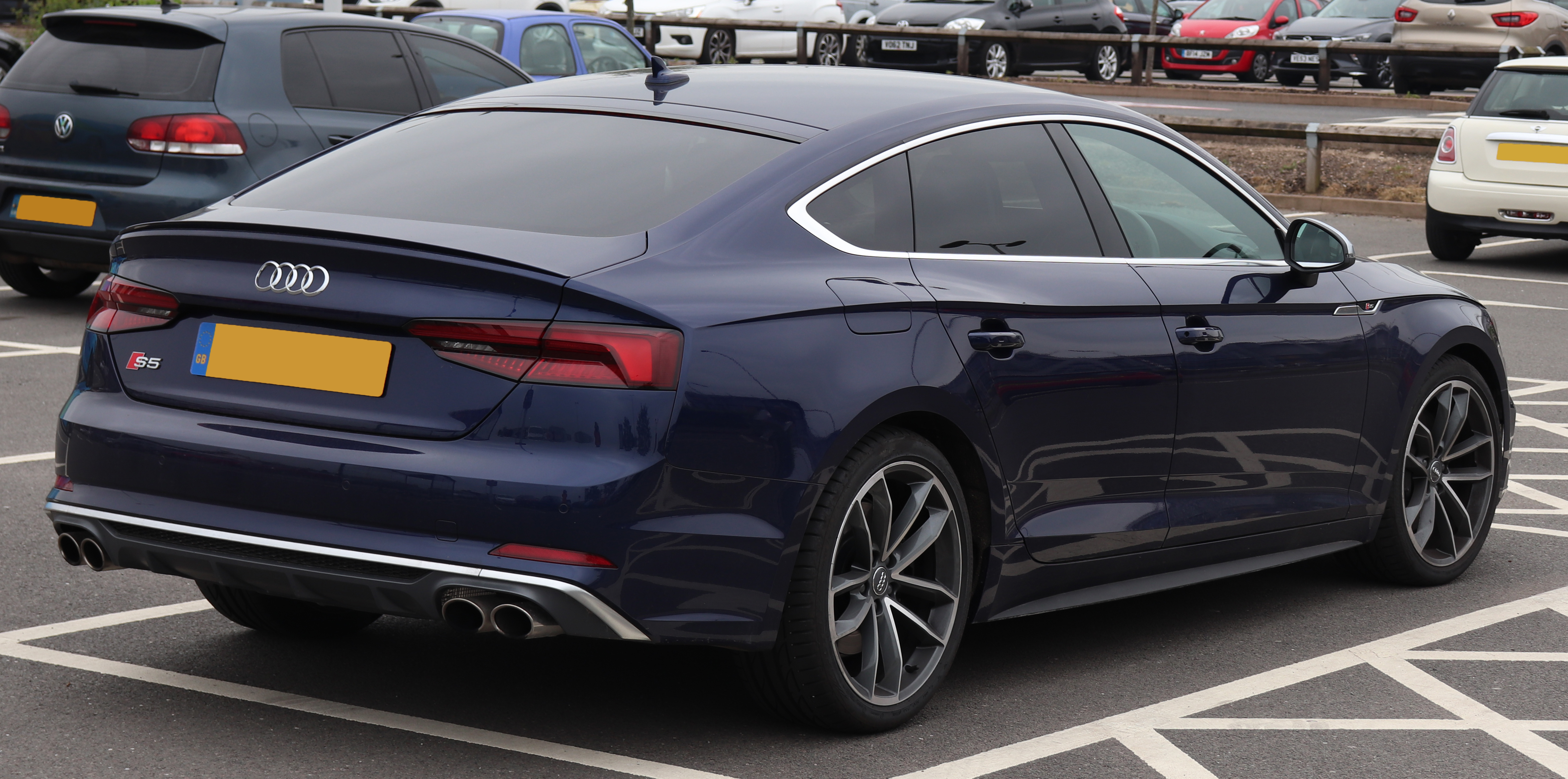
Sportback

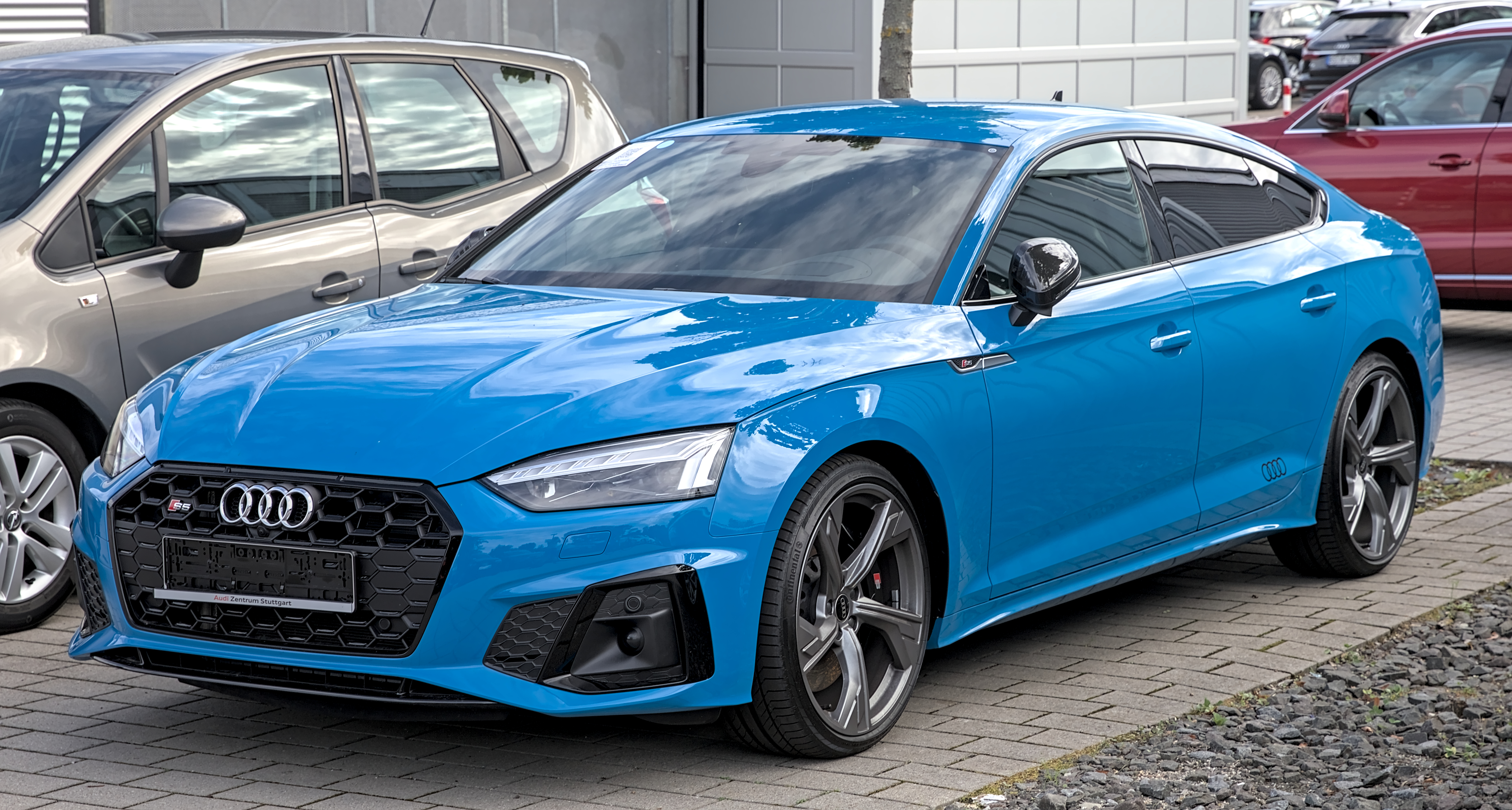
Sportback (facelift)

== S5 B10 (2024–present) ==
The Audi S5 B10 is based on the Audi A5 B10.

In its review of the 2026 sedan variant, The Wall Street Journal detailed some key cost-cutting measures, such as simplified surfaces, reuse of platform and parts with the Audi A5 and Volkswagen Golf R, lack of physical switches on the driver-side door panel, and the use of interior parts from mass-market models.

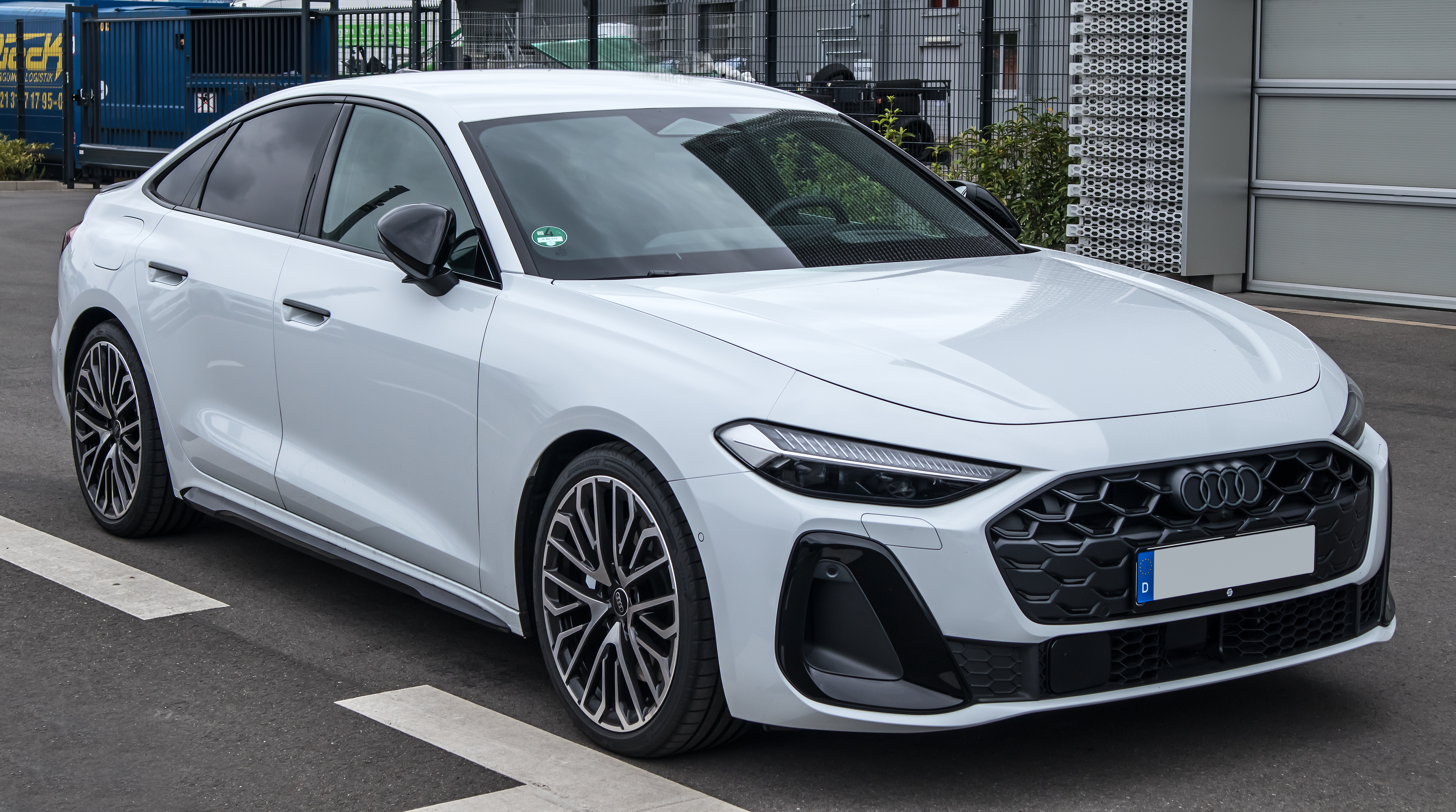
Sedan

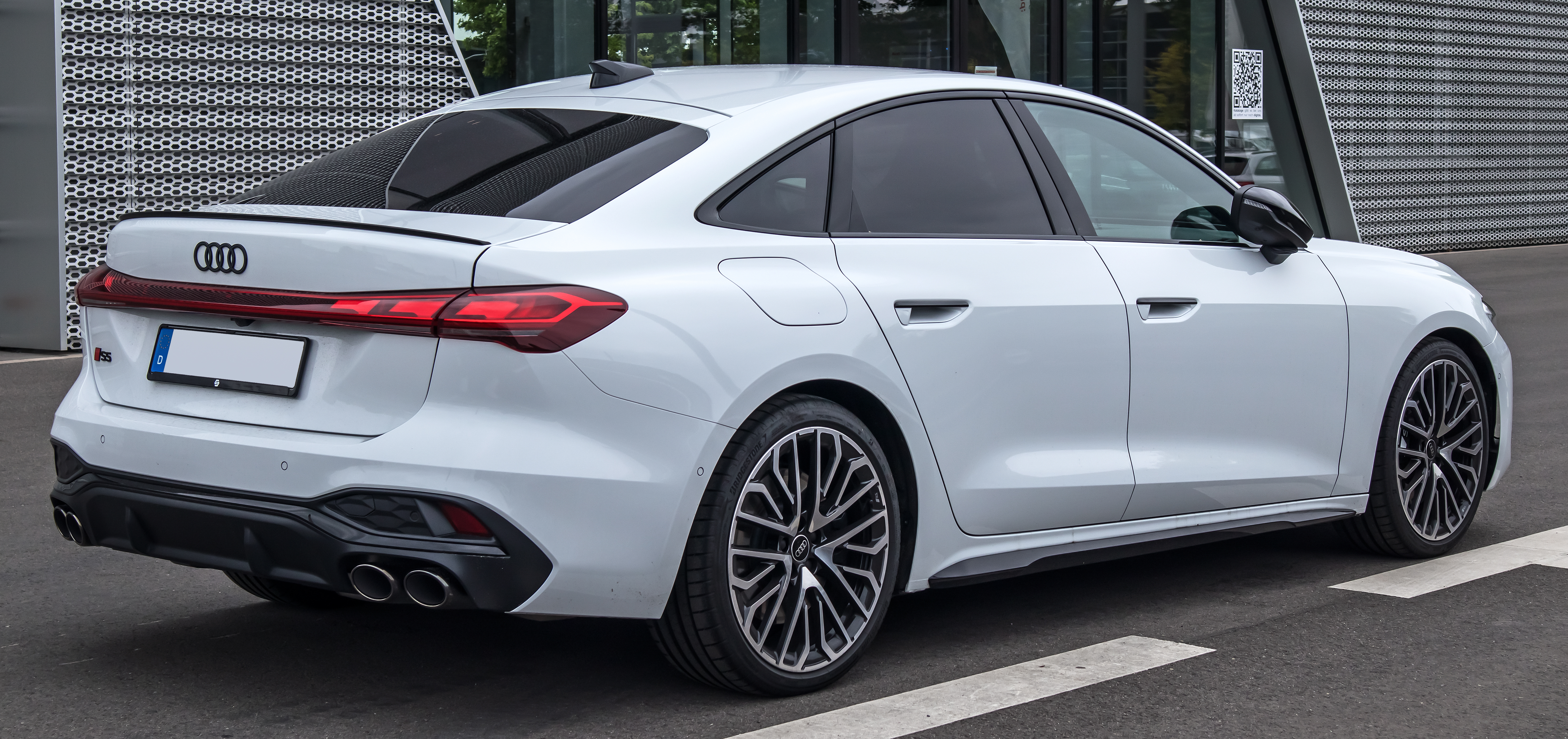
Sedan

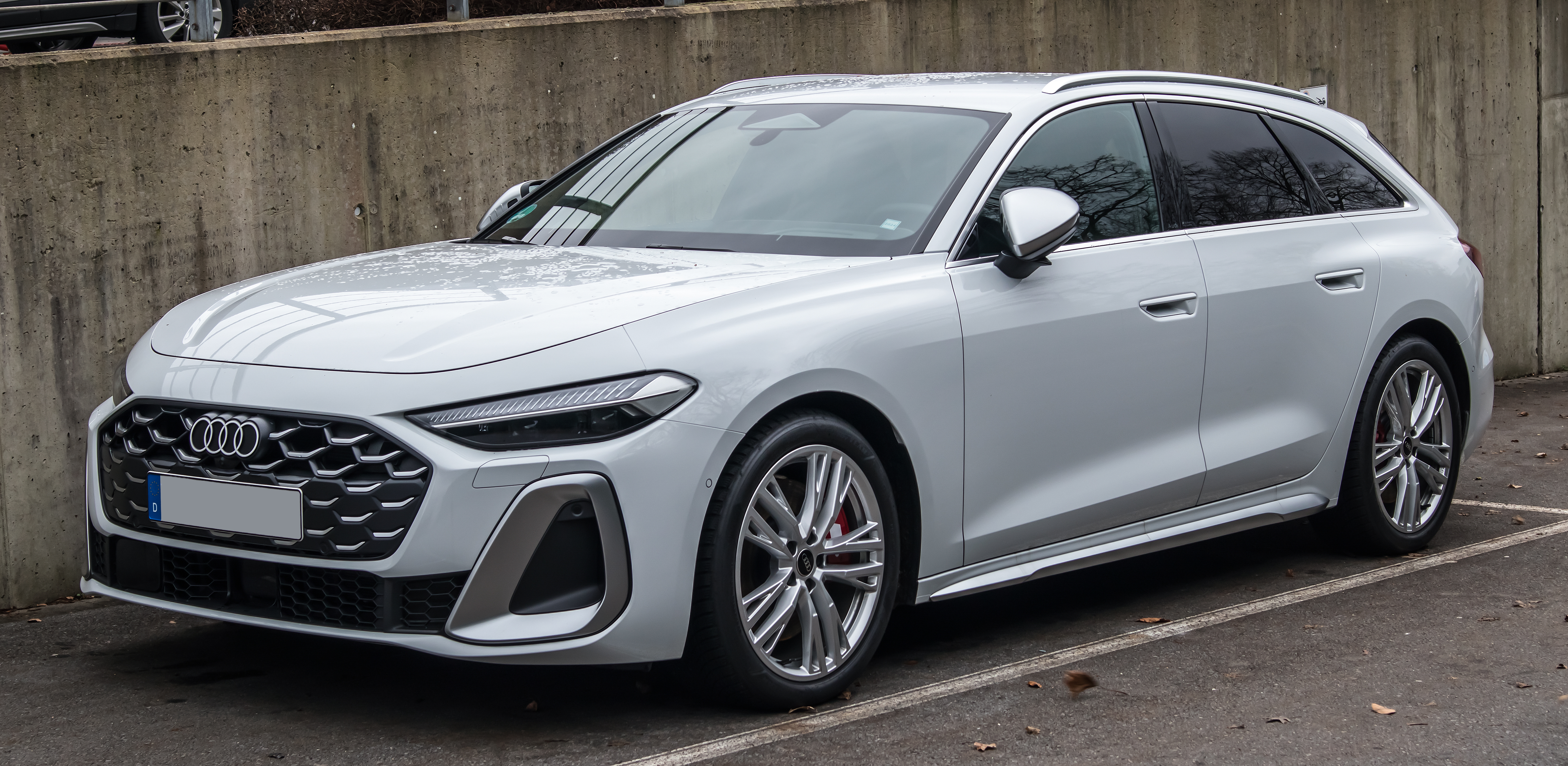
Avant

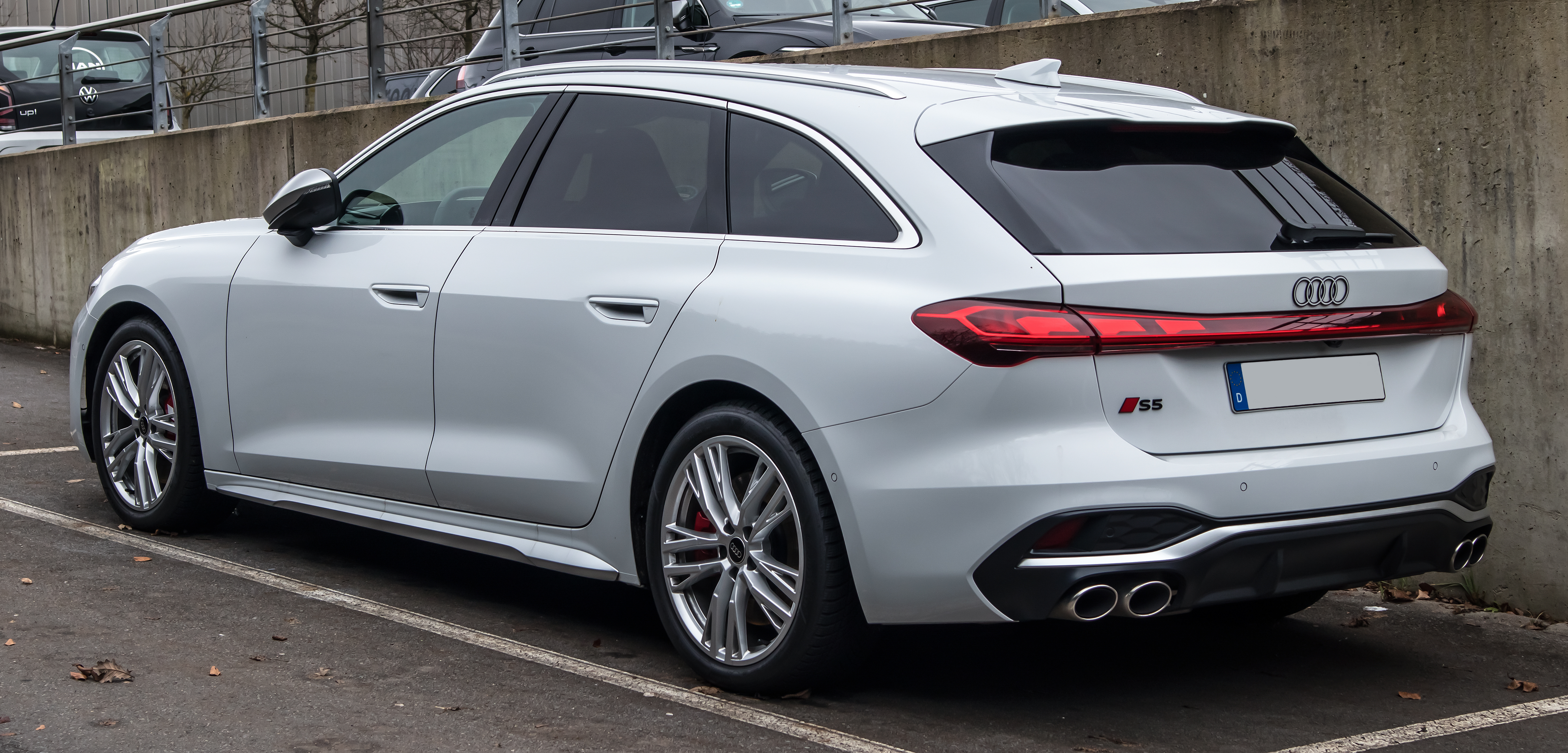
Avant

== Engines ==
Model	Years	Body style	Type/code	Power	Torque
S5 4.2 FSI	2007–2012	Coupé	4,163 cc (254.0 cu in) V8 (CAUA)	260 kW (349 hp) at 6,800 rpm	440 N⋅m (325 lbf⋅ft) at 3,500 rpm
S5 3.0 TFSI	2009–2016	Cabriolet, Sportback	2,995 cc (182.8 cu in) V6 supercharged (CAKA, CCBA)	245 kW (329 hp) at 5,500–7,000 rpm	440 N⋅m (325 lbf⋅ft) at 2,900–5,300 rpm
S5 3.0 TFSI	2013–2017	Coupé	2,995 cc (182.8 cu in) V6 supercharged (CAKA, CCBA)	245 kW (329 hp) at 5,500–7,000 rpm	440 N⋅m (325 lbf⋅ft) at 2,900–5,300 rpm
S5 3.0 TFSI	2017–2024	Cabriolet, Coupé, Sportback	2,995 cc (182.8 cu in) V6 twin-scroll turbocharged (CWGD)	260 kW (349 hp) at 5,400–6,400 rpm	500 N⋅m (369 lbf⋅ft) at 1,370–4,500 rpm
S5 3.0 TFSI	2024–present	Sedan, Avant	2,995 cc (182.8 cu in) V6 twin-scroll MHEV turbocharged	270 kW (362 hp) at 5,500–6,300 rpm	550 N⋅m (406 lbf⋅ft) at 1,400–4,000 rpm
