= Firefly (vehicle) =

Battery electric subcompact hatchback

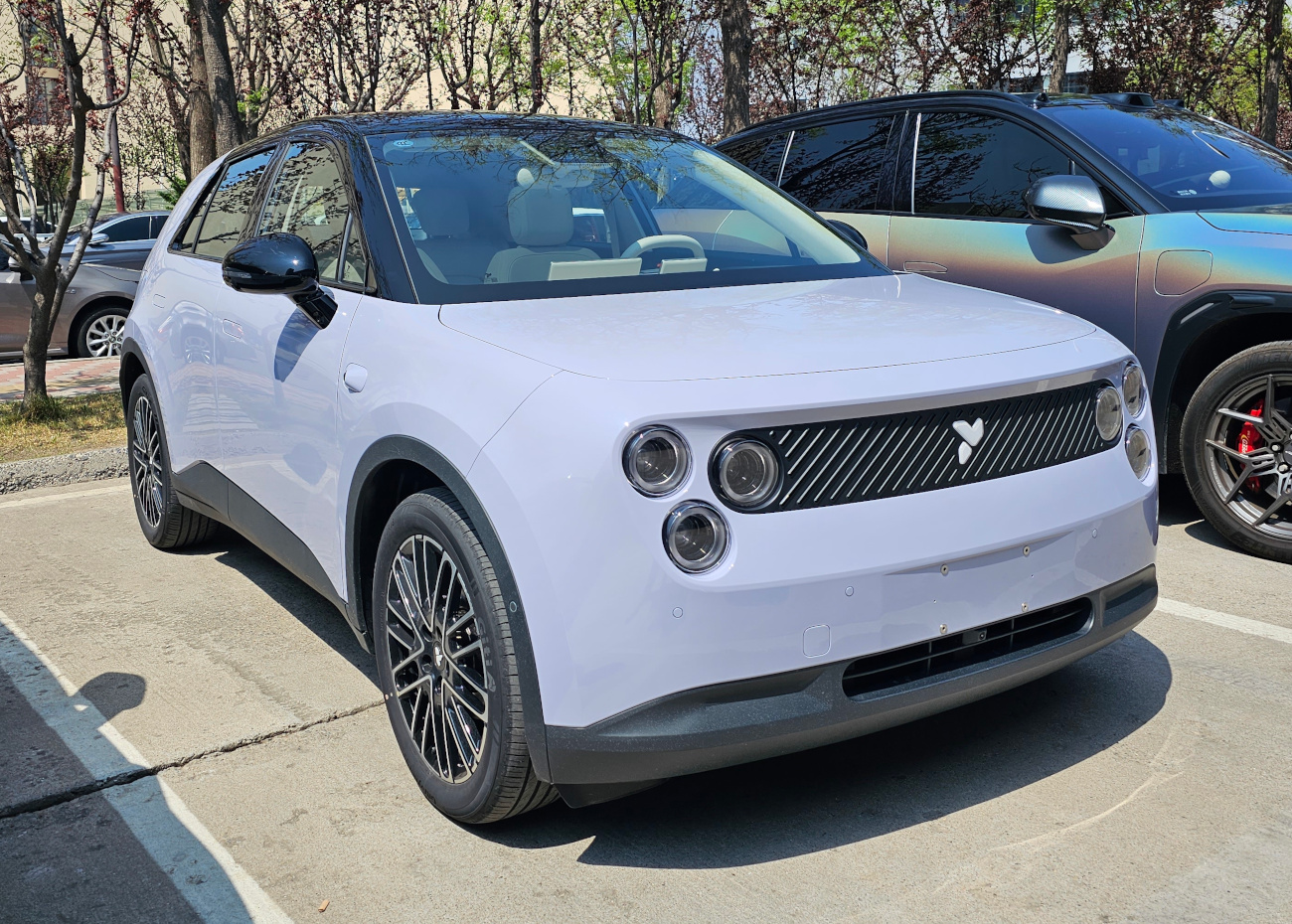

Overview
- Manufacturer: Nio Inc.
- Model code: NAL7000BSEVY1
- Production: 2025–present
- Assembly: China: Hefei, Anhui (Nio F2)
- Designer: Kris Tomasson

Body and chassis
- Class: Supermini (B)
- Body style: 5-door hatchback
- Layout: Rear-motor, rear-wheel-drive
- Platform: NIO FT1

Powertrain
- Electric motor: TZ160S010 permanent magnet synchronous
- Power output: 105–122 kW (141–164 hp; 143–166 PS)
- Battery: 42.1 kWh Sunwoda LFP; 60 kWh CATL NMC Choco-Swap
- Electric range: 330 km (210 mi) (WLTP); 420–560 km (260–350 mi) (CLTC); 400 km (250 mi) (NEDC)
- Plug-in charging: 100 kW (DC)

Dimensions
- Wheelbase: 2,615 mm (103.0 in)
- Length: 4,003 mm (157.6 in)
- Width: 1,781 mm (70.1 in)
- Height: 1,557 mm (61.3 in)
- Kerb weight: 1,492 kg (3,289 lb)

The Firefly (stylised in all lowercase), sometimes referred to as the Firefly EV, is a battery electric supermini car produced by Chinese manufacturer Nio since 2025. It is the first vehicle under the Firefly brand.

== History ==
The Firefly was first revealed on 21 December 2024 at the Firefly brand's launch at the Nio Day 2024 event, where pre-orders for the vehicle opened. Images of the vehicle undergoing cold weather testing, including teasers of the interior, were revealed on 10 January 2025, the same day some additional vehicle specifications were revealed through MIIT regulatory filings.

The Firefly was launched on 19 April 2025 ahead of Auto Shanghai 2025, with deliveries beginning on 29 April. It is available to purchase with the battery-as-a-service model, and launched on 24 June after originally being planned for 1 August 2025 in China.

The Firefly was expected to be launched in European markets between June and August of 2025. The Firefly was originally planned to make its initial debut in Europe, but the introduction of additional tariffs against Chinese battery electric vehicles by the European Union in October 2024 caused Nio to delay the European launch. Production of the right-hand drive version is expected to begin in October 2025.

The Firefly vehicles were originally planned to be incompatible with the existing network of Nio battery swap stations also used by Onvo, instead using its own network of stations. These swap stations are smaller and simpler than Nio stations, and are approximately the size of a shipping container, reducing their international shipping costs and giving them the flexibility to be installed in smaller spaces. At the Firefly launch event in December 2024, the company said that these stations would start being deployed a few months after the vehicle's launch. In March 2025, Nio announced that they were partnering with CATL for its battery swap network, and future Firefly brand models would use CATL's Choco-Swap battery pack standard; the Firefly EV continued to use Nio-Firefly swappable battery standards. At the launch of the Firefly in April 2025, Nio announced that their swap station strategy had changed, and Fireflys would instead use Nio's fifth-generation swap stations, which are expected to become operational starting in early 2026.

== Overview ==
The Firefly is the eponymous brand's debut model, a small five-door hatchback designed for the European market. The vehicle has a length of 4,003 mm (157.6 in) and a wheelbase of 2,615 mm (103.0 in), and is relatively narrow at 1,781 mm (70.1 in) wide. The vehicle has a front and rear overhang of 680 mm (27 in) and 708 mm (27.9 in) respectively, allowing for an approach angle of 21 degrees and a departure angle of 26 degrees, and it has a turning radius of 4.7 m (15 ft).

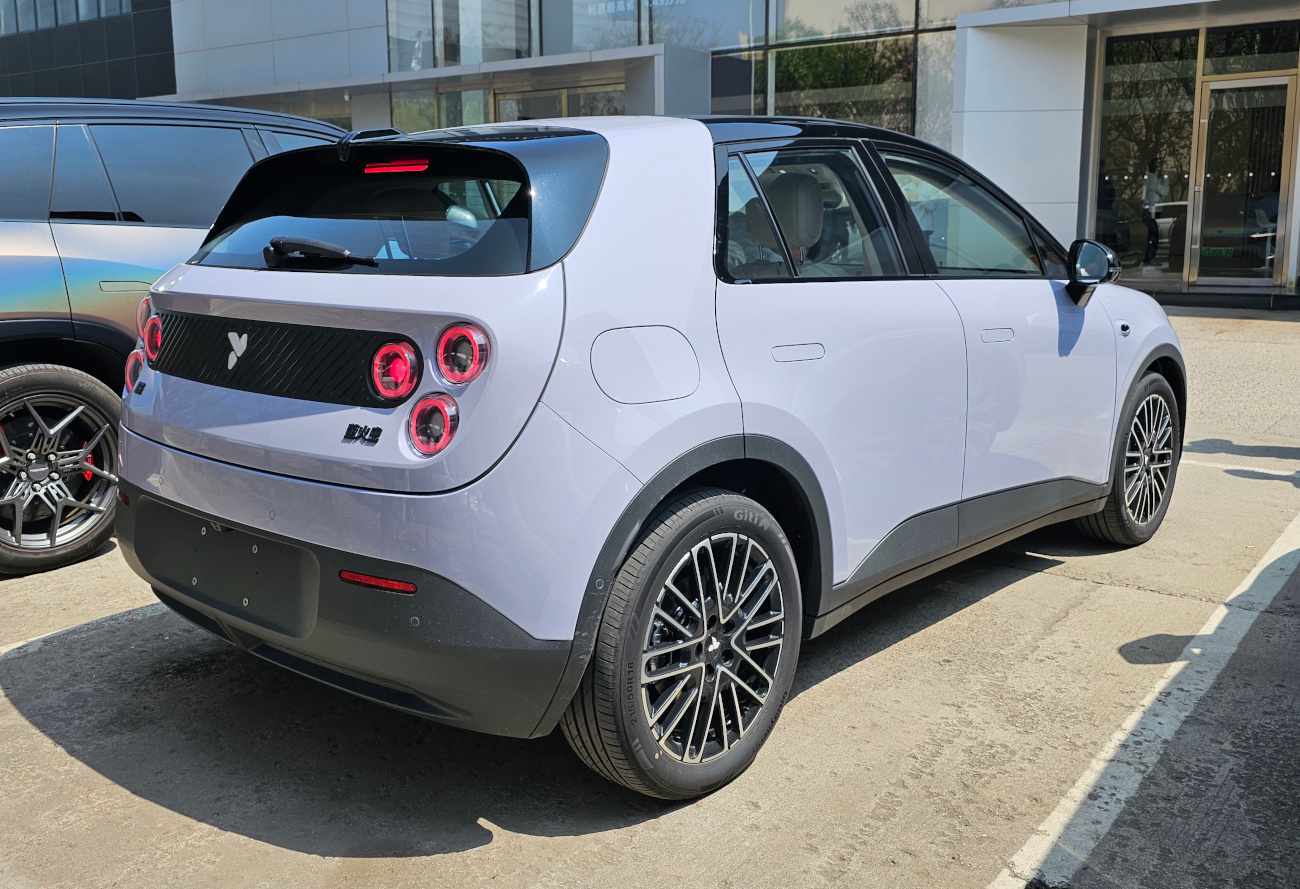
Rear view

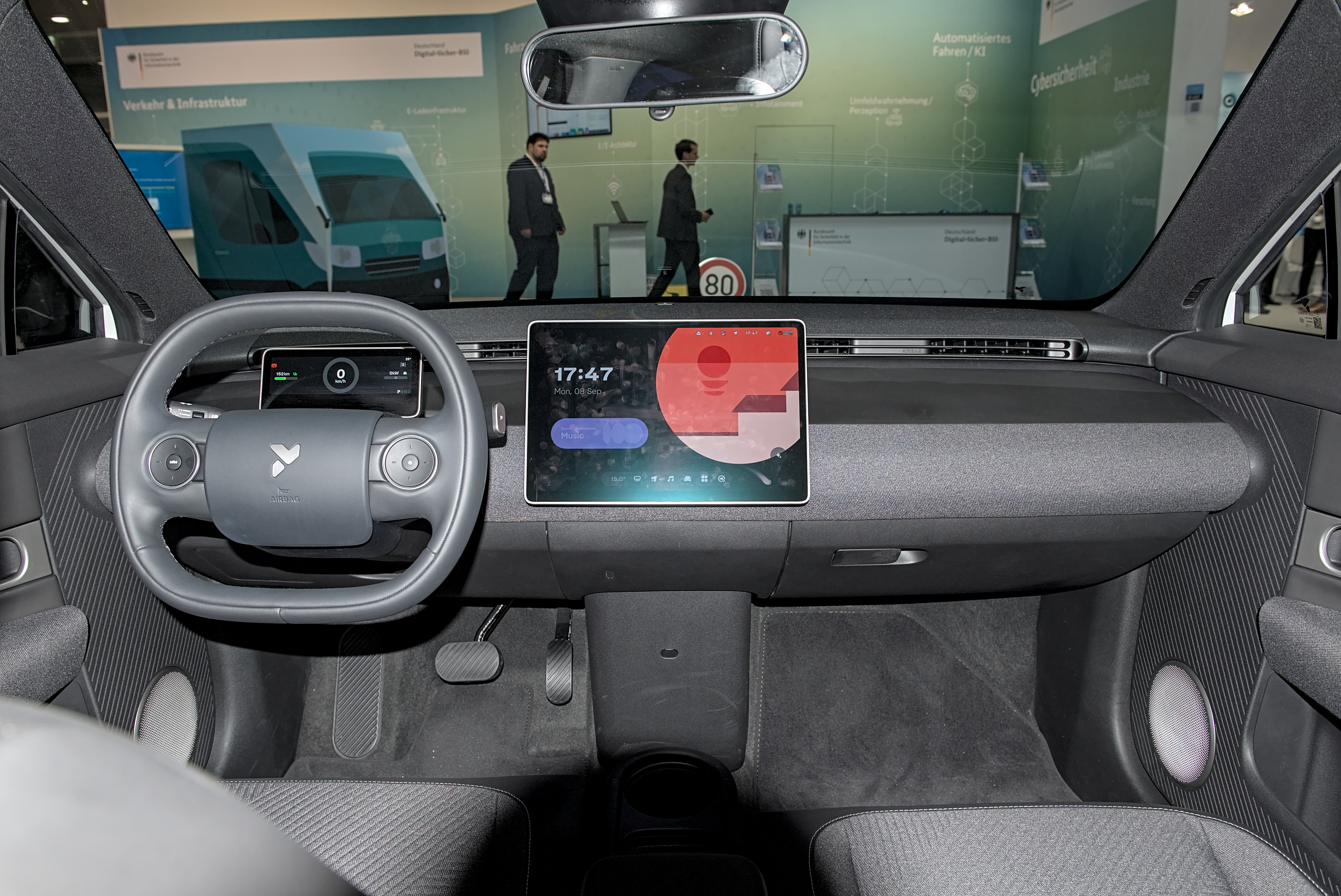
Interior

The Firefly was designed under the lead of Nio design vice president Kris Tomasson. The front of the vehicle's exterior is characterised by headlights which consist of a cluster of three circular rings, connected by a black pill-shaped accent bar, with both shapes acting as design motifs which continue throughout the exterior and interior design. It features a black-painted roof, mirrors, and pillars, with the exception of a body colour 'dynamic loop', a stripe of body colour paint which connects the C-pillars through the roof. The rear features a three-circle cluster for its taillights, which are connected by a black pill-shaped accent bar. The rear cargo hatch is a clamshell design, and features a black painted aerodynamic spoiler and a rear windshield wiper. It is available in six exterior paint colours: lime, lavender, marble, sand, and graphite. It is available with an optional lighting package with upgraded headlights and illuminating logo, and a choice of three 18-inch wheel options.

83.4% of the Firefly EV's chassis is constructed with high-strength steel, allowing for torsional rigidity values of 35,700 Newton-meters per degree. The rear axle uses a five-arm multilink independent suspension co-developed with Multimatic. It has a 50-50 weight distribution, and rides on 18-inch wheels with 215/50 R18 tires, and has a turning radius of 4.7 metres (15 ft). Firefly says that models exported to Europe features a retuned suspension and steering system to suit local market tastes.

The dashboard features a 6-inch digital instrument cluster display mounted on the steering column behind a square-off steering wheel and column shifter, and a 13.2-inch floating infotainment display. The air vents are in a continuous line located at the base of the dashboard and are illuminated by the ambient lighting system. The infotainment system features a Firefly exclusive user interface with a simplified layout features colour theming based on the exterior colour and ambient lighting settings. and features touch gestures for HVAC system and volume adjustment, along with the Lumo voice assistant.

The centre console features a folding armrest revealing a storage bin along with a single cupholder and active cooled wireless charging pad with a drawer underneath, and is disconnected from the dashboard, designed to allow the driver to exit the through the passenger door when parked in tight spaces. Nio says the interior has 27 different storage locations, a 14-speaker 7.1 surround sound system and a fragrance system. It has a panoramic sunroof as standard in China, which is optional in other markets. It also has magnetic mounting points in the front and rear rows for mounting accessories. The door handles, rearview mirror, vanity mirrors, rearview camera mirror, interior lights, speaker grilles, coat hooks, and headrests all feature the pill-shaped design motif.

It has two seat options: one upholstered in microfiber and contrasting leatherette with a heating function; the other is 10-way adjustable and is upholstered in leatherette only with three-hole cluster perforations for its ventilation functions, along with a massaging function for the front row. The dashboard is upholstered in microfiber, and the doors and armrests are upholstered in leatherette. The interior is available in four colours: travertine, pine, plum, and obsidian.

The Firefly EV has a 92-litre (3.2 cu ft) frunk, and the rear cargo volume is 335 litres (12 cu ft) or 400 litres (14 cu ft) when measured to the ceiling, and over 1,253 litres (44 cu ft) with the rear seats folded down. Additionally, there is a 29-litre (1.0 cu ft) storage space underneath the rear passenger seat, and a 29-litre (1.0 cu ft) storage space underneath the passenger seat on models without seat ventilation.

== Markets ==
The Firefly first went on sale in China on 29 April 2025. Nio CEO William Li said that Firefly will enter 16 new markets across five continents in 2025, along with countries Nio already has a direct sales presence including Germany, Norway, Sweden, Denmark, the Netherlands, and UAE. It is sold by third party dealers in new markets, including Belgium, Luxembourg, Austria, Hungary, Portugal, Czech Republic, Romania and Norway in Europe, Macau and Singapore in Asia, Costa Rica, Uruguay and Colombia in Latin America. It is due to launch in New Zealand, Australia and the UK sometime in 2026.

== Safety ==
The Firefly achieved a five-star safety rating in 2024 C-NCAP testing, and is equipped with nine airbags along with ADAS systems. The ADAS system is powered by a Horizon Robotics Journey 5 SoC capable of 128 TOPS, and is capable of supervised autonomous driving on highways and other limited-access roads along with fully automated parking.

Euro NCAP test results Firefly (LHD) (2025)
Test	Points	%
Overall:	5 /5 stars	
Adult occupant:	38.8	96%
Child occupant:	42.9	87%
Pedestrian:	51.7	82%
Safety assist:	15.6	86%

C-NCAP (2024) test results 2025 firefly Luminous
Category		%
Overall:	5 /5 stars	89.5%
Occupant protection:		94.56%
Vulnerable road users:		79.44%
Active safety:		88.56%

== Powertrain ==
The vehicle is powered by a single Nio XPT-manufactured 105 kW (141 hp; 143 PS) rear motor outputting 200 N⋅m (148 lb⋅ft) of torque, and power is supplied from a 42.1 kWh swappable LFP battery pack made by Sunwoda, capable of 420 km (261 mi) on the CLTC cycle. It has a peak DC charge rate of 100 kW and can recharge from 10–80% in 29 minutes. The vehicle has a 0–100 km/h (62 mph) time of 8.2 seconds, and a top speed of 150 km/h (93 mph).

== Sales ==
After deliveries began on 29 April, 231 units were sold in April and 3,680 units were sold in May.

Sales	China
2025	38,043
