= Car and Driver 10Best =

Annual car list

Car and Driver 10Best is a list produced annually by Car and Driver magazine (C/D) beginning in 1983, nominating what its writers considers the 10 best cars of the year. C/D also produced the 5Best list, highlighting what it considers the five best trucks of the year.

All production vehicles for sale in that calendar year are considered with these recent restrictions:

1. The vehicle must be on sale by January
2. It must be priced below 2.5 times the average price of a car that year
3. The manufacturer must provide an example for testing
4. Only substantially changed or new vehicles and the past year's 10 best winners are nominated

The magazine sometimes selects a specific trim and other times a whole family of vehicles.

== Top Models ==
From the start of the 10Best in 1983 through 2023, the following models were represented on the 10Best lists the most years.

Rank	Model	Number of wins
1	Honda Accord	40
2	Chevrolet Corvette	25
2	Porsche Boxster / Cayman	25
4	BMW 3-Series / M3	23
5	Volkswagen GTI / Golf	19
5	Mazda MX-5 Miata	19
7	Ford Mustang	11
8	Audi 5000 and Audi A6 / A7	10
8	Honda Prelude	10
8	Cadillac CTS and Cadillac CT5	11
11	Honda Civic	10
12	Acura Integra and Acura RSX	8
12	Mazda RX-7 and Mazda RX-8	8
12	Nissan 300ZX and Nissan 350Z	8
15	Ford Focus	7
15	Ford Taurus	7
15	Honda Fit	7
15	Honda Odyssey	7
15	Mazda 3	7
15	Porsche Macan	7
21	BMW 5-Series	6
21	Honda Pilot	6
21	Audi A4 / S4	6
21	Ram 1500	6
21	Chrysler LH (300M, Concorde, Intrepid, Vision)	6
26	Toyota Celica Supra / Toyota GR Supra	5
26	Mercedes-Benz GL450 / GLS450	5
26	Chevrolet Silverado	5

== 1983 ==
For the 1980s, Car and Driver picked four domestic and six import cars.

Model	Times on List
AMC Alliance	1
Chevrolet Caprice Classic	1
Ford Mustang GT 5.0	12
Honda Accord	36
Mazda RX-7	8
Mercedes-Benz 380SEL	1
Pontiac 6000 STE	3
Porsche 944	4
Renault Alliance	1
Toyota Supra Celica Supra	5
Volkswagen GTI Rabbit	16

Fastest car tested: Jaguar XJ-S HE, 142 mph

Top-selling cars:

1. Oldsmobile Cutlass Supreme
2. Ford Escort
3. Ford LTD

== 1984 ==
Instituted the price cap at $30,000.

Model	Times on List
Audi 5000 S/Turbo	5
Dodge Daytona Turbo	1
Honda Prelude	10
Honda Accord	36
Mazda 626	4
Pontiac Fiero 2M4	1
Pontiac 6000 STE	3
Porsche 944	4
Toyota Supra Celica Supra	5
Volkswagen GTI Rabbit	16

Fastest car tested: Ferrari 308 Quattrovalvole, 144 mph

Top-selling cars:

1. Chevrolet Cavalier
2. Ford Escort
3. Ford LTD

== 1985 ==
Price cap: $30,000

Model	Times on List
Audi 5000 S/Turbo	5
Chevrolet Camaro IROC-Z	4
Chevrolet Corvette	21
Dodge Caravan	3
Honda CRX	2
Honda Civic	8
Honda Prelude	10
Honda Accord	36
Merkur XR4Ti	1
Plymouth Voyager	3
Pontiac 6000 STE	3
Porsche 944	4

Fastest car tested: Chevrolet Corvette, 150 mph

Top-selling cars:

1. Chevrolet Cavalier
2. Ford Escort
3. Chevrolet Celebrity

== 1986 ==
Price cap: $30,000

Model	Times on List
Audi 5000 CS Turbo Quattro	5
Chevrolet Corvette	21
Ford Taurus	7
Honda Prelude	10
Honda Accord	36
Lincoln Mark VII LSC	1
Mercury Sable	3
Porsche 944 Turbo	4
Saab 9000 Turbo	4
Toyota MR2	2
Volkswagen GTI	16

Fastest car tested: Porsche 944 Turbo, 157 mph

Top-selling cars:

1. Chevrolet Celebrity
2. Ford Escort
3. Chevrolet Cavalier

== 1987 ==
Price cap: $30,000

Model	Times on List
Acura Integra	6
Audi 5000 CS Turbo	5
Chevrolet Corvette	21
Ford Mustang GT	12
Ford Taurus	7
Honda Accord	36
Mazda RX-7 Turbo	8
Pontiac Bonneville SE	1
Saab 9000 Turbo	4
Toyota MR2	2

Fastest car tested: Ferrari Testarossa, 176 mph

Top-selling cars:

1. Ford Escort
2. Ford Taurus
3. Chevrolet Cavalier

== 1988 ==
Price cap: $35,000

Model	Times on List
Acura Legend Coupe	3
Acura Integra	6
Audi 5000	5
Chevrolet Corvette	21
Ford Mustang 5.0	12
Ford Taurus	7
Honda CRX	2
Honda Civic	8
Honda Accord	36
Saab 9000 Turbo	4

Fastest car tested: Ferrari Testarossa, 173 mph

Top-selling cars:

1. Ford Escort
2. Chevrolet Corsica/Beretta
3. Ford Taurus

== 1989 ==
Imports and domestics chosen by marque, not by place of manufacture.

Price cap: $35,000

Model	Times on List
Acura Legend Coupe	3
Chevrolet Corvette	21
Dodge Colt Turbo	1
Ford Probe GT	3
Ford Taurus	7
Honda Civic	8
Honda Accord	36
Lincoln Continental	1
Mitsubishi Mirage Turbo	1
Mitsubishi Eclipse Turbo	4
Plymouth Laser Turbo	4
Saab 9000 Turbo	4

Fastest car tested: 750iL V12, 158 mph

Top-selling cars:

1. Honda Accord
2. Ford Taurus
3. Ford Escort

== 1990 ==
Eliminated half domestic/half import rule as impractical.

Price cap: $35,000

Model	Times on List
Acura Legend Coupe	3
Eagle Talon Turbo	3
Ford Taurus	7
Honda Civic	8
Honda Accord	36
Lexus LS	1
Mazda MPV	2
Mazda MX-5 Miata	18
Mercury Sable	3
Mitsubishi Eclipse Turbo	4
Nissan Maxima SE	3
Nissan 300ZX Turbo	7
Plymouth Laser Turbo	4

Fastest car tested: Chevrolet Corvette ZR-1, 175 mph

Top-selling cars:

1. Honda Accord
2. Ford Taurus
3. Chevrolet Cavalier

== 1991 ==
New rule: No more than two places per marque.

Price cap: $35,000

Model	Times on List
Eagle Talon Turbo	3
Ford Taurus	7
Honda Civic	8
Honda Accord	36
Mazda MPV V6	2
Mazda MX-5 Miata	18
Mercury Tracer LTS	1
Mercury Sable	3
Mitsubishi Eclipse Turbo	4
Nissan Sentra SE-R	4
Nissan 300ZX Turbo	7
Plymouth Laser Turbo	4
Toyota Previa	1

Fastest car tested: Chevrolet Corvette ZR-1, 176 mph

Top-selling cars:

1. Honda Accord
2. Ford Taurus
3. Toyota Camry

== 1992 ==
Price cap: $40,000

Model	Times on List
BMW 3 Series 325i	23
Cadillac Seville Touring Sedan	1
Eagle Talon AWD Turbo	3
Ford Taurus SHO	7
Honda Prelude Si	10
Lexus SC SC400	4
Mazda MX-5 Miata	18
Mitsubishi Eclipse AWD Turbo	4
Nissan Sentra SE-R	4
Nissan 300ZX Turbo	7
Plymouth Laser AWD Turbo	4
Toyota Camry V6	3

Fastest car tested: Ferrari F40, 197 mph

Top-selling cars:

1. Ford Taurus
2. Honda Accord
3. Toyota Camry

== 1993 ==
Price cap: $40,000

Model	Times on List
BMW 3 Series 325i	23
Chrysler Concorde	2
Dodge Intrepid	4
Eagle Vision	2
Ford Probe GT	3
Honda Prelude Si VTEC	10
Jeep Grand Cherokee V8	1
Lexus SC	4
Mazda RX-7	8
Nissan Sentra SE-R	4
Nissan 300ZX Turbo	7
Toyota Camry Sedans	3

Fastest car tested: Lamborghini Diablo, 204 mph

Top-selling cars:

1. Ford Taurus
2. Honda Accord
3. Toyota Camry

== 1994 ==
Institution of the 2.5x price cap, now at $43,000.

Model	Times on List
Acura Integra GS-R	6
BMW 3 Series 325i/325is	23
Chrysler Concorde	2
Dodge Intrepid	4
Eagle Vision	2
Ford Probe GT	3
Honda Prelude VTEC	10
Honda Accord EX	36
Lexus SC	4
Mazda RX-7	8
Nissan Sentra SE-R	4
Nissan 300ZX Turbo	7

Fastest car tested: Chevrolet Corvette ZR-1, 179 mph

Top-selling cars:

1. Ford Taurus
2. Honda Accord
3. Ford Escort

== 1995 ==
Price cap: $46,000.

Model	Times on List
Acura Integra GS-R	6
BMW 3 Series 328i/M3	23
Chrysler Cirrus LXi	3
Ford Contour	3
Honda Prelude VTEC	10
Honda Accord	36
Lexus SC	4
Mazda RX-7	8
Mercury Mystique	3
Nissan Maxima SE	3
Nissan 300ZX Turbo	7

Fastest car tested: Lamborghini Diablo VT, 185 mph

Top-selling cars:

1. Ford Taurus
2. Honda Accord
3. Toyota Camry

== 1996 ==
Price cap: $48,000

Model	Times on List
Acura Integra	6
Audi A4	6
BMW 3 Series 328i/M3	23
Chrysler Town and Country	2
Chrysler Cirrus	3
Dodge Stratus	2
Dodge Caravan	3
Ford Contour	3
Honda Civic	8
Honda Prelude VTEC	10
Mercury Mystique	3
Nissan Maxima SE	3
Nissan 300ZX Turbo	7
Plymouth Voyager	3

Fastest car tested: Ferrari F355, 179 mph

Top-selling cars:

1. Ford Taurus
2. Honda Accord
3. Toyota Camry

== 1997 ==
Price cap: $54,000

Model	Times on List
Acura Integra	6
Audi A4	6
BMW 5 Series	6
BMW 3 Series 328i/M3	23
Chrysler Town and Country	2
Chrysler Cirrus	3
Dodge Stratus	2
Dodge Caravan	3
Ford Contour	3
Honda Prelude SH	10
Mercedes-Benz SLK-Class (R170)	2
Mercury Mystique	3
Plymouth Breeze	1
Plymouth Voyager	3
Toyota Camry V6	3

Fastest car tested: Dodge Viper GTS, 177 mph

Top-selling cars:

1. Toyota Camry
2. Honda Accord
3. Ford Taurus

== 1998 ==
Price cap: $55,000

Model	Times on List
Audi A4	6
BMW 5 Series	6
BMW 3 Series 328i/M3	23
Chevrolet Corvette	21
Dodge Intrepid	4
Honda Prelude	10
Honda Accord	36
Lexus GS	3
Mazda MX-5 Miata	18
Porsche Boxster	20

Fastest car tested: Ferrari F50, 194 mph

Top-selling cars:

1. Toyota Camry
2. Honda Accord
3. Ford Taurus

== 1999 ==
Price cap: $59,000

Model	Times on List
BMW M Coupe / M Roadster	1
BMW 5-Series	6
BMW 328i / M3	23
Chevrolet Corvette	21
Chrysler 300M	2
Dodge Intrepid	4
Honda Accord	36
Lexus GS	3
Mazda MX-5 Miata	18
Porsche Boxster	20

Top-selling cars:

1. Toyota Camry
2. Honda Accord
3. Ford Taurus

== 2000 ==
Price cap: $61,000

Model	Times on List
Audi A6 2.7T / 4.2	5
Audi TT	2
BMW 5 Series	6
BMW 3 Series	23
Chrysler 300M	2
Ford Focus	7
Honda Accord	36
Honda S2000	4
Lexus GS300/GS400	3
Porsche Boxster	20

Top-selling cars:

1. Toyota Camry
2. Honda Accord
3. Ford Taurus

== 2001 ==
For 2001, Car and Driver created a separate "5Best Trucks" award with a single winner in each of five categories.

Top-selling vehicles:

1. Ford F-Series
2. Chevrolet Silverado
3. Ford Explorer

=== 10Best Cars ===
Price cap: $62,000

Model	Times on List
Audi A6 2.7T / 4.2	5
Audi TT	2
BMW 5-Series	6
BMW 3-Series	23
Chrysler PT Cruiser	1
Ford Focus	7
Honda Accord	36
Honda S2000	4
Mazda MX-5 Miata	18
Porsche Boxster	20

=== 5Best Trucks ===
Title	Model	Times on List
Large SUV	Toyota Highlander	1
Luxury SUV	Acura MDX	1
Pickup Truck	Chevrolet Silverado	5
Small SUV	Ford Escape	1
Van	Honda Odyssey	7

== 2002 ==
Top-selling cars:

1. Ford F-Series
2. Chevrolet Silverado
3. Toyota Camry

=== 10Best Cars ===
Price cap: $66,000

Model	Times on List
Acura RSX	2
Audi A4	6
BMW 3 Series M3	23
BMW 5 Series	6
Chevrolet Corvette	21
Ford Focus	7
Honda Accord	36
Honda S2000	4
Porsche Boxster	20
Subaru Impreza WRX	2

=== 5Best Trucks ===
Title	Model	Times on List
Large SUV	Honda Pilot	6
Luxury SUV	Land Rover Range Rover	1
Pickup Truck	Chevrolet Silverado	5
Small SUV	Honda CR-V	2
Van	Honda Odyssey	7

== 2003 ==
=== 10Best Cars ===
Price cap: $66,000

Model	Times on List
Acura RSX	2
BMW 3 Series M3	23
Chevrolet Corvette	21
Ford Focus	7
Honda Accord	36
Infiniti G35	4
Mazda 6 s	4
Nissan 350Z	1
Porsche Boxster	20
Subaru Impreza WRX	2

=== 5Best Trucks ===
Title	Model	Times on List
Large SUV	Honda Pilot	6
Luxury SUV	Volkswagen Touareg	1
Pickup Truck	Chevrolet Silverado	5
Small SUV	Honda CR-V	2
Van	Honda Odyssey	7

== 2004 ==
=== 10Best Cars ===
Price cap: $69,000

Model	Times on List
Acura TSX	3
Audi S4	6
BMW 3 Series / M3	23
Chevrolet Corvette	21
Ford Focus	7
Honda Accord	36
Honda S2000	4
Infiniti G35	4
Mazda RX-8	3
Toyota Prius	1

=== 5Best Trucks ===
Title	Model	Times on List
Large SUV	Honda Pilot	6
Luxury SUV	Cadillac SRX	3
Pickup Truck	Ford F-Series	3
Small SUV	Subaru Forester	3
Van	Toyota Sienna	1

== 2005 ==
=== 10Best Cars ===
Price cap: $70,000

For 2005 and 2006, the magazine named one winner in each category.

Title	Model	Times on List
Family Sedan	Honda Accord	36
Full Size Sedan	Chrysler 300C	3
Luxury Sedan	Acura RL	1
Luxury Sports Car	Mercedes-Benz SLK	2
Luxury Sports Sedan	BMW 3 Series M3	23
Muscle Car	Ford Mustang GT	12
Performance Car	Chevrolet Corvette	21
Sports Coupe	Mazda RX-8	3
Sports Sedan	Acura TSX	3
Wagon	Dodge Magnum	1

=== 5Best Trucks ===
Title	Model	Times on List
Large SUV	Honda Pilot	6
Luxury SUV	Cadillac SRX	3
Pickup Truck	Ford F-Series	3
Small SUV	Subaru Forester	3
Van	Honda Odyssey	7

== 2006 ==
=== 10Best Cars ===
Price cap: $70,000

Model	Times on List
Acura TSX	3
Audi A3 2.0T	1
BMW 3 Series	23
Chevrolet Corvette	21
Chrysler 300 / 300C	3
Mustang GT	12
Honda Accord	36
Mazda MX-5 Miata	18
Mazda RX-8	3
Porsche Boxster / Cayman	21

=== 5Best Trucks ===
Title	Model	Times on List
Large SUV	Honda Pilot	6
Luxury SUV	Cadillac SRX	3
Pickup Truck	Ford F-Series	3
Small SUV	Subaru Forester	3
Van	Honda Odyssey	7

== 2007 ==
=== 10Best Cars ===
Price cap: $71,000

Model	Times on List
BMW 3 Series	23
Chevrolet Corvette	21
Chrysler 300C	3
Honda Accord	36
Honda Fit	7
Infiniti G35 Sedan	4
Mazdaspeed3	7
Mazda MX-5 Miata	18
Porsche Boxster / Cayman	21
Volkswagen GTI	16

=== 5Best Trucks ===
Title	Model	Times on List
Large SUV	Honda Pilot	6
Luxury SUV	Mercedes-Benz GL-Class GL450	2
Pickup Truck	Chevrolet Silverado	5
Small SUV	Toyota RAV4	2
Van	Honda Odyssey	7

== 2008 ==
=== 10Best Cars ===
Price cap: $72,000

Model	Times on List
BMW 3 Series	23
Cadillac CTS	8
Chevrolet Corvette	21
Chevrolet Malibu	1
Honda Accord	36
Honda Fit	7
Mazda MX-5 Miata	18
Mazdaspeed3	7
Porsche Boxster	20
Porsche Cayman	2
Volkswagen GTI	16

5Best Trucks

Title	Model	Times on List
Large SUV	Mazda CX-9	1
Luxury SUV	Mercedes-Benz GL-Class	2
Pickup Truck	Chevrolet Silverado	5
Small SUV	Toyota RAV4	2
Van	Honda Odyssey	7

== 2009 ==
=== 10Best Cars ===
Price cap: $71,000

Beginning with the 2009 list, Car and Driver considered the Porsche Boxster and Cayman to be the same car.

Model	Times on List
Volkswagen GTI	16
BMW 3 Series	23
Cadillac CTS	8
Chevrolet Corvette	21
Honda Accord	36
Honda Fit	7
Infiniti G37	4
Jaguar XF	1
Mazda MX-5 Miata	18
Porsche Boxster/Cayman	21

=== "Dishonorable Mention" ===
In conjunction with the 2009 10Best Cars list, Car and Driver issued a list of what it called "The 10 Most Embarrassing Award Winners in Automotive History", spotlighting cars previously honored by a major automotive magazine (including CD itself) that, with the passage of time, it considered to be anything but award-worthy.

Year	Model	Award(s)
1983	Renault Alliance	Car and Driver 10Best Cars and Motor Trend Car of the Year
2002	Ford Thunderbird	Motor Trend Car of the Year
1971	Chevrolet Vega	Motor Trend Car of the Year
1997	Cadillac Catera	Automobile All-Stars
1985	Merkur XR4Ti	Car and Driver 10Best Cars
1997	Chevrolet Malibu	Motor Trend Car of the Year
1990	Lincoln Town Car	Motor Trend Car of the Year
1980	Chevrolet Citation	Motor Trend Car of the Year
1974	Ford Mustang II	Motor Trend Car of the Year
1995	Ford Contour/Mercury Mystique	Car and Driver 10Best Cars

== 2010 ==
=== 10Best Cars ===
Price cap: $80,000

Model	Times on List
Audi S4	6
BMW 3 Series	23
Cadillac CTS-V	8
Ford Fusion Hybrid	1
Honda Accord	36
Honda Fit	7
Mazda MX-5 Miata	18
Mazda3	7
Porsche Boxster/Cayman	21
Volkswagen GTI	16

== 2011 ==
=== 10Best Cars ===
Price cap: $80,000 This year marks the first appearance of an electrically powered car, the Volt, as well as the first appearance of a Korean automaker, Hyundai, on C&D 10Best.

Model	Times on List
Volkswagen GTI	16
BMW 3 Series	23
Cadillac CTS-V	8
Chevrolet Volt	1
Honda Accord	36
Honda Fit	7
Ford Mustang	12
Mazda MX-5 Miata	18
Hyundai Sonata	1
Porsche Boxster/Cayman	21

== 2012 ==
=== 10Best Cars ===
Price cap: $80,000

Model	Times on List
Volkswagen Golf / GTI	17
BMW 3 Series / M3	23
Cadillac CTS-V	8
Honda Accord	36
Honda Fit	7
Ford Focus	7
Audi A6 / A7 3.0T quattro	5
Ford Mustang GT / Boss 302	12
Mazda MX-5 Miata	18
Porsche Boxster / Cayman	21

== 2013 ==
=== 10Best Cars ===
Price cap: $80,000

Model	Times on List
Audi A6 3.0T / S6 / A7 3.0T / S7	5
BMW 3 Series	23
Ford Focus/Focus ST	7
Ford Mustang GT/Boss 302	12
Honda Accord	36
Honda Fit	7
Mazda MX-5 Miata	18
Porsche Boxster/Boxster S	20
Scion FR-S / Subaru BRZ	1
Volkswagen Golf / GTI	17

== 2014 ==
=== 10Best Cars ===
Price cap: $80,000

Model	Times on List
Audi A6 / S6 / A7	5
BMW 3-Series / 4-Series	23
Cadillac CTS / CTS V-Sport	8
Chevrolet Corvette Stingray	21
Ford Fiesta ST	1
Honda Accord	36
Mazda 3	7
Mazda 6	4
Porsche Boxster / Cayman	21
Volkswagen Golf / GTI	17

== 2015 ==
=== 10Best Cars ===
Price cap: $80,000

Model	Times on List
BMW M235i	4
Cadillac CTS	8
Chevrolet Corvette Stingray	21
Ford Mustang GT	12
Honda Accord	36
Mazda 3	7
Mazda 6	4
Porsche Boxster/Cayman	21
Tesla Model S 60	2
Volkswagen Golf/GTI	17

== 2016 ==
=== 10Best Cars ===
Price cap: $80,000

Model	Times on List
BMW M235i	4
Cadillac CTS V-Sport	8
Chevrolet Camaro	4
Ford Mustang Shelby GT350 / GT350R	12
Honda Accord	36
Mazda 3	7
Mazda MX-5 Miata	18
Porsche Boxster / Cayman	21
Tesla Model S 70 / 70D	2
Volkswagen Golf / Golf GTI / Golf R	17

== 2017 ==
=== 10Best Cars ===
Model	Times on List
BMW M240i / M2	4
Chevrolet Bolt EV	1
Chevrolet Camaro V6 / SS	4
Chevrolet Corvette Grand Sport	21
Ford Mustang Shelby GT350 / GT350R	12
Honda Accord	36
Mazda MX-5 Miata	18
Mazda3	7
Porsche 718 Boxster / Cayman	21
Volkswagen Golf / GTI / R / Alltrack	17

=== 10Best Trucks and SUVs ===
Model	Times on List
Kia Soul	1
BMW X1	1
Honda CR-V	1
Porsche Macan	1
Mazda CX-9	1
Audi Q7	1
Mercedes-Benz GLS450	1
Honda Ridgeline	1
Ford F-150 / F-150 Raptor	1
Chrysler Pacifica	1

== 2018 ==
=== 10Best Cars ===
Model	Times on List
Audi RS 3	1
Alfa Romeo Giulia / Giulia Quadrifoglio	1
Chevrolet Camaro V6 / SS / ZL1 (1LE Coupes)	4
Chevrolet Corvette Grand Sport	21
Honda Accord	36
Honda Civic 1.5T Sport / Si / Type R	8
Mazda MX-5 Miata / Miata RF	18
Mercedes-Benz E400 / E43 AMG	2
Porsche 718 Boxster / Cayman	21
Volkswagen Golf / GTI / R / e-Golf / Alltrack / Sportwagen	17

=== 10Best Trucks and SUVs ===
Model	Times on List
Kia Soul	2
BMW X1	2
Mazda CX-5	1
Porsche Macan	2
Mazda CX-9	2
Audi Q7	2
Mercedes-Benz GLS450	2
Honda Ridgeline	2
Ford F-150 / F-150 Raptor	2
Chrysler Pacifica	1

== 2019 ==
=== 10Best Cars ===
$90,000 base-price cap

Model	Times on List
BMW M2 Competition	4
Chevrolet Corvette Grand Sport / Z06	21
Ford Mustang GT / Bullitt	12
Genesis G70	1
Honda Accord	36
Honda Civic Sport Hatchback / Si / Type R	8
Mazda MX-5 Miata / Miata RF	18
Mercedes-Benz E450 / E53 AMG	2
Porsche 718 Boxster / Cayman	21
Volkswagen Golf family	17

=== 10Best Trucks and SUVs ===
Model	Times on List
Hyundai Kona	1
BMW X1	3
Mazda CX-5	2
Porsche Macan	3
Mazda CX-9	3
Audi Q7	3
Mercedes-Benz GLS450	3
Honda Ridgeline	3
Ram 1500	1
Chrysler Pacifica	2

== 2020 ==
=== 10Best Cars and Trucks ===
Beginning with the 2020 list, SUVs and trucks are no longer separate

Model	Times on List
Chevrolet Corvette Stingray	21
Honda Accord	36
Jeep Gladiator	1
Kia Telluride	1
Mazda CX-5	3
Porsche 718 Boxster / Cayman	21
Porsche Macan (S / Turbo)	4
Ram 1500	2
Toyota GR Supra	3
Volkswagen Golf GTI / Jetta GLI	17, 1

== 2021 ==
=== 10Best Cars and Trucks ===
The 2021 10Best list was released on November 18, 2020. Every car from the 2020 list returns, with the exception of the Jeep Gladiator. The Genesis GV80 makes its first appearance on the list.

Model	Times on List
Chevrolet Corvette Stingray	22
Genesis GV80	1
Honda Accord	36
Kia Telluride	2
Mazda CX-5	4
Porsche 718 Boxster / Cayman	22
Porsche Macan (S / GTS / Turbo)	5
Ram 1500 / Ram TRX	3
Toyota GR Supra	4
Volkswagen Golf GTI / Jetta GLI	18, 2

== 2022 ==
=== 10Best Cars and Trucks ===
The 2022 10Best list was released on November 17, 2021.

Model	Times on List
Cadillac CT4-V Blackwing	1
Cadillac CT5-V Blackwing	1
Chevrolet Corvette Stingray	23
Ford Bronco	1
Honda Accord	36
Kia Telluride	3
Porsche 718 Boxster / Cayman	23
Ram 1500 / Ram TRX	4
Subaru BRZ / Toyota GR86	2
Volkswagen Golf GTI	19

== 2023 ==
=== 10Best Cars ===
The 2023 10Best Cars list was released on December 19, 2022.

Model	Times on List
BMW i4	1
Cadillac CT4-V Blackwing	2
Cadillac CT5-V Blackwing	2
Chevrolet Corvette	24
Honda Accord	37
Honda Civic	3
Porsche 718 Boxster / Cayman	24
Subaru BRZ / Toyota GR86	3
Toyota GR Corolla	1
Toyota GR Supra	5

=== 10Best Trucks and SUVs ===
The 2023 10Best Trucks and SUVs list was released on January 17, 2023. Beginning with the 2023 list, SUVs and trucks are once again separate.

Model	Times on List
Ford Bronco	2
Ford Maverick	1
Genesis GV70	1
Honda CR-V	2
Hyundai Ioniq 5	1
Kia EV6	1
Kia Telluride	4
Porsche Macan	6
Ram 1500 / Ram TRX	5
Rivian R1T	1

== 2024 ==
=== 10Best Cars ===
The 2024 10Best Cars list was released on December 5th, 2023.

Model	Times on List
Acura Integra Type S	1
Cadillac CT4-V Blackwing	3
Cadillac CT5-V Blackwing	3
Chevrolet Corvette	25
Honda Accord	38
Honda Civic	4
Lucid Air Pure	1
Porsche 718 Boxster / Cayman	25
Subaru BRZ / Toyota GR86	4
Toyota Prius	2

=== 10Best Trucks and SUVs ===
The 2024 10Best Trucks and SUVs list was released on December 5th, 2023.

Model	Times on List
Chevrolet Trax	1
Ford Maverick	2
Genesis GV70/Electrified GV70	2
Honda CR-V	3
Hyundai Ioniq 5	2
Kia EV9	1
Kia Telluride	5
Porsche Macan	7
Ram 1500 / Ram TRX	6
Toyota Grand Highlander	1

== 2025 ==
Price cap: $110,000

The 2025 10Best Cars and 10Best Trucks lists were released on December 3rd, 2024.

=== 10Best Cars ===
Model	Times on List
Cadillac CT4-V Blackwing	4
Cadillac CT5-V Blackwing	4
Chevrolet Corvette Stingray / E-Ray	26
Honda Accord	39
Honda Civic	5
Lucid Air Pure	2
Mercedes-Benz E450	3
Porsche 718 Boxster / Cayman	26
Subaru BRZ / Toyota GR86	5
Tesla Model 3 Long Range	1

=== 10Best Trucks ===
Model	Times on List
Chevrolet Trax	2
Ford Maverick	3
Ford Ranger Raptor	1
Genesis GV70	3
Honda CR-V	4
Hyundai Ioniq 5/5N	3
Kia Telluride	6
Porsche Macan	8
Ram 1500	7
Volkswagen ID. Buzz	1

== 2026 ==
Price cap: $115,000

The 2026 10Best Cars and 10Best Trucks lists were released on December 16th, 2025.

=== 10Best Cars ===
Model	Times on List
BMW M2	5
Cadillac CT4-V Blackwing	5
Cadillac CT5-V Blackwing	5
Chevrolet Corvette Stingray / E-Ray	27
Honda Accord	40
Honda Civic	6
Lucid Air Pure	3
Mercedes-Benz E450	4
Subaru BRZ / Toyota GR86	6
Volkswagen Golf GTI / Golf R	20

=== 10Best Trucks ===
Model	Times on List
Chevrolet/GMC Full-Size SUVs	1
Chevrolet Trax	2
Ford Maverick	3
Ford Ranger Raptor	2
Honda CR-V	4
Honda Passport	1
Hyundai Palisade Hybrid	1
Lucid Gravity	1
Porsche Macan	9
Ram 1500 / Ram TRX	7

== See also ==
- List of motor vehicle awards
