= Porsche Boxster and Cayman =

Porsche Boxster; Porsche Cayman; Porsche 718
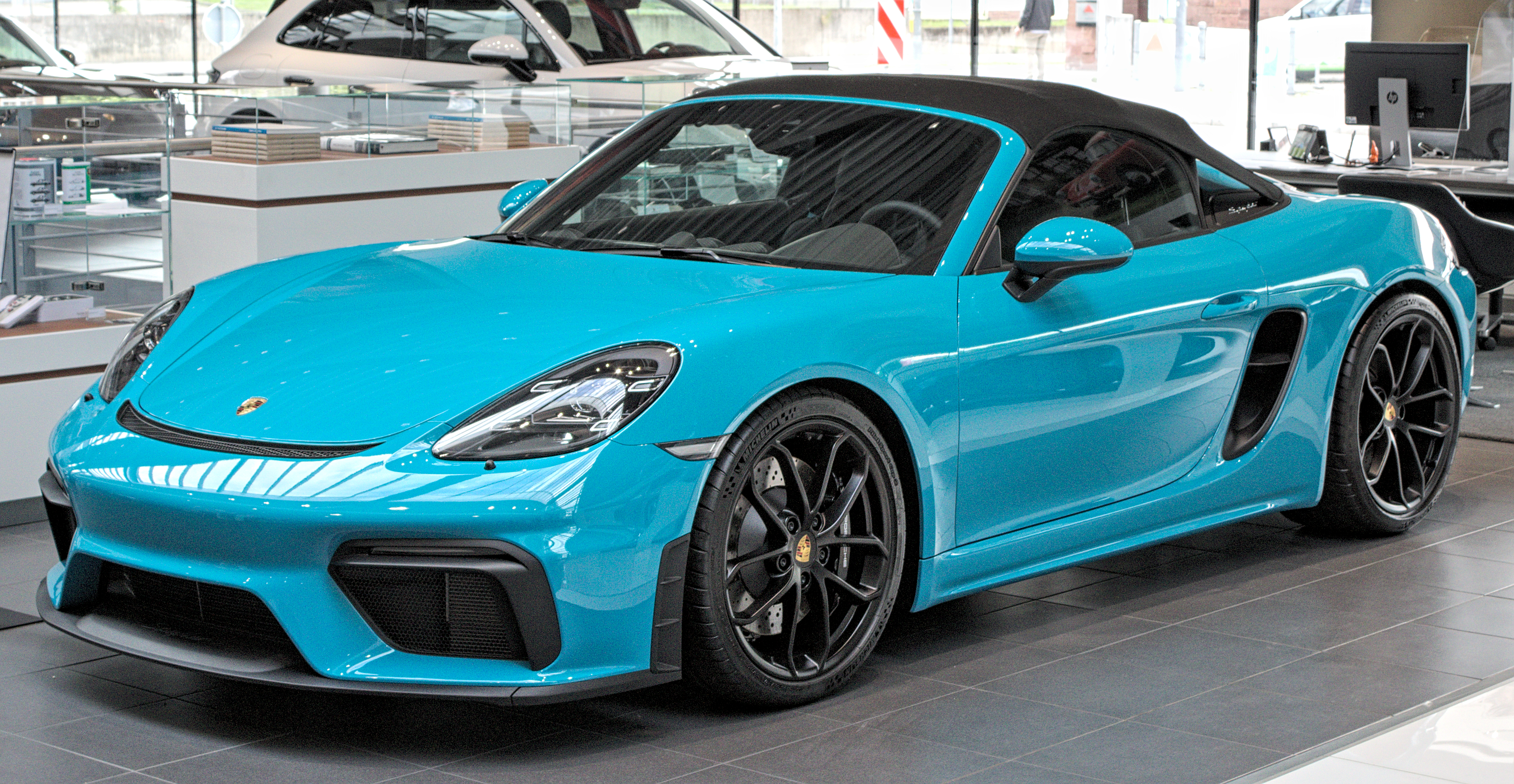
- Porsche Boxster Spyder (718)

Overview
- Manufacturer: Porsche AG
- Also called: Porsche Boxster; Porsche Cayman; Porsche 718 Boxster (2017–2025); Porsche 718 Cayman (2017–2025)
- Production: 1996–2025; 2005–2025
- Assembly: Germany: Stuttgart, Zuffenhausen (1996–2025); Finland: Uusikaupunki (Valmet, 1997–2011); Germany: Osnabrück (2012–2025)

Body and chassis
- Class: Sports car (S)
- Body style: 2-door roadster (Boxster); 2-door fastback coupé (Cayman; 2005–present)
- Layout: Rear mid-engine, rear-wheel drive
- Related: Porsche 911; Ruf RK Spyder

Chronology
- Predecessor: Porsche 968

Logo.

The Porsche Boxster and Cayman are mid-engine two-seater sports cars manufactured and marketed by German automobile manufacturer Porsche across four generations—as a two-door, two-seater roadster (Boxster) and a three-door, two-seater fastback coupé (Cayman).

The first-generation Boxster was introduced in 1996; the second-generation Boxster and the Cayman arrived in late 2005; and the third generation launched in 2012. From 2016 to 2025, the two models were marketed as the Porsche 718 Boxster and Porsche 718 Cayman.

The nameplate Boxster is a portmanteau of boxer, a reference to its flat or boxer engine, and Speedster, a nod to the original Porsche Speedster of the 1950's. The nameplate Cayman is an alternative spelling of caiman, a member of the alligator family.

Production of both models ceased in October 2025. Porsche CEO Oliver Blume said future production of full-electric replacements would arrive in the "medium term."

== Overview ==
=== Boxster ===
The Porsche Boxster is a mid-engine two-seater roadster. Unveiled at the 1993 Detroit Auto Show, the Boxster concept was Porsche's first road vehicle originally designed as a roadster since the 914. The first-generation Boxster Type 986 was introduced in late 1996; it was powered by a 2.5-litre flat six-cylinder engine. The design was heavily influenced by the 1993 Boxster Concept. In 2000, the base model was upgraded to a 2.7-litre engine and a new Boxster S variant was introduced with a 3.2-litre engine. In 2003, styling and engine output were upgraded on both variants.

Production of the Type 986 began at the former 928 facility in Stuttgart, Germany, in 1996. Valmet Automotive also manufactured Boxsters under contract to Porsche at a facility in Uusikaupunki, Finland. The Boxster was Porsche's biggest volume seller from its introduction in 1996 until the introduction of the Cayenne sport utility vehicle in 2003. As of September 2012, additional production of the Boxster started at the former Karmann-factory in Osnabrück.

In 2005, Porsche debuted the second generation of the Boxster Type 987, with a more powerful engine and styling inspired by the Carrera GT. Engine output increased in 2007, when the Boxster models received the engines from their corresponding Cayman variants. In 2009, the Boxster models received several new cosmetic and mechanical upgrades, further increasing engine output and performance. The third-generation Boxster Type 981 was launched at the 2012 Geneva Motor Show.

=== Cayman ===
First launched in 2005 for the 2006 model year, the Cayman is a coupé derived from Porsche's second and third generation Boxster roadster, styled in its first iteration by Pinky Lai. All Caymans up to 2012 were manufactured in Finland by Valmet Automotive. As Volkswagen assumed control of Porsche AG, production of Caymans and Boxsters after 2012 began in the former Karmann plant in Osnabrück, Germany, at the time owned by Volkswagen and also used for production of the 2012 Volkswagen Golf Mk6 convertible.

The car and the Cayman Islands are named after the caiman, a member of the alligator family. When the Cayman arrived at dealerships for sale, the automaker adopted four caimans at Stuttgart's Wilhelma Zoo.

Porsche brought an infringement lawsuit in 2009 against Crocs, the maker of the popular rubber shoes. At issue was the footwear company's clog name, also called Cayman. An injunction was granted against Crocs Europe, a division of the Longmont, Colorado-based shoe company preventing their use in Germany of the Cayman name.

=== 718 ===
The Porsche Boxster and Cayman Type 982 was introduced in 2016, for the 2017 model year, and renamed the Porsche 718 Boxster and Porsche 718 Cayman. Reviving the historic 718 moniker while switching engines from naturally aspirated flat sixes to small-displacement flat-four turbocharged units. The new 718 Cayman was also repositioned with an entry price lower than that of the 718 Boxster, in keeping with Porsche's higher pricing for roadster models.

In May 2025, Porsche North America confirmed the rumours that global “production for all current 718 Boxster and 718 Cayman variants, including RS models, is scheduled to end in October of" 2025. Porsche CEO Oliver Blume has confirmed future production of full-electric replacements but said they will arrive in the "medium term." Production of the 718 Boxster and 718 Cayman variants ended in 2025.

== First generation: 986 Boxster (1996–2004) ==
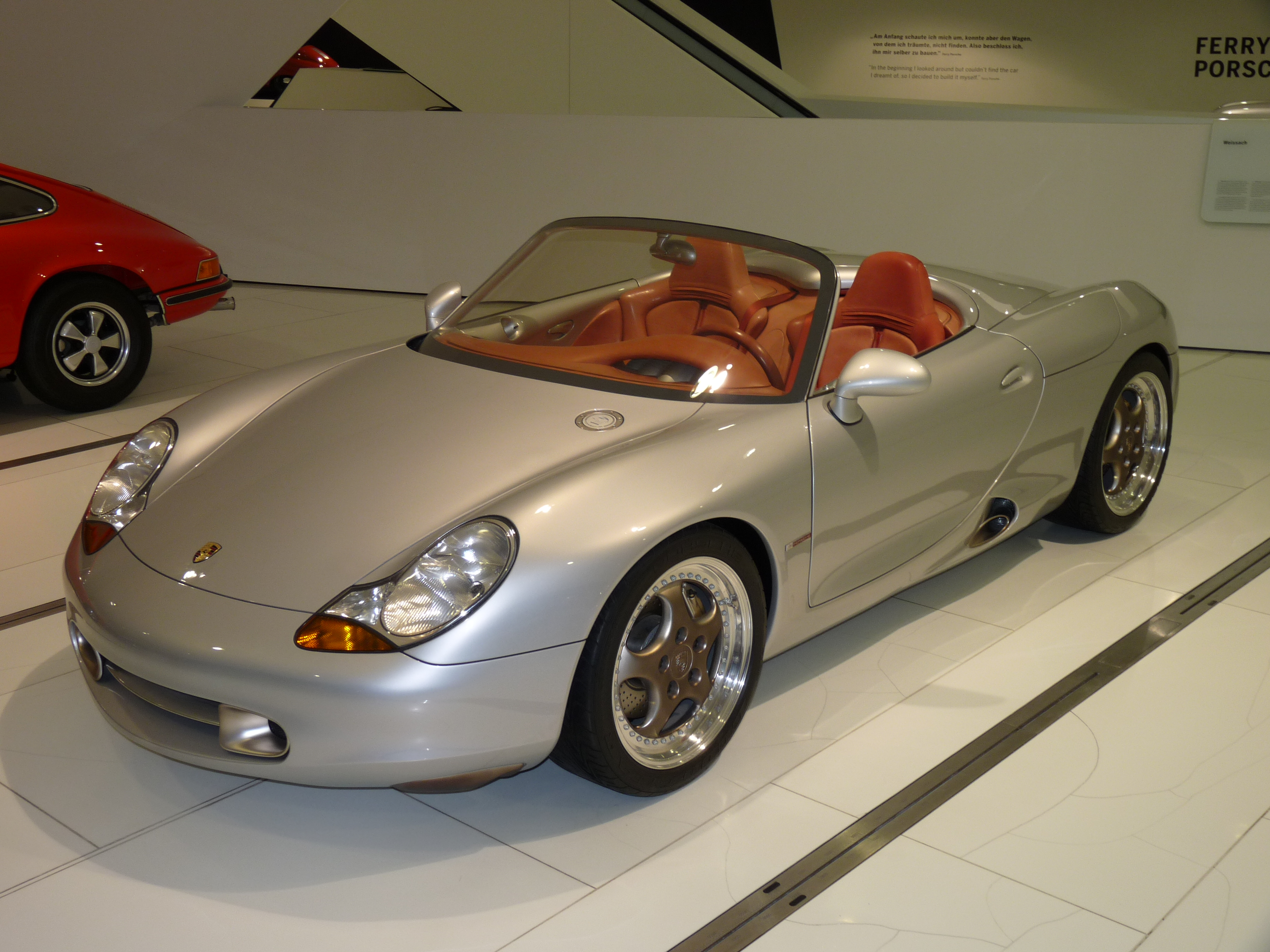
The 1993 Porsche Boxster concept, prior to the production model. Notice the different side air intake.

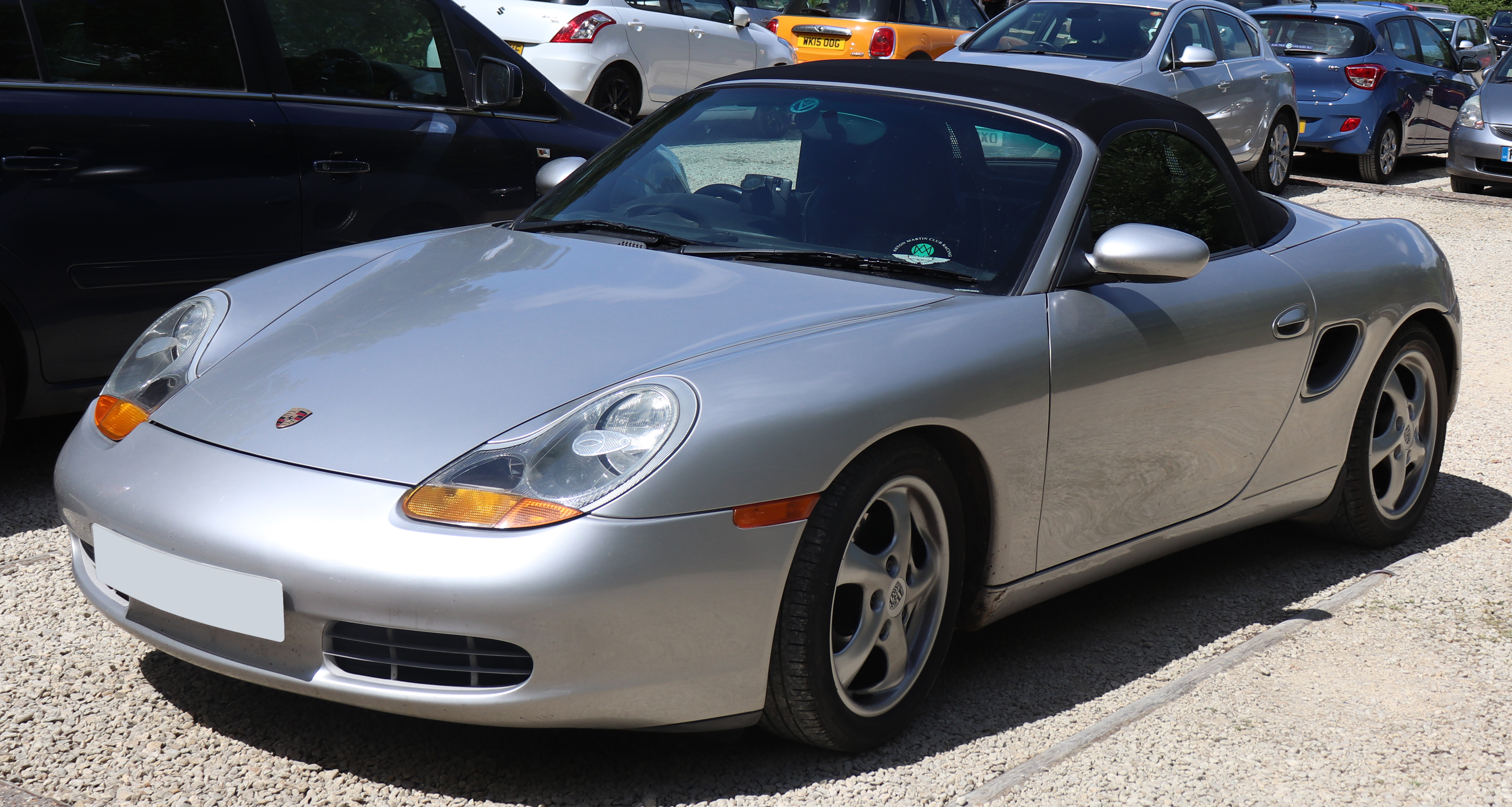
Production model.

Grant Larson's design, inspired by the 356 Cabriolet, Speedster, and 550 Spyder, stimulated a commercial turnaround for Porsche. Through consultation with Toyota, Porsche began widely sharing parts among models and slashed costs.

By October 1991 following a visit to the Tokyo Motor Show, Porsche, in dire straits, began to devise solutions to succeed the poor selling 928 and incoming 968 (a heavy update of the 944). In February 1992, Porsche began development of a successor to the 928 (mildly updated for 1992) and the recently released 968. By June 1992, out of 4 proposals based on dual collaboration between the 986 and 996 (993 successor) design teams, a proposal by Grant Larson and Pinky Lai was chosen by Harm Lagaay. In August 1992, a decision was made to develop the concept into a show vehicle, in time for the 1993 North American International Auto Show. After garnering widespread acclaim from the press and public upon presentation of the Boxster Concept in January 1993, the final production 986 production exterior design by Larson was frozen in March 1993. However, by the second half of 1993, difficulties arose with fitment of some components, resulting in the lengthening of the bonnet and requiring another design freeze by the fourth quarter of that year. Prototypes in 968 bodies were built to test the mid-engine power train of the 986 by the end of 1993, with proper prototypes surfacing in 1994. Pilot production began in the second half of 1995, ahead of series production in mid-1996.

The Boxster was released ahead of the 996. The 986 Boxster had the same bonnet, front wings, headlights, interior and engine architecture as the 996.

All 986 and 987 Boxsters use the M96, a water-cooled, horizontally opposed ("flat"), six-cylinder engine. It was Porsche's first water-cooled non-front engine. In the Boxster, it is placed in a mid-engine layout, while in the 911, the classic rear-engine layout was used. The mid-engine layout provides a low centre of gravity, a near-perfect weight distribution, and neutral handling.

The M96 engines had a number of failures, resulting in cracked or slipped cylinder liners, which were resolved by a minor redesign and better control of the casting process in late 1999. A failure for these early engines was a spate of porous engine blocks, as the manufacturer had difficulty in the casting process. In addition to causing problems with coolant and oil systems mingling fluids, it also resulted in Porsche's decision to repair faulty engines by boring out the cast sleeves on the cylinders where defects were noted in production and inserting new sleeves rather than scrapping the engine block. Normally, the cylinder walls are cast at the same time as the rest of the engine, this being the reason for adopting the casting technology.

The model received a minor facelift in 2002. The plastic rear window was replaced by a smaller glass window. The interior received a glove compartment, new electro-mechanical bonnet and boot release mechanism (with an electronic emergency release in the fuse box panel) and an updated steering wheel. Porsche installed a reworked exhaust pipe and air intake. In addition, the front headlight's amber indicators were replaced with clear indicators. The rear light cluster was also changed with translucent grey turn signals replacing the amber ones. The side marker lights on the front wings were changed as well, from amber to clear, except on American market cars where they remained amber. The bumpers were also changed slightly for a more defined, chiselled appearance, and new wheel designs were made available.

=== Special Edition ===
2004 Boxster S 550 Spyder 50th Anniversary Edition

- Celebrated the 50th anniversary of the 550 Spyder
- Limited to 1,953 units marked the 550s debut in 1953

== Second generation: 987 Boxster/Cayman (2005–2012) ==
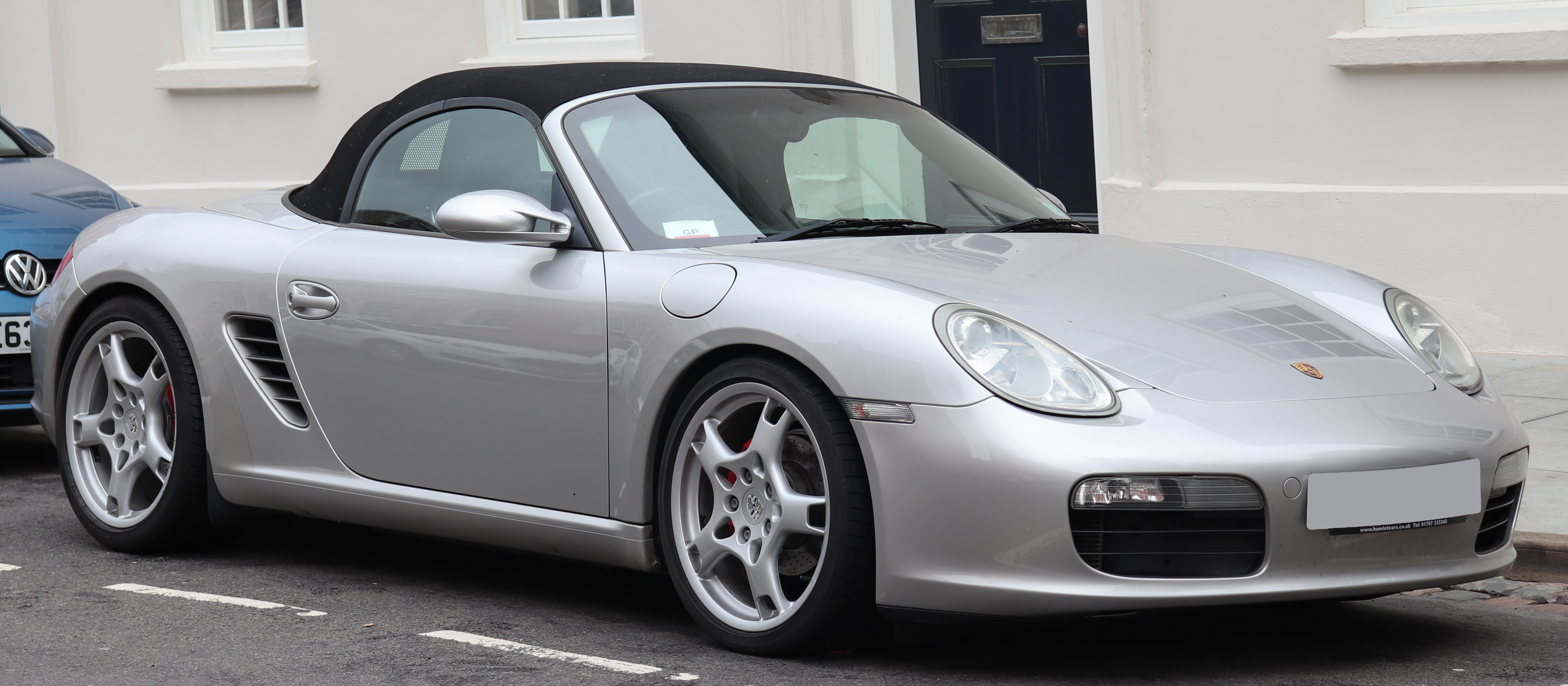
Porsche Boxster (987).

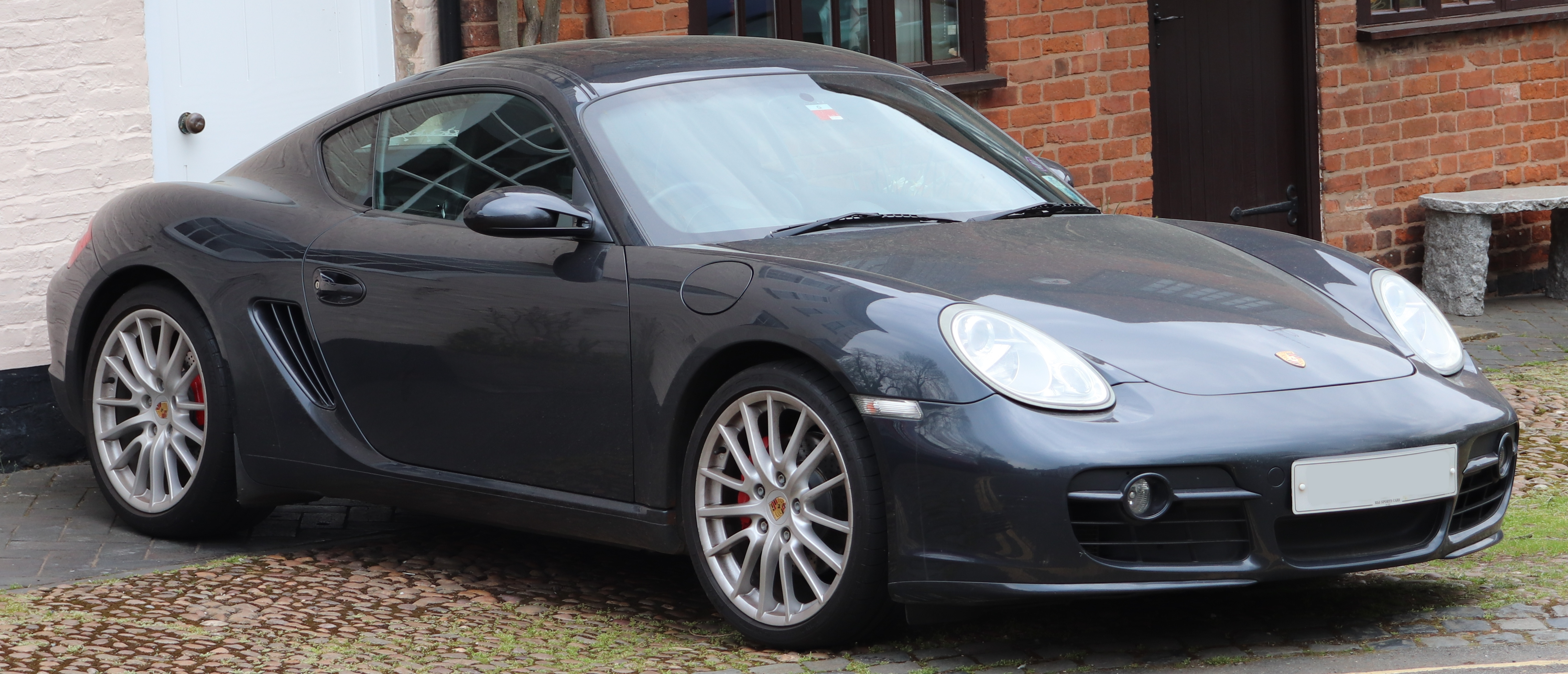
Porsche Cayman (987).

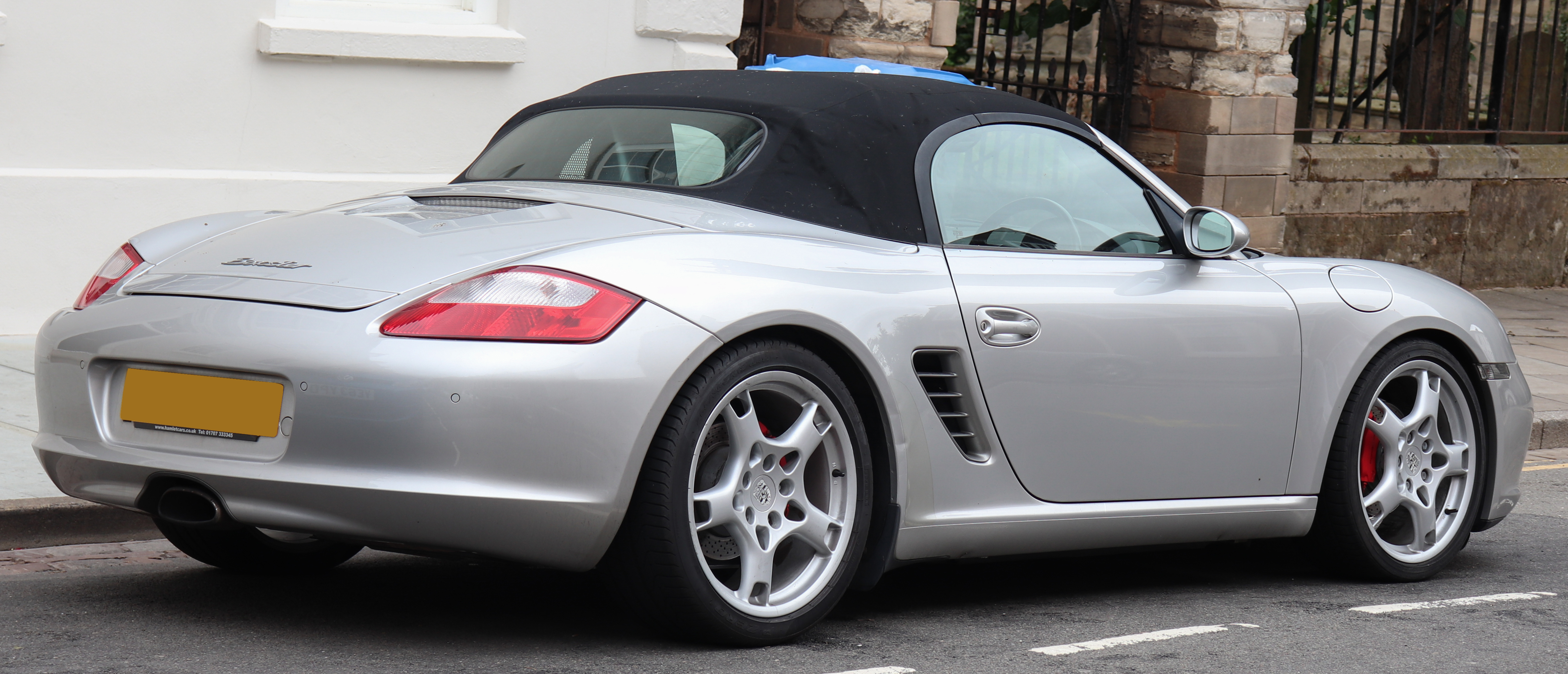
Porsche Boxster (987) (rear view).

The second generation of the Boxster debuted at the 2004 Paris Motor Show with the (997) 911 and became available for sale in 2005. Now known as the 987.1 which sold until 2008.

Revised styling included modified headlights, larger side intake vents and enlarged wheel arches to allow wheels up to 19 inches in diameter. Interior revisions included a more prominent circular theme for the instrument cluster and cooling vents. The base engine is a 2.7-litre 176 kW (239 PS; 236 hp) flat-six boxer engine, with the Boxster S getting a 3.2-litre 206 kW (280 PS; 276 hp) engine. For 2007, the base Boxster received a revised engine featuring VarioCam Plus and the Boxster S engine was upgraded from 3.2-litre to 3.4-litre. These upgrades made the Boxster series and the Cayman series equivalent in terms of power. The 987 is the last generation of the Boxster and Cayman series with hydraulic steering.

The Cayman S fastback coupé (987c) was first unveiled and went on sale in late 2005. The base Cayman followed in July 2006.

Both the Cayman and second-generation Boxster roadster share their mid-engine platform and many components, including the front wings and boot lid, doors, headlights, taillights, and forward portion of the interior. Styling incorporates cues from the 356/1, the 550 Coupé and the 904 Coupé. The Cayman's hatchback enables access to luggage areas on top of and in the back of the engine cover. The suspension design is fundamentally the same as that of the Boxster with revised settings due to the stiffer chassis with the car's fixed roof.

The Cayman S was powered by a 3.4-litre flat-six mated to a 6-speed manual transaxle, a 2.7-litre engine with a 5-speed transmission was standard for the base model. An electronically controlled 5-speed automatic (Tiptronic) was also available on the S and base models. The Tiptronic transmission for the 987.1 is a ZF 5HP transmission 19 model 1060.030 109/110.

The Boxster and Boxster S models received a facelift in 2008. Changes included an increase in engine displacement to 2.9-litre for the Boxster, incorporation of Direct Fuel Injection (DFI) for the Boxster S. Both models now came standard with a new 6-speed manual gearbox and were available with a 7-speed Porsche Doppelkupplungsgetriebe (PDK) dual clutch gearbox. Cosmetic changes included new head and tail lights, larger front air intakes with incorporated day time running lights, and an altered lower rear end flanked by twin diffusers.

The 987.2 debuted in February 2009 with a facelift of the Cayman. As with the Boxster, the base Cayman's engine displacement was increased to 2.9-litre while the Cayman S gained direct injection. Both the Cayman and Cayman S maintained a 7 kW (10 PS; 9 hp) power advantage over their roadster sibling, the Boxster. A limited-slip differential was now a factory option.

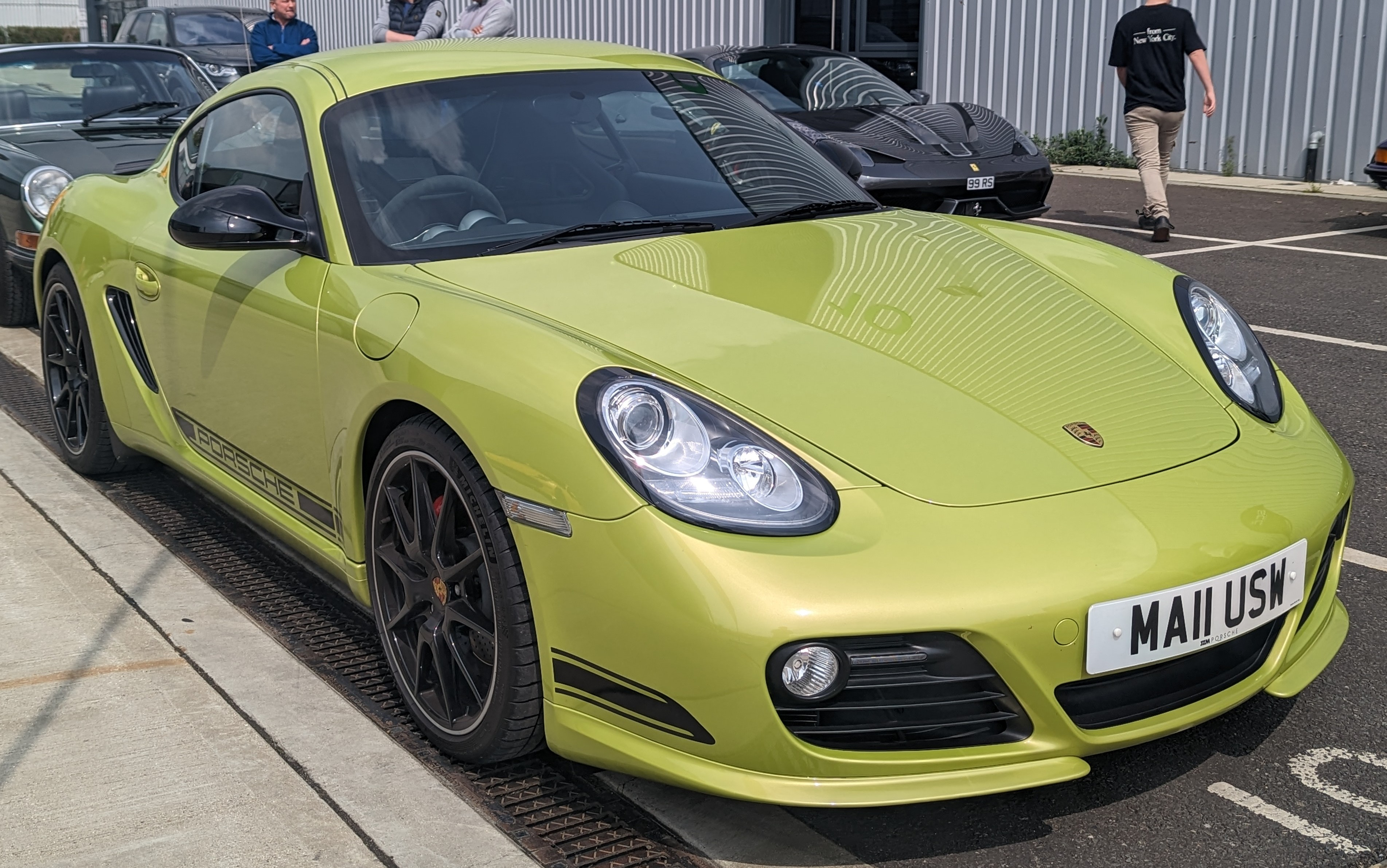
2011 Porsche Cayman R in Peridot Green Metallic, unique to the R as an optional colour.

The Cayman R was launched In 2011 as the pinnacle of the 987 generation. Based on the 2009 Cayman S, the Cayman R was given more power and a 55 kg weight reduction thanks to lightweight wheels, 997 GT2/GT3/Turbo aluminium doors, carbon seats, removal of air conditioning, storage compartments, entertainment system and rear wiper. The Cayman R was made in limited numbers and led the way to the formation of the Cayman GT4. Porsche's iconic lightweight "R" designation originated with the legendary 911 R in 1967, becoming a distinct symbol.

=== Special Editions ===
2008 Cayman Design edition

- Limited to 777 units

2008 Boxster RS 60 Spyder

- Paid homage to the Type 718 RS 60 Spyder
- Limited to 1,960 units marking the debut in 1960

2009 Boxster S Porsche Design Edition 2

- Limited to 500 units

2011 Boxster Black Edition

- Limited to 987 units marking the model designation 987

== Third generation: 981 Boxster/Cayman (2012–2016) ==
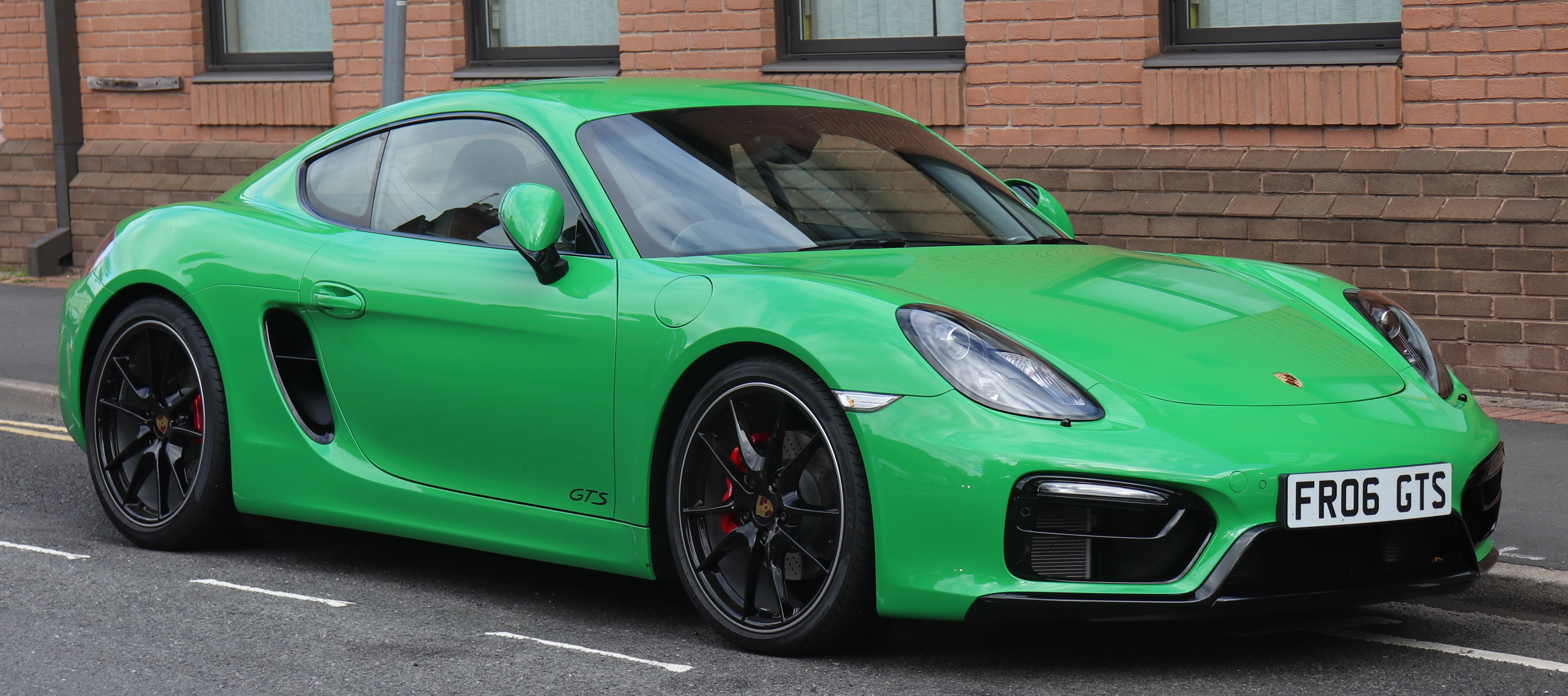
Porsche Cayman GTS (981).

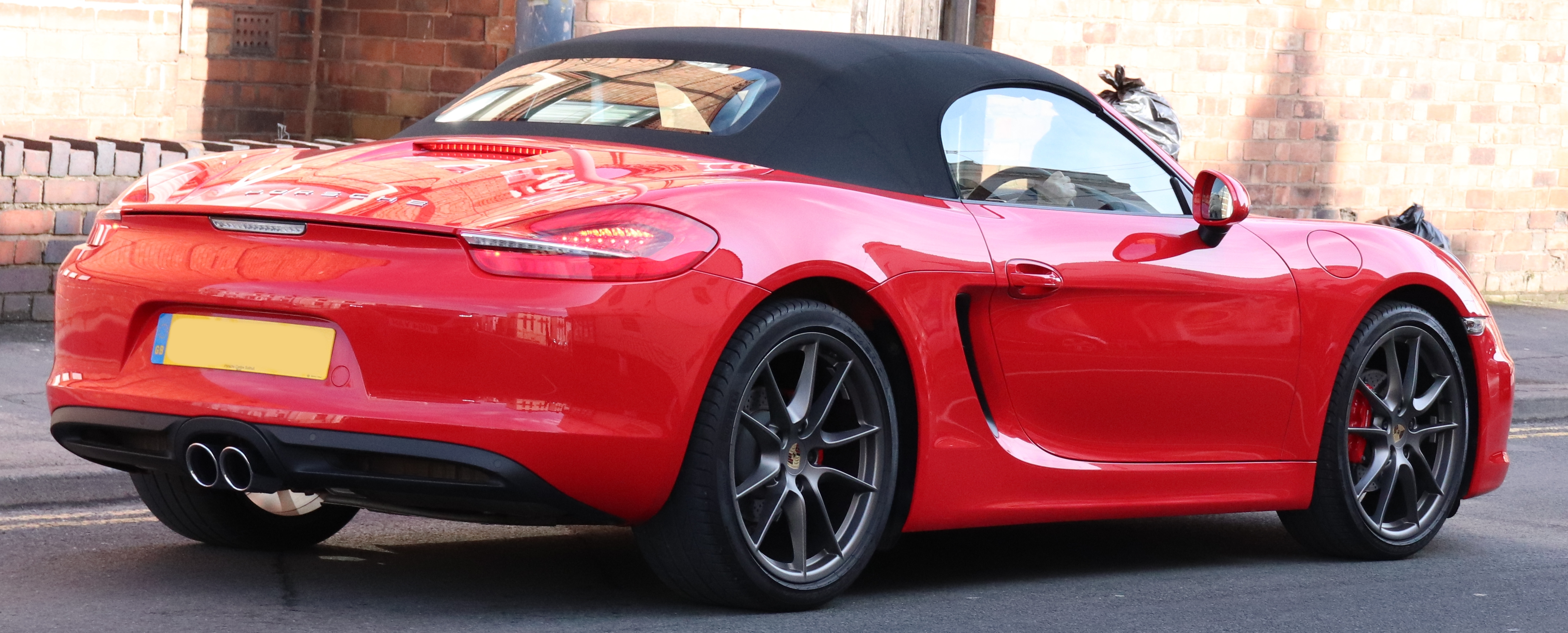
Porsche Boxster (981) rear.

The third-generation Boxster (internally known as the 981) was announced on 13 March 2012 at the Geneva Motor Show with sales starting in early summer 2012. The 981 Boxster reflected the new design language from the 911 (991) and 918, and featured new and revised engine and transmission specifications. Together with a new body, the type 981 Boxster featured a new, 40 per cent more torsionally rigid chassis, the front track was 40 mm (1.6 in) wider, the rear 18 mm (0.7 in) wider and the wheelbase extended by 60 mm (2.4 in), but with a small weight reduction of up to 35 kg (77 lb) compared to the previous type 987 Boxster.

The standard Boxster was fitted with a new 2.7-litre flat-6 engine, and the Boxster S was fitted with the existing 3.4-litre engine but with revised performance. Both engines were equipped with a 6-speed manual gearbox and an optional 7-speed reworked PDK. Both manual and automatic models were available with several technical options, including Porsche Torque Vectoring (PTV) and a Sport Chrono Package that included active transmission mounts, and made the PDK-equipped model even faster. Porsche claimed that the new generation Boxster provided fuel savings of 15% over the outgoing model.

The range was expanded in March 2014 with the addition of the GTS derivative, with slightly altered front and rear bumpers and an additional 11 kW (15 PS; 15 hp) from the 3.4-litre engine.

In 2015 the GT4 derivative was introduced, seeing the engine from a 991.1 Carrera S rotated 180 degrees. The GT4 also saw a lowered ride height, altered bumpers, a rear wing and additional GT package upgrades including brakes and certain suspension components from a 991.1 GT3. These special cars were manufactured from 2015 - 2016 with a total of 2500 being made, making this model one of the more desirable collector's cars in Porsche's lineup. The GT4 was widely considered one of the best cars of 2015/2016 where it won many awards for its impeccable handling and performance.

The third-generation Cayman was unveiled at the 2012 Geneva Motor Show. The production version of the 981 Cayman was released as a 2014 model in the spring of 2013. The new car was available in both the standard trim with a 2.7-litre engine, and in the S trim with a 3.4-litre engine. Both versions were available with either a 6-speed manual or a dual-clutch 7-speed PDK transmission.

The 981 Cayman featured upgrades including a new body, a longer wheelbase, a wider front track, electrically powered steering, and a redesigned interior that matched the firm's contemporaneous 911 models.

The new model gained acclaim in the motoring press as one of the best handling sports cars at any price, due to its mid-engine layout and driving dynamics. The Cayman S benefited from the same engine and running gear as Porsche's 3.4-litre version of the 911.

=== Special Edition ===
2016 Boxster Spyder

- Limited to 2,486

== Fourth generation: 982 Boxster/Cayman (2016–2025) ==
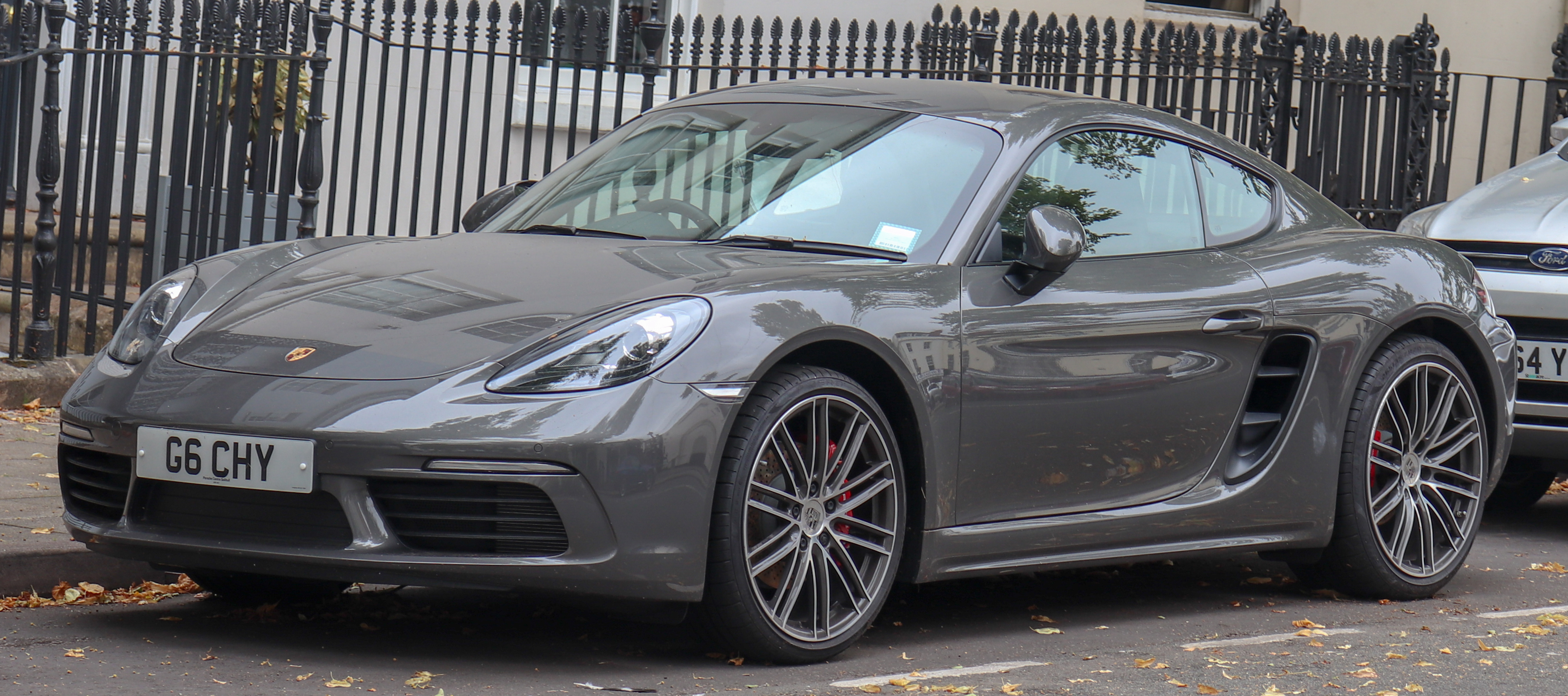
Porsche 718 Cayman S.

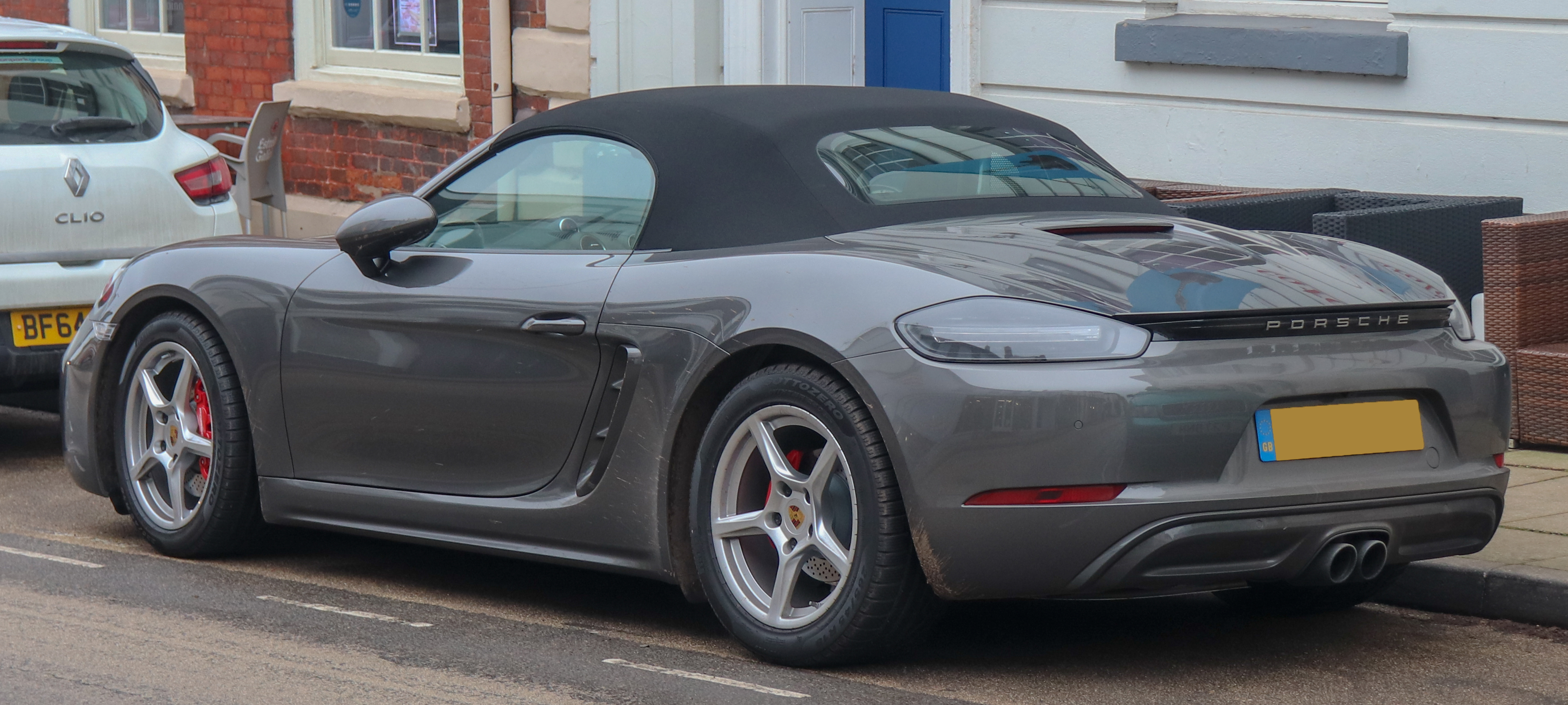
Porsche 718 Boxster S (rear view).

With the new 982-generation, the marketing designation of the Boxster and Cayman was changed to Porsche 718, a nod to Porsche's racing heritage that won the Targa Florio race in 1959 and 1960. Because the 718 Cayman / Boxster has lost two cylinders, going from a naturally aspirated flat-6 engine to a turbocharged flat-4 engine, the name is meant to evoke a racing series that was won by a light car which outmaneuvered the cars with more powerful engines.

The timeline of the 718 release started in 2016, with first model availability scheduled for June. The 718 base models featured two new horizontally opposed flat-4 turbocharged engines of 2.0-litre and 2.5-litre displacements with increased torque and horsepower along with lower fuel consumption. The S model's turbocharger utilises Variable Turbine Geometry (VTG) technology. The Boxster S could accelerate from 0–97 km/h (0–60 mph) in 4.1 seconds, and the Cayman S in 3.9 seconds. In October 2017, the GTS models were announced with their 2.5-litre engines upgraded to 272 kW (370 PS; 365 hp).

In 2020, the GTS 4.0 model of both the Boxster and the Cayman was released with a new engine, a slightly de-tuned version of the 4.0-litre naturally aspirated six-cylinder boxer engine found in the GT4. In the GTS 4.0 trim the engine is rated at 294 kW (400 PS; 394 hp) and 420 N⋅m (310 lb⋅ft) of torque while the GT4 engine has 309 kW (420 PS; 414 hp). The GTS comes standard with a six-speed manual gearbox, -20 mm sport suspension with adaptive dampers and a mechanical limited-slip differential.

The exterior of the 718 Boxster and Cayman is very similar to the third generation, in fact more of an evolution than a redesign. The most notable changes are to the rear of the car, which now has a long black-trim bar across the rear connecting the two taillights. The headlights and bumper are also heavily reworked. On the sides, the mirrors have been redesigned, taking cue from the SportDesign mirrors on the GT3. Porsche also began offering additional exterior colour options including Miami Blue, Chalk, and Graphite Blue Metallic.

The interior remains very similar to the 981 Cayman / Boxster and the 991.2 generation of the Porsche 911. The main change is the new PCM 4.0 infotainment system, which replaces the PCM 3.1. The steering wheel comes with a mode selector switch that includes a selection of Sports and Sports Plus driving modes, resulting in snappier throttle response at the cost of fuel efficiency. Overall, the most prominent design features of the 981 Cayman / Boxster remain, including large air induction ports on the side, and the prominent horizontal aluminium piece used for adding oil and coolant in the boot.

Despite the loss of two cylinders, the 718 Cayman / Boxster are mechanically superior to the 981 model; acceleration is faster and steering is improved according to Top Gear and Motor Trend. In spite of the view of some that the new engine "cheapens the experience", the 718 Cayman was declared Motor Trend's 2nd best Drivers car in 2017, which praised the car's handling and throttle response. Giving the award, Miguel Cortina noted, "The suspension is just what you want to feel in a car like this—stiff, sporty, rigid. You get a very good sense of what is happening on the road."

In 2021, Porsche unveiled the 718 Cayman GT4 RS, the first Cayman to receive the RS treatment which is usually reserved for the 911 models. With a 4.0 L naturally aspirated flat-six derived from the 911 GT3, it produces 500 PS (368 kW; 493 hp) and 450 N⋅m (332 lbf⋅ft) which allows it to accelerate from 0–100 km/h (0–62 mph) in 3.4 seconds. It produces 25% more downforce than the GT4 variant, through a swan-neck attachment fixed rear wing. The GT4 RS lapped the Nürburgring Nordschleife 23 seconds faster than the GT4.

=== Special Editions ===
2021 Boxster 25 Years

- Celebrated the 25th anniversary of the 1996 Boxster
- Limited to 1,250 units

== Fifth generation: Boxster/Cayman (2026) ==
Porsche has already confirmed that the next-generation Boxster and Cayman, due to hit the market in 2026, will be all-electric. However, due to the decline in sales of electric vehicles like the Taycan, Porsche has decided that the Boxster and Cayman will retain internal combustion engines. Only the most powerful models will have them, with rumours suggesting they will have the same hybrid 3.6-litre six-cylinder boxer engine from the 911.

== Motorsport ==
=== Boxster ===
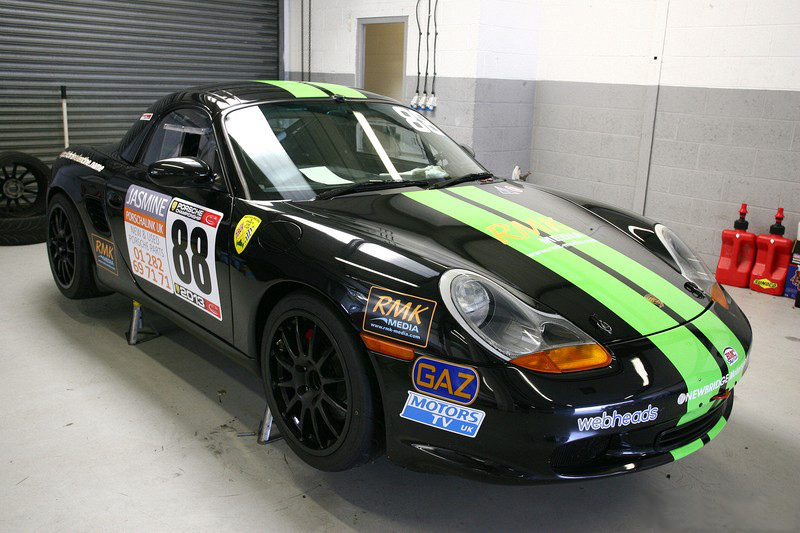
UK Race Boxster.

- In North America, the Boxster has taken part in the Continental Tire Sports Car Challenge Street Tuner class. A Boxster Spec racing series based on the early 1997–1999 2.5-litre models is organized by National Auto Sport Association (NASA). The Porsche Club of America also has a Spec Boxster class, and uses the same rules as NASA.
- In the UK, Boxsters take part in the BRSCC Porsche Championship, in Spec or Production specification and in the Porsche Club Championship.
- In New Zealand, the 986 Boxsters are raced in the Pirelli Porsche Race Series in both 2.5– and 2.7–litre classes.

=== Cayman ===
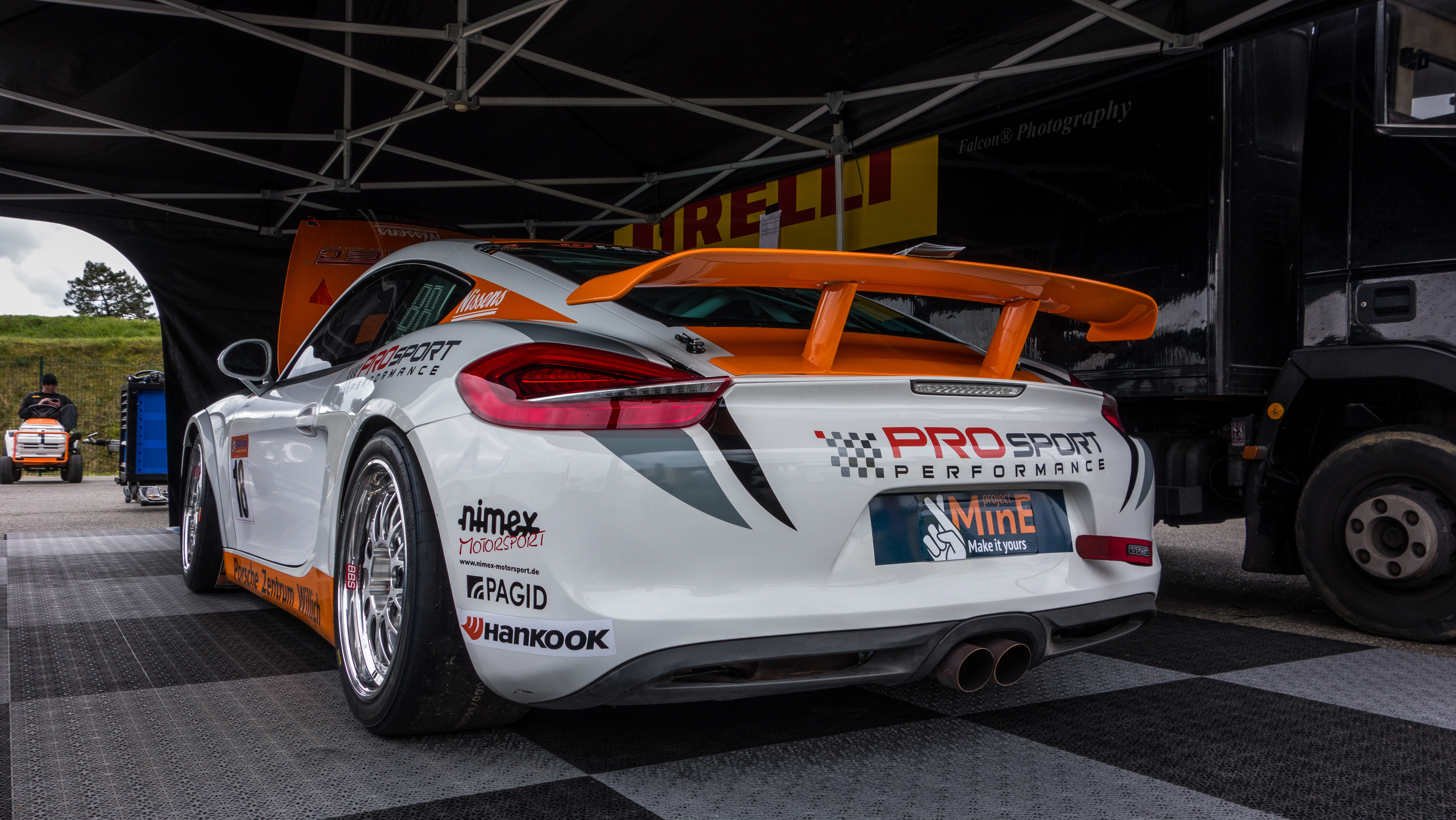
Porsche Cayman 981 SP GT4.

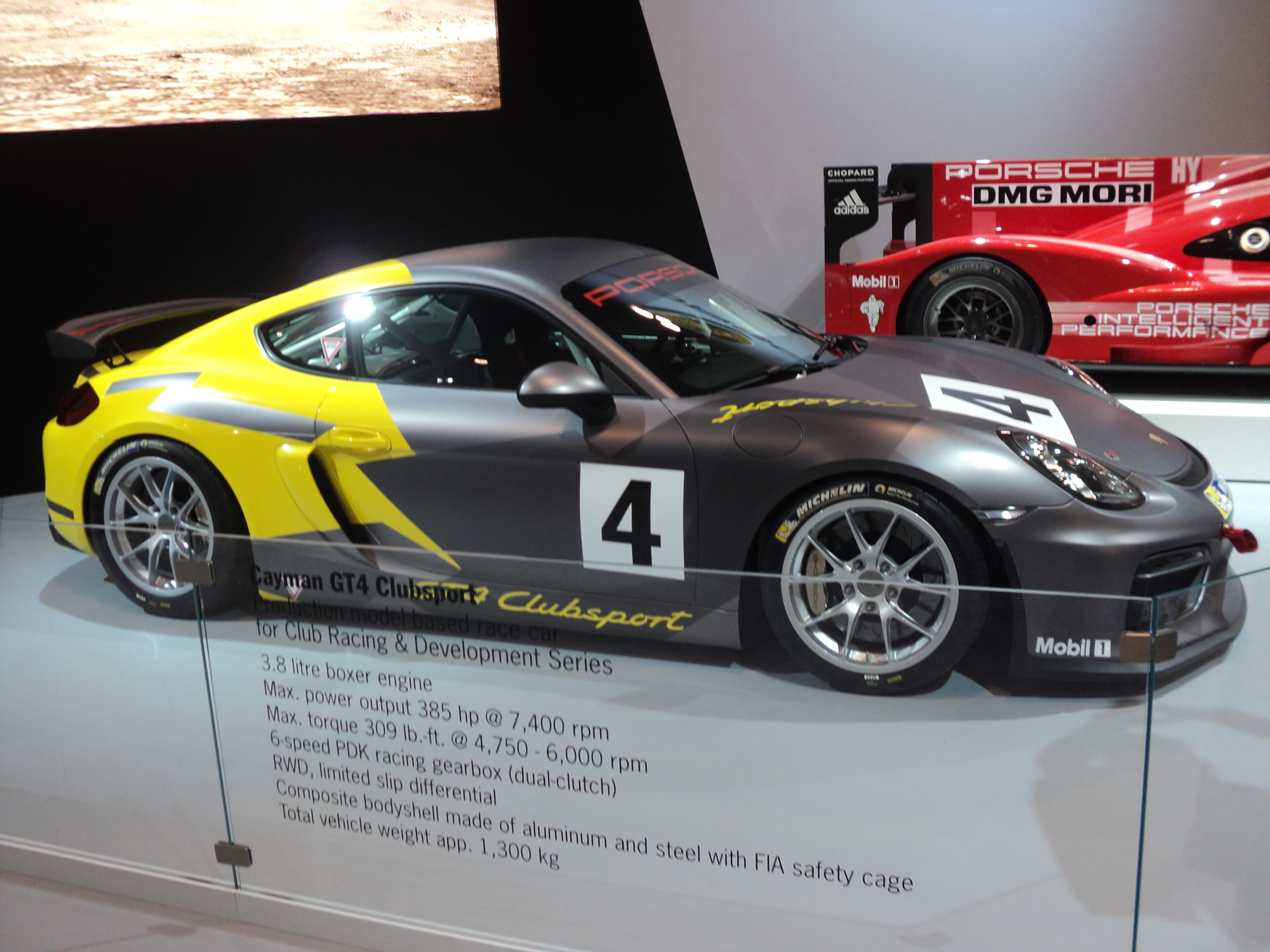
Porsche Cayman GT4 Clubsport.

- Jack Baldwin of GTSport Racing campaigns a Porsche Cayman S in the Pirelli World Challenge. GTSport Racing is the world's most successful Cayman program as Baldwin has scored 8 wins and over a dozen podium finishes in his Porsche Cayman S campaign, including two second place Championship finishes (2013, 2014) and one third place Championship finish (2012).
- Ernie Jakubowski won race 10 of the 2010 SCCA World Challenge event at Virginia International Raceway in the GTS class.
- One-make Cayman Cup club racing championships are run in France and Italy.
- BGB Motorsports entered two Caymans in the 2010 Continental Challenge season.
- The 2013 Rolex 24 Hours of Daytona, Caymans took the podiums in the GX class, where it placed 1, 2 and 3. This competition was the Cayman platform's first endurance race in the U.S., the race was won by car number 16 of Napleton Racing, driven by David Donohue, Shane Lewis, Jim Norman, and Nelson Canache. Bullet Racing finished second and third place went to BGB. It gave Porsche its 75th class victory and the title of the marque with the most wins in the series.
- PROsport Performance campaigned multiple Cayman PRO4s (previously called Cayman SP) in the GT4 European Series, winning the Driver's and Teams' championship titles in 2016. PROsport Performance also won the C (GT4) class at the 2017 Liqui Moly Bathurst 12 Hour. The final evolution of the PROsport Performance Cayman PRO4 GT4 is based on the 981 Cayman S, equipped with a PDK transmission, added 981 Cayman GT4 side air scoops, and spliced with the front end of the 991 Porsche GT3 Cup chassis. The car produced approximately 380 hp with a 3.4 L engine. This car competed as another Porsche with the 981 Cayman GT4 Clubsport in the GT4 class of various motorsports competitions.
- The Cayman GT4 Clubsport has raced since 2016 in the GT4 European Series, British GT Championship GT4-class, Dunlop Britcar Endurance Championship, the Italian GT Championship in the Cayman-class, the Cayman GT4 Trophy by Manthey Racing at the Nürburgring Nordschleife as part of the VLN endurance championship, the 24 Hours Nürburgring, the Pirelli World Challenge GTS-class, the Continental Tire SportsCar Challenge GS-class, the 24H Series, and since 2017 in the FFSA GT Championship, Blancpain GT Series Asia GT4-class and Bathurst 12 Hour.
- For the 2021 Trans-Am Series, a modified 2016 Porsche Cayman GT4 was entered by Kryptauri Racing with Rob Crocker as the driver. Featuring a 3.8-litre 911 Carrera GTS engine complete with Porsche's OEM X51 power package upgrades, this modified Cayman GT4 produces approximately 400 horsepower to the rear wheels. It was built to compete in Trans-Am's Super GT category.

== Awards ==
The Boxster and Cayman received a number of international and regional awards:

- Autocar: Best Roadster in the World, Five Star Car for the Boxster GT4 in 2016
- Auto Express: 2007 & 2006 Greatest Drives & Best Sporting Car, 2012 Roadster of the Year
- Automobile: All Stars Award nine times including 2007, 2010 and 2012
- Autoweek: 2005 Frankfurt Motor Show Editors' Best in Show
- Car and Driver: On the 10Best list 23 times, from 1998 through 2003, and 2006 through 2022.
- evo: Magazine's recommended buy in the Sports Car category since the model's introduction. Included in the lists (without order) Best performance cars 2014, Best sportscars 2017. Winner evo Car of the Year 2015 (Cayman GT4).
- J.D. Power: Highest ranked in Compact Premium Sporty Car, Initial Quality Study 2006, 2007, 2013, 2014, 2015, and Automotive Performance, Execution and Layout Study 2013, 2014, 2015, 2016
- Motor Authority – Best Car To Buy 2014
- Motor Trend: 2009 Best Driver's Car
- Playboy Magazine: 2006 Car of the Year
- Scottish Car of the Year: 2012 Best Drop Top
- South African Car of the Year: 2013, 2014
- Top Gear – 2016 Sports Car of the Year.
- What Car?: 2015 Sports Car of the Year
- What Car?: 2021 Sports Car of the Year (for the 718 Cayman GTS 4.0). What Car? awarded the 718 Cayman five stars out of five in its review of the car.
- World Car of the Year: World Performance Car in 2006, 2013 and 2017.

== Mechanical issues and lawsuit ==
Boxster models manufactured between 4 May 2001 and 21 February 2005 have suffered engine failure due to a fault with the intermediate shaft (IMS) bearing, which resulted in a class action lawsuit against Porsche Cars North America (referred to as Eisen v. Porsche Cars North America). A settlement was agreed in March 2013, subject to court approval. Some say IMS bearing failure issues are not limited to the model years covered in the settlement.

On March 5, 2019, Porsche issued a recall on 14,388 Caymans and Boxsters, due to a luggage compartment bracket that could puncture the fuel tank in certain collision instances.
