= Genesis GV70 =

Korean luxury crossover SUV

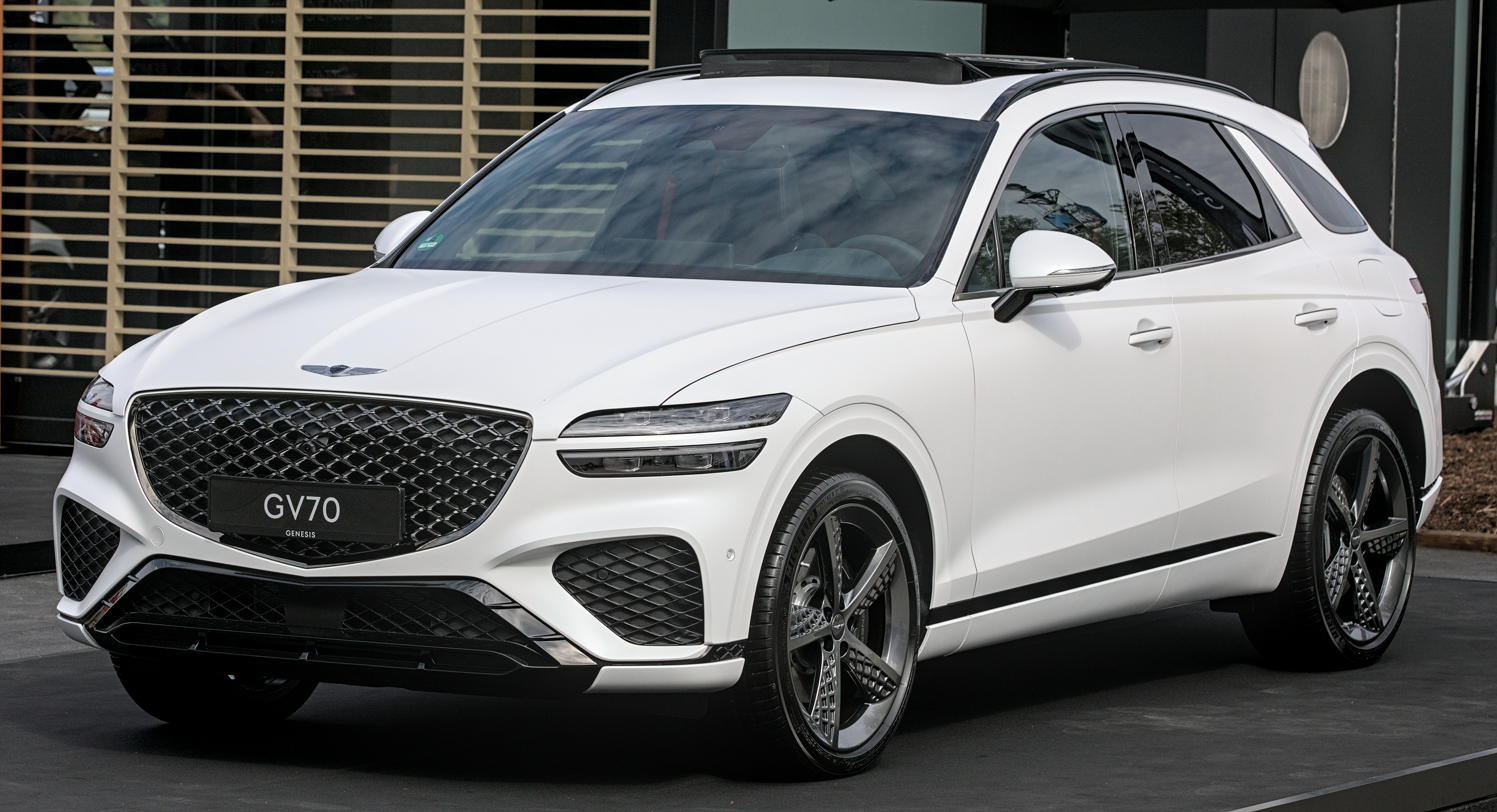
- 2021 Genesis GV70 Sport

Overview
- Manufacturer: Genesis Motor (Hyundai)
- Model code: JK1
- Production: 2020–present
- Model years: 2022–present
- Assembly: South Korea: Ulsan (Ulsan Plant 2); United States: Montgomery, Alabama (HMMA)
- Designer: Ki-Euk Kim (exterior)

Body and chassis
- Class: Compact luxury crossover SUV
- Body style: 5-door SUV
- Layout: Front-engine, rear-wheel-drive; Front-engine, four-wheel-drive; Dual-motor, all-wheel-drive (Electrified GV70)
- Platform: Hyundai M3

Powertrain
- Engine: Petrol: 2.5 L Smartstream G2.5 T-GDi I4; 3.5 L Smartstream G3.5 T-GDi V6; Diesel: 2.2 L Smartstream D2.2 CRDi I4
- Electric motor: 2x Permanent Magnet Synchronous Motors (Electrified GV70)
- Power output: 304 PS (224 kW; 300 hp) (2.5T); 380 PS (279 kW; 375 hp) (3.5T); 210 PS (154 kW; 207 hp) (2.2D); 435 PS (320 kW; 429 hp) (EV)
- Transmission: 8-speed automatic 1-speed reduction gear (Electrified GV70)
- Battery: 77.4 or 84 kWh Lithium-ion battery (Electrified GV70)
- Plug-in charging: 350 kW 800 V DC (Electrified GV70); 11 kW AC (Electrified GV70); V2L: 3.6 kW (Electrified GV70)

Dimensions
- Wheelbase: 2,875 mm (113.2 in)
- Length: 4,715 mm (185.6 in)
- Width: 1,910 mm (75.2 in)
- Height: 1,630 mm (64.2 in)
- Kerb weight: 1,820–1,985 kg (4,012–4,376 lb) (2.5T); 1,975–2,010 kg (4,354–4,431 lb) (3.5T); 1,860–2,010 kg (4,101–4,431 lb) (2.2D); 2,230–2,335 kg (4,916–5,148 lb) (EV)

The Genesis GV70 (Korean: 제네시스 GV70) is a compact luxury D-segment crossover SUV manufactured by Korean luxury automaker Genesis, a luxury vehicle division of Hyundai. Internally codenamed JK1, it is the second SUV model from the brand after the mid-size GV80.

== Overview ==
=== Launch ===
The Genesis GV70 was officially launched globally on December 8, 2020, via a live-streamed cinematic film. The GV70 marks the Genesis brand's entry into the luxury compact crossover segment and their second SUV overall, with a choice of three powertrains: a 2.2-liter diesel (non-U.S. markets only), 2.5-liter turbocharged engine, and the tier-topping 3.5-liter twin-turbocharged engine. GV70 production began in 2021 and was offered for sale for the 2022 model year. The GV70 is built in South Korea as well as the Hyundai Motor Manufacturing Plant (HMMA) in Montgomery, Alabama for the U.S. market. Beginning for the 2027 model year, Hyundai Motor Group will no longer produce Genesis models at HMMA, shifting exclusive production for all Genesis vehicles to South Korea, due to growth and demand for Hyundai models in North America.

At launch, GV70 was marketed with groundbreaking technology that was previously unseen in the automotive industry, such as a fingerprint authentication system.

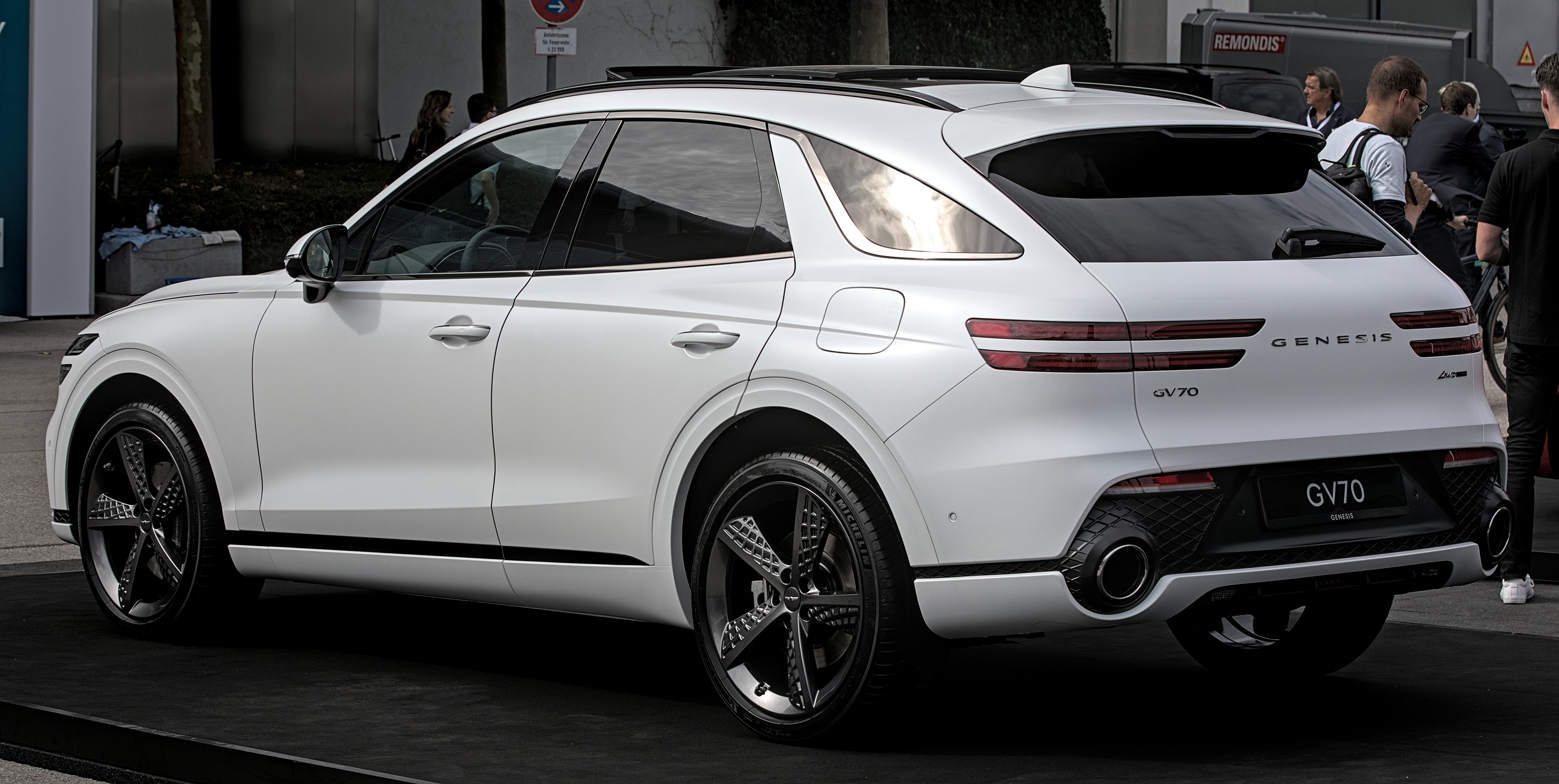
2021 Genesis GV70 Sport Rear View

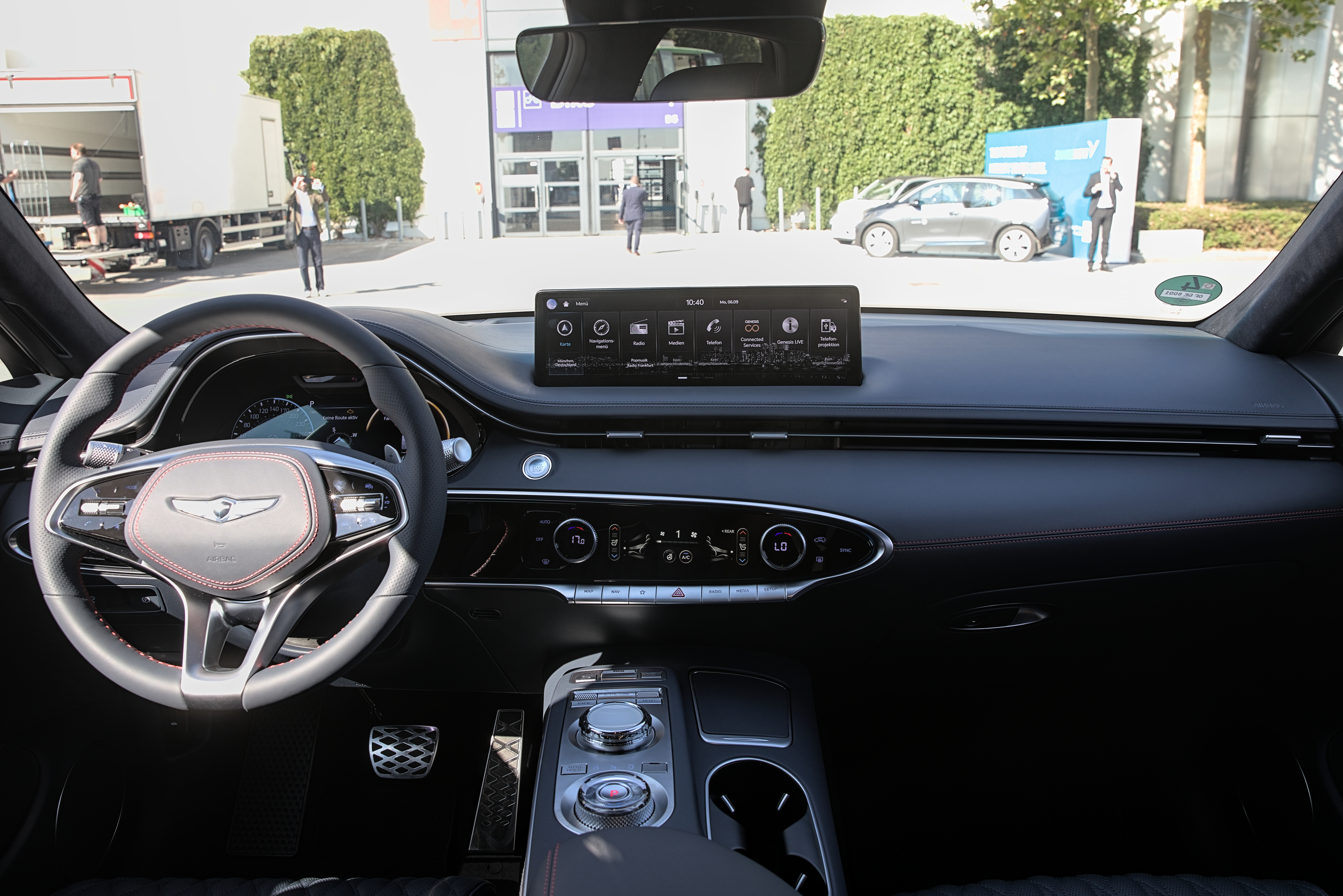
Interior

=== Facelift ===
A refreshed GV70 was unveiled on April 26, 2024 and went on sale in South Korea on May 8, 2024. Changes include redesigned headlamps, front grille, wheels, climate controls and center console. The 12.3-inch instrument cluster and 14.5-inch infotainment screen were replaced with a new 27-inch OLED screen.

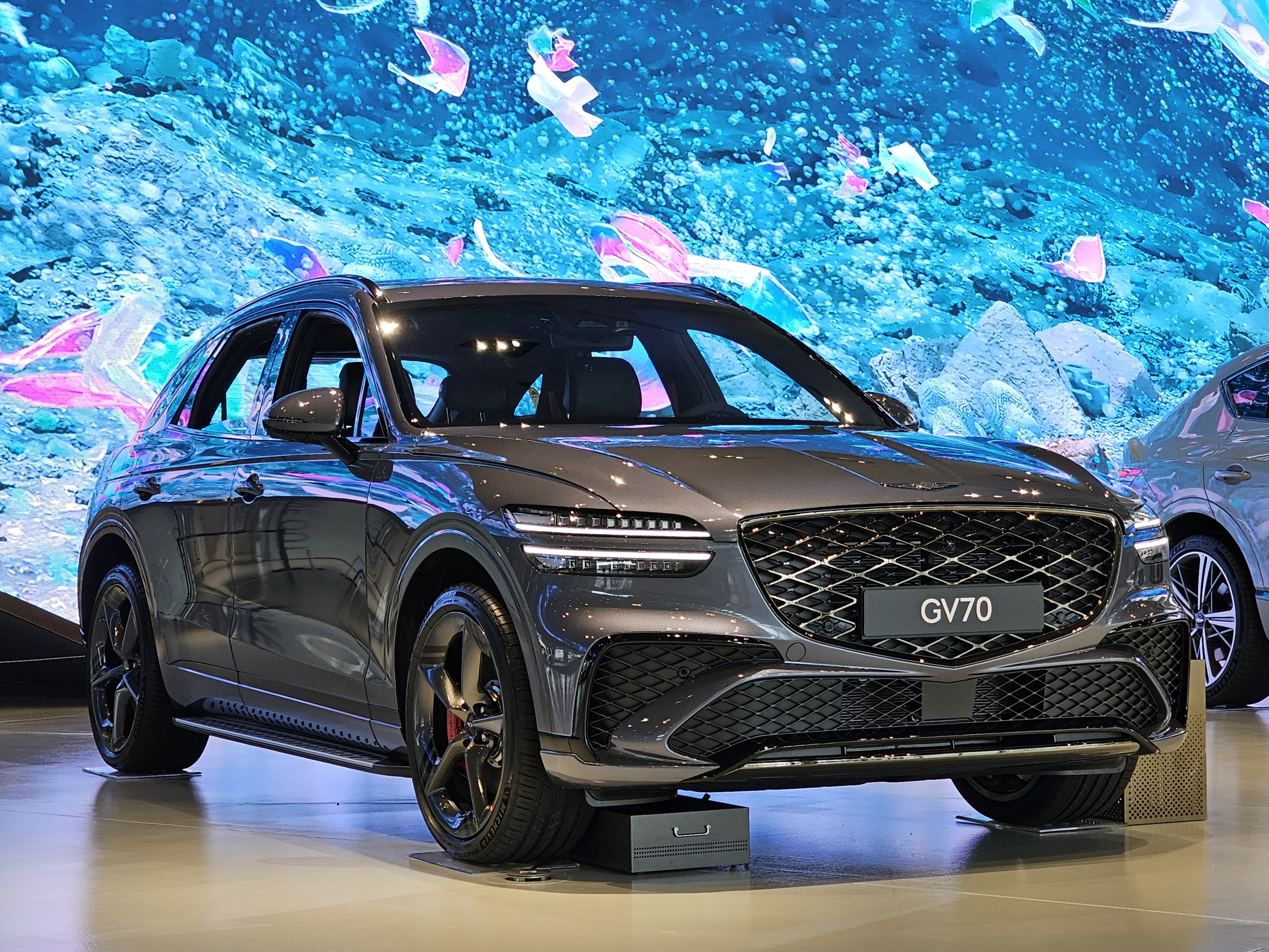
Front View

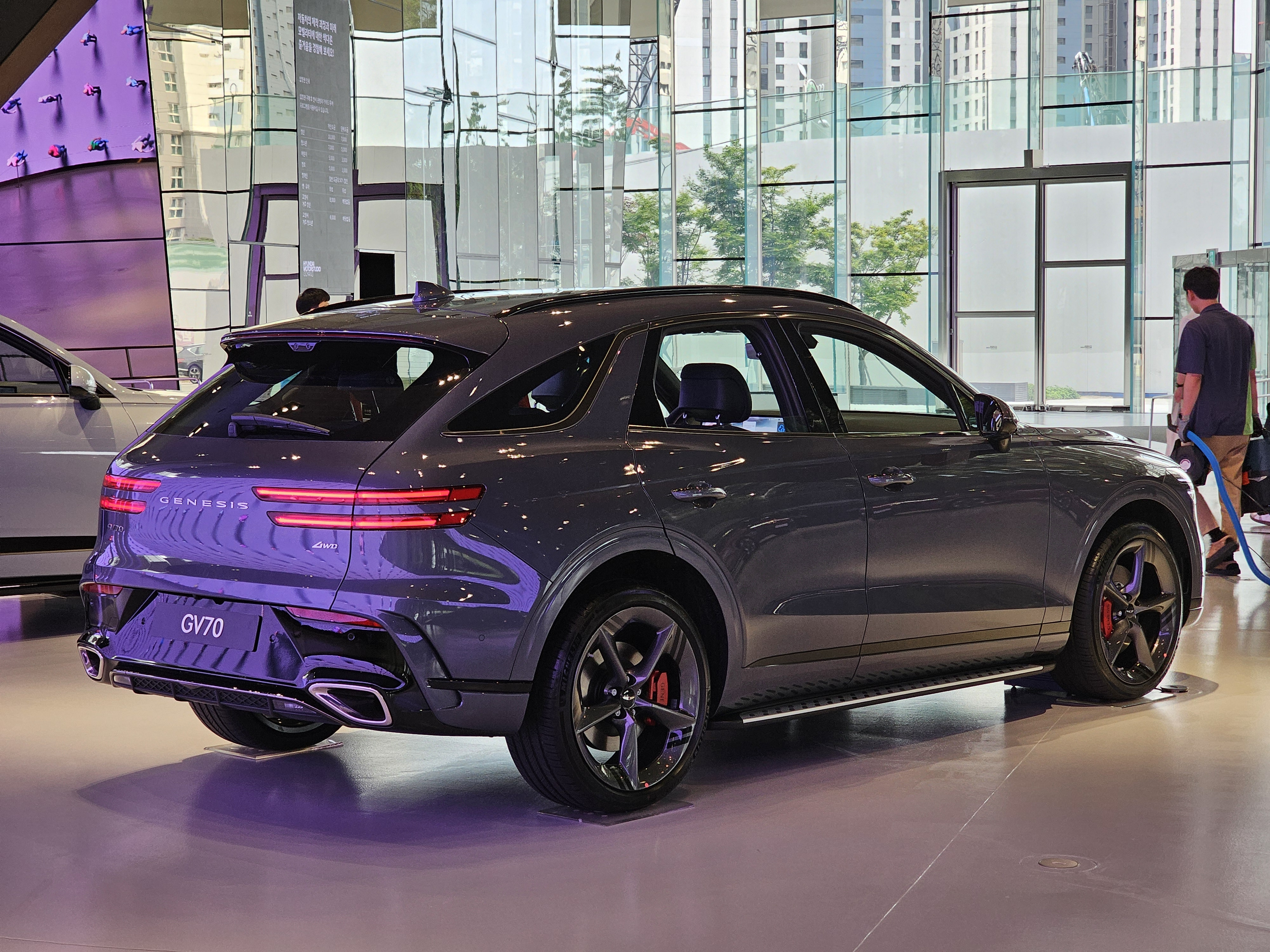
Rear View

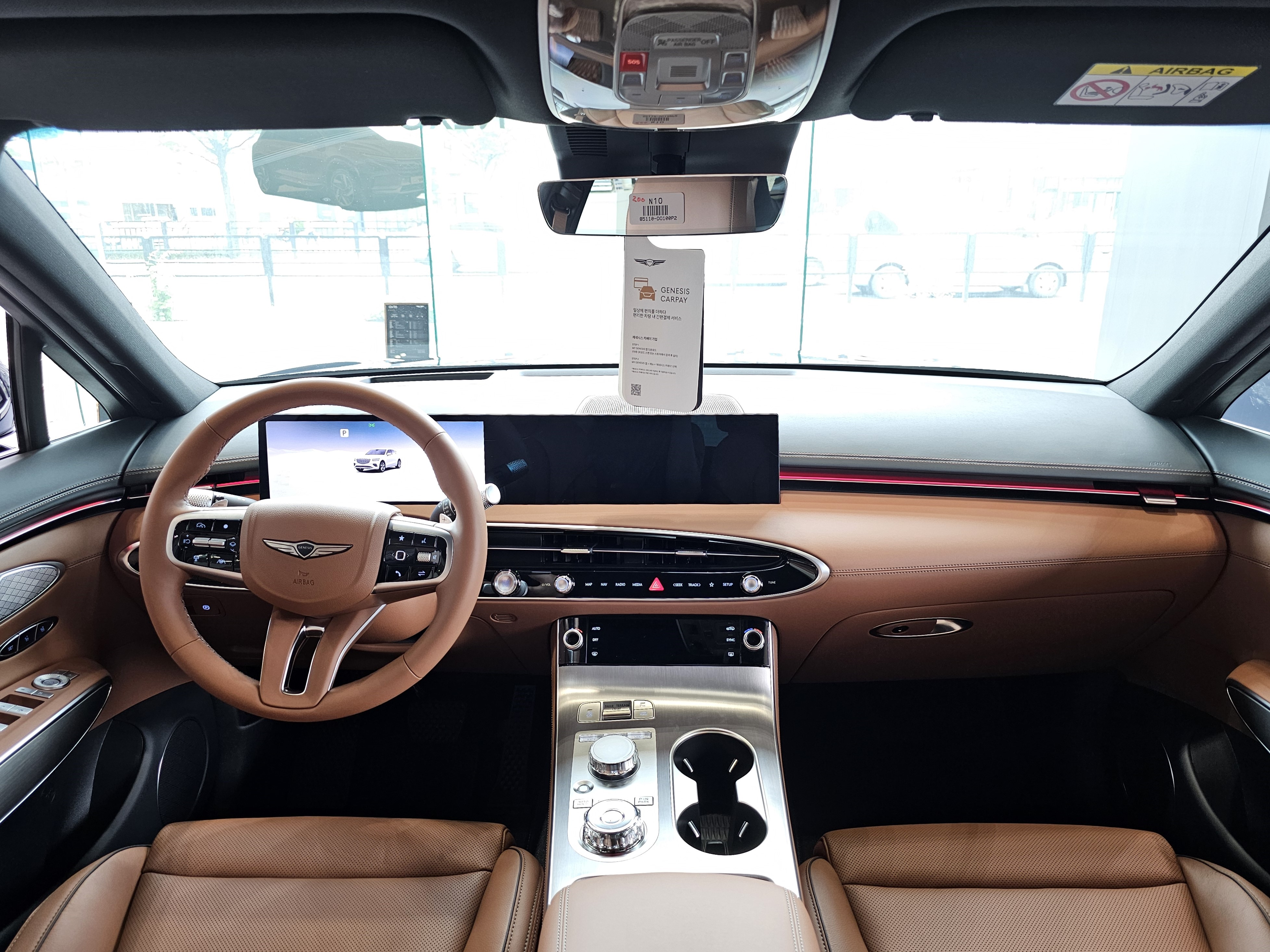
Interior

== Electrified GV70 ==
The Electrified GV70 (or the eGV70) is the battery electric version of the GV70. It was revealed at the Auto Guangzhou on November 19, 2021, and officially released on March 16, 2022. The Electrified GV70 features a dual motor setup with all wheel drive. According to Genesis, the Electrified GV70 can charge from 10% to 80% in 18 minutes using a 350 kW charger. It has 503 liters (17.8 cu ft) of the trunk and 22 liters (0.78 cu ft) of frunk capacity. A 12.3-inch cluster with a GUI dedicated to electric models was applied.

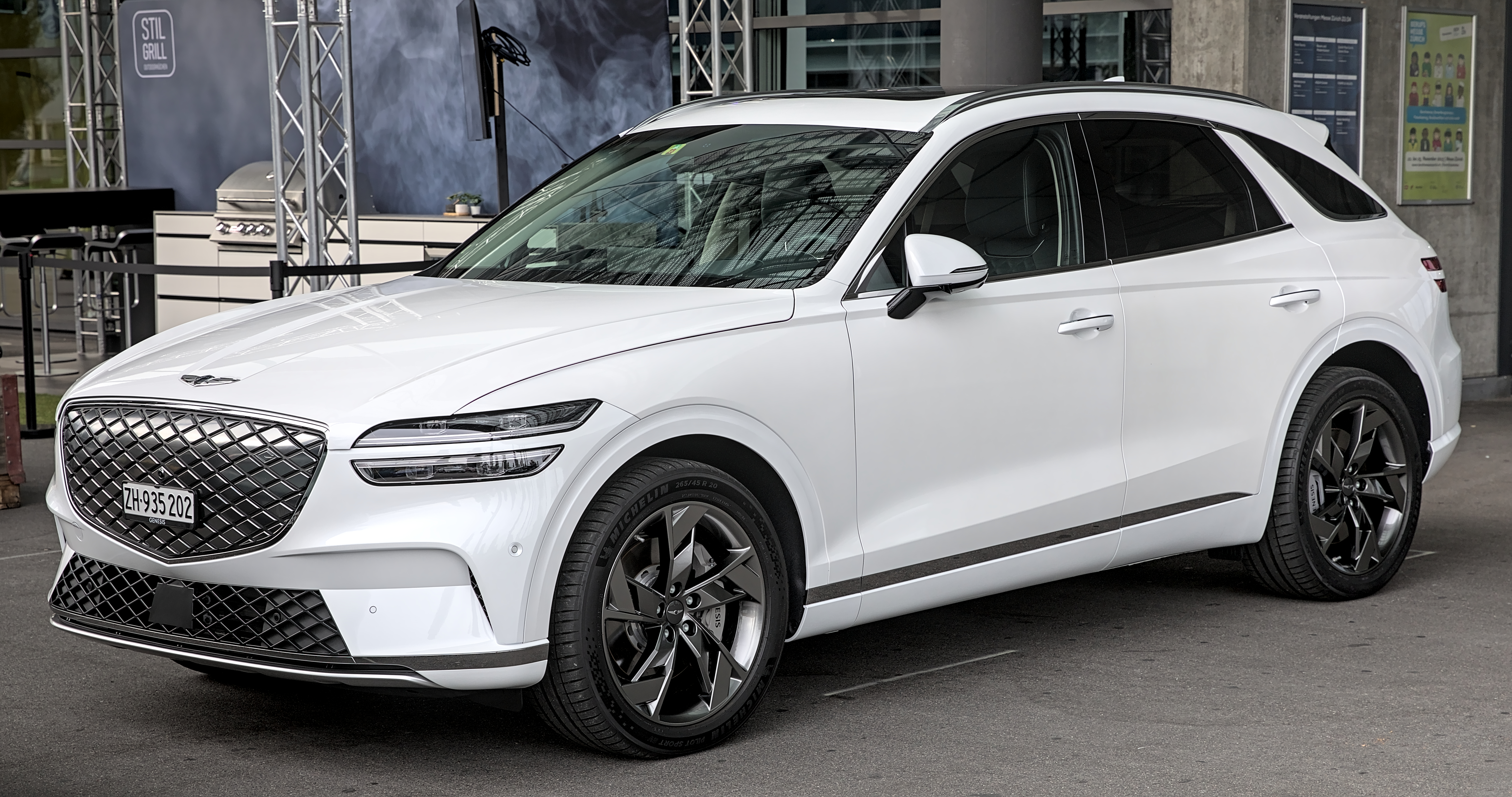
Electrified GV70

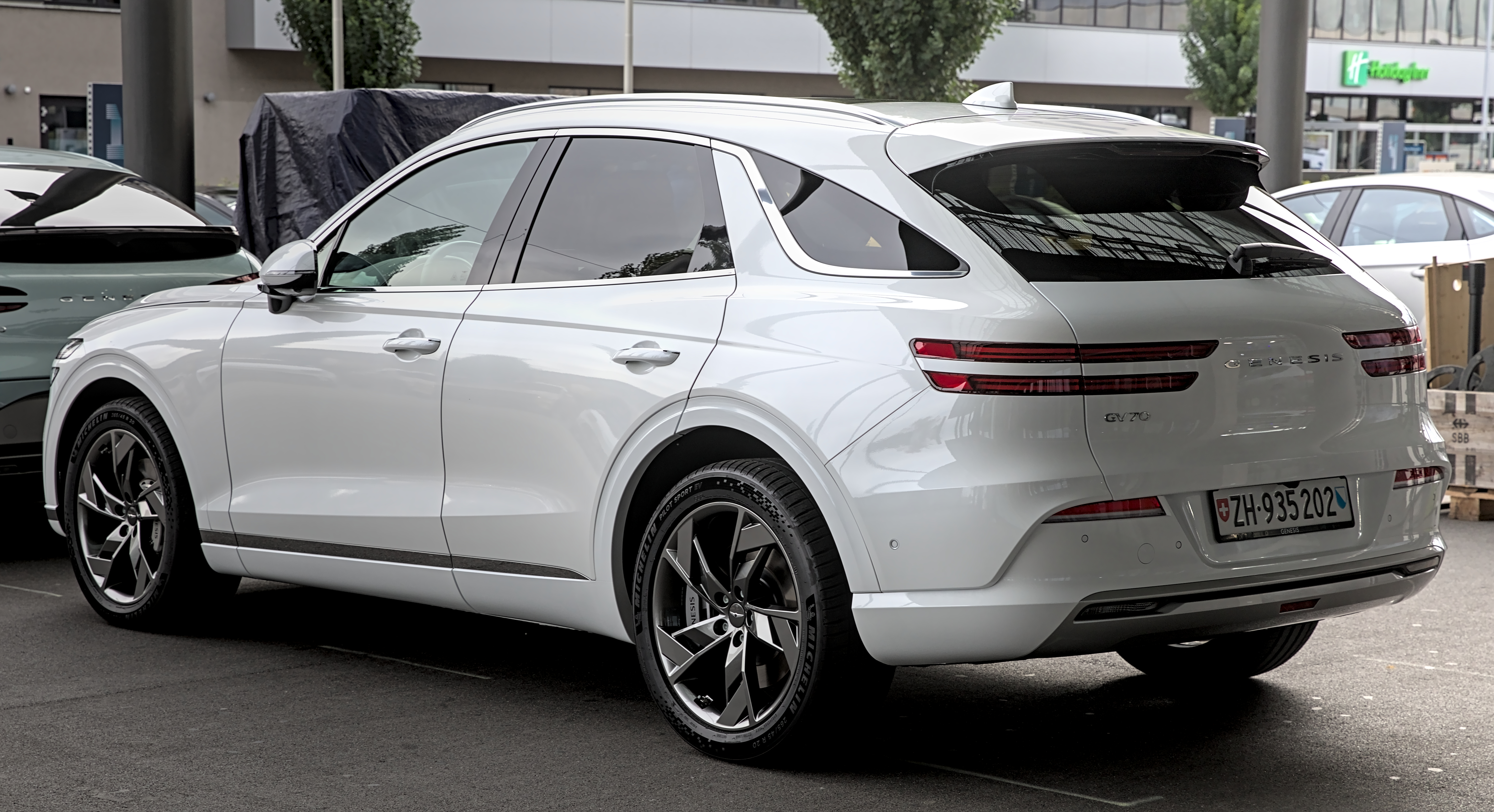
Electrified GV70

A refreshed version was unveiled on November 19, 2024. The refreshed model includes the changes brought by the refreshed petrol variant plus increasing the battery size from 77.4 kWh to 84 kWh and changing the charge port from CCS to NACS. Genesis will include a NACS to CCS adapter. The refreshed model will go on sale in the United States in early 2025 as a 2026 model year.

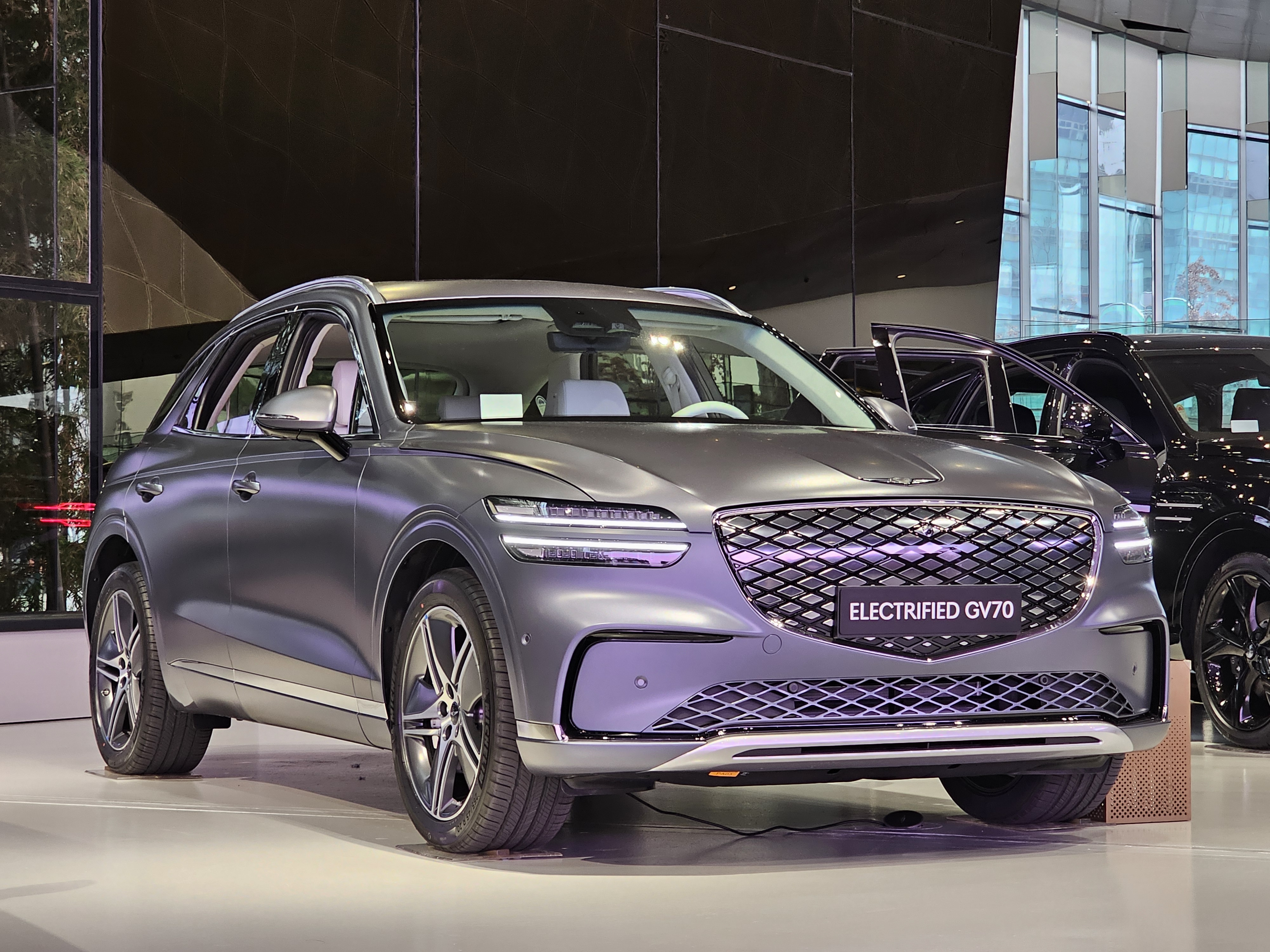
Electrified GV70 (2025)

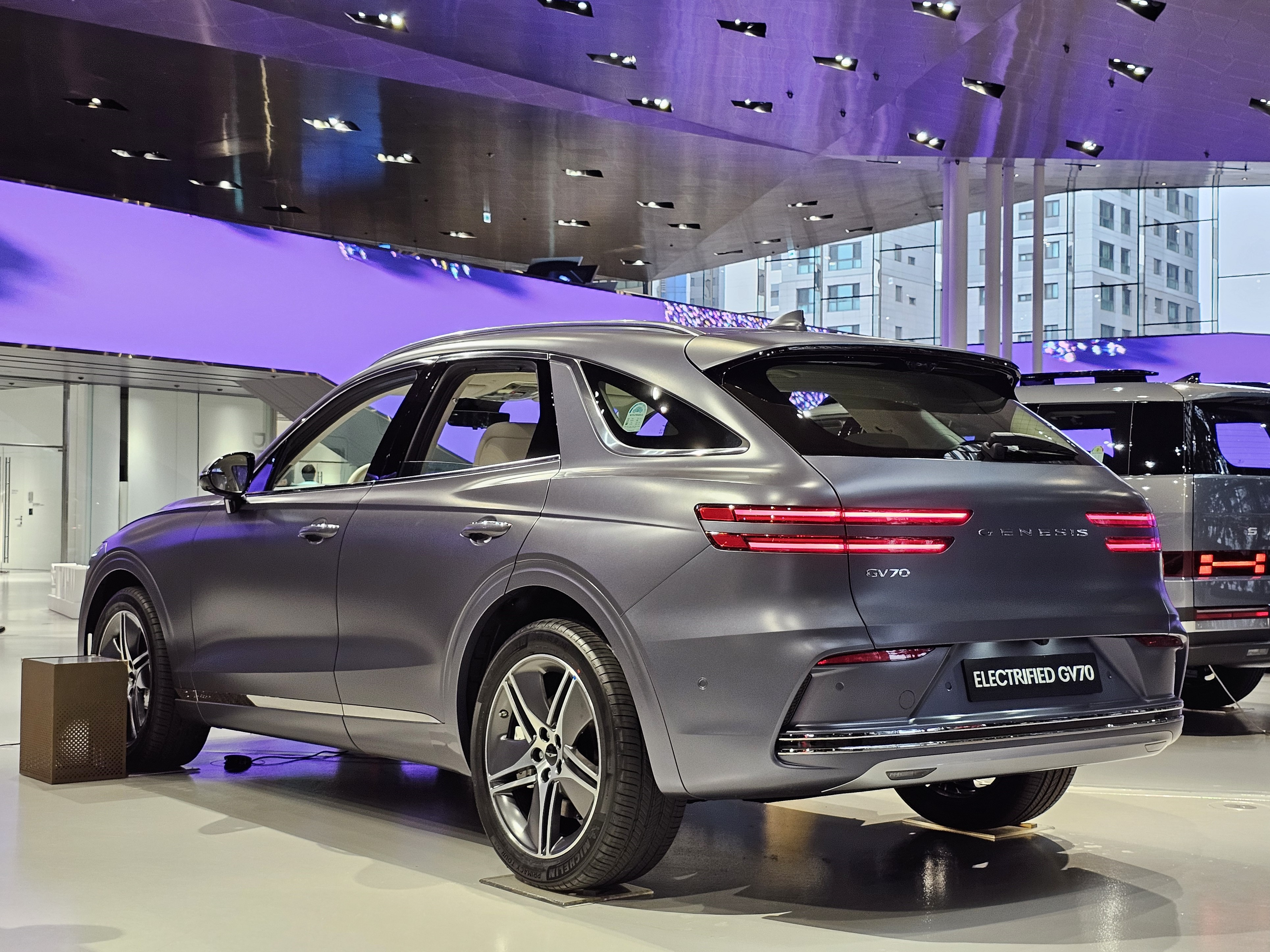
Rear View

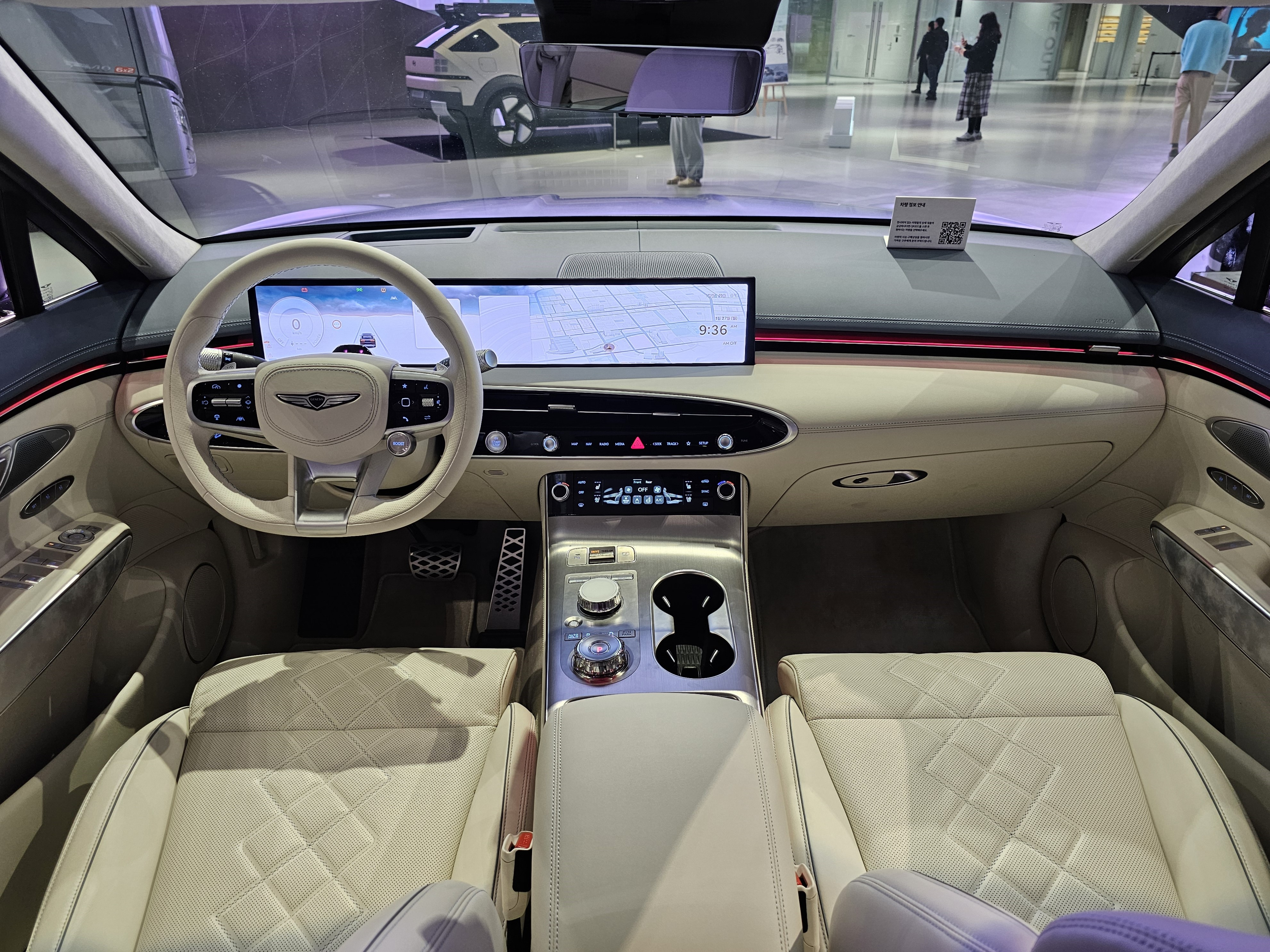
Interior

== Powertrain ==
GV70
Model	Transmission	Power	Torque	Acceleration 0–100 km/h (0–62 mph) (official)	Top Speed
Petrol
Smartstream G2.5 T-GDi	8-speed automatic	304 PS (224 kW; 300 hp) @ 5,800 rpm	43 kg⋅m (422 N⋅m; 311 lbf⋅ft) @ 1,650–4,000 rpm	6.1s	240 km/h (149 mph); 250 km/h (155 mph)
Smartstream G3.5 T-GDi	8-speed automatic	380 PS (279 kW; 375 hp) @ 5,800 rpm	54 kg⋅m (530 N⋅m; 391 lbf⋅ft) @ 1,300–4,500 rpm	5.1s	250 km/h (155 mph)
Diesel
Smartstream D2.2 CRDi	8-speed automatic	210 PS (154 kW; 207 hp) @ 3,800 rpm	45 kg⋅m (441 N⋅m; 325 lbf⋅ft) @ 1,750–2,750 rpm	7.9s	215 km/h (134 mph)

Electrified GV70
Battery	Years	Layout	Output	Torque	0–100 km/h (0–62 mph) (official)	Top Speed	Range
77.4 kWh	2022–2024	AWD	320 kW (435 PS; 429 hp)	700 N⋅m (71.4 kg⋅m; 516 lb⋅ft)	4.2 s	235 km/h (146 mph)	373–400 km (232–249 mi) (South Korea); 445–455 km (277–283 mi) (WLTP); 236 mi (380 km) (EPA)
84 kWh	2024–present	AWD	320 kW (435 PS; 429 hp)	700 N⋅m (71.4 kg⋅m; 516 lb⋅ft)	4.4 s	235 km/h (146 mph)	400–423 km (249–263 mi) (South Korea); 479 km (298 mi) (WLTP)

== Safety ==
IIHS:
Category	Rating
Small overlap front driver-side	Good
Small overlap front passenger-side	Good
Moderate overlap frontal offset	Good
Side impact	Good
Roof strength	Good (Note: Strength-to-weight ratio: 4.56)
Head restraints & seats	Good

Euro NCAP test results for a LHD, five door on a registration from 2021.

Test	Score	Points
Overall:	5/5 stars	134.9
Adult occupant:	89%	34.1
Child occupant:	87%	43
Pedestrian:	64%	43.8
Safety assist:	87%	14.0

ANCAP test results Genesis GV70 all variants (excluding 3.5 litre petrol) (2021, aligned with Euro NCAP)
Test	Points	%
Overall:	5 /5 stars	
Adult occupant:	34.11	89%
Child occupant:	43.62	89%
Pedestrian:	34.77	64%
Safety assist:	13.94	87%

== Awards ==
The GV70 won the 2022 Motor Trend SUV of the Year.

The GV70 won the 2023 & 2024 Car and Driver 10Best Trucks and SUVs

== Sales ==
GV70
Year	South Korea	U.S.	Canada	China	Global total
2020	98	—N/a	—N/a		118
2021	40,994	10,735	1,522		59,410
2022	26,545	19,141			52,880
2023	34,474	24,314	3,111	—	56,183
2024	33,983	26,944	4,048	8	73,564
2025				—	

GV70 EV
Year	South Korea	U.S.	Canada	China	Global total
2022	2,952	—N/a	—N/a		3,789
2023	2,159	1,674	487	84	3,657
2024	486	2,976	292	27	4,153
2025				12	
