= Volkswagen GTI =

Volkswagen uses GTI (Grand Tourer Injection) to designate variants of some of its models of cars.

The Volkswagen GTI models may refer to:

- Volkswagen Gol GTI, a performance-oriented B-segment/supermini/subcompact hatchback produced between 1989 and 2000
- Volkswagen Golf/Rabbit GTI, a performance-oriented C-segment/small family car/compact hatchback produced since 1976
- Volkswagen Lupo GTI, a performance-oriented A-segment/city car produced between 2000 and 2005
- Volkswagen Polo GTI, a performance-oriented B-segment/supermini/subcompact hatchback produced since 1995
- Volkswagen Scirocco GTI, a performance-oriented 2+2 coupé produced between 1976 and 1981
- Volkswagen Up GTI, a performance-oriented A-segment/city car produced between 2017 and 2023
- Volkswagen GTI Roadster Vision Gran Turismo, a concept car developed in 2014
