= Chrysler 300C =

The Chrysler Corporation has used the designation Chrysler 300C to refer to two separate unrelated vehicles from different eras:

- The 1957 Chrysler 300C is that year's version of the Chrysler 300 "letter series"; a large, high-performance luxury coupe sold in very limited numbers.
- The 2005 Chrysler 300C, launched in 2004, the top-of-the-line Chrysler 300, usually outfitted with a 5.7L Hemi V8 Magnum engine.
