= Hurtan =

Spanish automobile company

Hurtan Desarrollos S.L.
- Company type: Sociedad limitada
- Industry: Automotive
- Founded: 1991; 35 years ago
- Founder: Juan Hurtado González
- Headquarters: Santa Fe, Andalusia, Spain
- Products: Automobiles

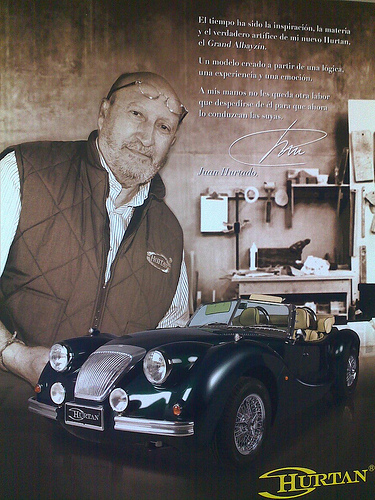
Founder Juan Hurtado and Hurtan Grand Albaycín.

Hurtan Desarrollos S.L., also known as Hurtan Automóviles, is a Spanish automobile company, founded in 1991 by Juan Hurtado González.

The company is based in Santa Fe, near Granada. It is an automobile manufacturer of retro-styled vehicles.

== Models ==
The company's models, inspired by classic sports cars of the 1950s and 1960s, include:

- Albaycín T2 – introduced 1992, 2 seat sports car.
- Albaycín T2+2 – introduced 1996, 4 seat sports car.
- Albaycín 2P – introduced 2004, sports car.
- Albaycín 4P – introduced 2006, roadster.
- Grand Albaycín – introduced 2008, sports car.
- Author – introduced 2017, luxury coupe.
- Route44 – introduced 2017, commercial vehicle, custom configured for different business types (e.g. foodtruck, mobile office or retail store).
- Vintage – introduced 2019, a Jeep Wrangler-based car with "1930s look".
- Grand Albaycin 30th Anniversary – introduced 2022, a Mazda MX-5 (ND)-based car.

=== Velántur Cars ===
Hurtan designed the retro−coupe bodies for the luxury electric Velántur Cars company, a joint venture of Retrofactory, another Hurtado family business, and Jofemar Corporation of Navarra. It will be the first 100% electric powered luxury vehicle produced in Spain. The battery electric vehicles will be manufactured at the former Santana Motor factory in Linares, in the Province of Jaén, Andalusia.

== Gallery ==
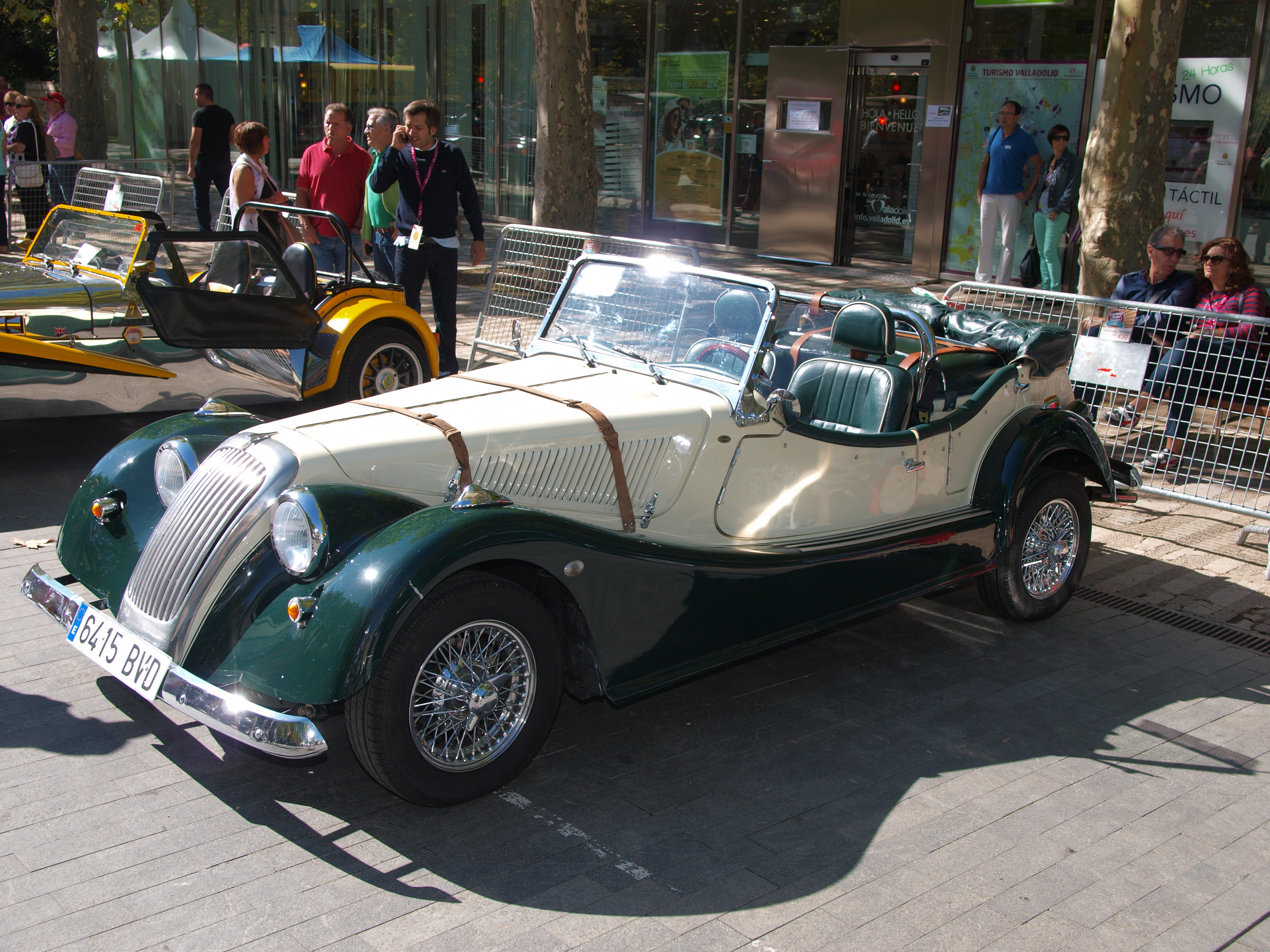
Hurtan Albaycín T2+2

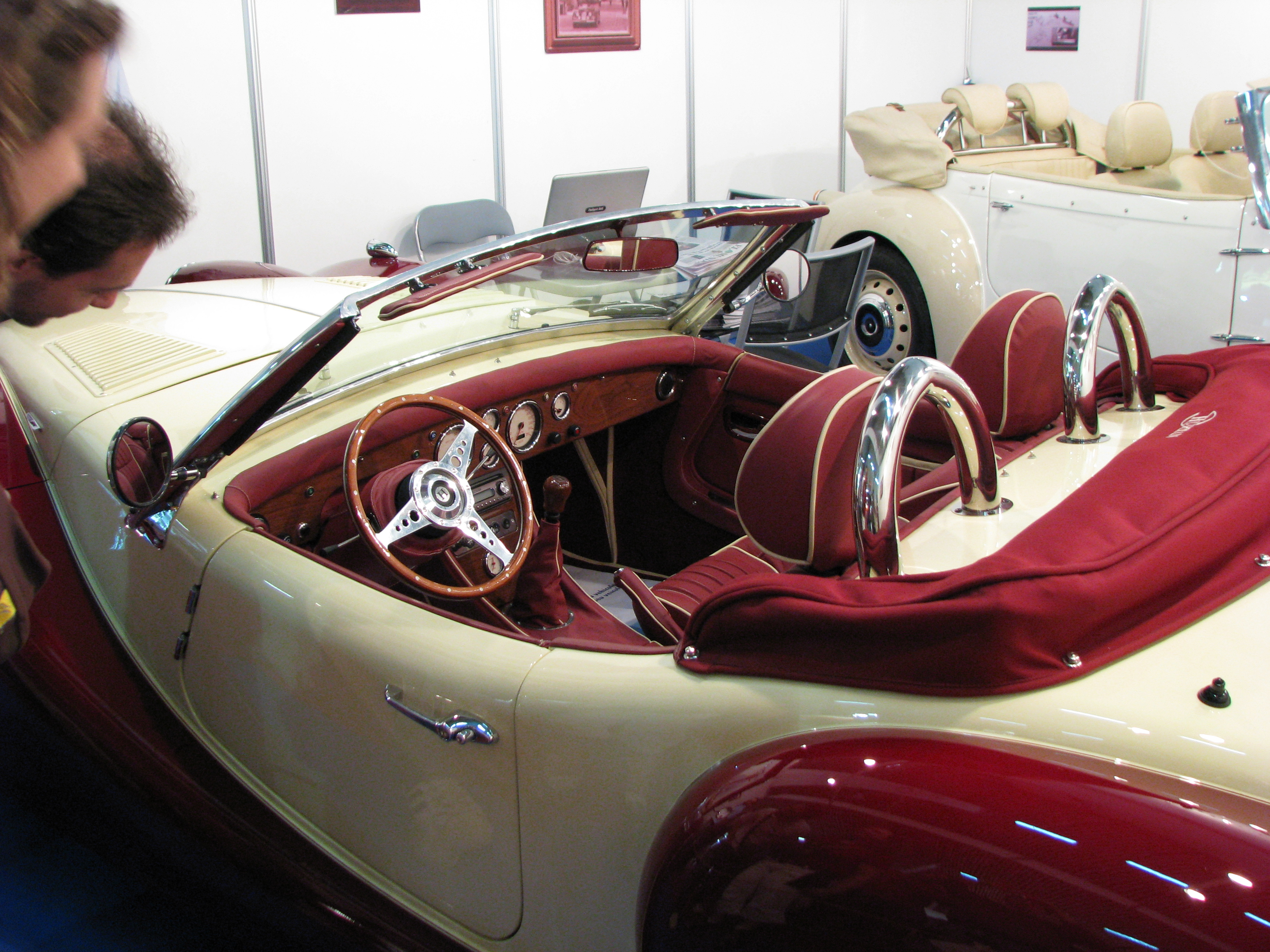
Hurtan Albaycín 2P, interior

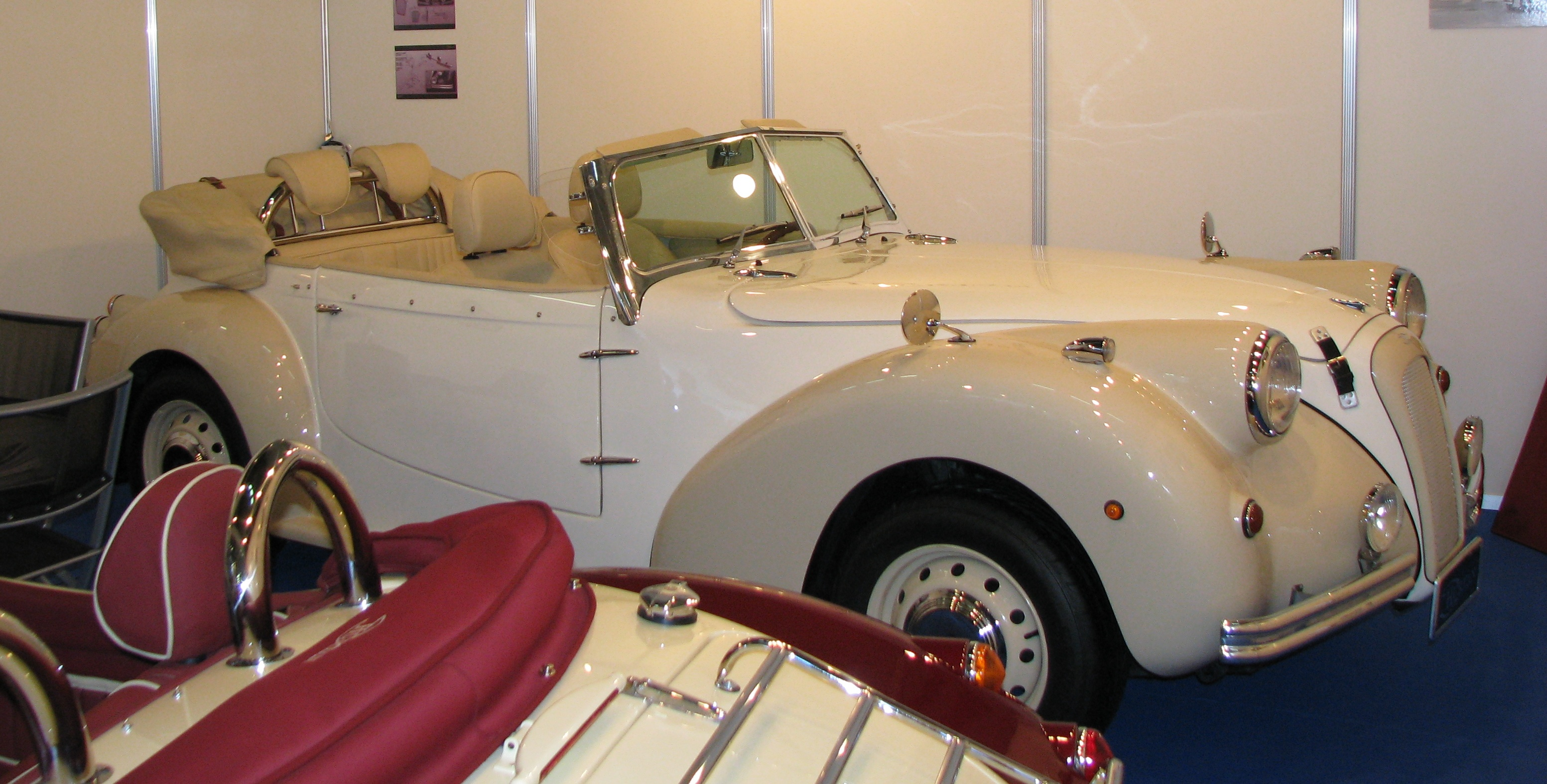
Hurtan Albaycín 4P

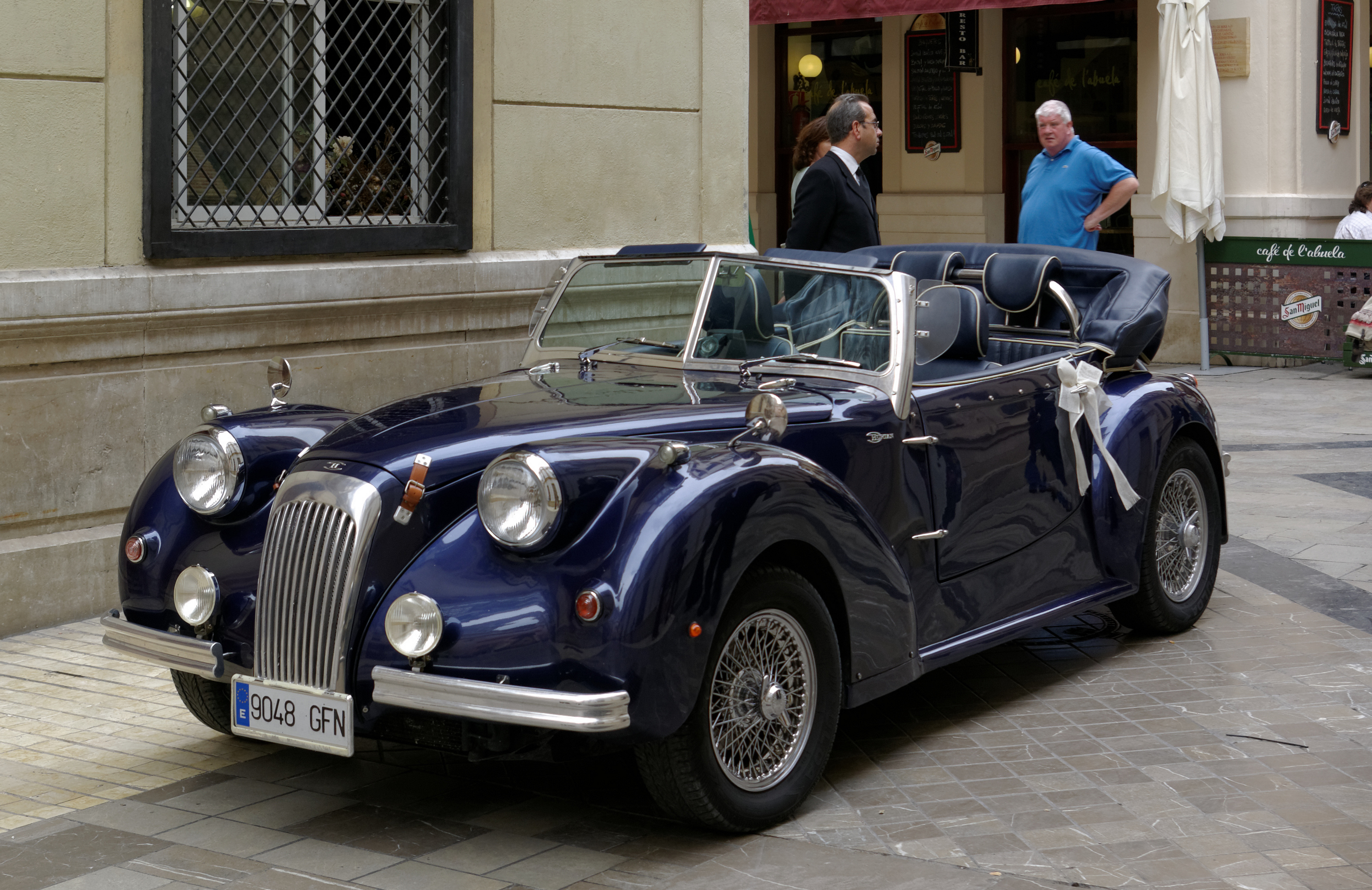
Hurtan Albaycín 4P
with top down

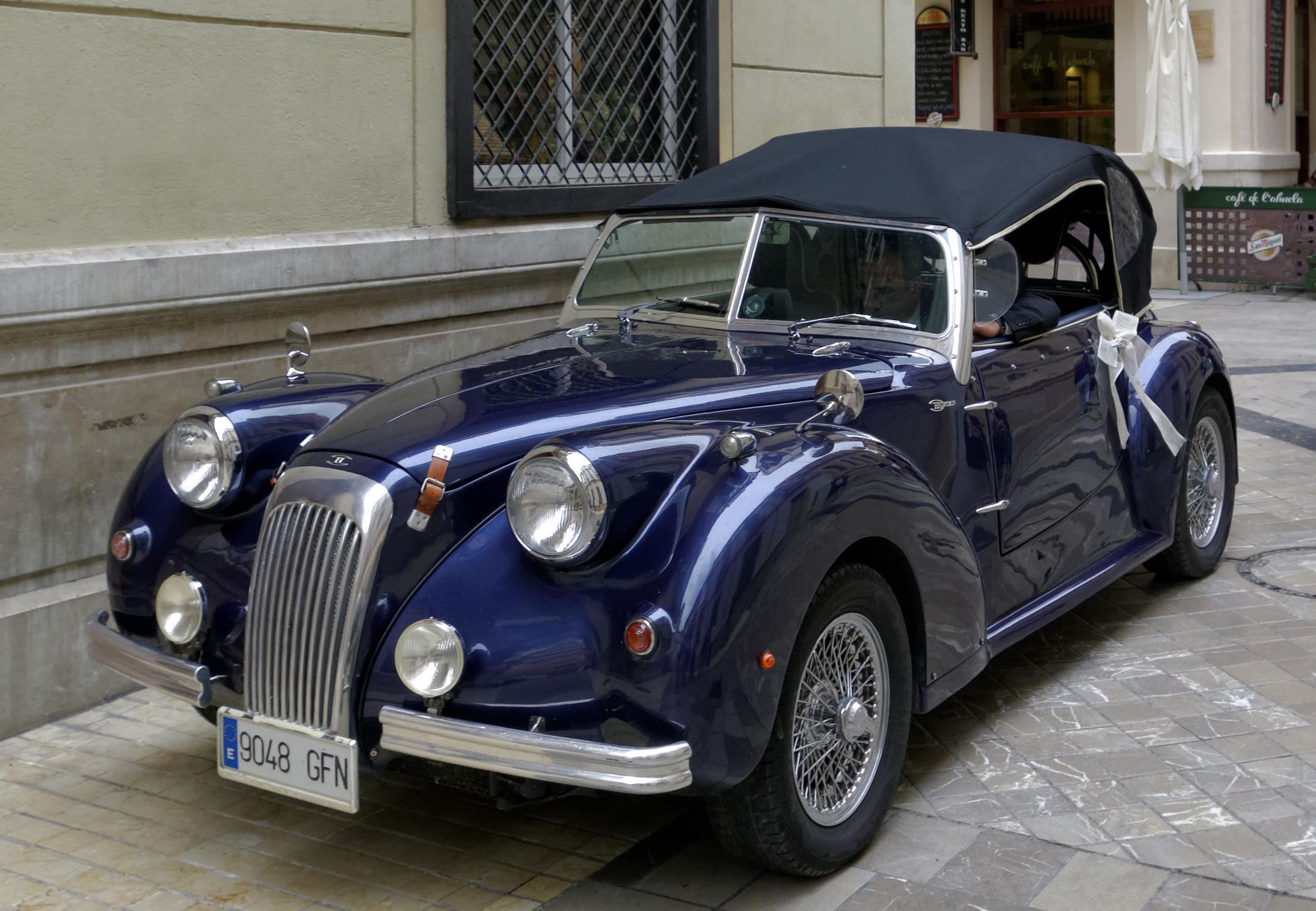
Hurtan Albaycín 4P with top up

== See also ==
- Retro-style automobiles
- Sports car manufacturers
