= Hurtan Grand Albaycín =

Light-weight convertible sports car

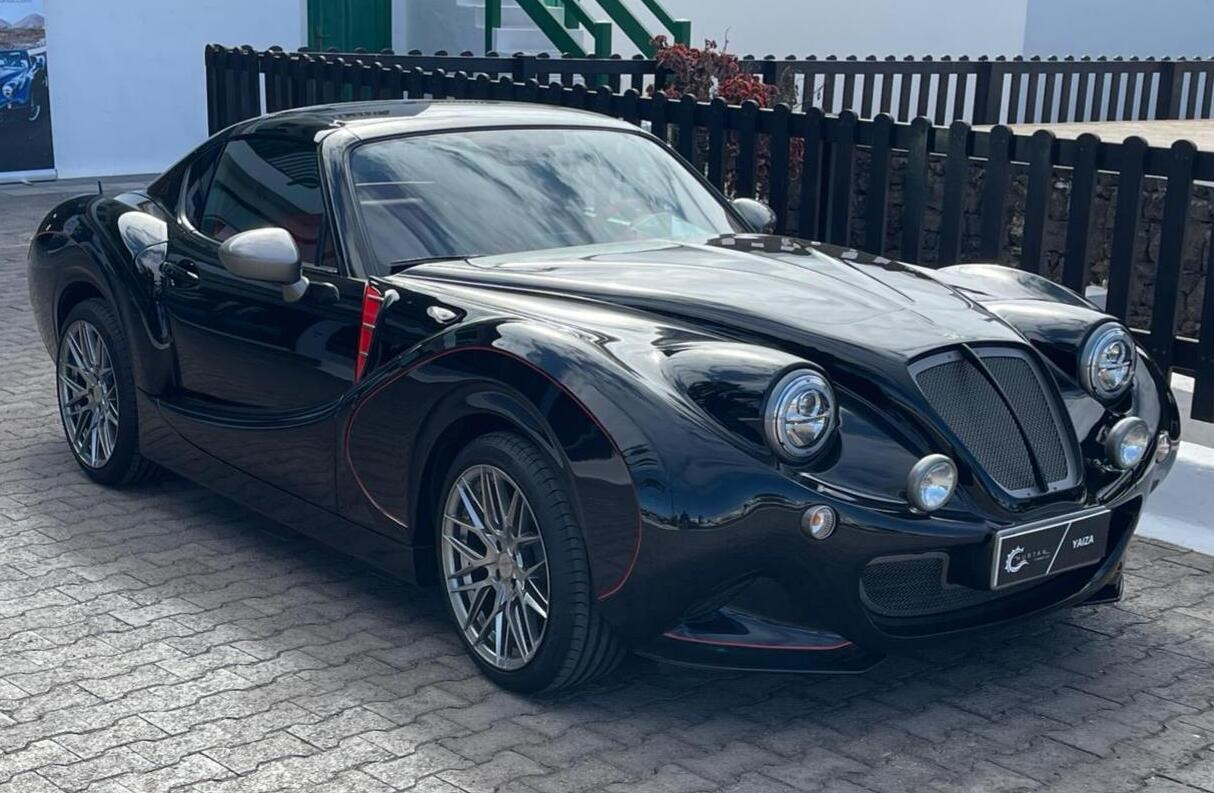

Overview
- Manufacturer: Hurtan
- Production: 2021–present

Body and chassis
- Class: Sports car (S)
- Body style: 2-door convertible
- Layout: Front mid-engine, rear-wheel-drive
- Platform: Mazda ND
- Related: Mazda MX-5 (ND)

Powertrain
- Engine: 1.5 L Skyactiv-G (P5-VPS) DOHC I4; 2.0 L Skyactiv-G (PE-VPS) DOHC I4
- Power output: 96 kW (129 hp; 131 PS) (1.5 L); 135 kW (181 hp; 184 PS) (2.0 L)
- Transmission: 6-speed Skyactiv-MT manual; 6-speed Skyactiv-Drive automatic

Dimensions
- Wheelbase: 2,310 mm (90.9 in)
- Length: 4,205 mm (165.6 in)
- Width: 1,820 mm (71.7 in)
- Height: 1,225 mm (48.2 in)
- Curb weight: 990–1,070 kg (2,182.6–2,358.9 lb)

The Hurtan Grand Albaycín is a retro-styled sports car produced by Spanish automobile company Hurtan.

== History ==
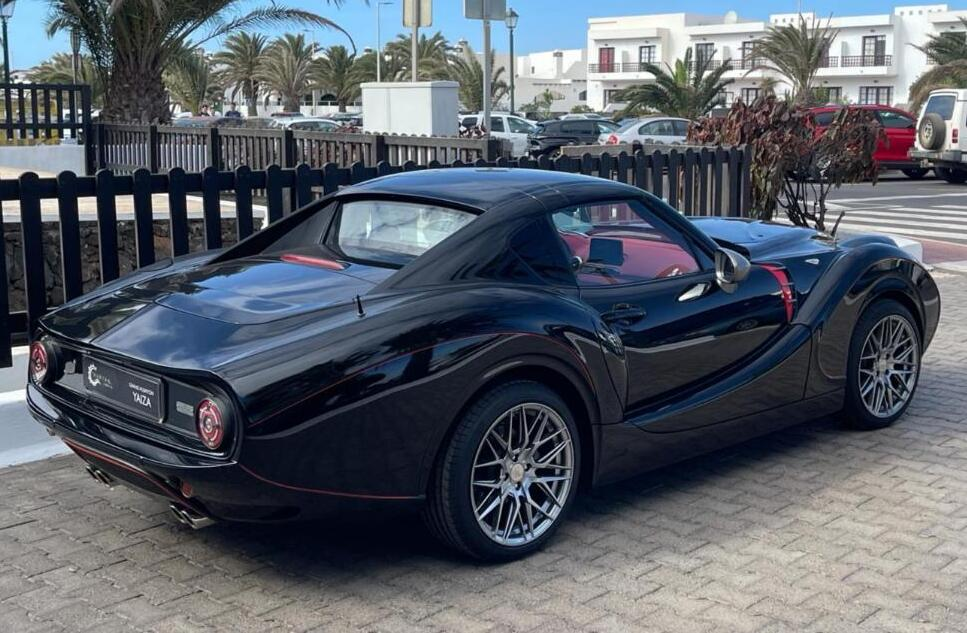
Hurtan Grand Albaycín rear

The Grand Albaycín, designed in the style of 1930s cars, was presented in January 2021. It was planned to initially be built in a special version limited to 30 units, which can be customized by buyers. Visually, the series can be ordered in the classic Heritage or the sporty Bespoke variant. The model is named after the oldest district of Granada, Albaicín. It is available in Europe and the United Arab Emirates.

== Specifications ==
Technically, the Grand Albaycín is based on the fourth generation Mazda MX-5. Like the MX-5, it is available as a roadster with a fabric top and as a Targa with a hardtop. In addition, both the 97 kW (132 hp) 1.5-liter gasoline engine and the 135 kW (184 hp) 2.0-liter gasoline engine are available. Maintenance and warranty are not provided by Hurtan, but directly by Mazda. Since the Grand Albaycín has been newly homologated, it is not listed as a Mazda in registration statistics.
