= Mazda MX-5 (ND) =

Lightweight convertible sports car

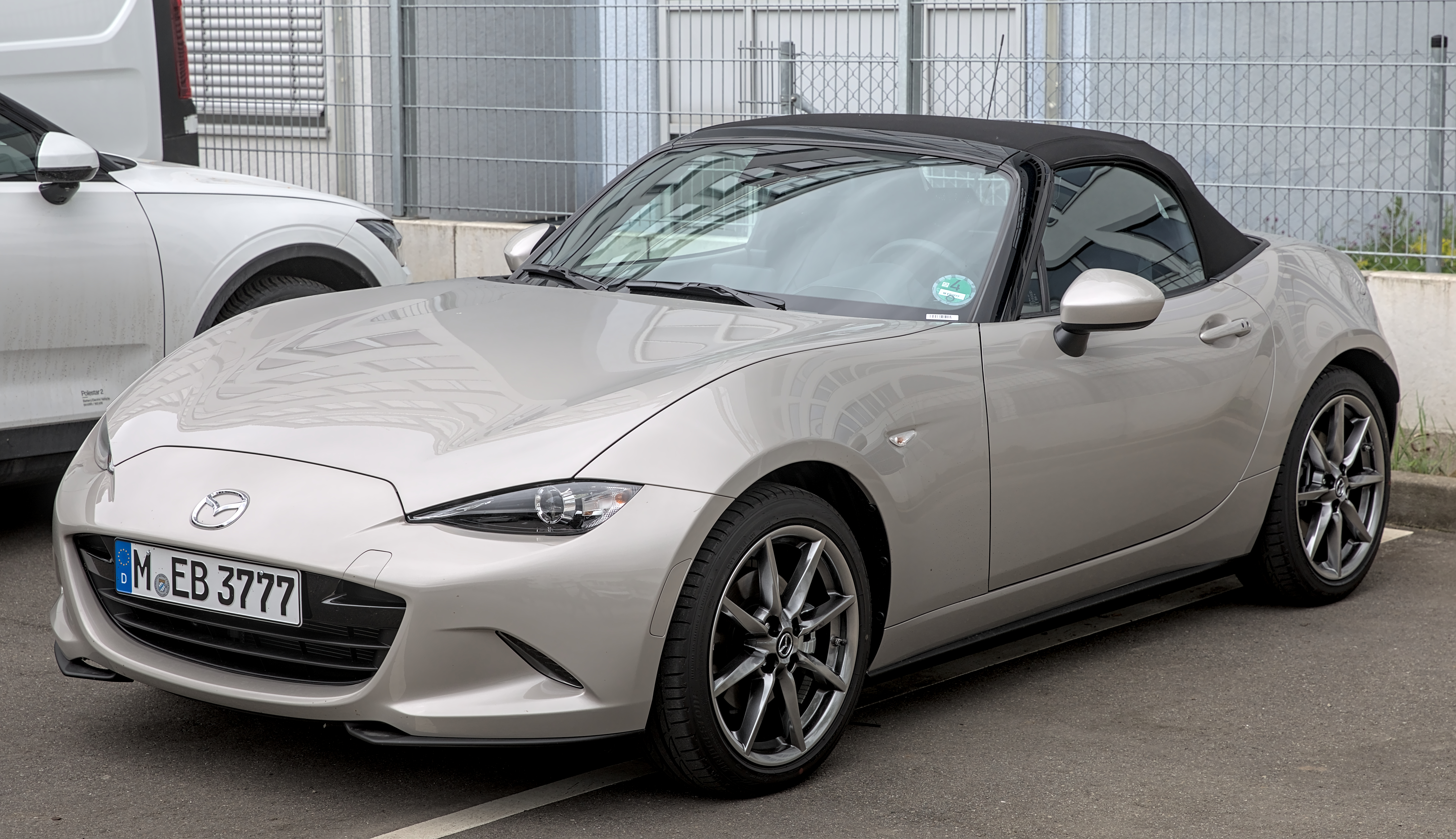

Overview
- Manufacturer: Mazda
- Model code: ND
- Also called: Mazda Roadster (Japan); Mazda MX-5 Miata (North America)
- Production: March 2015 – present
- Model years: 2016–present (North America)
- Assembly: Japan: Hiroshima (Ujina Plant No. 1)
- Designer: Masashi Nakayama

Body and chassis
- Class: Sports car (S)
- Body style: 2-door convertible; 2-door retractable fastback
- Layout: Front mid-engine, rear-wheel-drive
- Platform: Mazda N platform
- Related: Fiat 124 Spider (2016); Mitsuoka Himiko; Mitsuoka Rock Star; Hurtan Grand Albaycín

Powertrain
- Engine: 1.5 L Skyactiv-G (P5-VPS) DOHC I4; 2.0 L Skyactiv-G (PE-VPS) DOHC I4
- Power output: 96 kW (129 hp; 131 PS) (1.5 L); 118 kW (158 hp; 160 PS) (2.0 L); 135 kW (181 hp; 184 PS) (2.0 L)
- Transmission: 6-speed Skyactiv-MT manual; 6-speed Skyactiv-Drive automatic

Dimensions
- Wheelbase: 2,310 mm (90.9 in)
- Length: 3,915 mm (154.1 in)
- Width: 1,730 mm (68.1 in)
- Height: 1,235 mm (48.6 in)
- Curb weight: ND1 1.5 MT Basic(S/Sport): 990 kg (2,183 lb); ND2 /ND3: + 8 kg (18 lb); Automatic: + 20 kg (44 lb); RF : + 50 kg (110 lb)

Chronology
- Predecessor: Mazda MX-5 (NC)

The fourth-generation Mazda MX-5, model code ND, is the current generation of the Mazda MX-5 roadster. The car has been manufactured in Mazda's Hiroshima plant since 4 March 2015.

Mazda officially unveiled the car on 3 September 2014, in the United States and Spain, and on 4 September 2014, in Japan. It was presented at the 2014 Paris Motor Show in October that year, and at the 2014 Los Angeles Auto Show in November. The vehicle was released in the third quarter of 2015. In the US, the list price of the MX-5 was between $24,915 and $30,065. On 24 March 2016, the MX-5 was awarded World Car of the Year (WCOTY) and the World Car Design of the Year at the New York International Auto Show, being the second Mazda to win WCOTY following the Mazda2 in 2008.

== Overview ==
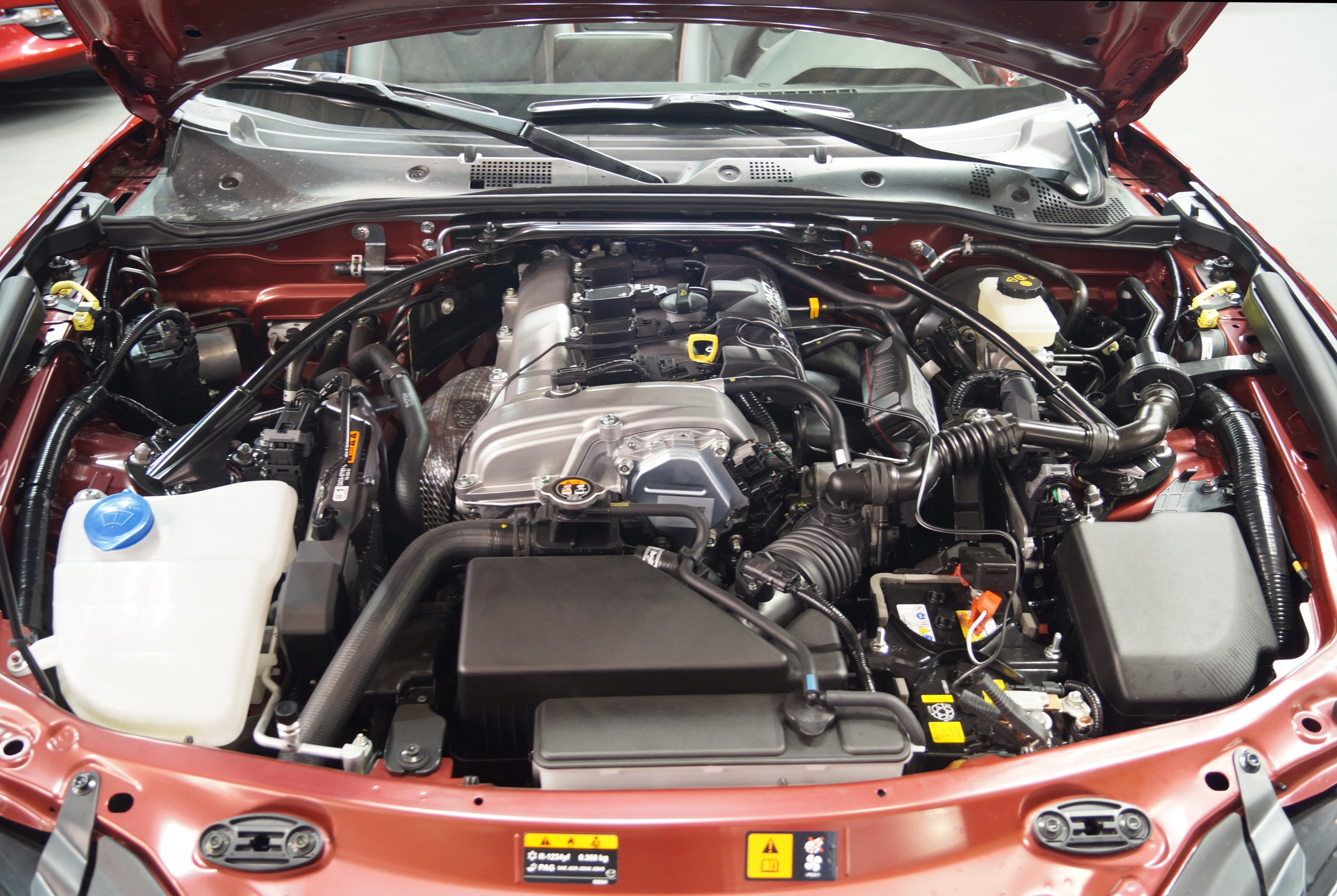
The MX-5's 2.0 L Skyactiv-G engine

The fourth-generation MX-5 is 105 mm (4 inches) shorter and 100 kg (220 lb) lighter than its predecessor, putting the vehicle's curb weight near 1,000 kg (2,200 lb). Incorporating Mazda's Skyactiv technology, the MX-5 is offered with two naturally aspirated direct-injection petrol engines. The base model has a 1.5 L 96 kW (129 hp; 131 PS) engine, while pre-2019 American and Canadian-market models with a 1,998 cc (2.0 L; 121.9 cu in) engine are rated at 116 kW (155 hp; 157 PS) at 6000 rpm and 201 N⋅m (148 lb⋅ft) of torque at 4600 rpm. Mazda also replaced the hydraulic power steering system in previous MX-5s with their new Electric Power Assisted Steering (EPAS) system.

The car was launched with a six-speed manual transmission and a six-speed automatic transmission. The cockpit, steering wheel, and infotainment system are very similar to those in the 2014 Mazda3. The MX-5 is fitted as standard with a manually operated fabric roof that can be opened or closed within a few seconds.

Die-cast toy car brands like Tomica, Hot Wheels, and Matchbox have made versions of the fourth-generation MX-5.

In 2024, the 2.0 L model was discontinued in Europe due to stricter emissions regulations. Due to derogation timings, the 2.0 L model will continue to be sold in the UK until January 2027.

=== MX-5 RF ===
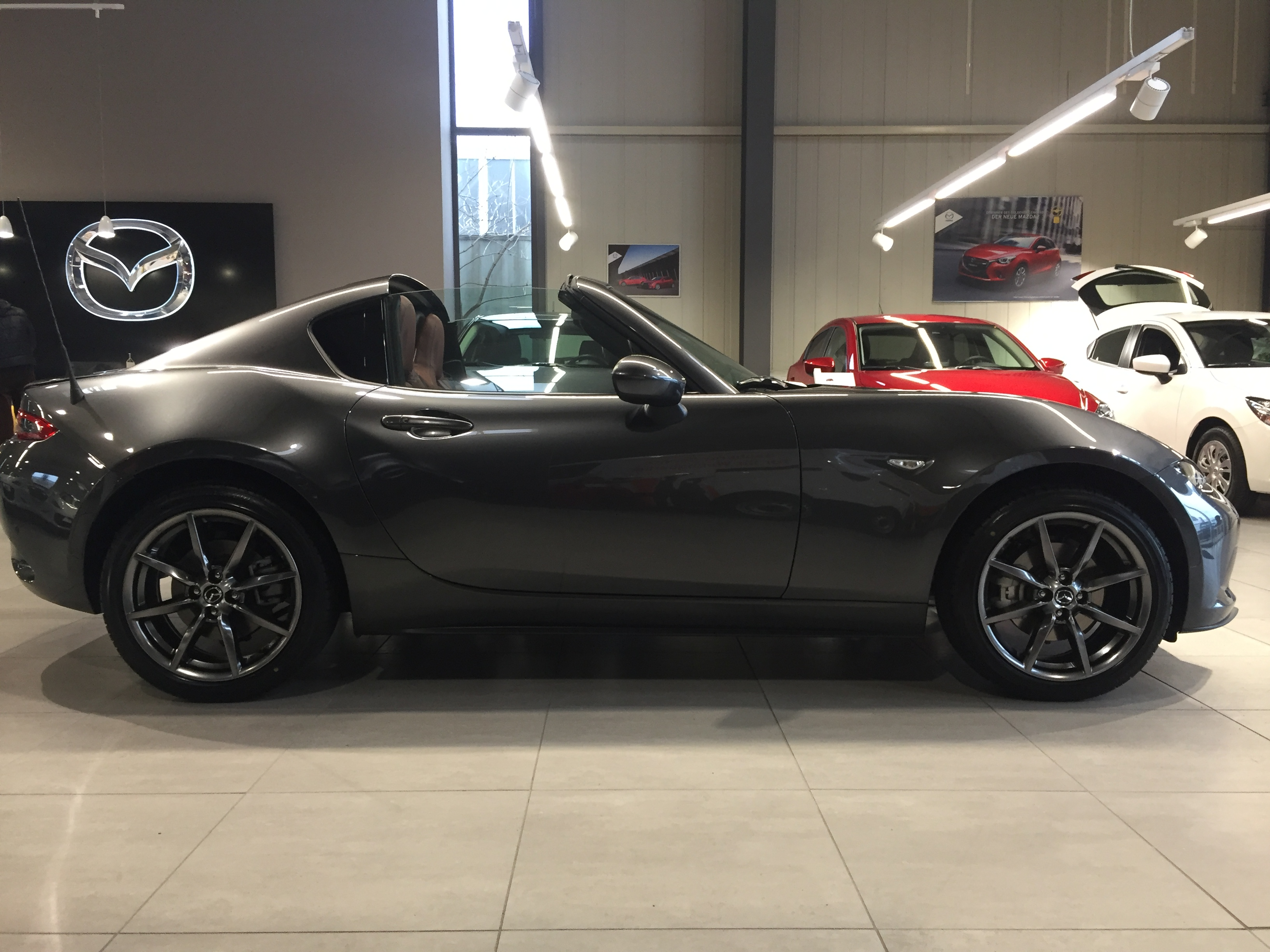
The targa-style greenhouse of the MX-5 RF

In late 2016, a new MX-5 RF (Retractable Fastback) model was announced. It features a rigid roof and buttresses that give the car a more coupé-like silhouette than the soft top convertible. The whole of the rear tunnel roof, including the buttresses, lifts up and back to allow the top (targa top) panel of the roof to fold back and down behind the seats. The tunnel roof, including the buttresses, then moves back into place. Rollover protection is provided by roll hoops behind the seats.

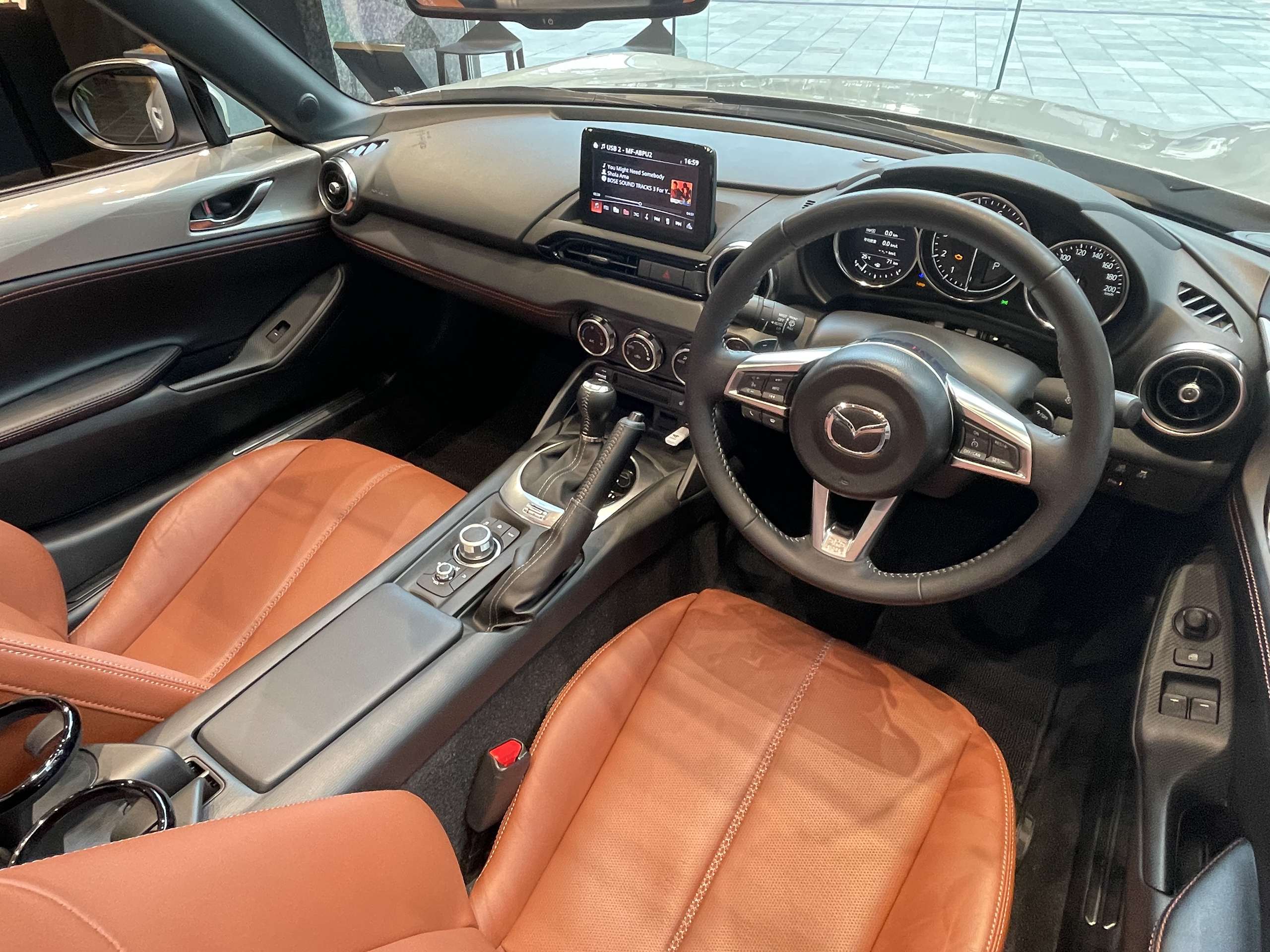
Interior

The interior of the RF is almost identical to that of the standard MX-5; differences include a full-colour circular digital gauge in place of the standard model's semi-rectangular half-digital monochrome display. The storage cubby behind the driver's seat has been eliminated, and the cubby behind the passenger seat as well as the glove box behind the center console have been made shallower to make room for the roof mechanism. The MX-5 RF uses the same engines as the standard model and offers similar performance. The MX-5 RF also introduced a new 'Machine Grey Mica' paint colour.

A limited edition run of 500 models was introduced with the launch of the Mazda MX-5 RF. Called the 'Launch Edition' these models were priced at £28,995 and were only available with the 118 kW (158 hp; 160 PS) 2.0-litre engine. These models included BBS alloy wheels, a twin-tone roof, black door mirrors and rear spoiler as well as Recaro seats. This version was only available in two colours: 'Soul Red' or 'Machine Grey'. It was the first time since the original NA series MX-5 was available with a companion body style since the Mazda MX-3, which was a liftback sport coupe.

=== 2018 update ===
In late 2018, for the 2019 model year, the 2.0-litre engine was revised to generate 135 kW (181 hp; 184 PS) and 205 N⋅m (151 lb⋅ft) of torque, with the redline increased to 7,500 rpm, and a dual-mass flywheel was introduced to the powertrain. Externally, the car received a burgundy soft top and black 17-inch wheels. Interior upgrades include a telescoping steering column, a standard reverse camera, a reworked door opening mechanism, revised seat controls, and redesigned cupholders.

In North America, the 2019 MX-5 has three variants, called Sport, Club, and Grand Touring in the US (GS, GS-P, and GT in Canada, respectively); all come with a 1,998 cc (2.0 L; 121.9 cu in) engine rated at 135 kW (181 hp; 184 PS) at 7,000 rpm and 205 N⋅m (151 lb⋅ft) at 4000 rpm of torque. All come with a manual or automatic transmission, with the manual having a claimed fuel efficiency of 9.0 L/100 km (31.4 mpg_{‑imp}; 26.1 mpg_{‑US}) in city driving and 7.0 L/100 km (40.4 mpg_{‑imp}; 33.6 mpg_{‑US}) on highways. The automatic performs slightly better, at 9.0 L/100 km (31.4 mpg_{‑imp}; 26.1 mpg_{‑US}) in the city and 6.6 L/100 km (42.8 mpg_{‑imp}; 35.6 mpg_{‑US}) on highways.

A GT-S trim was introduced in 2019 for the U.S., bringing the Club trim's limited-slip differential, Bilstein shock absorbers, and strut tower brace to the GT trim as well as a black roof on all hard-top models. In 2020, these became standard features in the GT trim, and the separate GT-S designation was retired.

=== 2021 update ===
In December 2021, Mazda said the 2022 MX-5 would improve steering and body roll during hard cornering by braking the inner rear wheel.

=== 2024 update ===
In February 2024, the ND3 received a new infotainment, new headlights with daytime running lamps and taillights with reverse lights, a new type of limited-slip differential, a revised steering rack, and a minor facelift. A 'dynamic stability control - track' mode could be enabled to partially disable the stability control and let the car achieve higher slip angles.

On 3 June 2024, the Japanese-market Roadster RF delivery was suspended when it was found to have rewritten engine control software during power output tests. Deliveries of the Roadster RF resumed on 28 June 2024, following compliance with safety regulations and type approval.

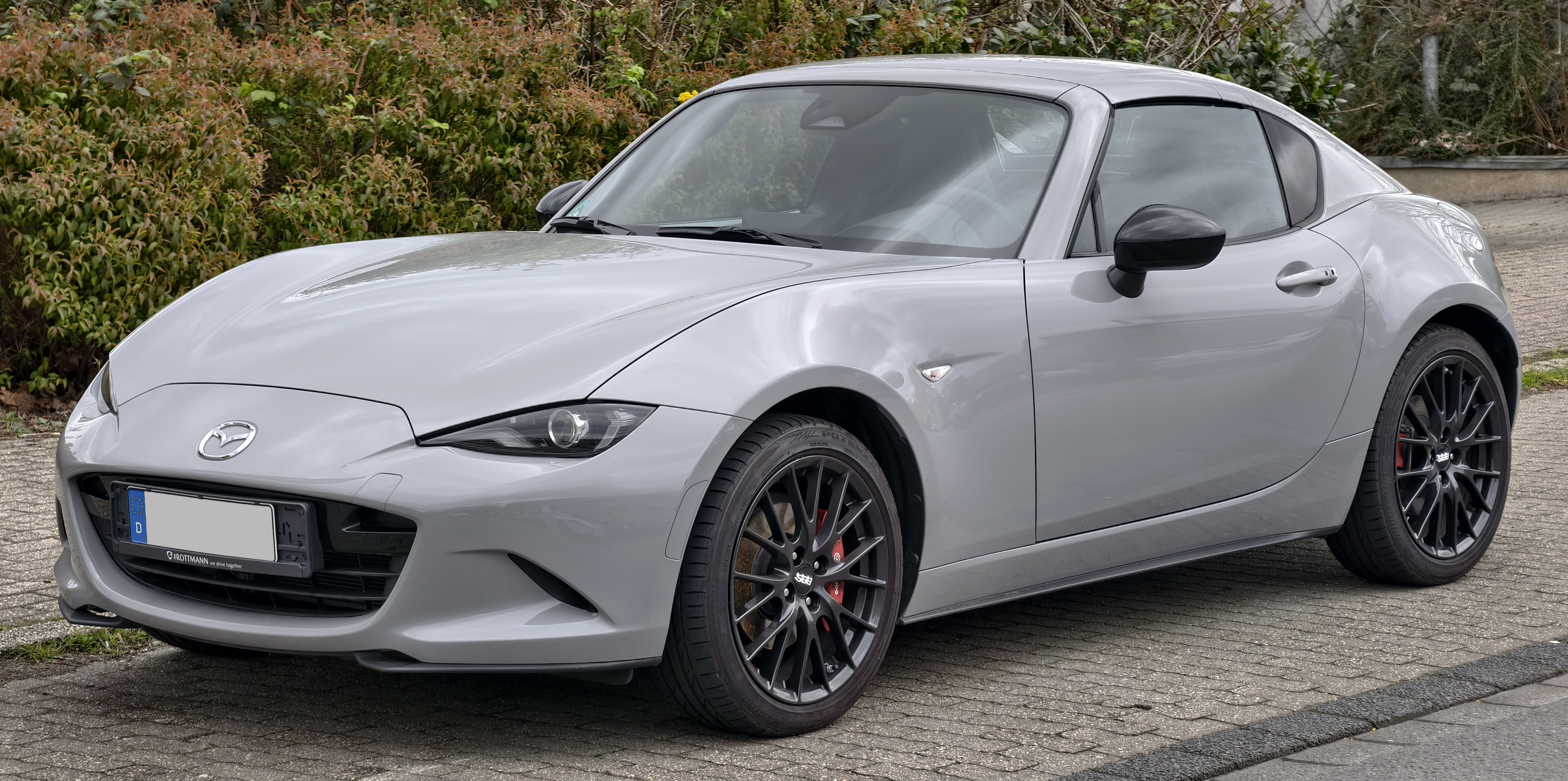
2025 Mazda MX-5 RF (front)

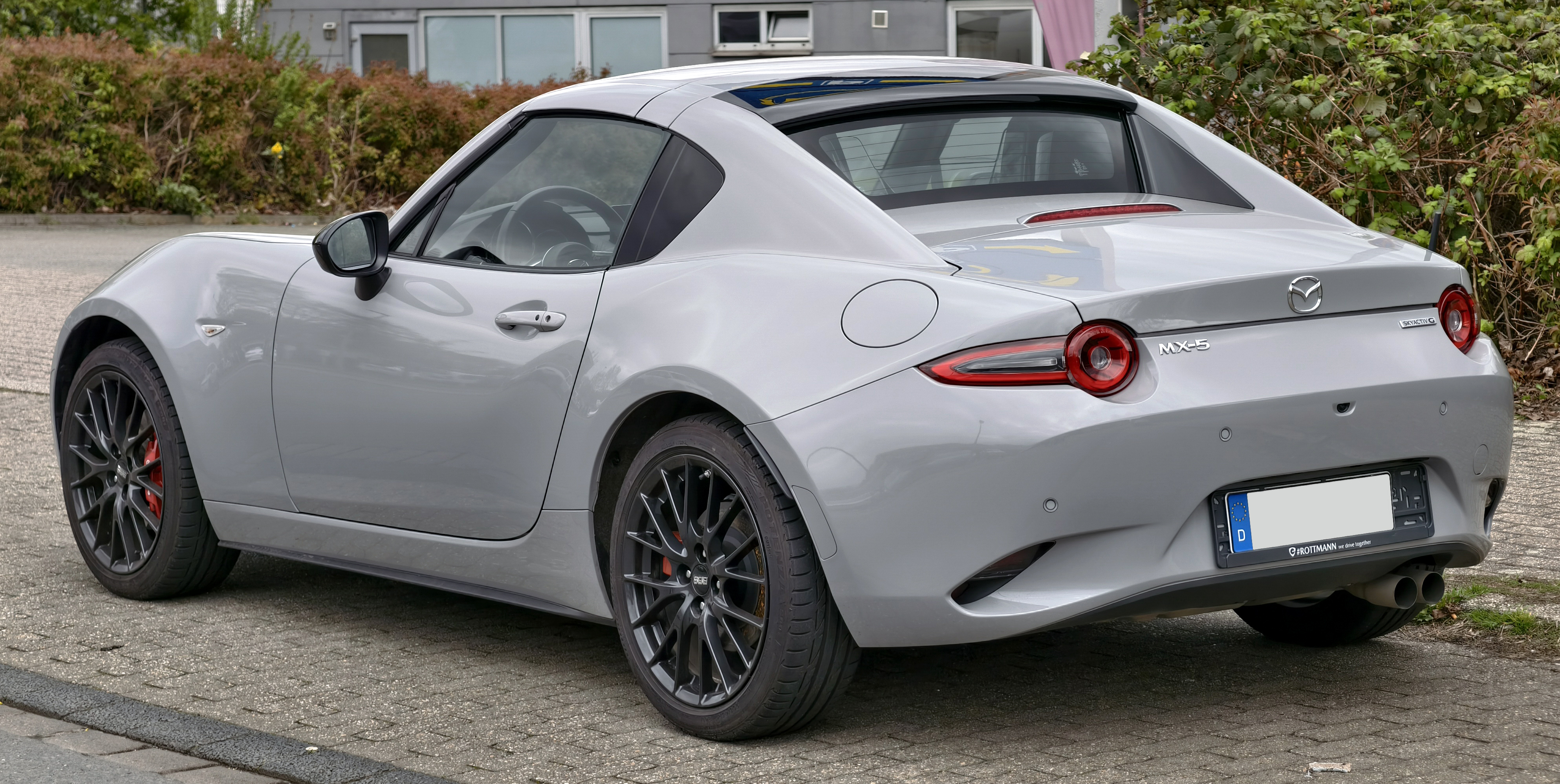
2025 Mazda MX-5 RF (rear)

== Cooperation with Fiat Chrysler ==
A joint venture with Alfa Romeo on a joint rear-wheel drive platform was announced in 2012, but cancelled in 2014. Fiat Chrysler later announced the Fiat 124 Spider and Abarth 124 Spider, both based on the Mazda ND platform, in 2015. Primary differences from the Mazda was a 1.4 litre, turbocharged engine with 127 kW (170 hp) and distinctive front and rear lights.

In 2016, The Detroit News stated that "in partnering with Mazda’s MX-5 Miata to resurrect the classic Fiat 124 Spider, Fiat Chrysler not only gained a halo sports car for its struggling Italian brand, but likely saved the most celebrated small sports car of the past 25 years (the MX-5)" — citing the markedly increased cost of developing a new car at the time and "the costliest wave of government regulation since the 1970s."

== Special editions ==
=== Mazda MX-5 Icon (2016) ===
Based on a 1.5-l SE-L model, the Icon was released in the UK as the fourth MX-5 to wear the "Icon" badge (the others were 2000, 2005 and 2007 models). The interior features red stitching, special floor mats, and a plaque on the centre console. It was available in Meteor Grey Mica or Crystal White Pearlescent and featured chequered decals along the sides along with Soul Red paint on the front air dam, mirror caps and spoiler, finished with 16-inch gunmetal alloy wheels. Production was limited to 600 cars.

=== Mazda MX-5 Levanto (2016) ===
Inspired by the 1966 film The Endless Summer, this one-off collaboration with Garage Italia Customs features a unique indigo blue and bright orange gradient paint job. In addition, the interior has been reupholstered in Japanese blue denim with blue Alcantara and orange stitching.

=== Mazda MX-5 Z-Sport (2018) ===
The Z-Sport is characterized by its exclusive combination of 17-inch BBS alloy wheels, Machine Grey paint, and a cherry-red soft top. It also came with sand-coloured leather upholstery, a numbered "Z-Sport" dashboard plaque, and "Z-Sport" logos on the door sills and floor mats. It is essentially the same as a Sports Nav 2.0 model, with additions available on the upgrade list.

=== Mazda MX-5 Yamamoto Signature (2018) ===
This Italy-exclusive model was a tribute to Mazda MX-5 Ambassador Nobuhiro Yamamoto and was only available with the 1.5 L engine and in Jet Black with red highlights. It is equipped with a Mazdaspeed aero kit, a red engine bay brace and oil cap, and a special badge on the driver's side door behind the side mirror. The interior features black and red Alcantara trim with an embroidered reproduction of Yamamoto's signature. Optional upgrades include Öhlins suspension, Toyo R888R 205/50ZR16 semi-slick tyres on 16-inch Enkei RPF1 wheels, 280 mm brake discs with Brembo 4-piston front calipers, Nissin rear calipers, and stainless steel braided hoses. Only four examples of this model were released.

=== Mazda MX-5 30th Anniversary Edition (2019) ===
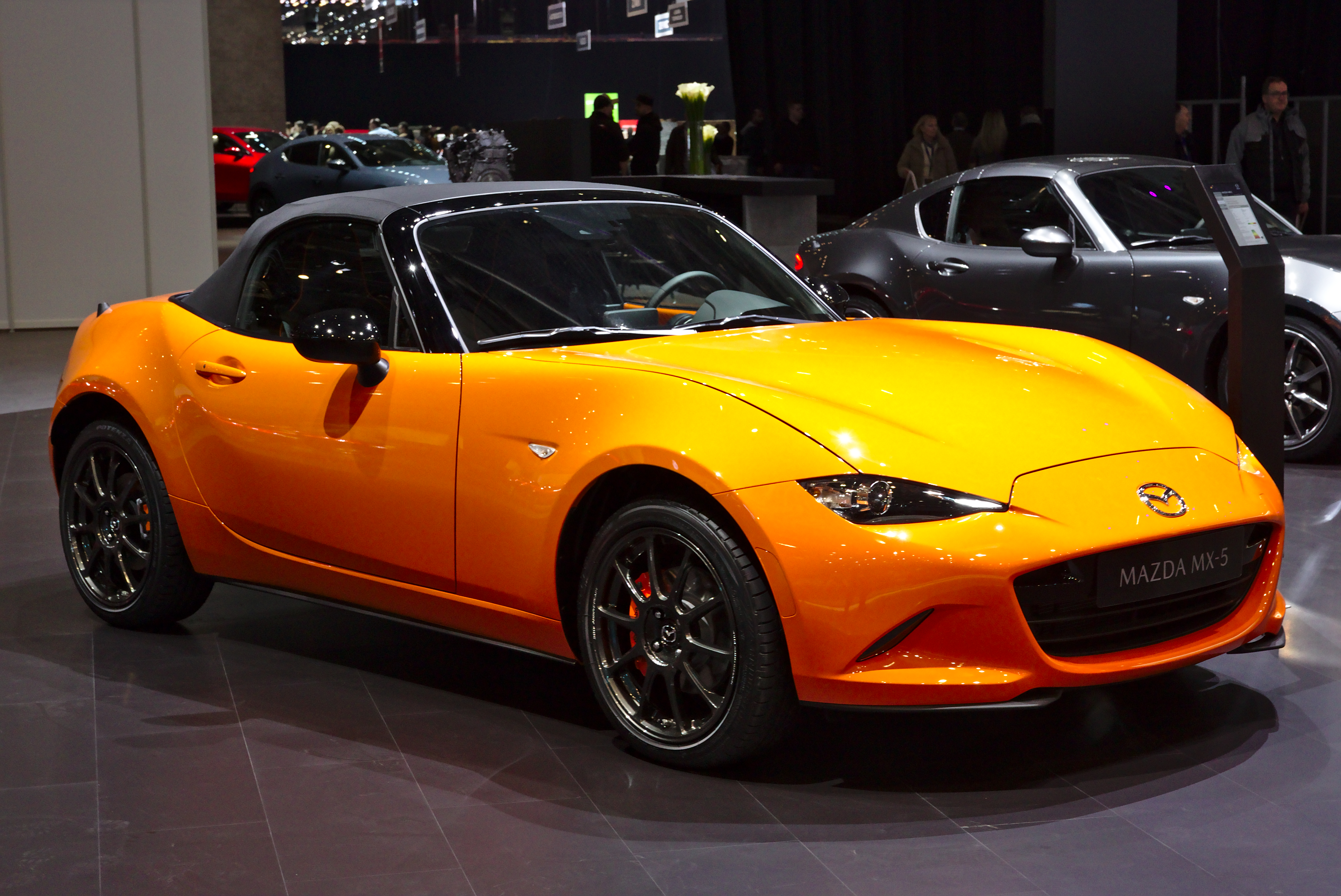
MX-5 30th Anniversary Edition

To celebrate the 30th anniversary of the MX-5, Mazda released a limited-edition variant of the ND. The MX-5 Miata 30th Anniversary Edition debuted at the 2019 Chicago Auto Show on 7 February. The car comes in a Racing Orange colour with a special numbering badge, as well as engraved Rays forged aluminium wheels and updated orange Brembo front and orange Nissin rear brake calipers along with Recaro seats with orange piping. Each U.S. market owner was able to configure their 30th Anniversary Edition MX-5 before placing a $500 deposit. Of the 3,000 worldwide units, only 500 examples were allocated to the U.S., but after feedback from buyers, Mazda announced that an additional 143 units would be allocated for the U.S. market. 165 examples were exported to Canada, 30 went to Australia, and 30 were sold in the Philippines, including the 3,000th unit.

=== Mazda MX-5 Eunos Edition (2020) ===
Available only in France with a limited run of 110 units, the MX-5 Eunos Edition features a Jet Black Mica exterior, burgundy Napa leather interior, and black Rays wheels as an homage to the Eunos brand and the 1992 S-Limited Roadster.

=== Mazda MX-5 100th Anniversary (2020) ===
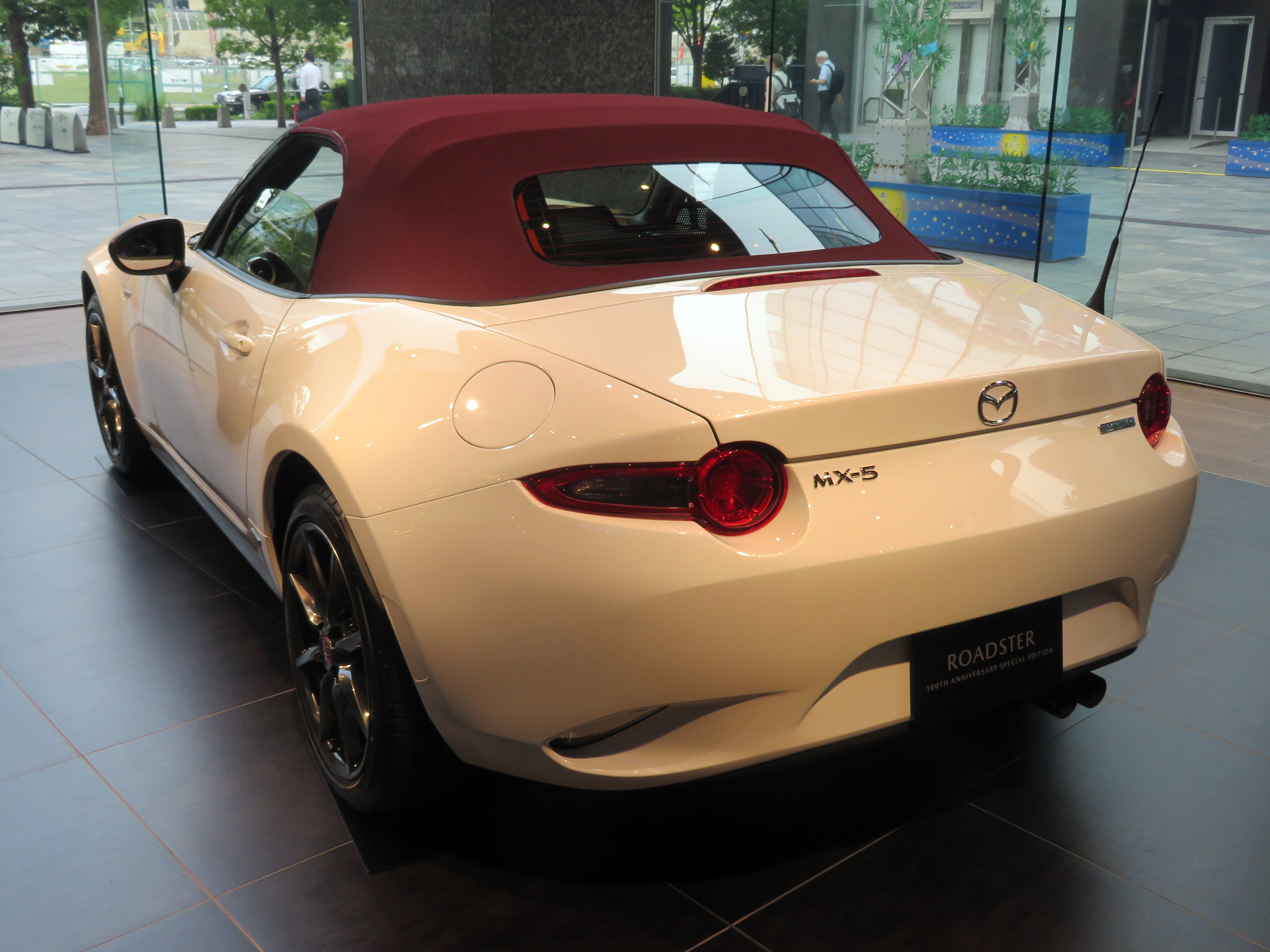
MX-5 100th Anniversary (Japan, rear view)

Commemorating Mazda's 100-year anniversary and paying homage to their R360 coupe, Mazda released the 100th Anniversary Mazda MX-5 Miata and MX-5 Miata RF in 2020. Based on their 2020 Grand Touring models, this edition is only offered in their Snowflake White Pearl Mica colour and paired with their Garnet Red Napa leather seats, a colour combination inspired by the R360. There are several interior accents, with special 100th Anniversary badges and logos throughout. The "100 YEARS 1920–2020" anniversary logo is imprinted on the seat headrests, the key fob, and central wheel caps. "1920–2020" badges appear on the red accent rugs and front wings of the car. The convertible version of this edition has an exclusive burgundy top, while the retractable fastback (RF) version has a piano black top. Less than 700 of these editions across the Mazda lineup (comprising the MX-30, 2, 3, 6, CX-3, CX-30, CX-5, CX-9, and MX-5) have been built and distributed worldwide.

=== Mazda MX-5 MCP 25th Anniversary Edition (2022) ===
Available exclusively in the Philippines to commemorate the 25th anniversary of Miata Club Philippines, the MX-5 MCP 25th Anniversary Edition features a Platinum Quartz Metallic exterior with a navy blue soft top and a red stripe. Each unit came with a commemorative book highlighting the history of the car club.

=== Mazda MX-5 Flat Out Edition (2024) ===
Available exclusively in Polish dealerships, the Mazda MX-5 ND Flat Out edition is a limited edition developed in collaboration with motorsport YouTuber Marcin "Radzio" Radecki. The special edition Mazda MX-5 features a range of technical and mechanical enhancements designed for optimal track performance. These include an improved suspension setup for track use, additional chassis bracing, more aggressive geometry settings, and a Bastuck exhaust system. The vehicle is equipped with EBC Yellowstuff brake pads for both front and rear, red-coloured rear brake calipers, and wider 17x8 Konig Hypergram Bronze HG87100458 wheels fitted with Bridgestone Potenza Sport 215/40/17 tyres. Additionally, the car includes non-standard wheel bolts and valve caps.

Stylistically, this edition stands out with a full-body wrap according to the presented design, a Mazda front splitter, side skirts, and both a rear spoiler on the boot lid and a rear spoiler on the bumper. The interior features a custom-designed shift knob by N-Engineering, an extra-padded gearbox tunnel, and Alcantara trimming on the door panels, shift knob and handbrake boots, and dashboard elements. The dashboard and door panels are also adorned with Alcantara. Other unique touches include a painted key fob cover and engraved "FLAT OUT" emblems on the boot lid. Recaro seats and a special "FLAT OUT" livery complete the distinctive look. This version is only available with 2 litre motor.

=== Mazda Spirit Racing Roadster 12R ===
Mazda MX-5 12R
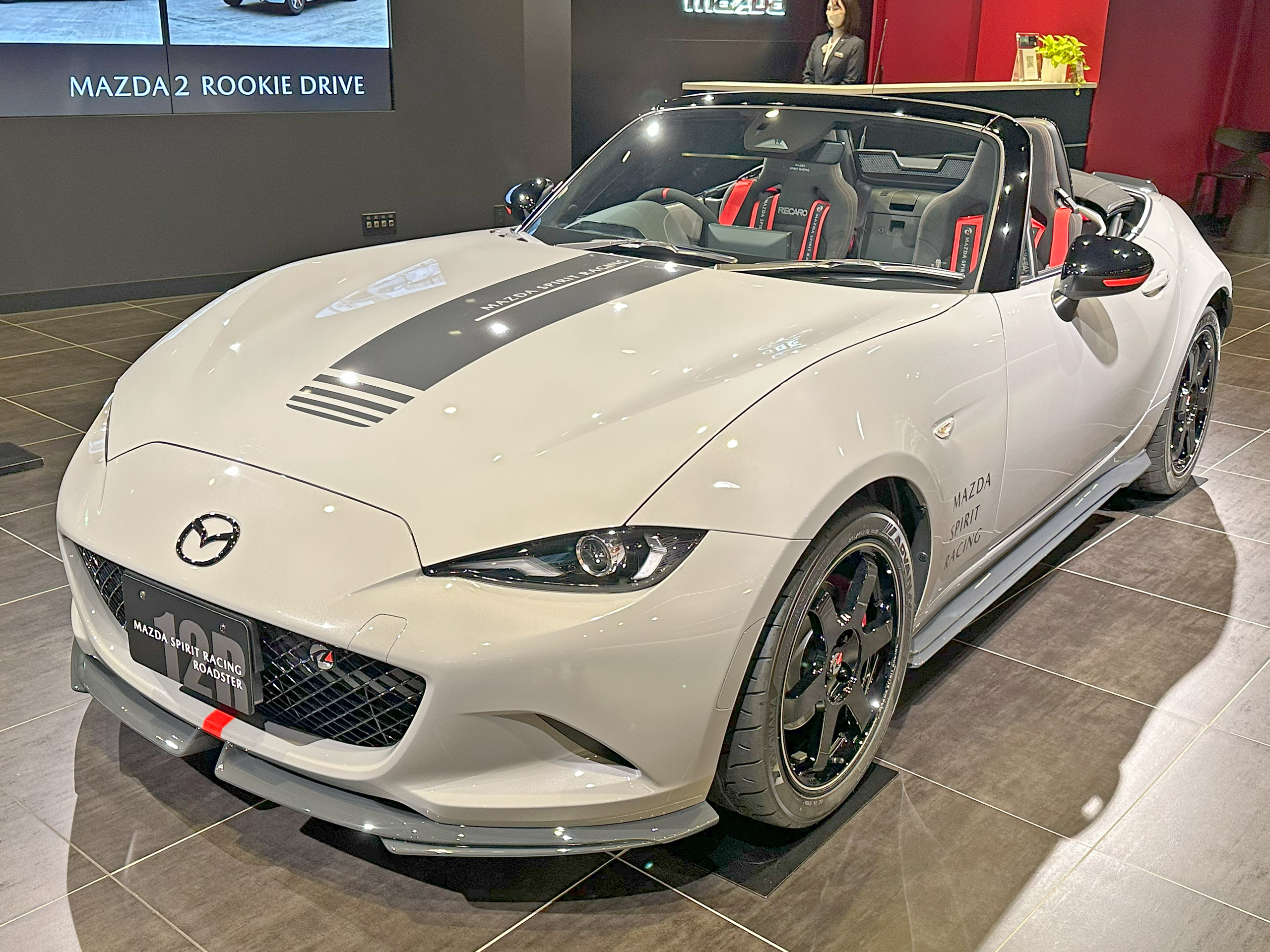

Overview
- Manufacturer: Mazda
- Assembly: Hiroshima, Japan
- Designer: Mazda Design Team

Body and chassis
- Class: Sports car
- Body style: 2-door roadster

Powertrain
- Engine: 2.0 L Skyactiv-G inline-4
- Power output: 200 PS (147 kW; 197 hp)
- Transmission: 6-speed manual
- Hybrid drivetrain: RWD

Dimensions
- Wheelbase: 2,265 mm (89.2 in)
- Length: 3,945 mm (155.3 in)
- Width: 1,680 mm (66.1 in)
- Height: 1,235 mm (48.6 in)
- Curb weight: ~1,050 kg (2,315 lb)

The Spirit Racing Roadster 12R is a road-registerable but track-ready variant of the MX-5 released in Japan. Only 200 will be made.

The 12R is equipped with a naturally aspirated 2.0-litre inline-4 Skyactiv-G engine, delivering 197 hp (147 kW; 200 PS) at 7,000 rpm and 159 lb⋅ft (216 N⋅m) at 4,000 rpm. This engine features a revised intake system, lightweight pistons, and an optimized exhaust manifold. The engine is paired with a six-speed manual transmission

The 12R employs a limited-slip differential for improved traction and stability during cornering. The braking system features Brembo brakes for providing stopping power.

Mazda claims that the 12R can accelerate from 0–100 km/h (62 mph) in 5.4 seconds, with a top speed of 225 km/h (140 mph).

The chassis is reinforced yet lightweight, made from a combination of aluminium and high-strength steel.

The 12R follows Mazda's Kodo design philosophy, emphasizing sleek lines and an athletic stance. The aggressive front fascia features LED headlights with signature daytime running lights. The sculpted side profile highlights aerodynamic efficiency. The 12R variant introduces exclusive paint finishes such as Soul Red Crystal and Polymetal Gray, along with bespoke badging. At the rear, the car maintains the MX-5's signature taillight design while incorporating a redesigned bumper and dual exhaust outlets.

Mazda also released a lesser version for international markets called the Spirit Racing Roadster (without "12R") that has most of the same upgrades but using the standard 181 hp (135 kW; 184 PS) engine. The Roadster RF is similar to the Spirit Racing Roadster but with a hardtop.

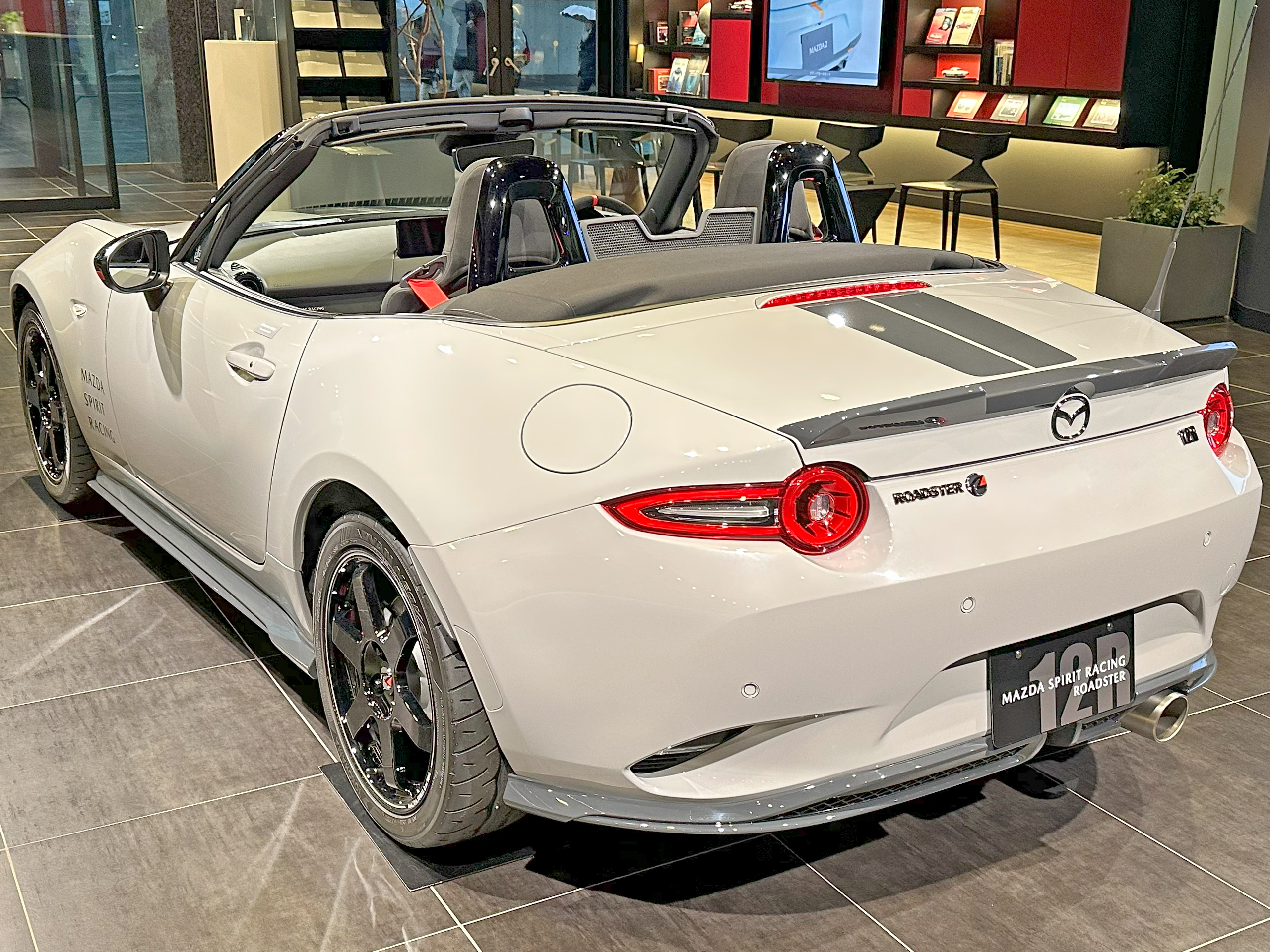
Rear view

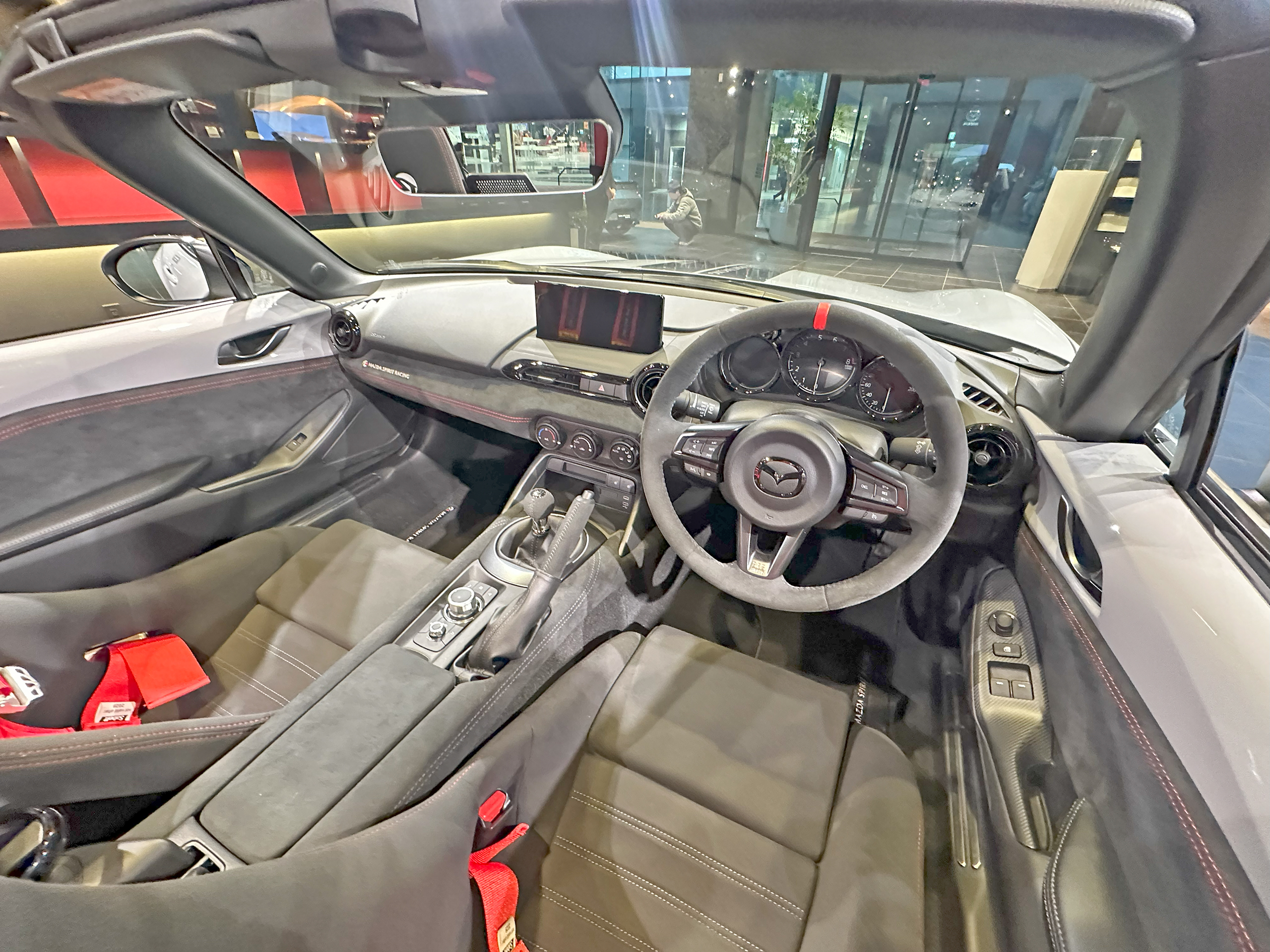
Interior

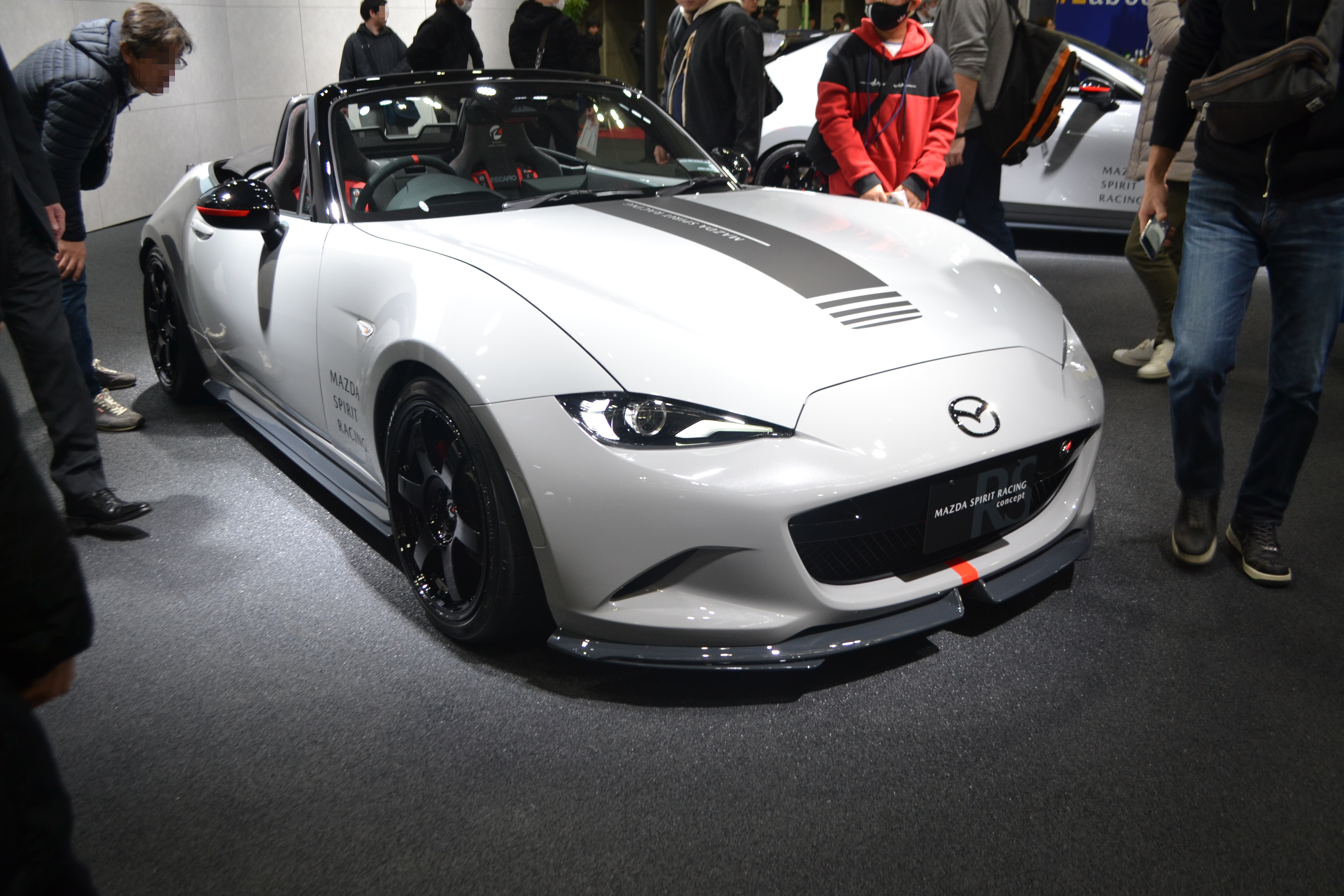
Mazda Spirit Racing RS Concept

== Gallery ==
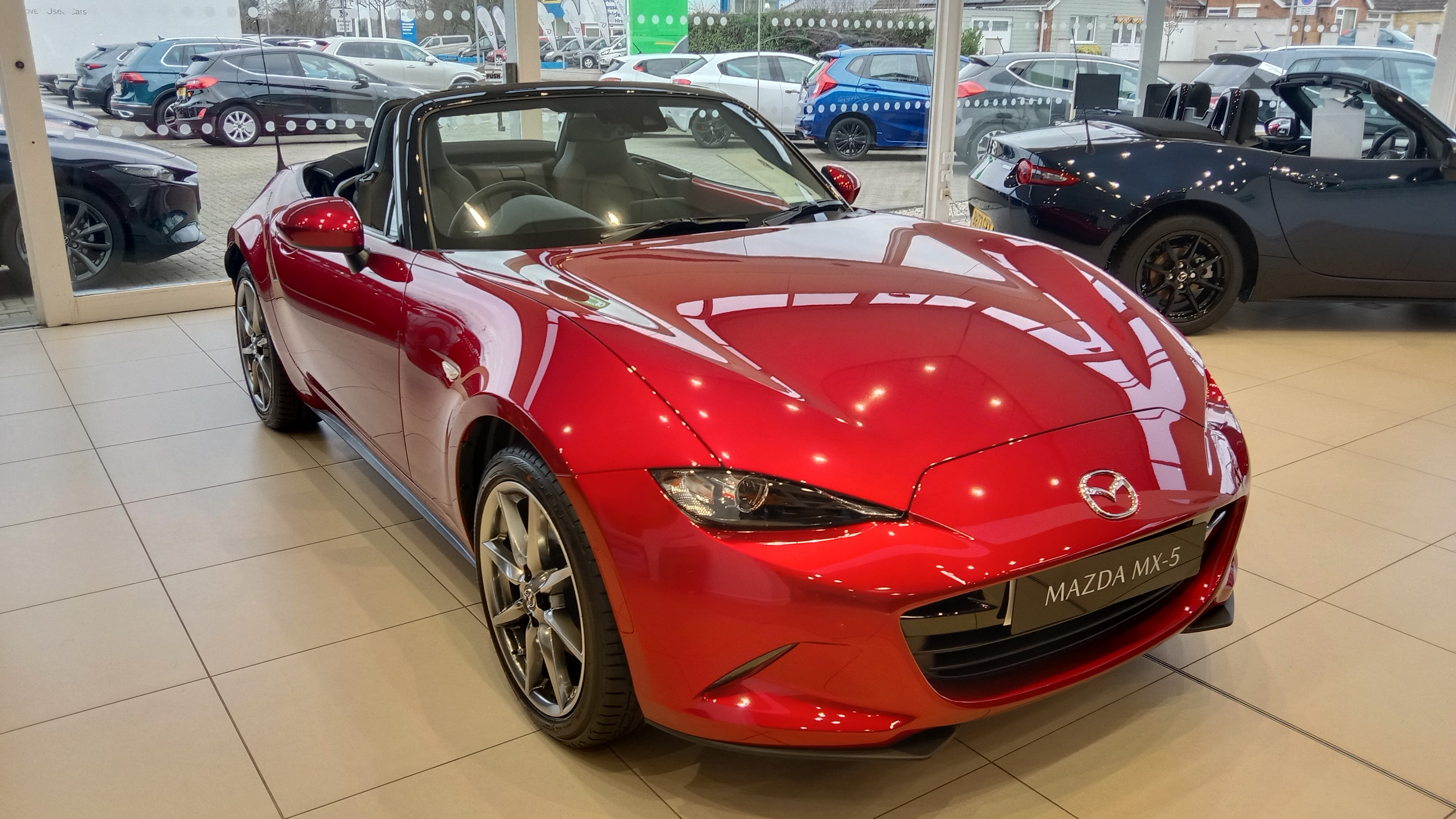
Convertible front view

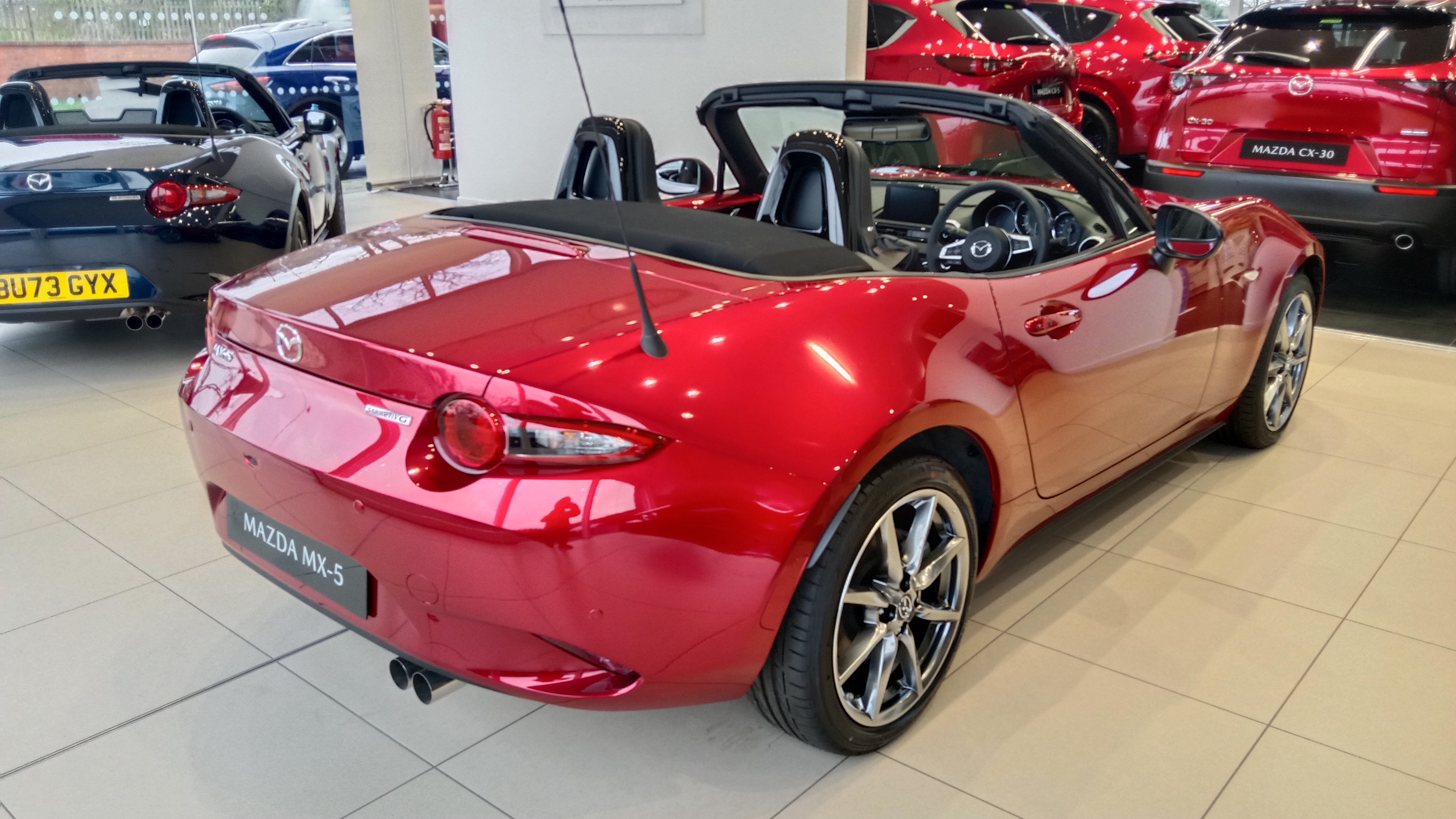
Convertible rear view

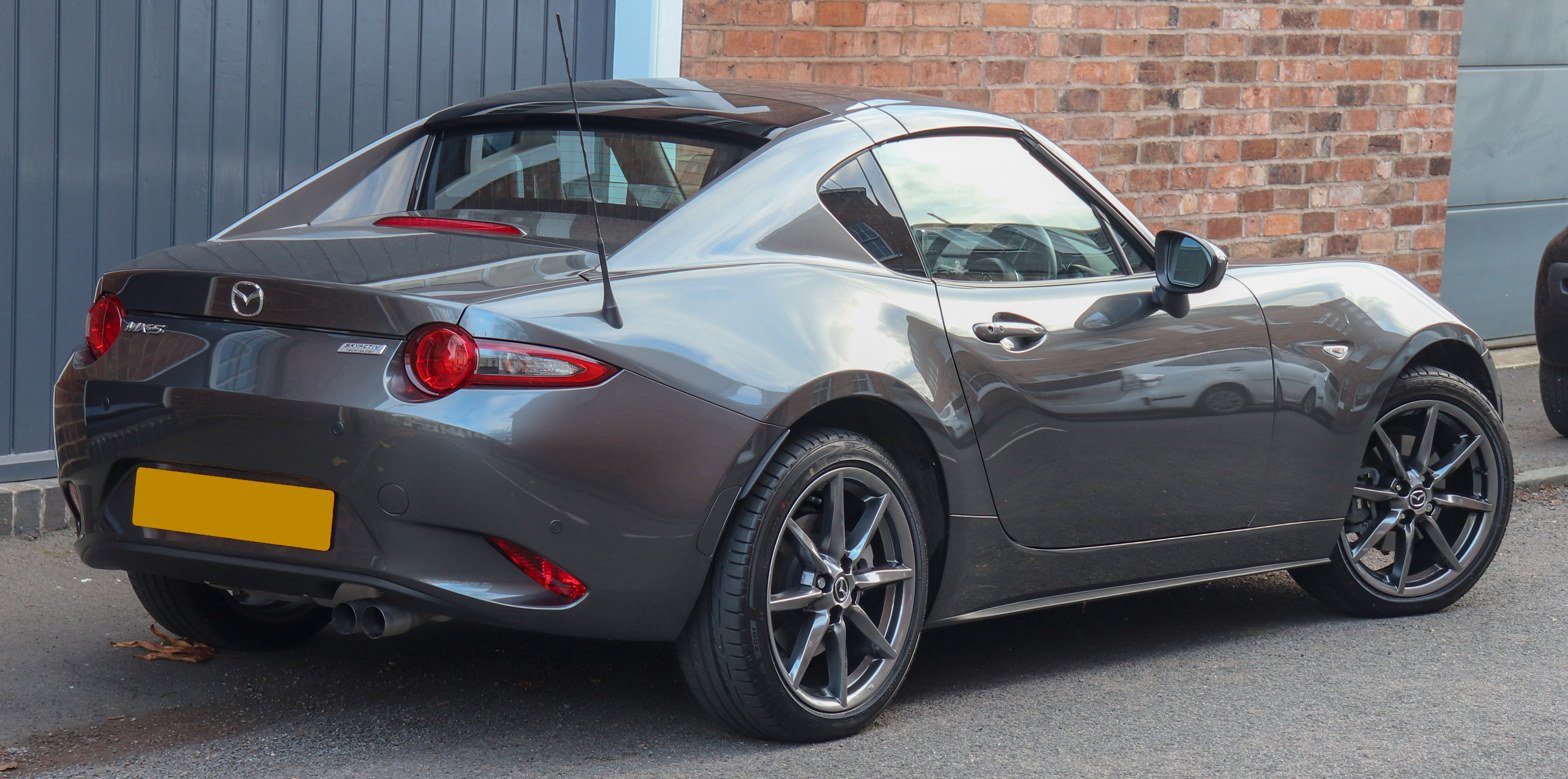
RF hardtop

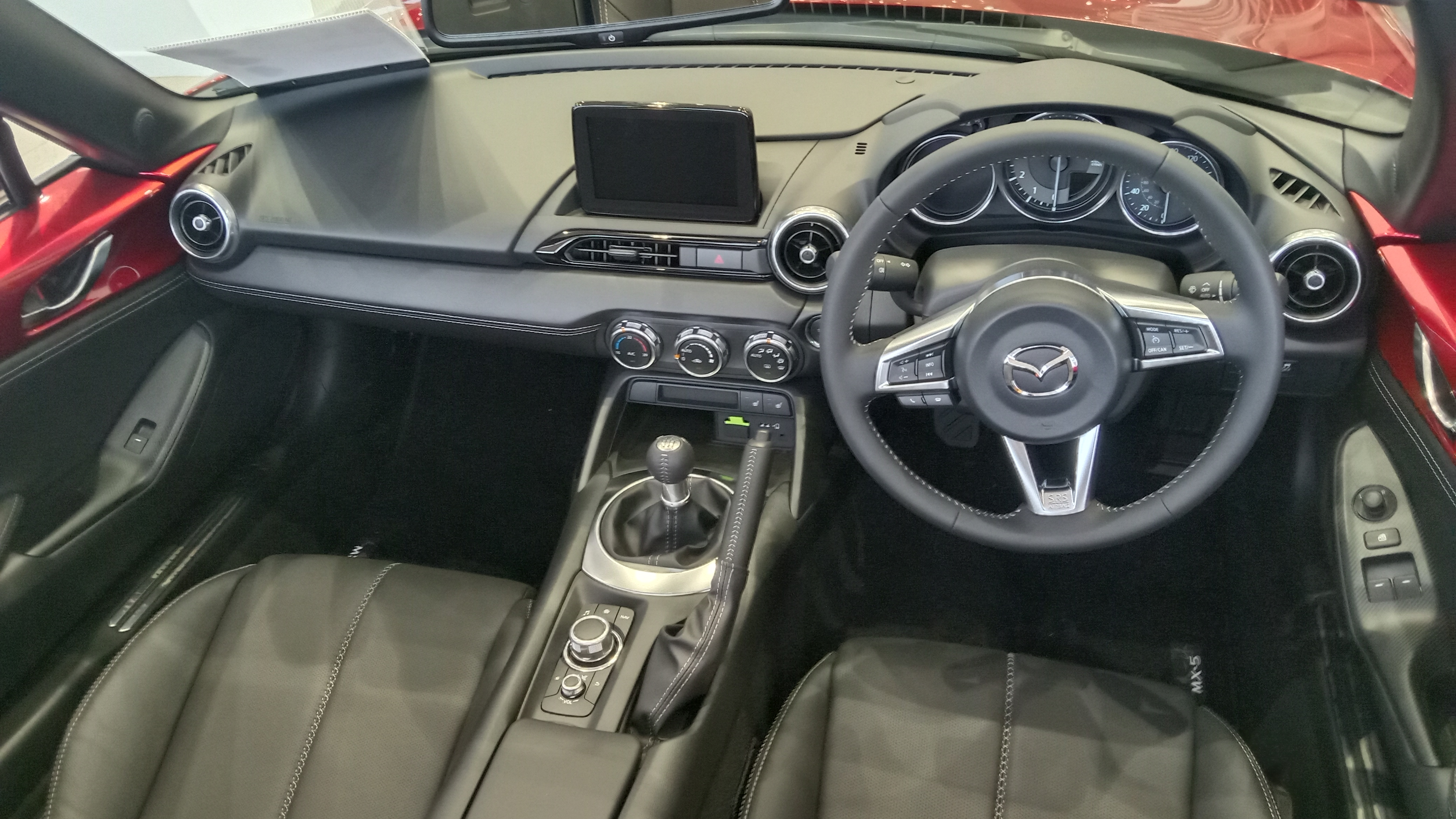
Interior

== Specifications ==
Petrol engines
Model	Calendar years	Model	Transmission	Displacement	Power	Torque	0–100 km/h (62 mph)	CO_{2} Emissions
1.5 L	2015–	Convertible	Manual	1,496 cc (91 cu in)	96 kW (129 hp; 131 PS)	150 N⋅m (111 lbf⋅ft)	8.3 s	139 g/km
1.5 L	2017–	RF	Manual	1,496 cc (91 cu in)	96 kW (129 hp; 131 PS)	150 N⋅m (111 lbf⋅ft)	8.6 s	142 g/km
2.0 L	2015–2018	Convertible	Manual	1,998 cc (122 cu in)	118 kW (158 hp; 160 PS)	200 N⋅m (148 lbf⋅ft)	7.3 s	154 g/km
2.0 L	2016–2018	RF	Manual	1,998 cc (122 cu in)	118 kW (158 hp; 160 PS)	200 N⋅m (148 lbf⋅ft)	7.5 s	154 g/km
2.0 L	2016–2018	RF/Convertible	Automatic	1,998 cc (122 cu in)	118 kW (158 hp; 160 PS)	200 N⋅m (148 lbf⋅ft)	8.5 s	149 g/km
2.0 L	2019–	RF/Convertible	Automatic/Manual	1,998 cc (122 cu in)	135 kW (181 hp; 184 PS)	205 N⋅m (151 lbf⋅ft)	6.5–7.9 s	156 g/km

== Safety ==
Euro NCAP test results* Mazda MX-5 (2015)
Test	Points	%
Overall:	4 /5 stars	
Adult occupant:	31.9	84%
Child occupant:	17	80%
Pedestrian:	33.7	93%
Safety assist:	8.3	64%

Four airbags are fitted as standard, including torso airbags, pelvis airbags, and head airbags for the driver and passenger. Headrests provide protection from whiplash. A Vehicle Stability Control+ (VSC+) system, an 'active' bonnet for pedestrian protection, and a Lane Departure Warning System (LDWS) are available. Since the MX-5 is a two-seater, the front passenger airbag can be disabled for a child passenger and a suitable rear-facing child seat restraint can be installed. In the Euro NCAP safety test, the MX-5 suffered from a malfunctioning driver's airbag, which was unable to prevent the dummy from hitting the steering wheel. Its rating was 4 out of 5 stars.

ANCAP test results* Mazda MX-5 (2016)
Test	Score
Overall	5 /5 stars
Frontal offset	14.20/16
Side impact	16/16
Pole	2/2
Seat belt reminders	3/3
Whiplash protection	Good
Pedestrian protection	Good
Electronic stability control	Standard

== Reception ==
The fourth-generation MX-5 received praise from automotive journalists. Jeremy Clarkson, in his "Driving" column of The Sunday Times, gave the car five out of five stars, calling it an "engineering gem." He also commented that "It’s a cure for depression, this car, it really is. You just can’t be in a bad mood when you’re driving it."

Top Gear magazine gave the 2017 model a score of nine out of 10, calling it "A complete sweetie of a roadster, this is the best the MX-5 has been perhaps ever."; in April 2024, the magazine rated the car eight out of 10. The car also received perfect five star review ratings from Car and Driver and What Car? magazines.

== Accolades ==
- Car of the Year Japan Award 2015–2016.
- Automobile magazine's "All-Stars" list in 2016.
- Car and Driver's 10Best list from 2016 to 2019.
- Yahoo! Autos 2016 Fresh Ride of the Year.
- Roadshow by CNET Editors Choice Best Convertibles 2016.
- World Car of the Year at the 2016 World Car Awards (UK).
- 2016 World Car of the Year Awards: "World Car of the Year" and "World Car Design of the Year".
- 2016 UK Car of the Year.
- The Daily Telegraph 2016 Car of the Year.
- Wheels 2016 Car of the Year
- Auto Express 2017 Roadster of the Year.
- Red Dot Best of the Best Award: Product Design 2017.
- New York Daily News DNA Award 2018.
- What Car? Magazine 2018 Best Convertible Less Than £25,000.
- MotorWeek Drivers' Choice Awards Best Convertible 2018.
- Edmunds.com 2019 Editor's Choice Awards: Best Sports Car.
- Car and Driver 2024 Editor's Choice: Affordable Sports Car.
