= Ford Ranger (T6) =

Mid-size pickup truck manufactured by Ford Motor Company

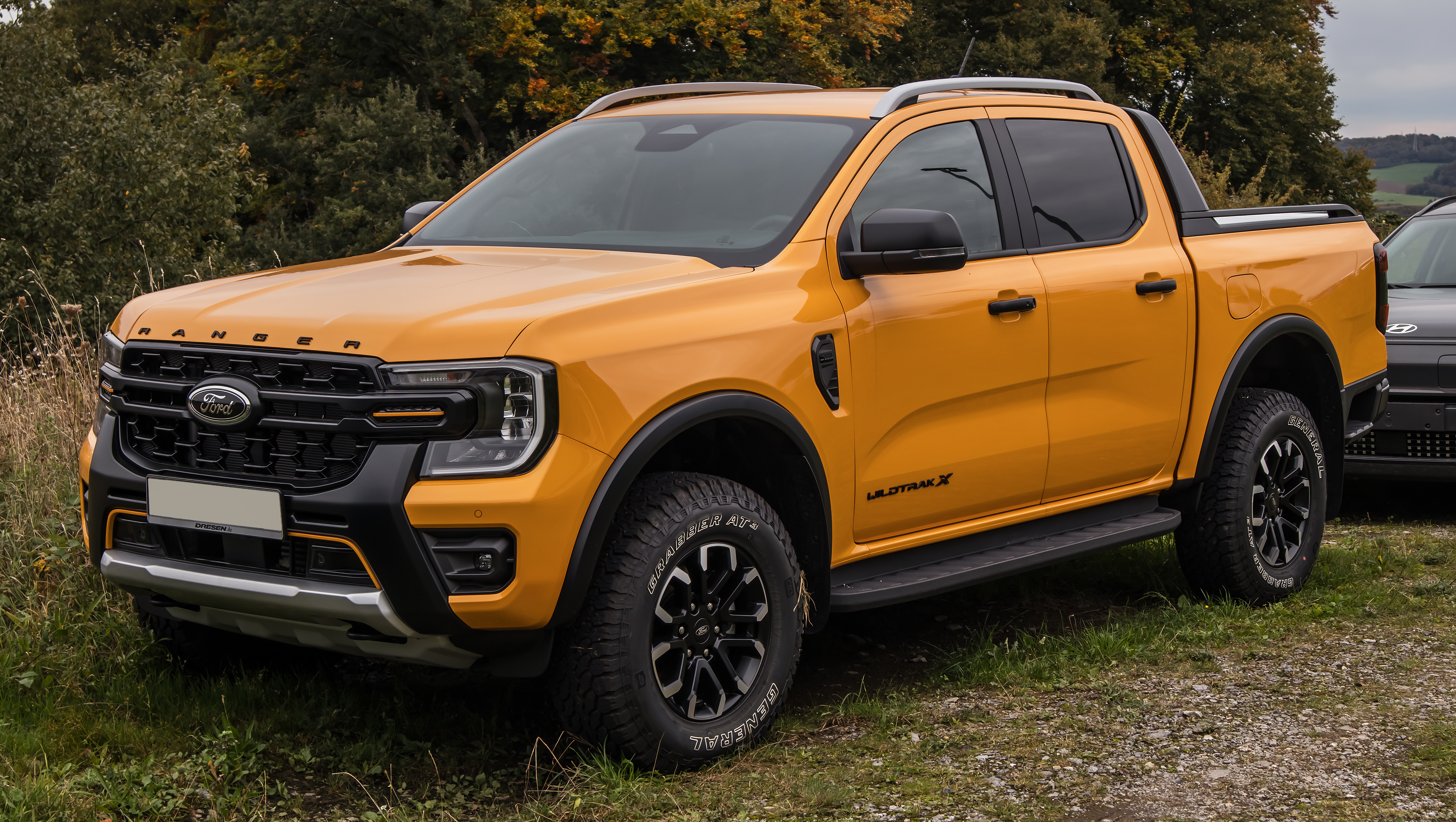
- Ford Ranger Wildtrak X

Overview
- Manufacturer: Ford Motor Company
- Production: 2011–present
- Model years: 2019–present (North America)

Body and chassis
- Class: Mid-size pickup truck
- Body style: 2-door single cab 4-door extended cab 4-door double cab
- Layout: Front-engine, rear-wheel-drive or four-wheel-drive
- Platform: Ford T6
- Chassis: Body-on-frame

Chronology
- Predecessor: Ford Ranger (PJ/PK); Ford Ranger (Americas) (North America and Argentina); Ford Falcon Ute (Australia); Ford Explorer Sport Trac (North America)

The Ford Ranger (T6) is a range of mid-size pickup trucks manufactured and sold by Ford Motor Company since 2011. Designed and engineered by Ford Australia, the design consolidated worldwide production of the Ranger into a single model range, replacing the 1998–2012 Ranger marketed in North America and South America and the Mazda-derived Ranger sold in Asia-Pacific, Europe, and several Latin American markets. Sold worldwide, the Ranger is either the largest pickup truck line sold by Ford (in countries where Ford does not officially market the F-Series), or it is slotted in size between the compact Ford Maverick and the full-size Ford F-150.

Growing in size to become a midsize pickup truck, the Ford Ranger utilizes the body-on-frame Ford T6 platform; the chassis architecture also forms the basis for the Ford Bronco and Ford Everest mid-size SUVs. For 2022 production, the T6 Ranger underwent a significant body and chassis update. Ford has also produced versions of the T6 Ranger rebranded for other manufacturers, including the 2011–2019 Mazda BT-50 and the current-generation Volkswagen Amarok.

While developed for global sales, the T6 Ranger was not initially marketed in the United States and Canada. At the time of its 2011 release, Ford was concentrating its resources of improving the fuel efficiency of its F-Series trucks; declining sales of compact and midsize pickup trucks in the United States had led to the discontinuation of the Ranger and the Ford Explorer Sport Trac (the latter, nearly the same size as the T6 Ranger). Changes in consumer demand during the mid-2010s led Ford to introduce the T6 Ranger to North America for 2019, alongside the release of the compact Maverick for 2022. In markets where the Ranger serves as the largest Ford pickup truck line, Ford markets the off-road oriented Ranger Raptor and the high-payload Ranger Super Duty (introduced 2025).

== First generation (P375/PX; 2011) ==
First generation
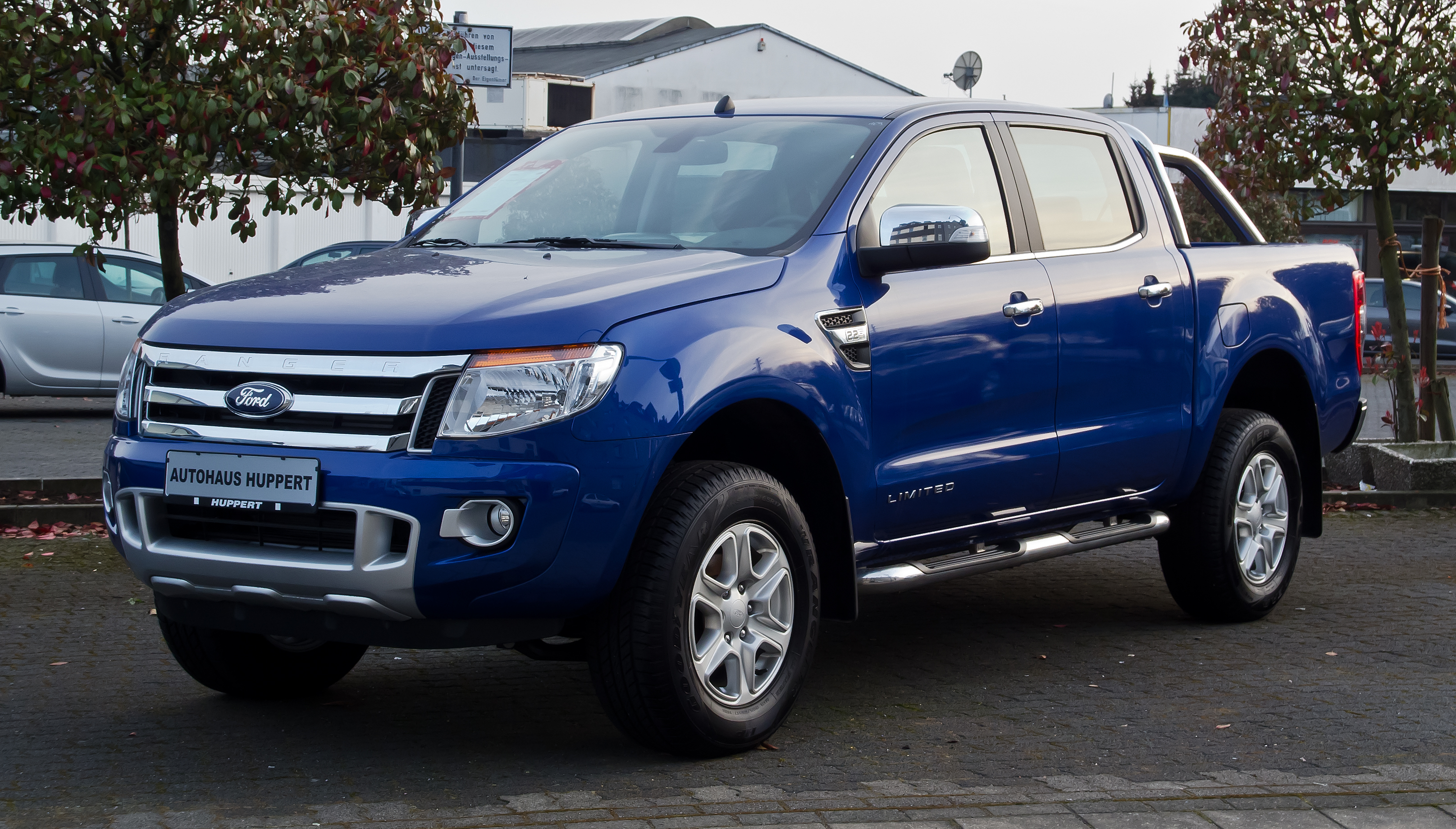
- Pre-facelift

Overview
- Model code: FG P375 MCA NA; KD P375 Thailand; KE P375 South Africa; KF P375 Argentina; PX; PX MkII (PX2); PX MkIII (PX3)
- Also called: Arquus Trigger VT4 (French military)
- Production: September 2011–2022; 2018–2023 (North America)
- Model years: 2019–2023 (North America)
- Assembly: Thailand: Rayong (AAT); Rayong (FTM); United States: Wayne, Michigan (Michigan Assembly Plant); South Africa: Silverton, Pretoria (Ford South Africa); Argentina: General Pacheco (Ford Argentina); Vietnam: Hai Duong (Ford Vietnam); Nigeria: Lagos (Coscharis Motors); Cambodia: Pursat (Ford Cambodia)
- Designer: Craig Metros (chief designer)

Body and chassis
- Related: Ford Everest (U375); Mazda BT-50 (UN); Troller T4

Powertrain
- Engine: Petrol: 2.3 L EcoBoost I4 turbo; 2.5 L Duratec 25 I4; Diesel: 2.0 L EcoBlue I4 turbo; 2.0 L EcoBlue I4 twin-turbo; 2.2 L Duratorq I4 turbo; 3.2 L Duratorq I5 turbo
- Transmission: 5/6-speed manual 6/10-speed 6R80/Ford-GM SelectShift automatic

Dimensions
- Wheelbase: 3,220–3,226 mm (126.8–127.0 in)
- Length: 5,110–5,398 mm (201.2–212.5 in)
- Width: 1,849–2,028 mm (72.8–79.8 in)
- Height: 1,703–1,873 mm (67.0–73.7 in)
- Kerb weight: 1,866–2,014 kg (4,114–4,440 lb)

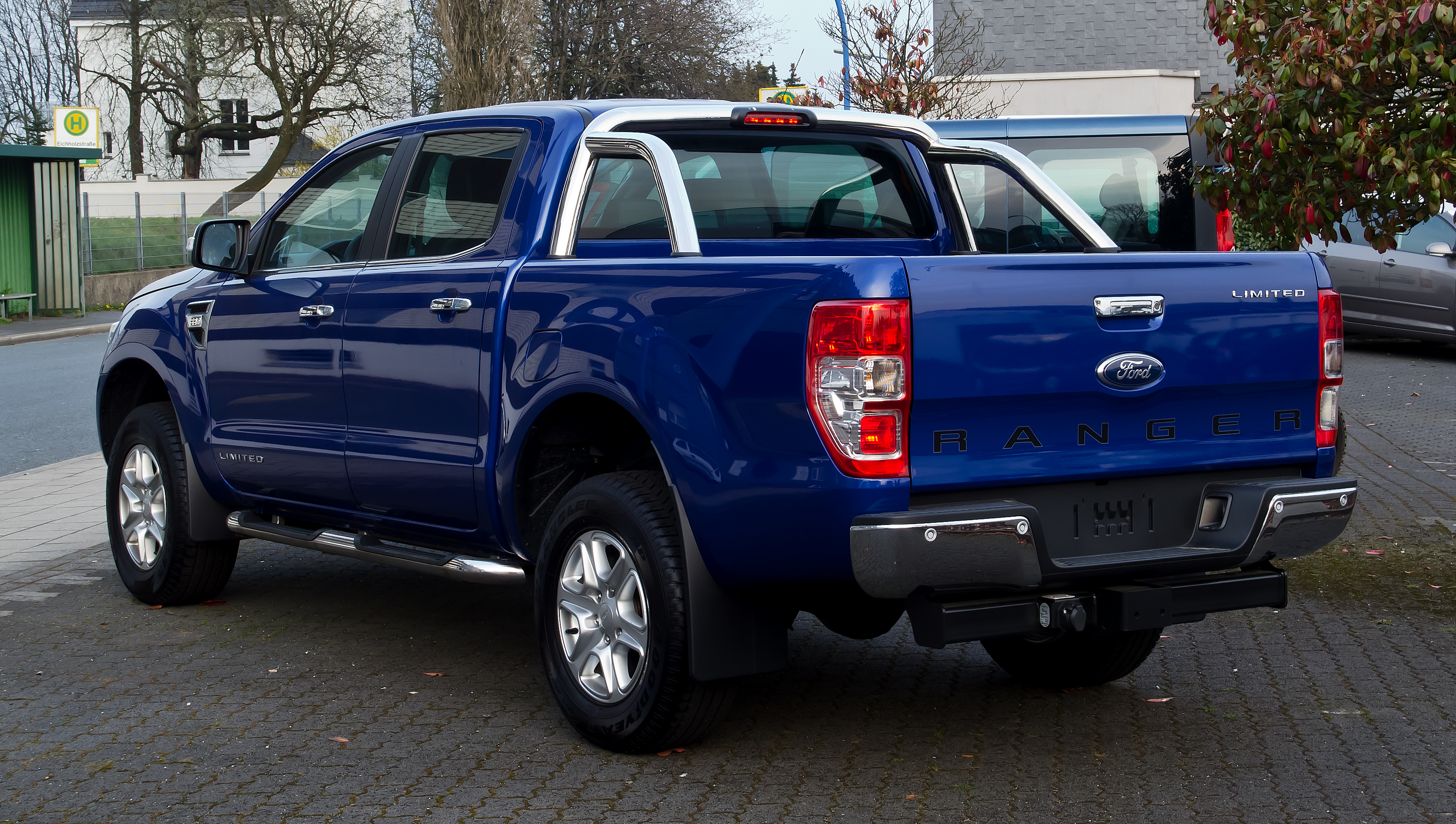
Rear (pre-facelift)

First unveiled at the Australian International Motor Show in Sydney in October 2010, production of the first-generation T6-based Ranger commenced in mid-2011. During development, the first-generation T6-based Ranger was codenamed P375, and also known by the PX model code in Australia. It is considered the third-generation Ranger in most international markets, and the fourth-generation Ranger in North America.

Similar to its 2006–2011 predecessor, the P375 Ranger is produced in three body styles worldwide. A two-door (single-cab) is standard, with a cargo capacity of 43 cubic feet (1.21 m^{3}). A cargo capacity of 64 cubic feet (1.82 m^{3}) is offered with a four-door extended cab (SuperCab in North America), or a four-door crew cab (SuperCrew in North America). Along with the standard pickup truck, the Ranger is also offered as a chassis cab, effectively taking the place of the Ford Falcon cab-chassis in Australia.

All four-door Rangers have the same ground clearance, whether two-wheel drive or four-wheel drive; two-door versions are offered with a "Hi-Rider" option in two-wheel drive configuration, giving them the same ground clearance as 4x4 versions. Hi-Rider versions (including the Wildtrak) have water-fording clearance of 31 in (800 mm), while standard-height Rangers have clearance of 24 in (600 mm). The Ranger T6 has a rated towing capacity of 7,700 lb (3,500 kg); versions with the 2.2-litre Duratorq diesel have a payload capacity of 2,939 lb (1,333 kg).

The model is produced across several facilities worldwide. First produced by the AutoAlliance (and also later Ford Thailand Manufacturing) facilities in Rayong, Thailand, production is also conducted in Argentina and South Africa, while CKD assembly is conducted in Nigeria and Vietnam. North American production is sourced from the Michigan Assembly Plant in Wayne, Michigan.

As of 2022, the Argentine version contains 46% locally made parts. 70% of its production is exported.

The model is also used as the basis for the second-generation Mazda BT-50 and the second-generation Ford Everest. The 2014–2021 Troller T4 off-road vehicle is also derived from the T6 platform shared with the Ranger.

=== Facelift ===
In 2015, the P375 Ranger underwent a major mid-cycle redesign (codenamed PX MkII in Australia), with the front fascia adopting elements of Ford Kinetic Design. In place of the rectangular three-bar grille, the Ranger adopted a slightly oval grille with a single centre bar, allowing further differentiation between the Ranger and the mechanically similar Everest, the Interior was also completely overhauled with the rear of the vehicle remaining largely unchanged.

In 2019, the P375 Ranger underwent a second, minor redesign (codenamed PX MkIII in Australia), with its exterior appearance being largely the same as the PXII with a few minor cosmetic changes to the front of the vehicle. Some mechanical changes were made such as a new front end suspension setup and the option to spec the XLT & Wildtrak trims with the 2.0-litre engine from the Ranger Raptor. The interior remained largely unchanged with upgrades to safety features and a new infotainment system based on the Ford SYNC 3 operating system.

First and second facelift, P375 Ford Ranger

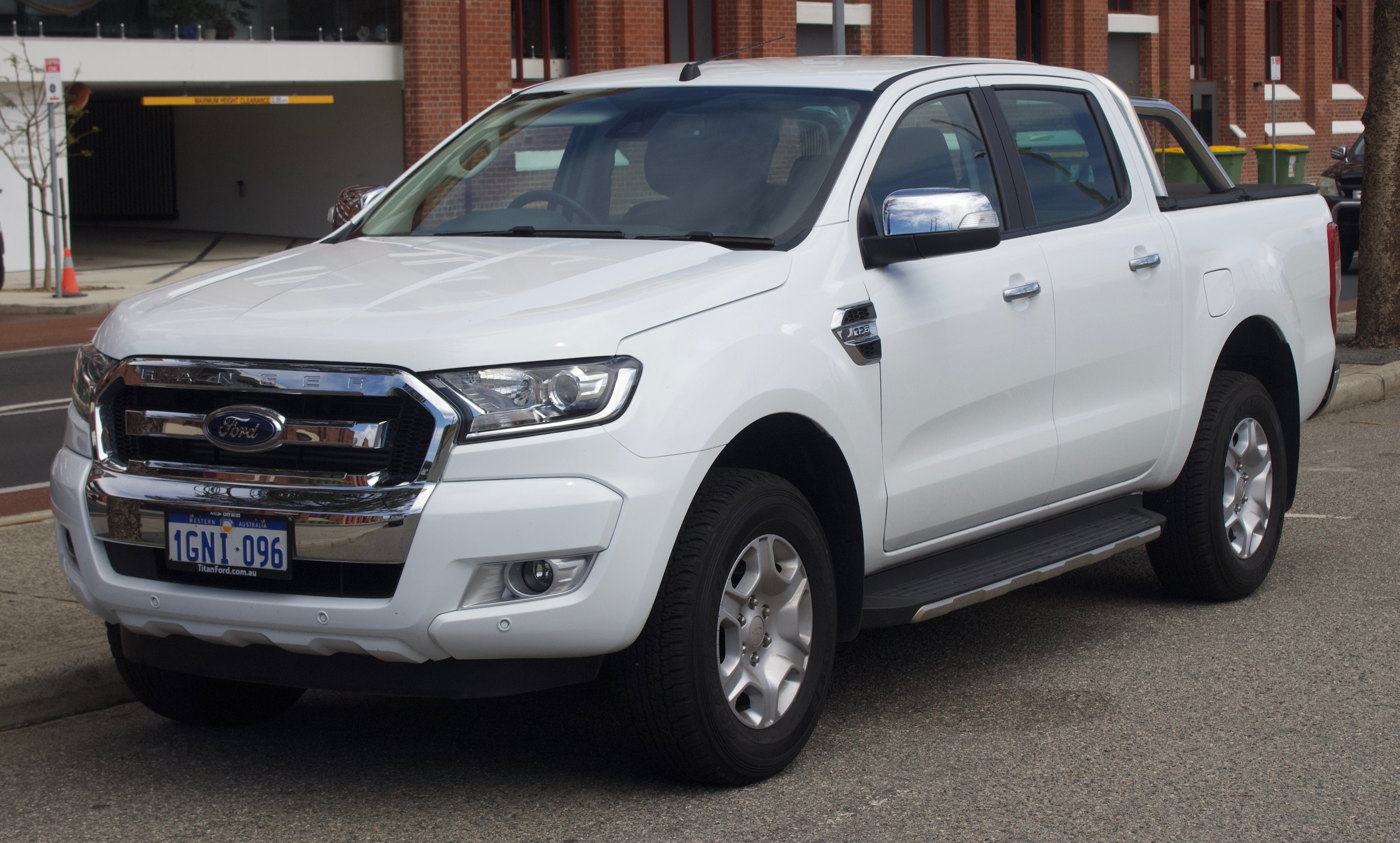
Front (facelift)

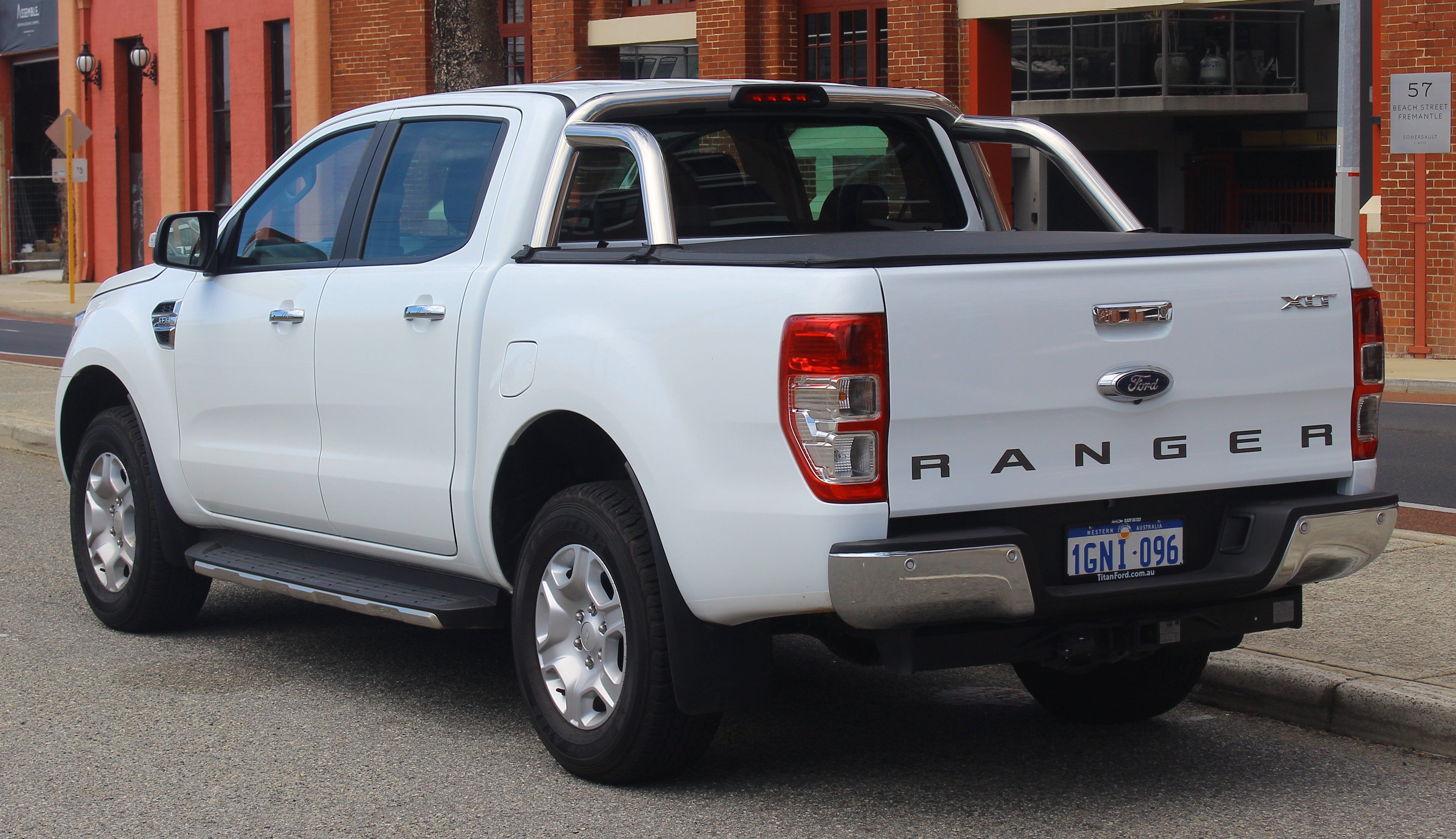
Rear (facelift)

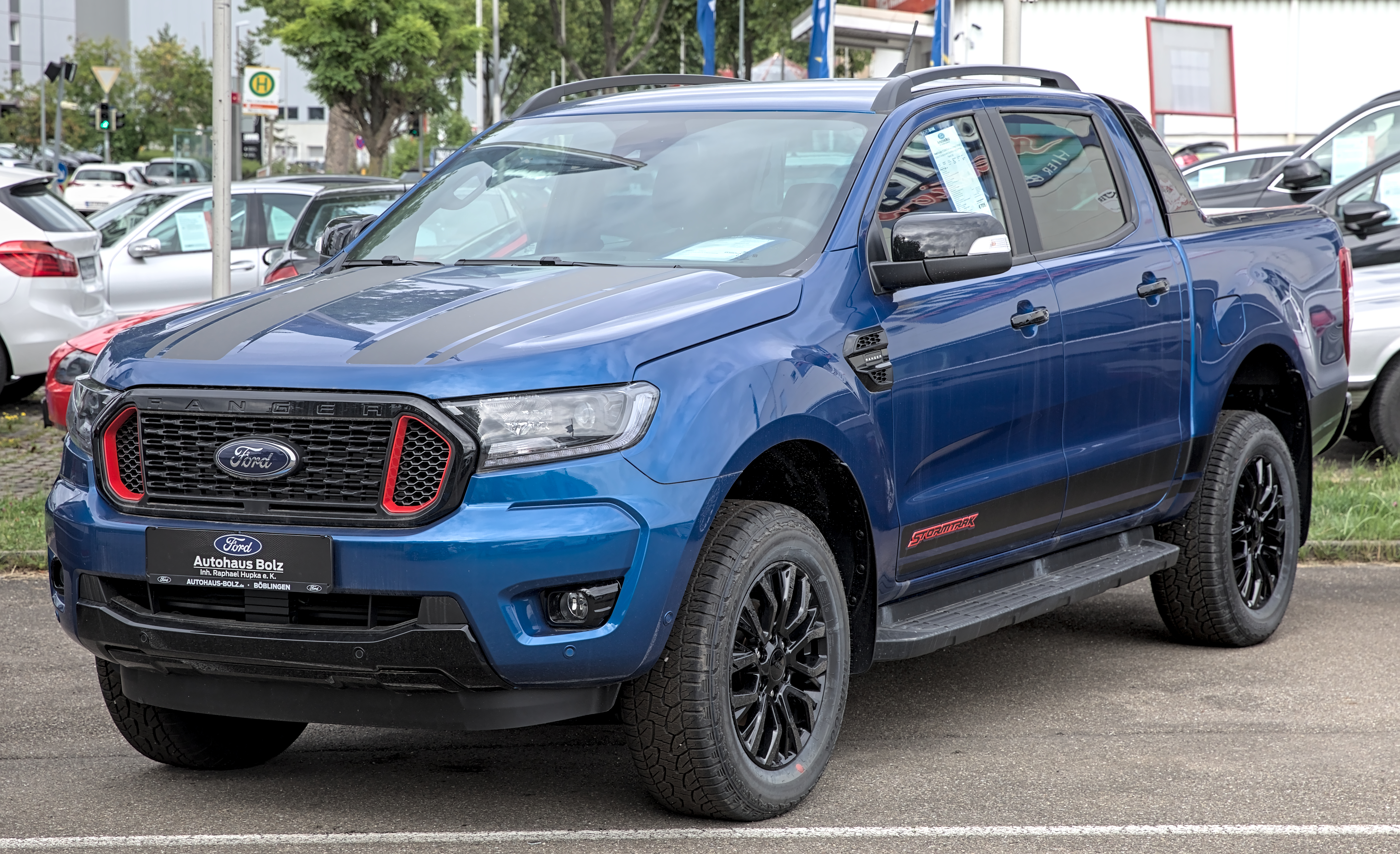
Front (second facelift)

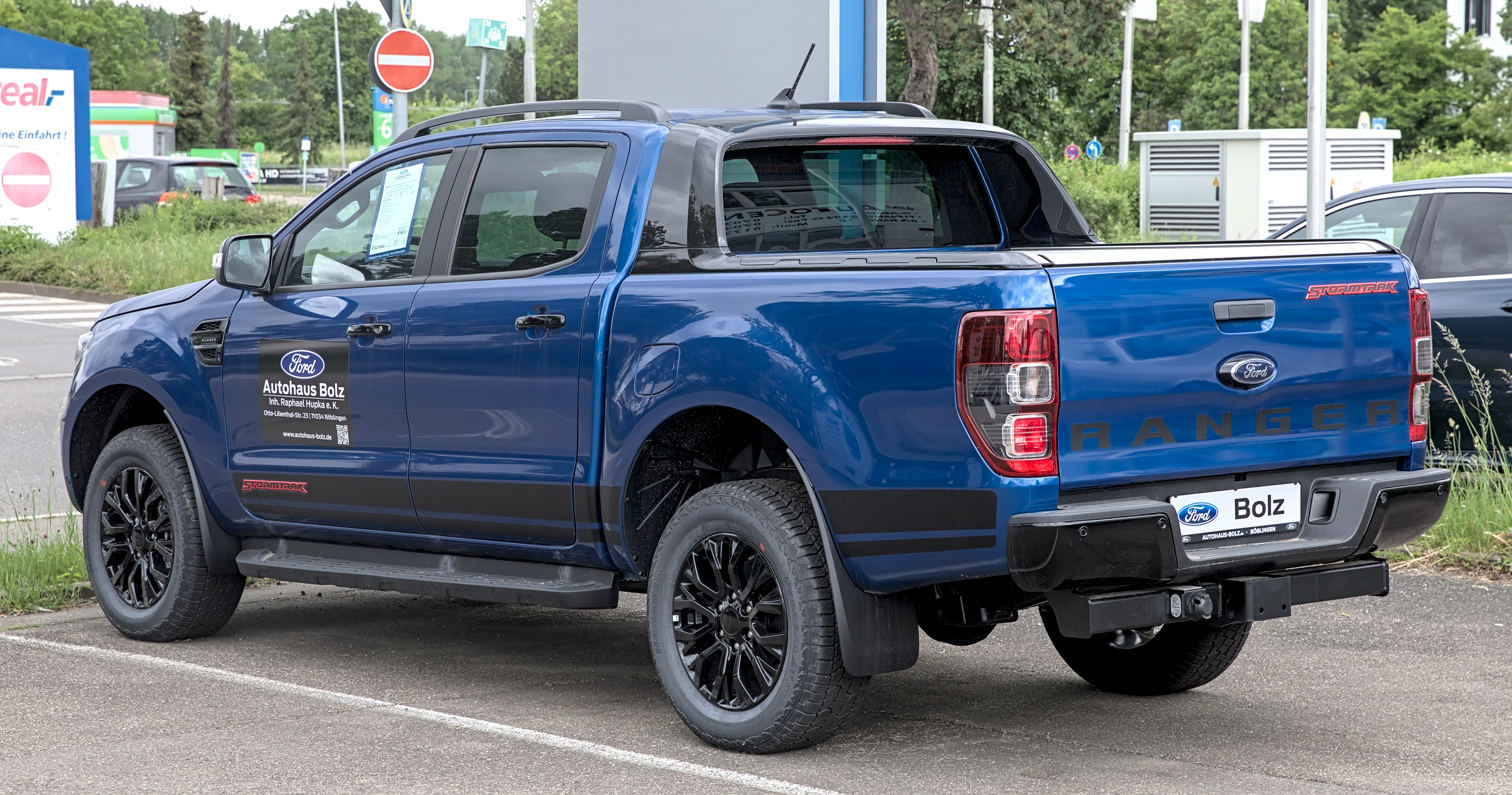
Rear (second facelift)

=== Powertrain ===
Fuel	Engine	Production	Configuration	Output	Transmission
Petrol	EcoBoost 2.3L (Mazda LF)	2019–present	2.3 L (138 cu in) DOHC 16V I4 turbo, direct injection	200 kW (270 hp) 420 N⋅m (310 lb⋅ft)	10-speed Ford-GM 10R80 automatic
Petrol	Duratec 25 (Mazda L5-VE)	2011–present	2.5 L (151.8 cu in) DOHC 16V I4	122 kW (164 hp), 226 N⋅m (167 lb⋅ft)	5-speed Ford MT75 manual
Diesel	Duratorq TDCi (ZSD-422)	2011–present	2.2 L (133.3 cu in) DOHC 16V I4 turbo, intercooled, Direct injection	88 kW (118 hp), 285 N⋅m (210 lb⋅ft); 92 kW (123 hp), 330 N⋅m (240 lb⋅ft); 110 kW (150 hp), 375 N⋅m (277 lb⋅ft); 118 kW (158 hp), 400 N⋅m (300 lb⋅ft)	6-speed Ford MT82 manual 6-speed Ford 6R80 automatic
Diesel	Duratorq TDCi (P5AT)	2011–present 2011–2019 (Thailand)	3.2 L (195.2 cu in) DOHC 20V I5; Common rail direct injection turbo, intercooled	147 kW (197 hp), 470 N⋅m (350 lb⋅ft)	6-speed Ford MT82 manual 6-speed Ford 6R80 automatic
Diesel	EcoBlue 2.0 turbo	2019–present	2.0 L (121.7 cu in) DOHC 16V I4; Common rail direct injection Intercooled turbo	125 kW (168 hp), 420 N⋅m (310 lb⋅ft)	10-speed Ford-GM 10R80 automatic or 6-speed Ford 6R80 automatic
Diesel	EcoBlue 2.0 bi-turbo	2019–present	2.0 L (121.7 cu in) DOHC 16V I4; Common rail direct injection bi-turbo Intercooled	154 kW (207 hp), 500 N⋅m (370 lb⋅ft)	10-speed Ford-GM 10R80 automatic

=== Trim levels ===
The global Ranger follows traditional Ford truck trim level nomenclature, offering XL, XLS, and XLT trim levels. Based on its four-wheel drive versions, Ford offers the Ranger Sport, Ranger FX4, Ranger Wildtrak and the Ranger Wildtrak X, with model-specific exteriors. The North American version of the Ranger shares similar nomenclature, with XL, XLT, and Lariat; the FX4 is offered as an option package for 4x4 vehicles. The Tremor trim level was introduced in North America in 2020.

==== Wildtrak ====
In certain global markets, including Australia and UK, Ford released the Ranger Wildtrak as a special edition of the Ranger. Based on the four-wheel drive crew-cab, the Wildtrak was equipped with a 3.2-litre Duratorq diesel engine with a manual or automatic transmission. To visually distinguish the model, the Wildtrak was equipped with a model-specific grille (painted dark grey), model-specific 18-inch wheels, and other exterior and interior trim. Marketed in a colour exclusive to the trim (Pride Orange), the Wildtrak was also offered in several other colours.

First-generation Ford Ranger Wildtrak

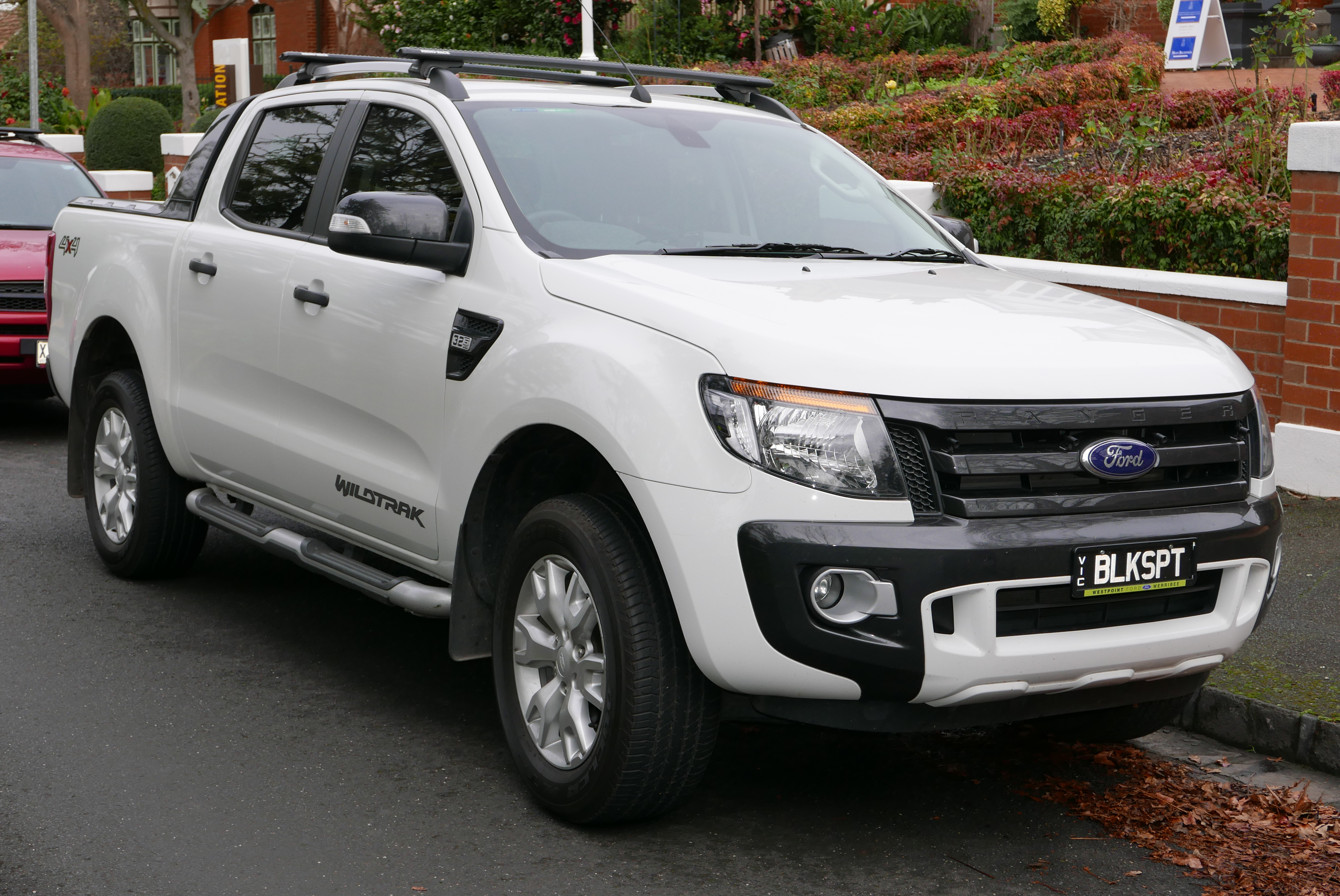
2014 Ranger Wildtrak (pre-facelift)

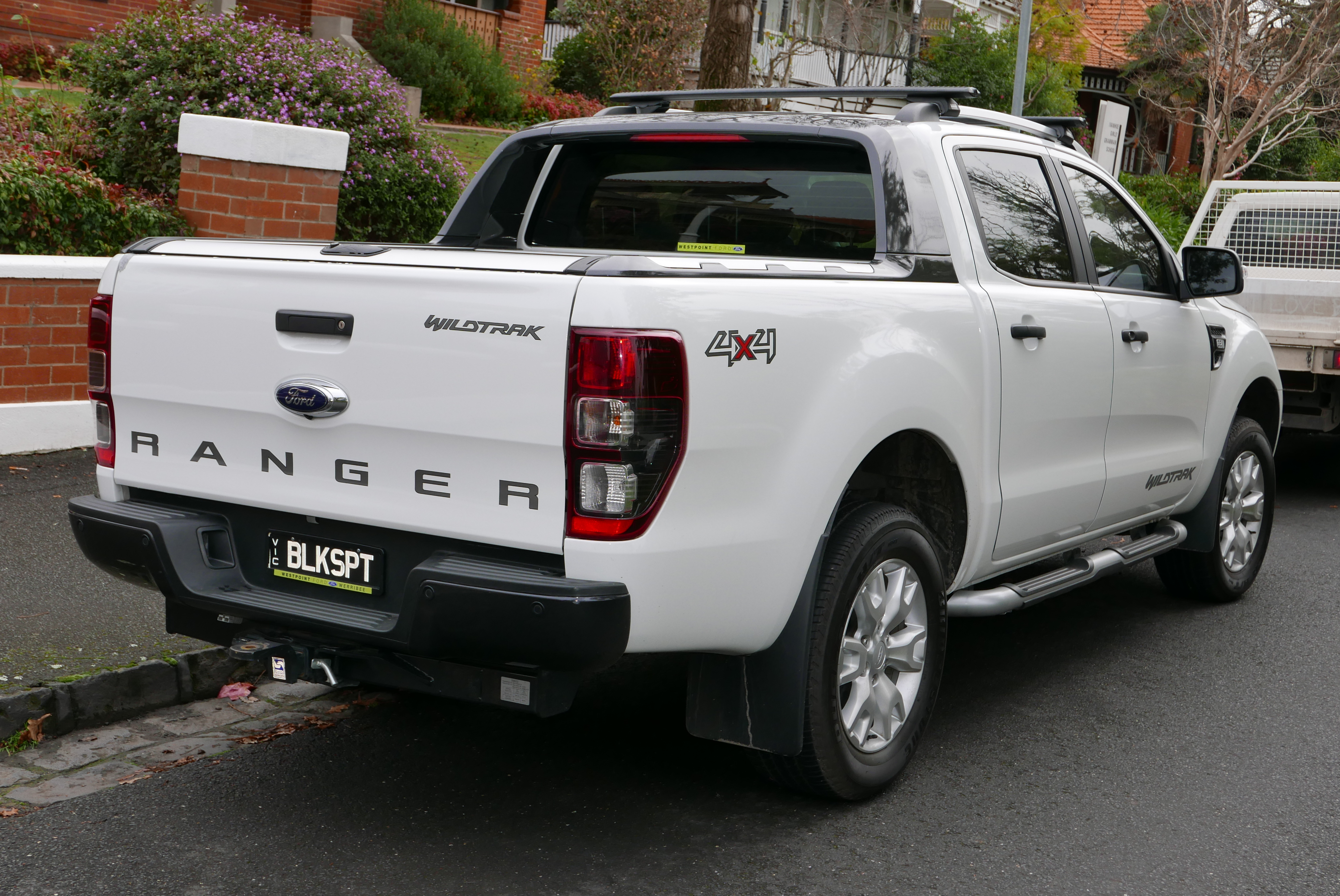
2014 Ranger Wildtrak (pre-facelift)

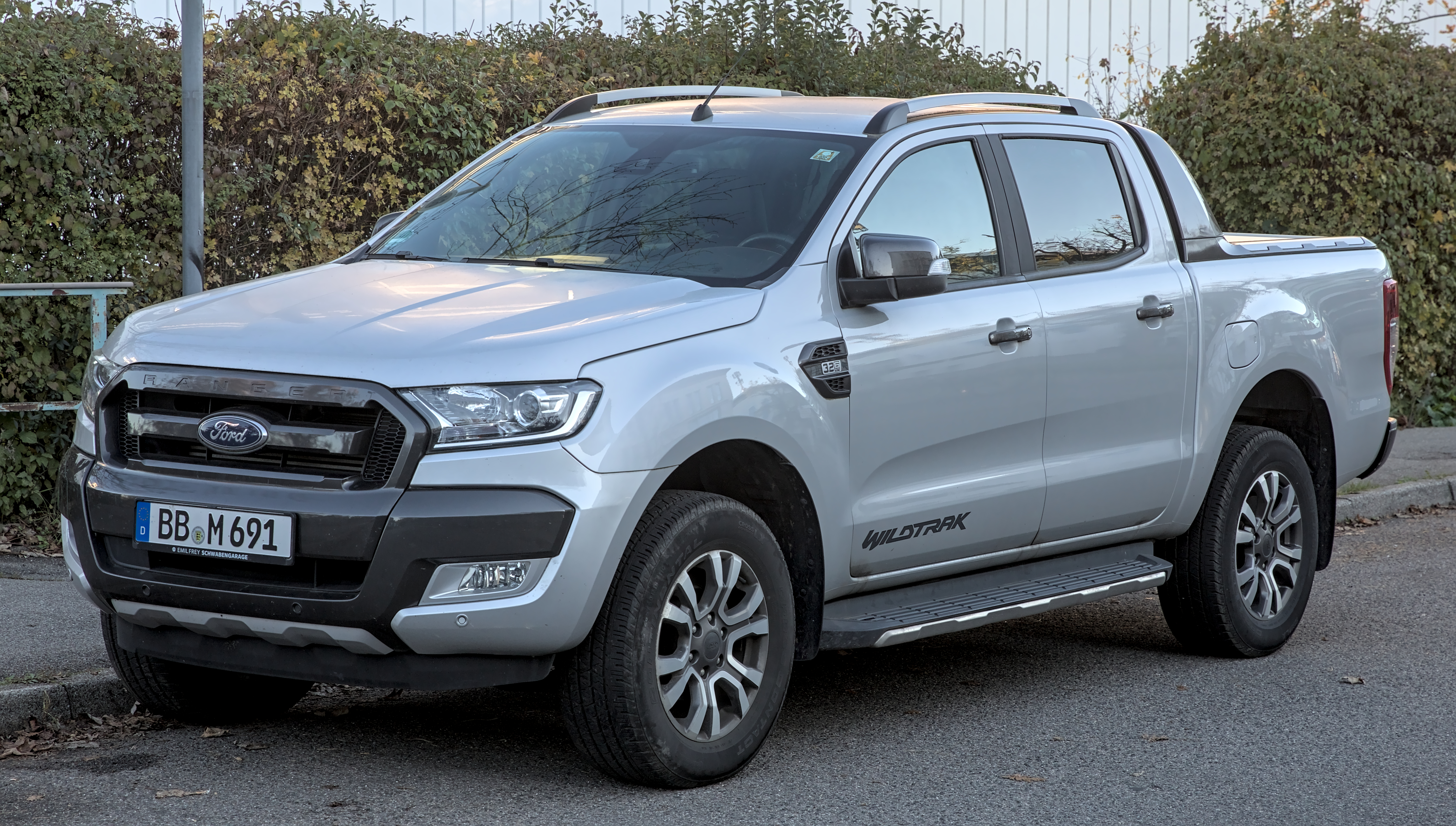
2017 Ranger Wildtrak (first facelift)

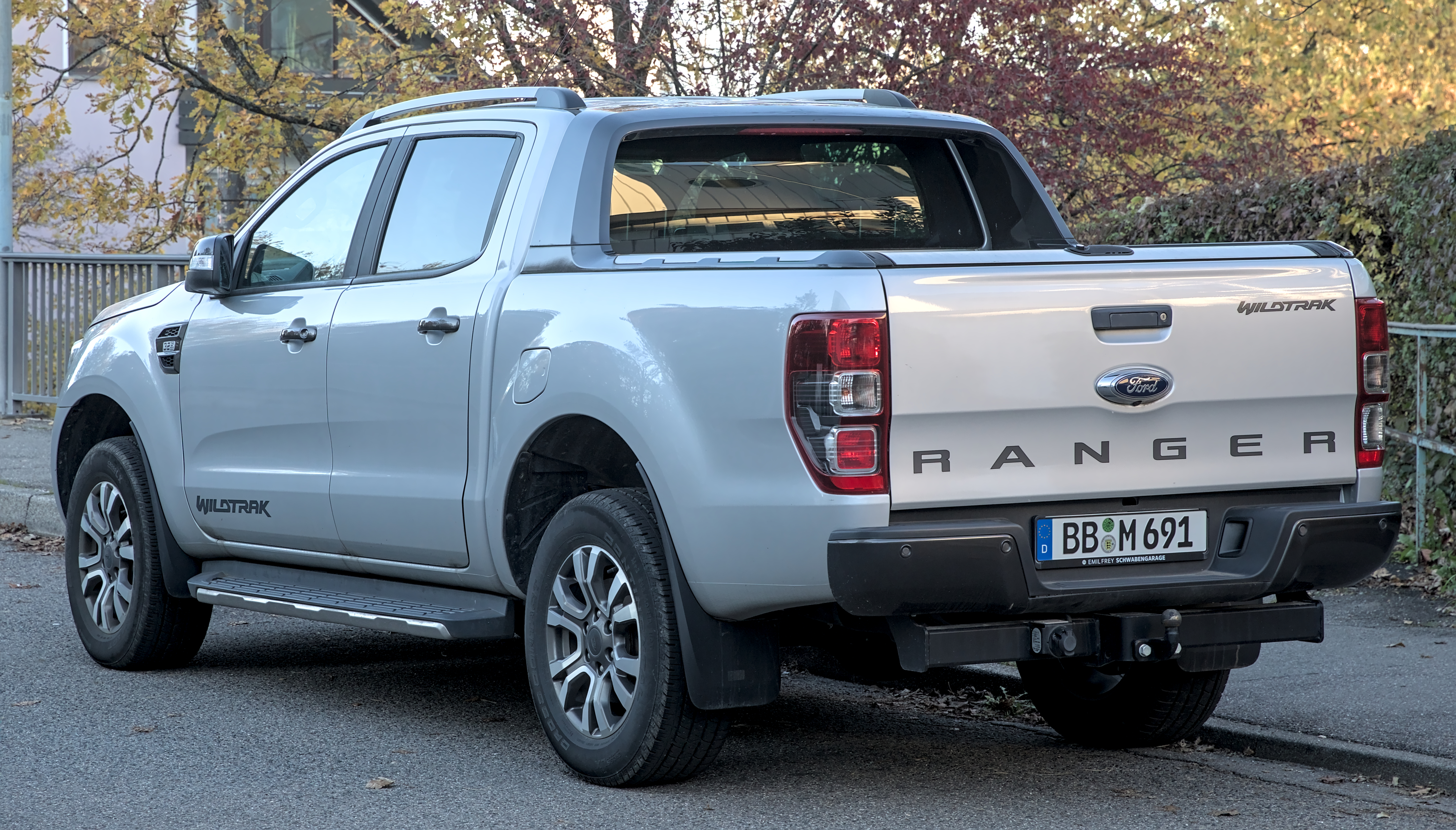
2017 Ranger Wildtrak (first facelift)

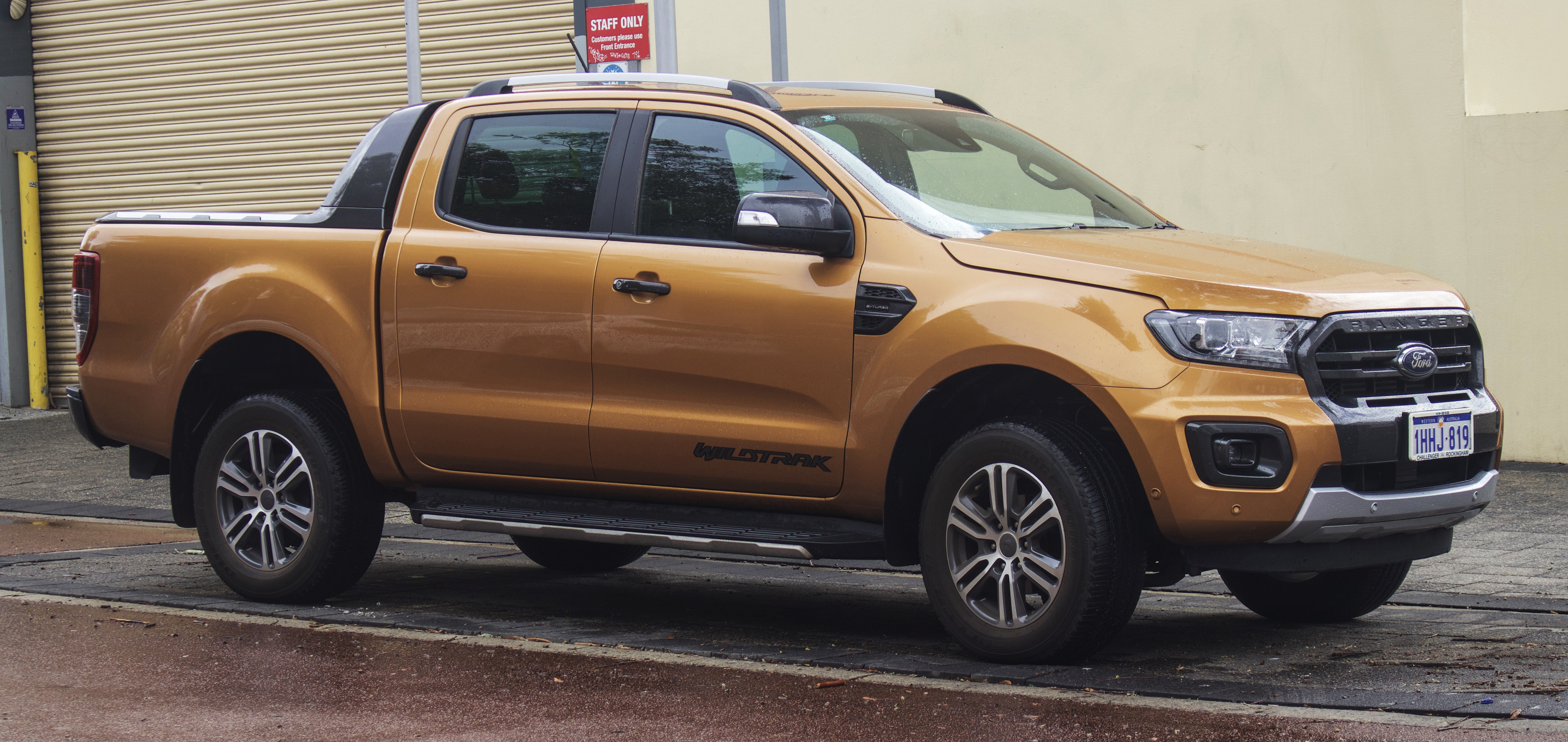
Ranger Wildtrak (second facelift)

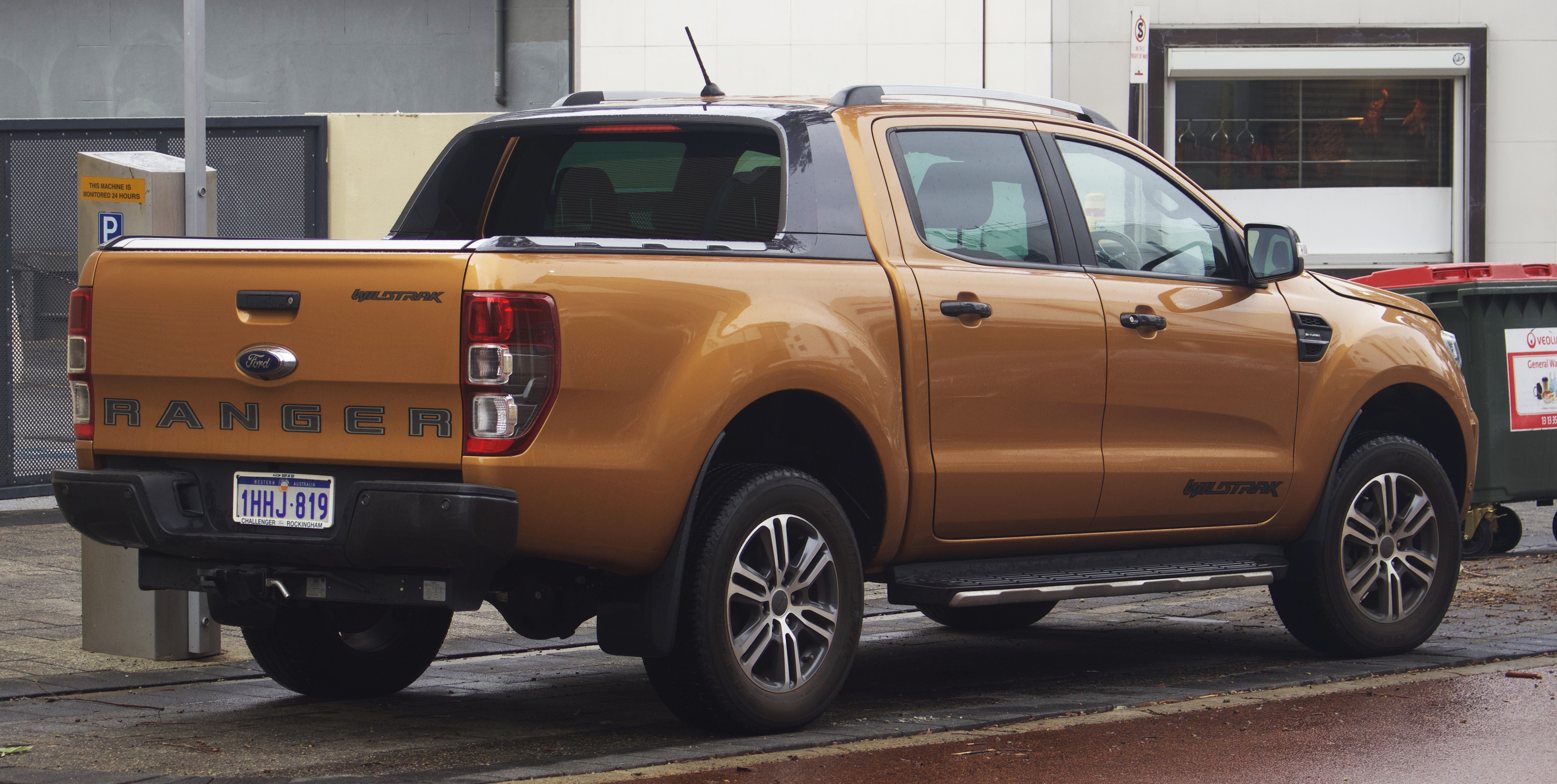
Ranger Wildtrak (second facelift)

==== Raptor ====
Unveiled in Thailand in February 2018, the Ranger Raptor is a high-performance truck optimized for off-road driving similar to the larger F-150 Raptor. Marking the debut of the 210 hp 2.0-litre EcoBlue bi-turbo diesel engine in the Ranger paired to a 10-speed automatic transmission, the Raptor is equipped with standard four-wheel drive and upgraded chassis and suspension. As with the F-150 Raptor, the grille of the Ranger Raptor replaces the Ford blue oval logo with "FORD" in block letters. The first-generation Ranger Raptor was not available in North America, with Ford citing that the Ranger Raptor was designed specifically for markets where the F-150 Raptor is not available; Ford also cited the cost of redesigning the truck to accommodate a more powerful petrol engine for the US market.

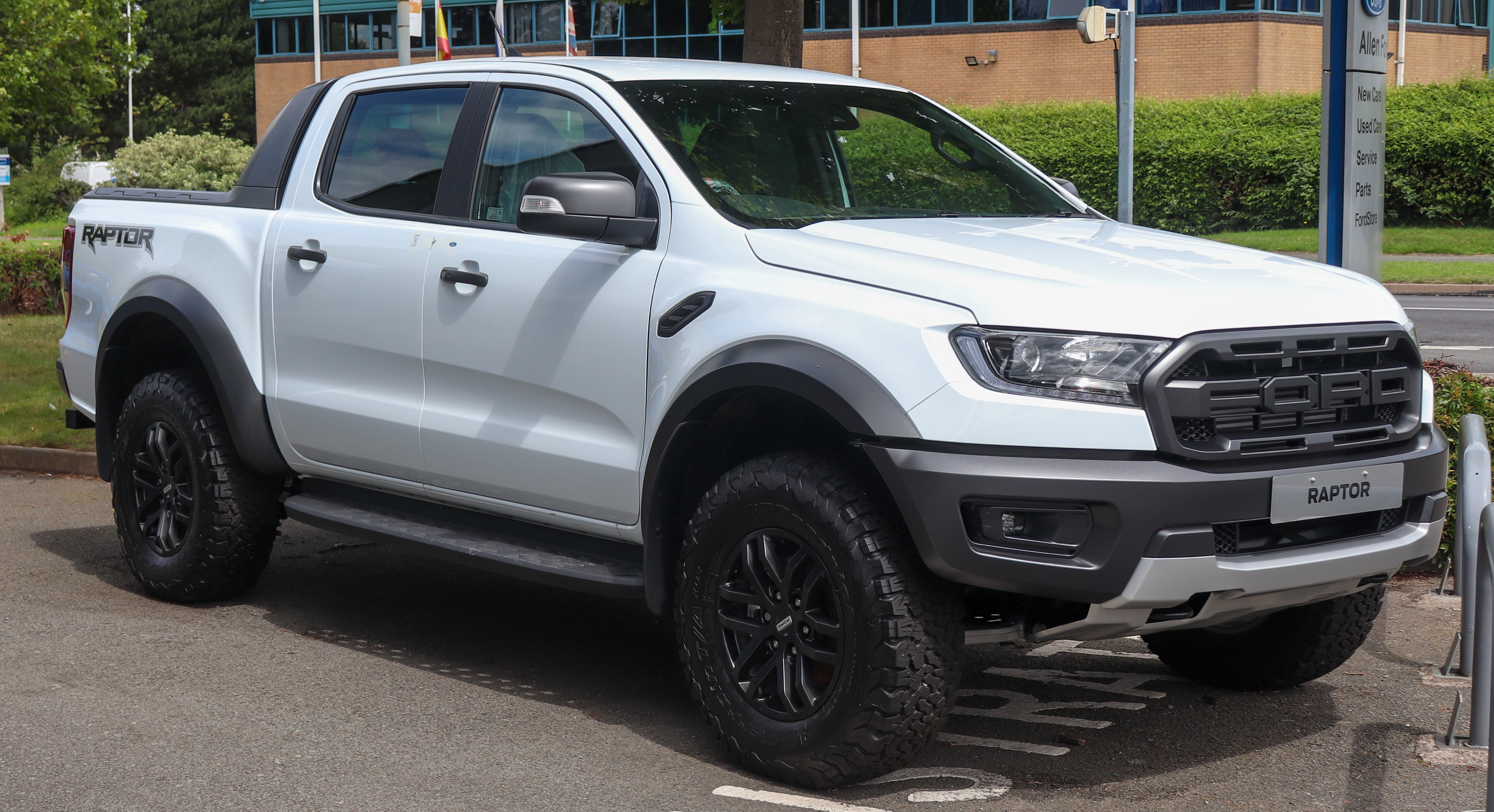
2020 Ranger Raptor

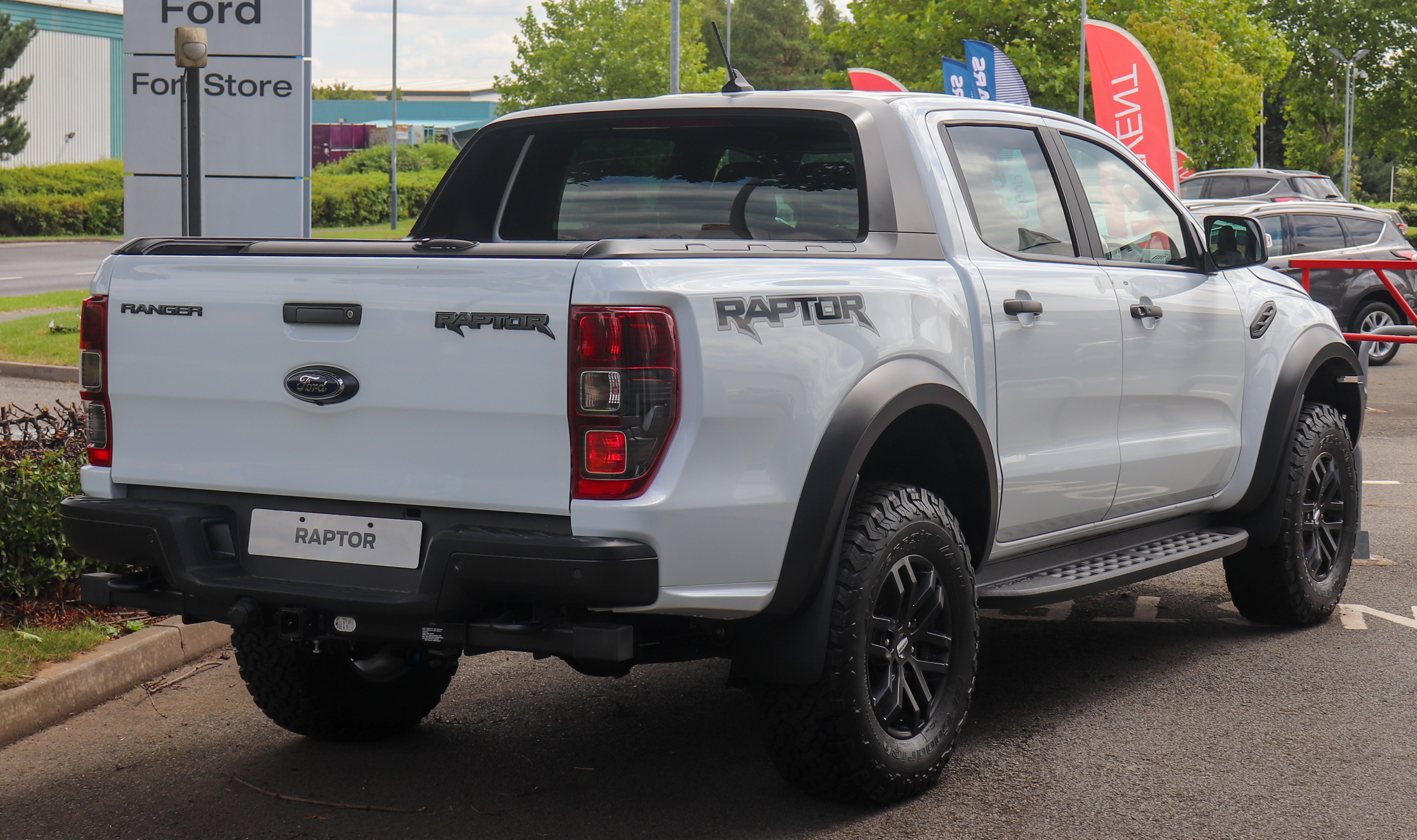
Rear view

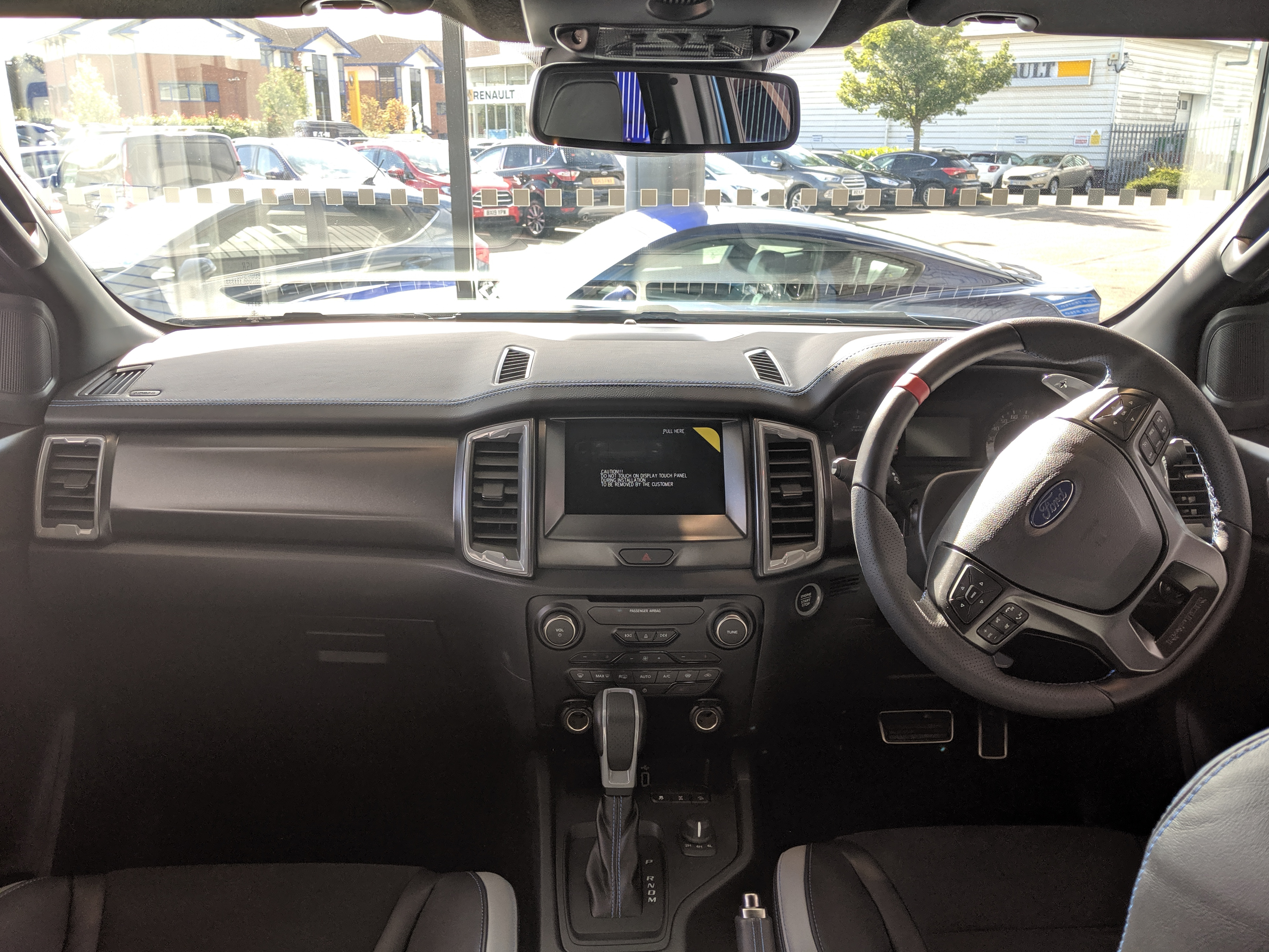
Interior

=== Safety ===
The first-generation T6-based Ranger is equipped with six airbags (seven in Europe). Along with dual front and side airbags, the Ranger is equipped with curtain airbags; European versions are equipped with a driver-side knee airbag. Along with standard anti-lock brakes, the Ranger is equipped with emergency brake assist. The twin-piston 11.9 in (302 mm) by 1.3 in (32 mm) front brake rotors are joined by 10.6 in (270 mm) by 2.2 in (55 mm) rear drums (on two-wheel drive Rangers) and 11.6 in (295 mm) by 2.2 in (55 mm) rear drums (on Hi-Rider and all 4x4 Rangers). The Latin American Ranger is equipped with rear drum brakes.

Australian-market XLT and WildTrak variants have the optional Tech Pack which includes adaptive cruise control, lane keeping aid, lane departure warning, automatic high beams, front windscreen mounted camera and a radar placed in the front right side of the grille.

The Ranger in its most basic Latin American market configuration with 3 airbags and no ESC received 3 stars for adult occupants and 4 stars for infants from Latin NCAP 2.0 in 2016.

Latin NCAP 2.0 test results Ford Ranger + 3 Airbags (2016, based on Euro NCAP 2008)
Test	Points	Stars
Adult occupant:	30.62/34.0	3 /5 stars
Child occupant:	40.17/49.00	4 /5 stars

The Ranger in its most basic Latin American market configuration with 3 airbags received 4 stars for adult occupants and 4 stars for infants from Latin NCAP 2.0 in 2019.

Latin NCAP 2.0 test results Ford Ranger + 3 Airbags (From Dic 2019) (2019, based on Euro NCAP 2008)
Test	Points	Stars
Adult occupant:	30.62/34.0	4 /5 stars
Child occupant:	39.67/49.00	4 /5 stars

ANCAP test results* Ford Ranger 4x2 single cab chassis (2011)
Test	Score
Overall	4 /5 stars
Frontal offset	15.72/16
Side impact	16/16
Pole	Not Assessed
Seat belt reminders	1/3
Whiplash protection	Not Assessed
Pedestrian protection	Adequate
Electronic stability control	Standard

ANCAP test results* Ford Ranger variants with side curtain airbags (2011)
Test	Score
Overall	5 /5 stars
Frontal offset	15.72/16
Side impact	16/16
Pole	Not Assessed
Seat belt reminders	2/3
Whiplash protection	Not Assessed
Pedestrian protection	Adequate
Electronic stability control	Standard

ANCAP test results* Ford Ranger (2014)
Test	Score
Overall	5 /5 stars
Frontal offset	15.72/16
Side impact	16/16
Pole	2/2
Seat belt reminders	2/3
Whiplash protection	Adequate
Pedestrian protection	Adequate
Electronic stability control	Standard

ANCAP test results* Ford Ranger (2014)
Test	Score
Overall	5 /5 stars
Frontal offset	15.72/16
Side impact	16/16
Pole	2/2
Seat belt reminders	3/3
Whiplash protection	Good
Pedestrian protection	Adequate
Electronic stability control	Standard

ASEAN NCAP test results Ford Ranger (2015)
Test	Points	Stars
Adult occupant:	15.45	4 /5 stars
Child occupant:	81%	3 /5 stars
Safety assist:	NA	

ASEAN NCAP test results Ford Ranger (2015)
Test	Points	Stars
Adult occupant:	15.45	5 /5 stars
Child occupant:	81%	3 /5 stars
Safety assist:	NA	

=== Awards ===
In January 2021, the Ford Ranger Double Cab 2.0 EcoBlue 213 Wildtrak auto was named Pick-up of the Year by British magazine What Car?. What Car? awarded the Ranger five stars out of five in its review of the vehicle.

=== North America ===
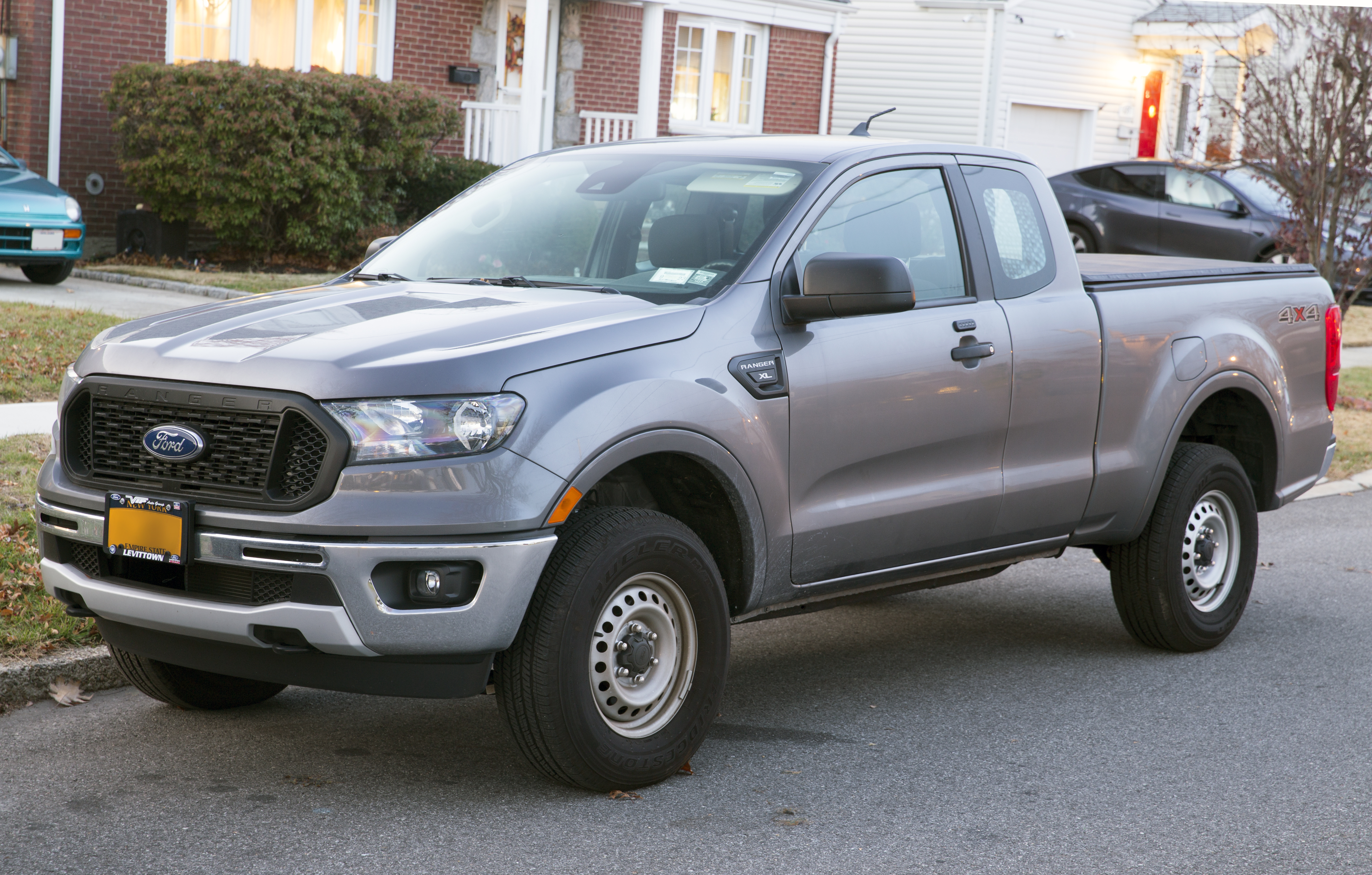
2021 Ford Ranger XL SuperCab

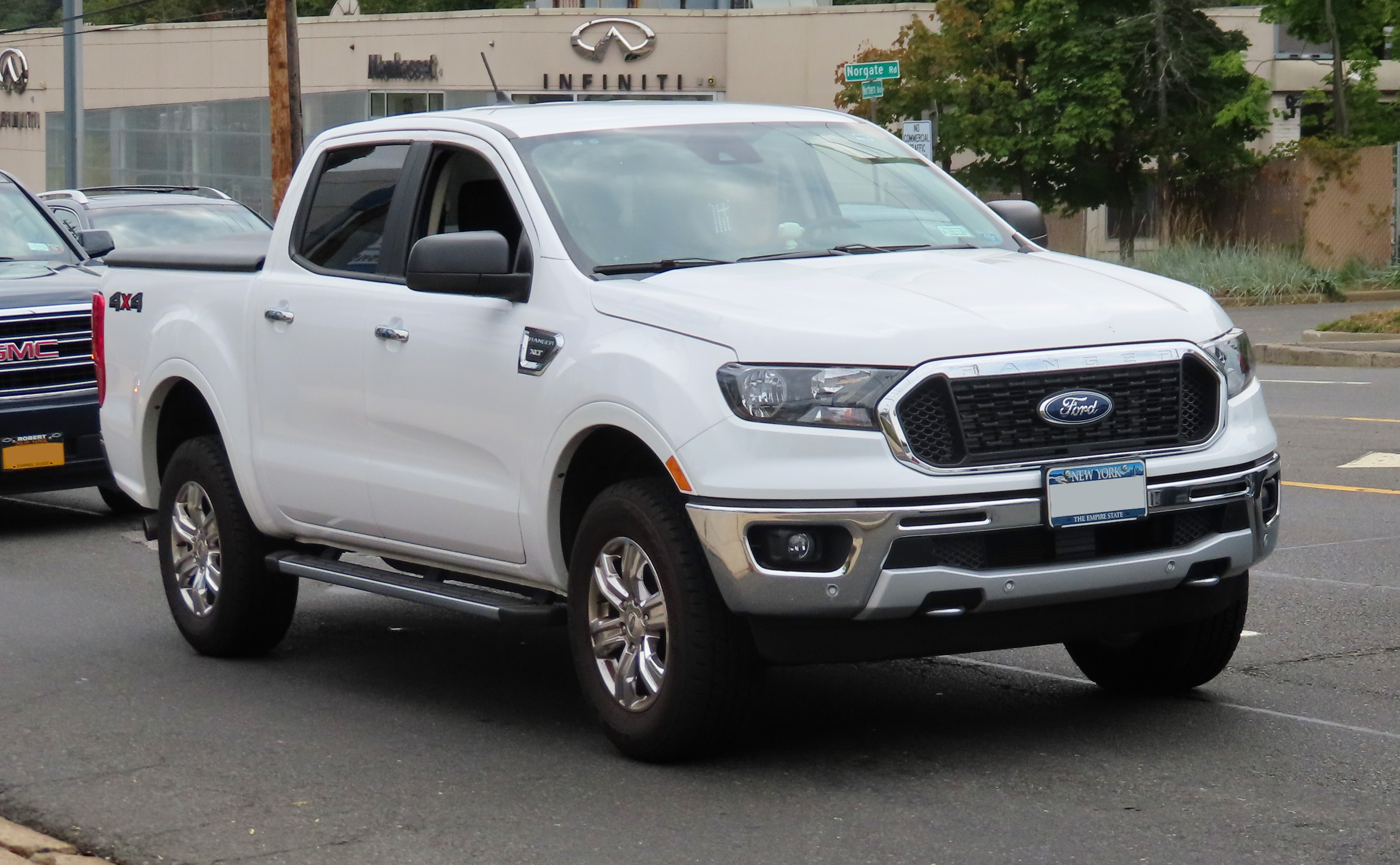
2019 Ford Ranger XLT SuperCrew

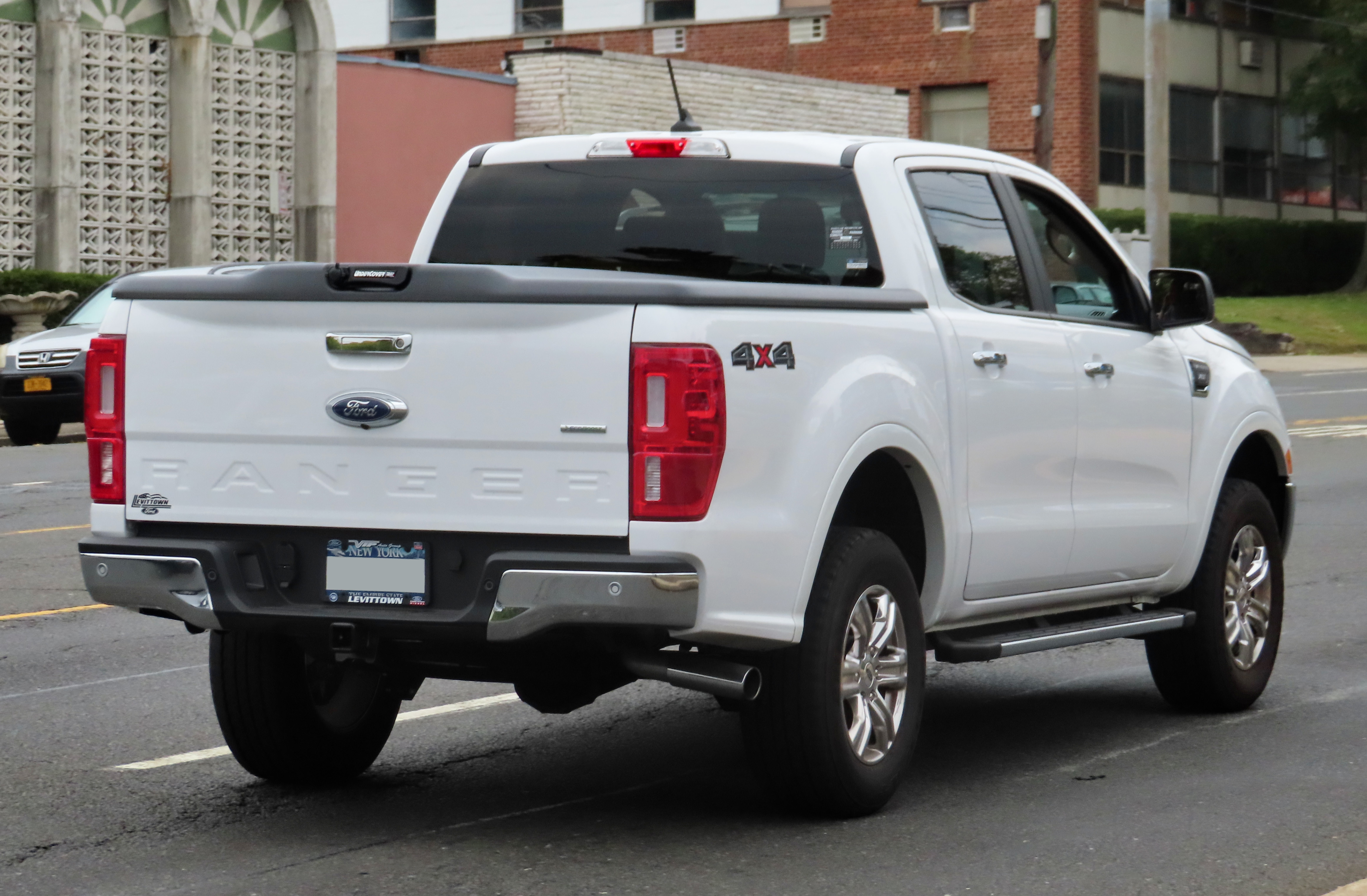
Rear view

For its 2011 launch, the first-generation T6-based Ranger replaced previous generations of the Ranger worldwide, consolidating designs developed by Ford and Mazda. A notable exception included the United States and Canada, as Ford exited the compact truck segment entirely. During the early 2010s, Ford concentrated its light truck design resources in North America on its F-Series trucks, with its redesign for 2015 including an aluminium-intensive body and introducing direct-injection and turbocharged engines in an effort to improve fuel economy.

After an eight-year market hiatus, Ford introduced the fourth-generation Ranger for the United States or Canada for the 2019 model year at the 2018 North American International Auto Show, marking the first Ford entry into the mid-size pickup truck segment since the discontinuation of the Explorer Sport Trac. As the first mid-size Ranger sold in North America, the Ranger underwent several design modifications to accommodate US crash standards along with the increase of its payload, with the introduction of fully boxed frame rails. All versions of the Ranger sold in the United States and Canada have a 127 in (3,226 mm) wheelbase, regardless of cab or drivetrain configuration. Production started on 29 October 2018.

The North American-market Ranger is sold in four-door SuperCab and four-door SuperCrew configurations. While externally similar to its global counterpart, the Ranger features a number of exterior design changes. The front fascia was redesigned with a frame-mounted steel bumper. At the minor expense of frontal aerodynamics, the sturdier front bumper was designed to better comply with American crash standards.

To better market the vehicle towards private buyers in North America, the Ranger was given a distinct bonnet design and grilles related to trim level. Additional trim included colour-contrasting fender molding and fender grilles, in line with the F-Series trucks. The "RANGER"-embossed tailgate was modified; in the interest of aerodynamics, a spoiler was added. Unlike the F-Series, usage of aluminium in the body is minor, with only an aluminium bonnet and tailgate.

While offered in both rear-wheel drive and part-time four-wheel drive, all Rangers in North America are produced using the "HiRider" chassis of the Ranger 4x4. Ford did not introduce the Ranger Raptor and the Ranger Wildtrak in North America. Ford has no current plans to market a two-door Ranger in North America.

To comply with American safety mandates, a rear view safety camera is standard. Several sizes of interior touchscreens are offered, depending on trim packages ordered. To increase interior storage, waterproof storage compartments were added under the rear seats.

==== Powertrain ====
For the North American market, the Ranger is produced with a single powertrain: a 2.3-litre EcoBoost inline-four paired with 10-speed 10R80 automatic transmission. For increased fuel economy, the engine includes direct fuel injection, four valves per cylinder, and a twin-scroll turbocharger.

Engine	Production	Configuration	Output		Transmission
Engine	Production	Configuration	Horsepower	Torque	Transmission
Ford EcoBoost 2.3	2019–present	2.3 L (138 cu in) DOHC inline-4 Twin-scroll turbo	201 kW (270 hp)	420 N⋅m (310 lb⋅ft)	10R80 10-speed automatic

==== Trim levels ====
The fourth-generation Ranger shares the traditional trim levels used by Ford light trucks in North America, with base-trim XL, mid-level XLT, and top-trim Lariat. To supplement each trim level, Chrome, Sport, and FX option packages are offered for all three trim levels.

There are several different appearance packages available for each trim level. The base XL trim offers the STX Appearance Package, while the mid-level XLT and range-topping Lariat trims offer two different appearance packages: either the Sport Appearance Package or the Chrome Appearance Package. An FX-4 Off-Road Package is available on all 4x4-equipped models, adding features such as side pickup box FX-4 Off-Road decals, an off-road suspension package, and on/off-road tires.

An off-road focused trim package called the Tremor was unveiled in September 2020 for the 2021 model year. Reserved for the XLT or Lariat trims with 4x4 and the SuperCrew chassis, the Tremor off-road package offers updated suspension tuned for off-road use with FOX Dampers, multi-leaf rear springs, a terrain management system with trail control, 17-inch painted aluminium wheels with 32-inch off-road all-terrain General Grabber ATx tires, bash plates with skid plates for the radiator, EPAS, transfer case and fuel tank, rear tow hooks (deleted w/ tow package), updated LED data cluster, custom seats with Tremor logo, six upfitter switches mounted top centre console and optional side, bonnet and tailgate graphics, and red accented grille.

== Second generation (P703/RA; 2022) ==
Second generation
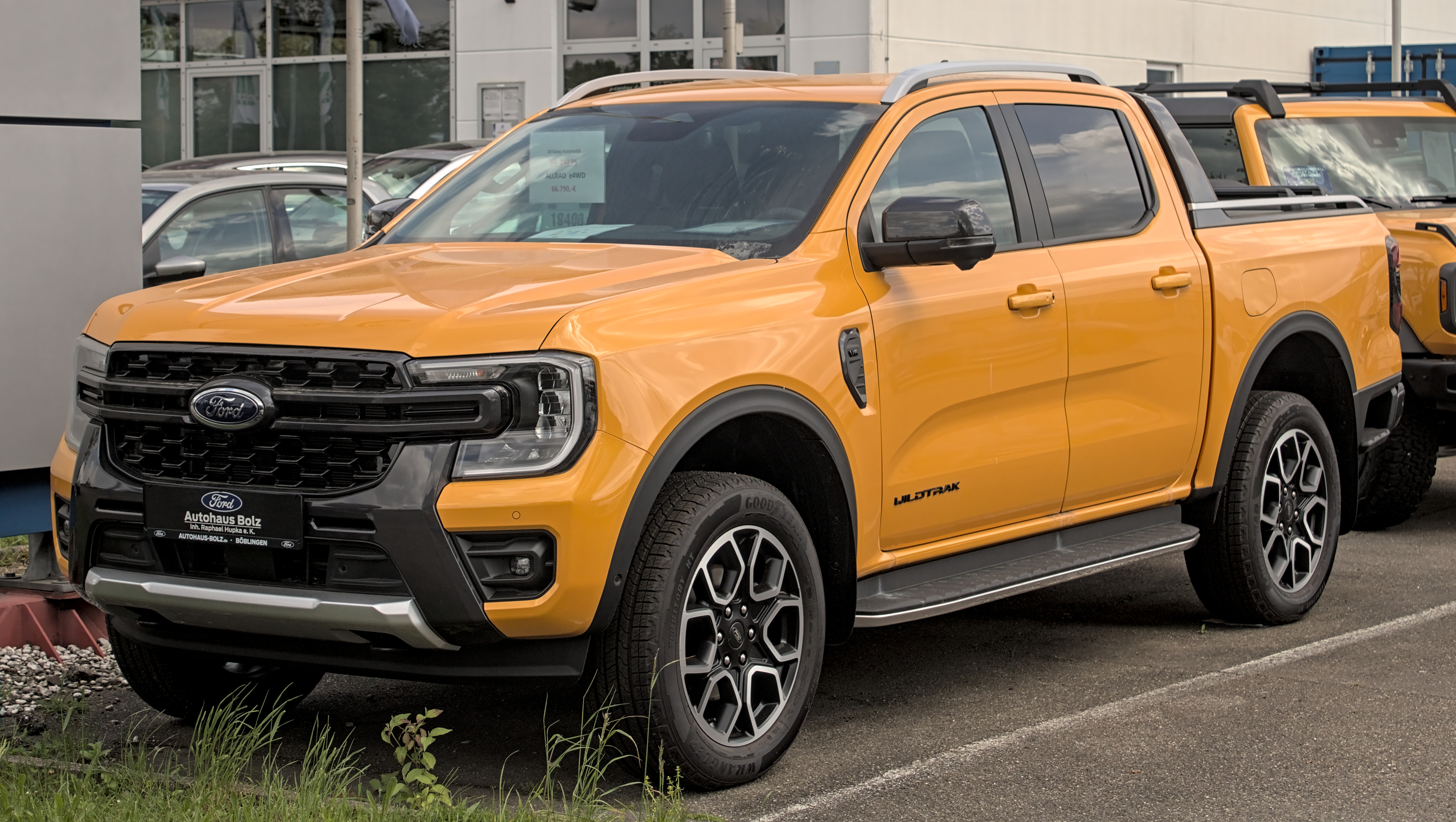
- Ranger Wildtrak

Overview
- Model code: RA P703A (Thailand); RB P703M (South Africa); RC P703S (Argentina); RD P703N (North America); P789 (China)
- Production: May 2022 – present
- Model years: 2024–present (North America)
- Assembly: Thailand: Rayong (AAT); Rayong (FTM); United States: Wayne, Michigan (Michigan Assembly Plant); South Africa: Silverton, Pretoria (Ford South Africa); Argentina: General Pacheco (Ford Argentina); Vietnam: Hai Duong (Ford Vietnam); China: Nanchang (Jiangling Ford Auto); Cambodia: Pursat (Ford Cambodia)
- Designer: Max Tran (chief designer)

Body and chassis
- Related: Volkswagen Amarok Mk2; Ford Everest (U704); Ford Bronco (U725)

Powertrain
- Engine: Petrol: 2.3 L EcoBoost I4 turbo; 2.7 L EcoBoost V6 twin-turbo; 3.0 L EcoBoost V6 twin-turbo (Raptor); Petrol plug-in hybrid: 2.3 L EcoBoost I4 turbo; Diesel: 2.0 L EcoBlue I4 turbo; 2.0 L EcoBlue I4 twin-turbo; 3.0 L Power Stroke V6 turbo
- Electric motor: 75kW (PHEV)
- Transmission: 6-speed manual; 6-speed 6R80 automatic; 10-speed 10R60 automatic; 10-speed 10R80 automatic
- Battery: 11.8 kWh usable (PHEV)
- Plug-in charging: V2L: 6.9kW (PHEV)

Dimensions
- Wheelbase: 3,270 mm (128.7 in)
- Length: Standard: 5,225–5,370 mm (205.7–211.4 in); Raptor: 5,381 mm (211.9 in)
- Width: Standard: 1,910–1,918 mm (75.2–75.5 in); Raptor: 2,028 mm (79.8 in)
- Height: Standard: 1,866–1,920 mm (73.5–75.6 in); Raptor: 1,926 mm (75.8 in)
- Kerb weight: 1,783–2,475 kg (3,931–5,456 lb)

The second-generation T6-based Ranger (fourth-generation Ranger worldwide and fifth-generation Ranger in North America) debuted in November 2021. Codenamed P703 during development, and also known by the RA model code in Australia and Thailand, it continued to be developed by Ford Australia with heavy inputs from Asian, North American, African and European subsidiaries of Ford. It has been produced starting from the second quarter of 2022 in Thailand and South Africa for more than 100 global markets.

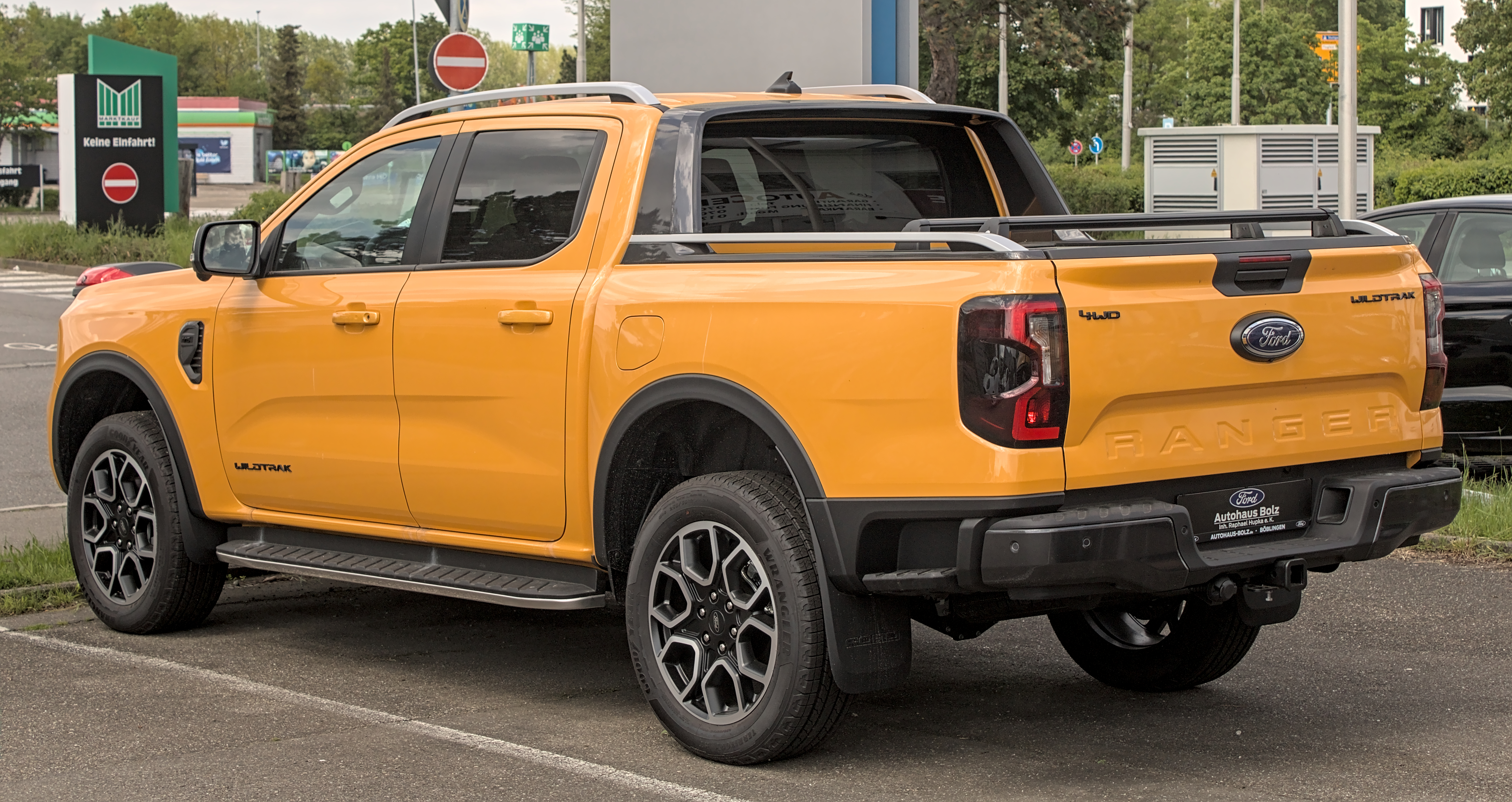
Ranger Wildtrak

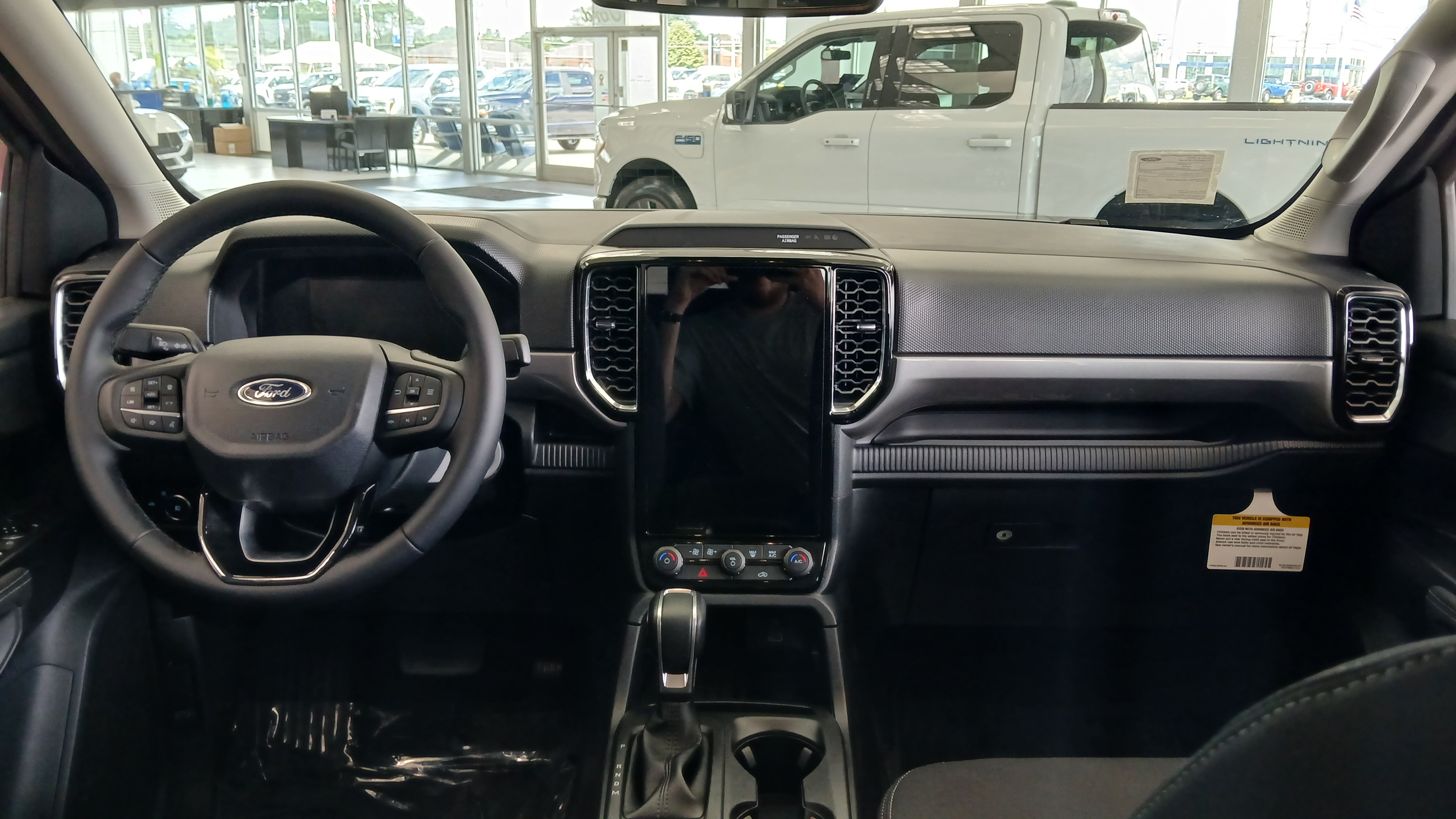
Interior

Dubbed the "T6.2", the vehicle is not completely reengineered with the use of the same basic body shapes and dimensions, door and glass apertures, most chassis hardpoints, along with many engine and transmission options. However, most parts are not directly interchangeable with the previous Ranger, according to Ian Foston, chief platform engineer for T6.

The P703 Ranger features an upgraded chassis, an added wheelbase and wider tracks of 50 mm (2.0 in) each, and an all-new suspension which has been placed further outboard. The change allows for more room for spring/damper articulation, which improves ride and handling capabilities regardless of load, and 4x4 off-road capability due to greater wheel travel. The engine bay is also wholly reworked with hydroformed structure to allow for the fitment of the V6 engine, a Power Stroke 3.0-litre turbodiesel unit which is first introduced for the 2018 F-150 but heavily modified for Ranger. The vehicle also introduced a wider bed, allowing for a standard pallet (1.2 m x 0.8 m) to fit.

The model shares its underpinnings with the third-generation Ford Everest and the second-generation Volkswagen Amarok. As part of Ford-VW global alliance cooperation agreement, Volkswagen has been involved with the development of the P703 Ranger since 2017.

=== Powertrain ===
Fuel	Engine	Production	Configuration	Output	Torque	Transmission
Petrol	2.3 L EcoBoost I4	2022–present	2.3 L inline-4 turbocharged petrol	270 hp (201 kW)	420 Nm (310 lb·ft)	10-speed automatic
Petrol	2.7 L EcoBoost V6	2024–present	2.7 L V6 twin-turbocharged petrol	~315 hp (235 kW)	~542 Nm (400 lb·ft)	10-speed automatic
Petrol	3.0 L EcoBoost V6	2022–present (Raptor)	3.0 L V6 twin-turbocharged petrol	Higher output (market-dependent)	Higher torque (market-dependent)	10-speed automatic
Diesel	2.0 L EcoBlue I4	2022–present	2.0 L inline-4 turbocharged diesel	170 hp (127 kW)	405 Nm	6-speed manual / 10-speed automatic
Diesel	2.0 L EcoBlue I4 twin-turbo	2022–present	2.0 L inline-4 twin-turbo diesel	205 hp (150 kW)	500 Nm	6-speed manual / 10-speed automatic
Diesel	3.0 L Power Stroke V6	2022–present	3.0 L V6 turbocharged diesel	241 hp (179 kW)	600 Nm	10-speed automatic

=== Tremor and Wildtrak X ===
The Ranger Wildtrak X debuted in March 2023 in Australia, featuring a wider track and higher ground clearance than the regular Wildtrak. In the same month, the Ranger Tremor and Wildtrak X trims were launched in Europe, featuring higher ground clearance, longer suspension travel and more advanced off-road systems.

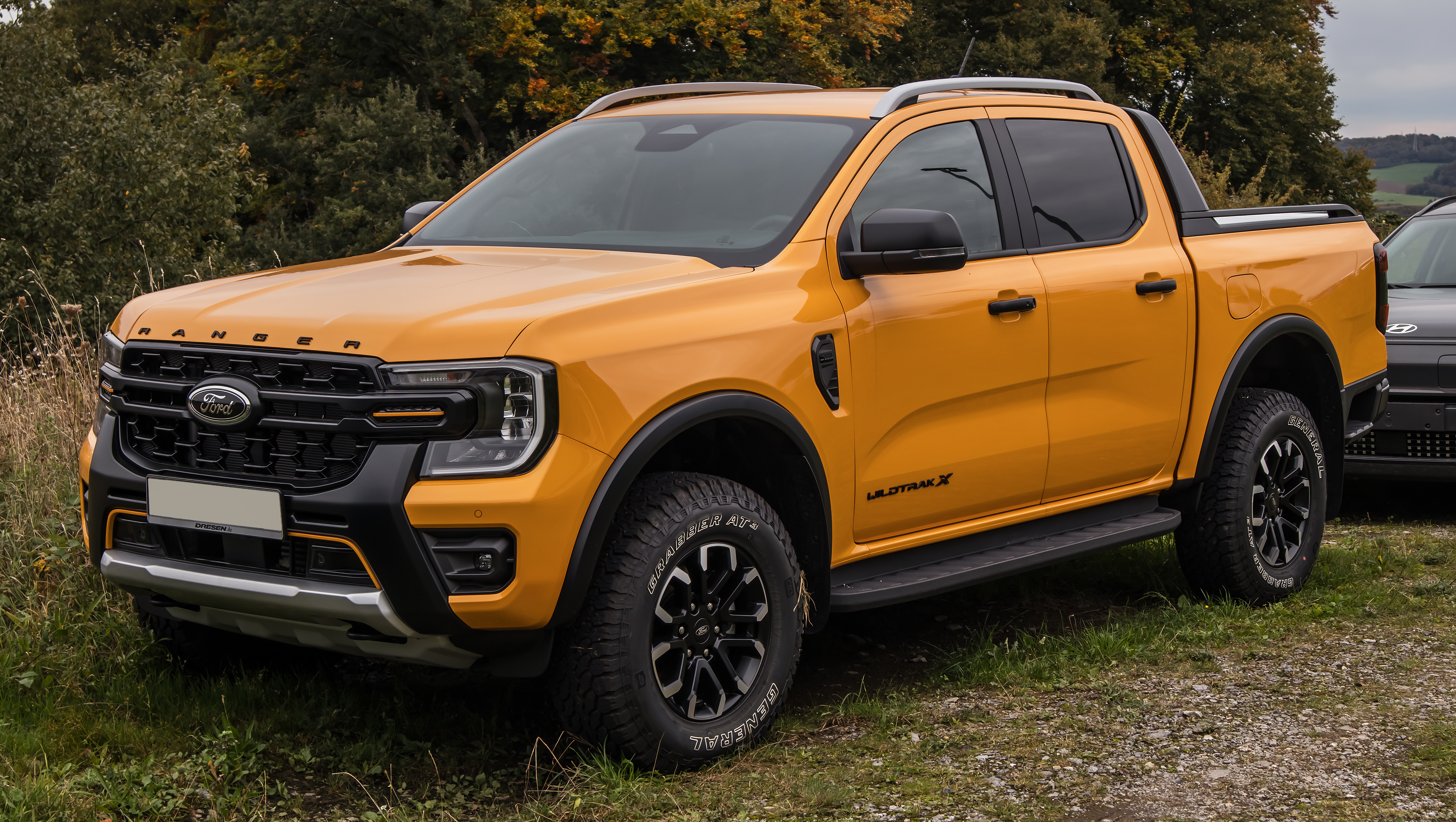
Ranger Wildtrak X

Ranger Tremor

=== Raptor ===
The second-generation Ranger Raptor was unveiled in February 2022. It is powered by a 3.0-litre V6 EcoBoost twin-turbocharged petrol engine from the Bronco Raptor paired with a 10R60 automatic transmission. Power outputs are rated at 292 kW (392 hp) for the Australian market while the output for European market is limited to 210 kW (282 hp) to meet EU emissions standards. Ford CEO Jim Farley confirmed that the second-generation Ranger Raptor will be sold in the United States and Canada starting in 2023. The North American Ranger Raptor's power output is rated at 302 kW (405 hp).

In the UK, the Ford Ranger Raptor is available with two engine options: the 2.0-litre four-cylinder EcoBlue turbocharged diesel engine with 210PS and the 3.0-litre V6 EcoBoost twin-turbocharged petrol engine with 292PS.

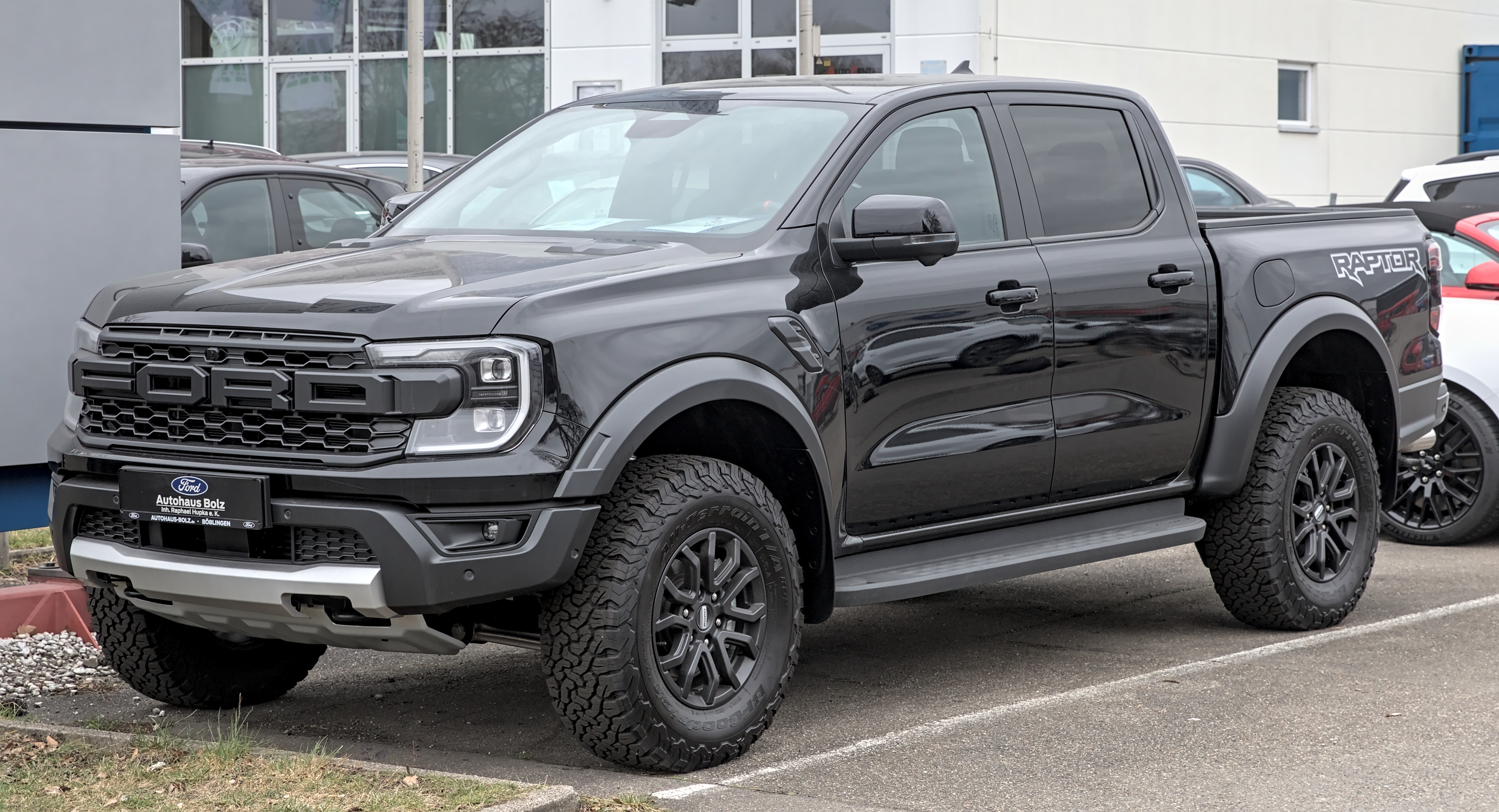
Ranger Raptor

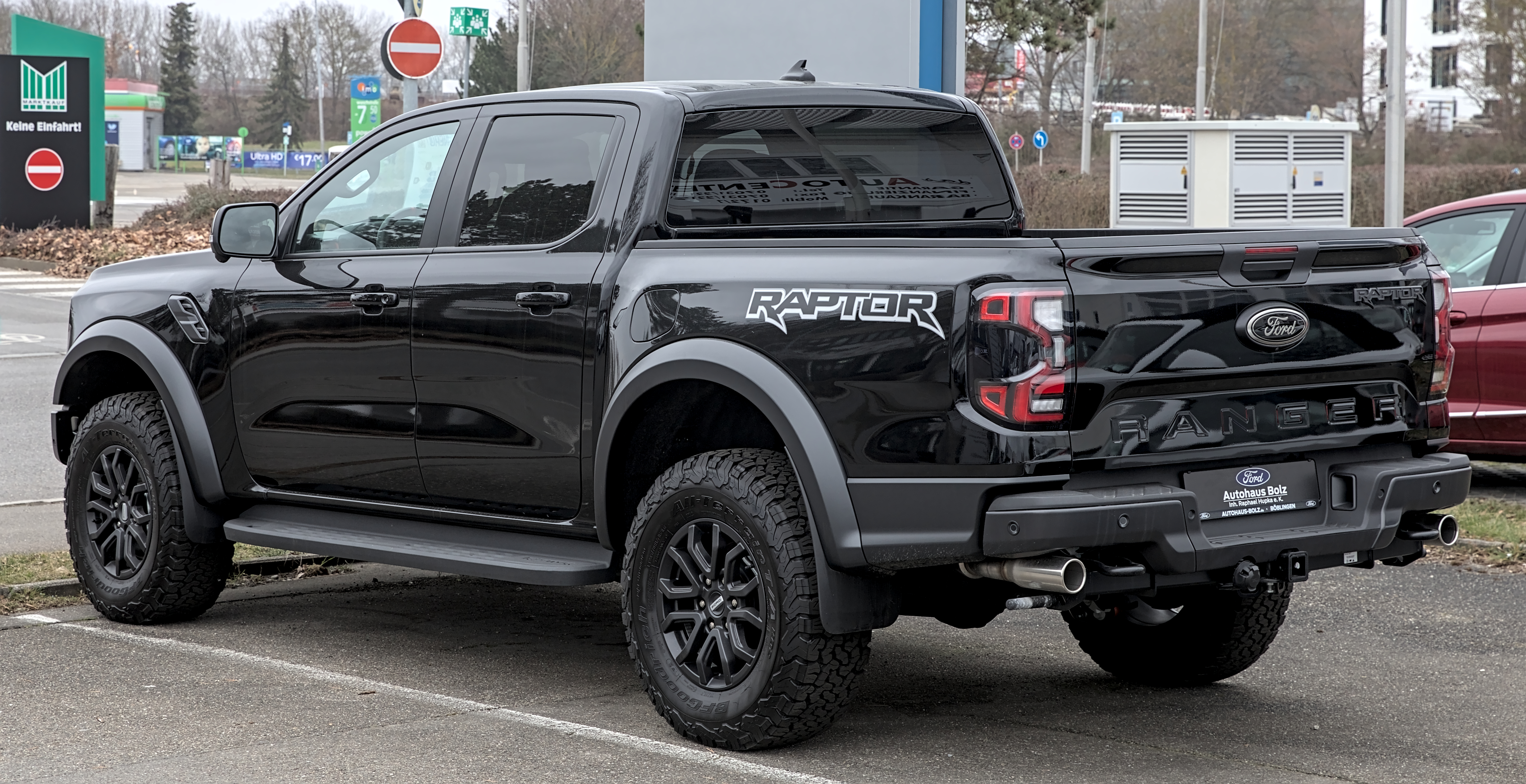
Rear view

=== Plug-in electric hybrid ===
In September 2023, Ford unveiled a plug-in hybrid version of the Ranger. The Ranger PHEV is powered by the 2.3-litre EcoBoost petrol mated with a 75kW electric motor and 11.7kWh rechargeable battery system, with an expected all-electric range of 45 km (28 miles); the hybrid powertrain produces 271 hp (202 kW) and 690 N⋅m (509 lb⋅ft) of torque, producing more torque than the 3.0-litre Power Stroke turbo-diesel and the Raptor's 3.0-litre EcoBoost twin-turbo petrol. The Ranger PHEV is manufactured in South Africa due to tooling constraints at the Thailand plant. A North American release is presently not planned, with Ford citing the availability of the Maverick hybrid as well as the F-150 hybrid and fully electric F-150 Lightning.

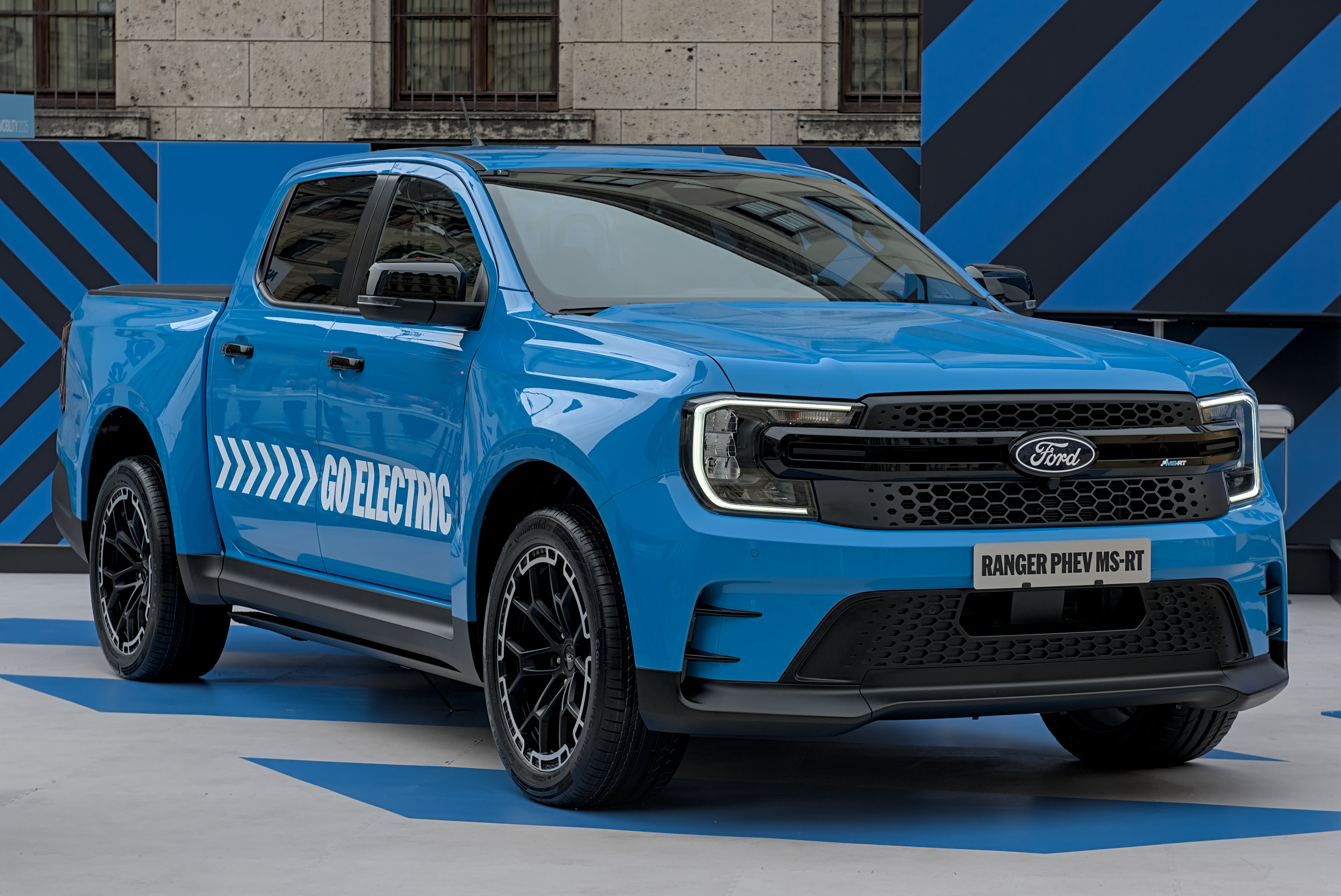
Ranger MS-RT PHEV

=== Super Duty ===
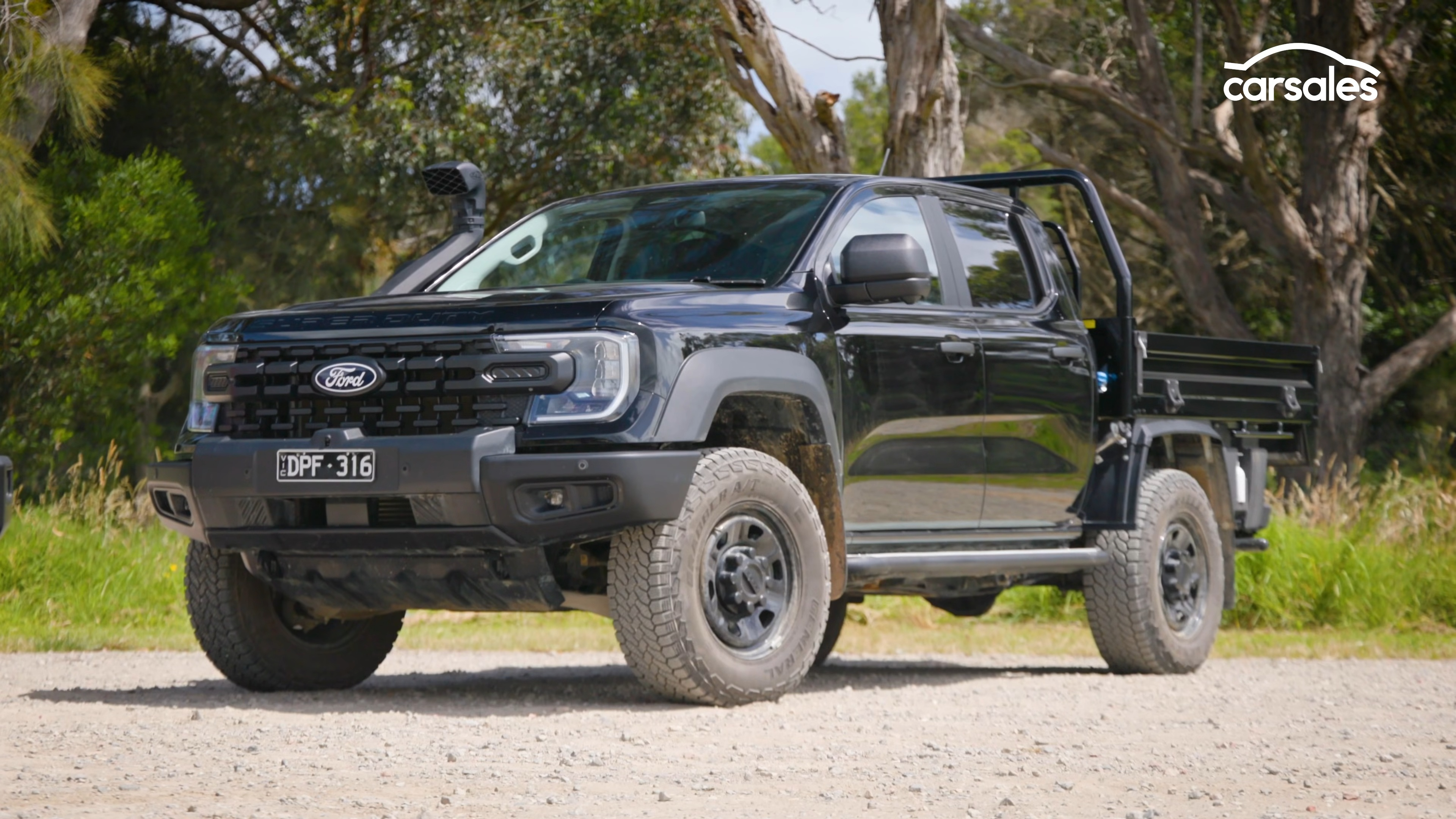
Ford Ranger Super Duty double cab chassis

The Ford Ranger Super Duty was officially unveiled on 4 April 2025. It is primarily designed for fleet and industrial customers needing greater towing and hauling capabilities than what the standard Ranger offers, but the F-150 is either not available or prohibitively expensive in a specific market, such as Australia, where the F-150 is manufactured in the United States in its native left-hand drive configuration and subsequently converted to right-hand drive post-import. The Ranger Super Duty will not be offered in North America due to its similar capabilities to the F-150. It is manufactured in Thailand, and was first released in the Australian market, with other global markets to follow, and has since launched in Thailand.

It has a braked towing capacity of 4,500 kg (9,920 lb), a gross vehicle mass (GVM) of 4,500 kg (9,920 lb), the maximum allowed on an Australian passenger car license,, a maximum payload capacity of 1,982 kg (4,370 lb), and a gross combination mass of 8,000 kg (17,640 lb). It features 8-lug wheels from the F-250, the 3.0-litre Power Stroke engine, producing 154 kW (207 hp) and 600 N⋅m (443 lb⋅ft), a 130 L (34 US gal) fuel tank, locking front and rear differentials, onboard scales fitted onto the rear bed, and a snorkel.

=== Markets ===
==== Europe ====
The second-generation Ranger (T6) was released in the European market in November 2022 and customer deliveries commenced in the same month starting with the Raptor model. In Europe, it is available in Single Cab, Double Cab or Chassis Cab bodies.

In 2024, the Ranger became the best-selling pick-up truck in Europe for 10 consecutive years with 60,400 units sold in the region, represents a 43.6% market share in its segment and an increase in annual sales by 4%.

The Ranger Super Duty is planned to release in Europe before the end of 2026.

==== Latin America ====
===== Argentina =====
The second-generation Ranger (T6) was launched in Argentina on 23 June 2023, with five trim levels available at launch: XL, XLS, XLT, Limited and Limited Plus. For engines, it is available with a 2.0-litre Ecoblue single-turbo, 2.0-litre Ecoblue bi-turbo, and a 3.0-litre V6 turbo-diesel (only for the Limited Plus trim). The XL, XLS and XLT trims comes standard with two-wheel drive and are available with four-wheel drive as an option, while the Limited and Limited Plus comes standard with four-wheel drive. In Argentina, all variants comes as a Double Cab body.

In February 2024, the Raptor model using the 3.0-litre V6 EcoBoost twin-turbo petrol engine, was added to the line-up.

In August 2024, the Black special edition model, features black exterior and interior accents and using the 2.0-litre Ecoblue single-turbo engine (4WD), was added to the line-up.

===== Brazil =====
The second-generation Ranger (T6) was launched in Brazil on 22 June 2023, with four grades: XL, XLS, XLT and Limited. For engines, the XL and XLS grades use the 2.0-litre Ecoblue single-turbo engine, while the XLT and Limited trims use the 3.0-litre V6 turbo-diesel engine, and the XLS trim became available with the latter engine option at a later date. Four-wheel drive is standard on all grades except for the XLS grade which is optional, the XLS grade comes standard with two-wheel drive. In Brazil, all variants comes as a Double Cab body.

In November 2023, the Raptor model using the 3.0-litre V6 EcoBoost twin-turbo petrol engine, was added to the line-up.

In October 2024, the Black special edition model using the 2.0-litre Ecoblue single-turbo engine (2WD), was added to the line-up.

===== Mexico =====
The second-generation Ranger (T6) went on sale in Mexico in February 2023. At launch, the Ranger was initially available as a Raptor model using the 3.0-litre V6 EcoBoost twin-turbo petrol engine.

In April 2023, four variants were added to the line-up: XL, XLT, XLT Diesel and Wildtrak. For engines, all variants except for the VLT Diesel use the 2.3-litre EcoBoost turbo petrol engine, while the XLT Diesel use the 2.0-litre Ecoblue single-turbo engine. The XL and XLT variants are two-wheel drive, while the XLT Diesel and Wildtrak variants are four-wheel drive. In Mexico, all variants comes as a Double Cab body.

==== Middle East ====
The second-generation Ranger (T6) was released in the Middle Eastern markets on 9 May 2023, with five variants available: XL-Low, XL-High, XLT, Wildtrak and Raptor. For engines, it is available with a 2.0-litre Ecoblue single-turbo used in the XL-Low, a 2.3-litre EcoBoost turbo petrol engine used in the XL-High, XLT and Wildtrak variants, and a 3.0-litre V6 EcoBoost twin-turbocharged petrol for the Raptor. In the Middle Eastern market, all variants comes as a Double Cab body.

==== North America ====
On 10 May 2023, Ford officially unveiled the North American version of the P703 Ranger. Unlike the previous generation, the P703 Ranger was engineered for the American market from the beginning of its development. While the North American Ranger is visually similar to its global counterpart, the third brake light is relocated from the tailgate to the top of the cab, and amber side markers are added to the front quarter panels.

The base XL, mid-level XLT, and premium Lariat trims carried over from the previous generation, while the performance-oriented Raptor model is also available, powered by the same 3.0-litre EcoBoost twin-turbocharged petrol V6 engine from the Explorer ST and Bronco Raptor. For 2024 XL models, the previously optional STX appearance package, which replaces the steel wheels with 17-inch aluminum-alloy wheels along with additional body-color trim and interior upgrades, was made standard. The 2.3-litre EcoBoost from the previous generation carries over as the truck's base engine, while the 2.7-litre twin-turbo EcoBoost V6 shared with the Bronco and F-150 is available as an optional engine on the XLT and Lariat trims, producing 235 kW (315 hp); regardless of engine choice, all North American Rangers are mated to the 10R60 10-speed automatic transmission. Order banks for the 2024 Ranger opened in late May 2023 with initial deliveries planned by the third quarter of 2023. However, the ongoing global supply chain crisis has delayed the 2024 Ranger's manufacturing start date several times, and the Ranger's production was halted by the 2023 United Auto Workers strike from mid-September to the end of October.

==== Oceania ====
===== Australia =====
The second-generation Ranger (T6) was launched in Australia on 19 July 2022, with six grades available at launch: XL, XLS, XLT, Sport, Wildtrak and Raptor. For engines, it is available with a 2.0-litre Ecoblue single-turbo, 2.0-litre Ecoblue bi-turbo, 3.0-litre V6 turbo-diesel and a 3.0-litre V6 EcoBoost twin-turbocharged petrol (only for the Raptor model); along with two-wheel and four-wheel drive. In Australia, it is available in Single, Super or Double Cab bodies, along with pick-up or cab-chassis configurations.

In November 2022, the flagship Platinum grade using the 3.0-litre V6 turbo-diesel (4WD) and in a Double Cab configuration, was added to the line-up.

In March 2023, the Wildtrak X model using the 2.0-litre Ecoblue bi-turbo (4WD) in a Double Cab configuration, was added to the line-up.

In January 2024, Ford discontinued four variants for the Ranger in Australia which includes: XL Double Cab Chassis (2WD) and Super Cab Pick-Up (4WD) bi-turbo variants, the XLS Double Cab Pick-Up (2WD) bi-turbo, and the Wildtrak X.

In July 2024, the off-road focused Tremor model using the 2.0-litre Ecoblue bi-turbo (4WD), went on sale and Ford Australia confirmed it will bring a batch of 1,150 units to local showrooms.

In March 2025, the PHEV plug-in hybrid model went on sale in Australia. The PHEV model is available for the XLT, Sport, Wildtrak and Stormtrak grades.

In November 2025, the Ranger (T6) line-up was updated with the 2.0-litre EcoBlue bi-turbo engine option was discontinued, the 3.0-litre V6 turbo-diesel engine was made available for the entry-level XL trim, the XLS trim became only available with the Double Cab/Chassis configuration, the Sport trim was discontinued, the Black Edition model became a permanent trim, and the special edition Wolftrak was temporarily made available.

In January 2026, the Ranger Super Duty was launched in Australia. Offered as: a single cab chassis, extended cab chassis, double cab chassis. In mid-2026 several more variants will release: a double cab pickup, XLT-trim double cab chassis and double cab pickup.

===== New Zealand =====
The second-generation Ranger (T6) was launched in New Zealand in July 2022. It is available in five grades: XL, XLT, Sport, Wildtrak and Raptor. For engines, it is available with a 2.0-litre Ecoblue single-turbo, 2.0-litre Ecoblue bi-turbo, 3.0-litre V6 turbo-diesel and a 3.0-litre V6 EcoBoost twin-turbo petrol (only for the Raptor model); along with two-wheel and four-wheel drive. In New Zealand, it is available in Single, Super or Double Cab bodies along with pick-up or cab-chassis configurations.

In June 2023, the Raptor model became available with the 2.0-litre Ecoblue bi-turbo diesel engine option.

In March 2025, the PHEV plug-in hybrid model went on sale in New Zealand. The PHEV model is available for the XLT, Wildtrak and Stormtrak grades.

==== South Africa ====
The second-generation Ranger (T6) was launched in South Africa on 5 December 2022, with four trim levels available at launch: Base, XL, XLT and Wildtrak. For engines, it is available with a 2.0-litre Ecoblue single-turbo, 2.0-litre Ecoblue bi-turbo, and a 3.0-litre V6 turbo-diesel; along with two-wheel and four-wheel drive. In South Africa, all variants come as a Double Cab body at the time of its launch.

In February 2023, the Raptor model using the 3.0-litre V6 EcoBoost twin-turbo petrol engine, was added to the line-up.

In March 2023, the Single Cab and Super Cab bodies were introduced in South Africa, for the XL, XLT and Wildtrak trims. The Single Cab body use the 2.0-litre Ecoblue single-turbo engine, while the Super Cab body use the 2.0-litre Ecoblue bi-turbo engine, along with two-wheel and four-wheel drive.

In October 2023, the Wildtrak X model using the 2.0-litre Ecoblue bi-turbo engine (4WD), was added to the line-up.

In February 2024, the off-road focused Tremor model using the 2.0-litre Ecoblue bi-turbo engine (4WD), was added to the line-up.

In March 2024, the flagship Platinum trim using the 2.0-litre Ecoblue bi-turbo engine (4WD), was added to the line-up.

In March 2026, the 2.0-litre Ecoblue single-turbo engine was upgraded and became paired with a 10-speed automatic, the 2.0-litre Ecoblue bi-turbo engine was discontinued, the 2.3-litre EcoBoost turbo petrol engine was introduced for the XLT, Wildtrak and Sport trims, and a new Sport trim was added to the line-up.

The Ranger Super Duty is planned to release in South Africa in 2027.

==== Asia ====
===== China =====
In China, the second-generation Ranger (T6) was introduced in 2023 making its debut for the first time in the country. The base trim consisted of the 260 horsepower 2.3 litre EcoBoost petrol engine alongside the optional 2.3 litre Duratorq diesel combined with rear-wheel-drive producing 186 horsepower. Both engines are paired to either a 6-speed manual transmission option available as standard alongside an optional 8 speed automatic. This layout was not available anywhere else outside of the country making it a China-exclusive model.

Ranger XLT 4WD China

Ranger XLT 4WD China Rear view

===== Indonesia =====
The second-generation Ranger (T6) imported from Thailand was launched in Indonesia by importer RMA Indonesia on 8 June 2023 alongside the Everest. It is available in four trims: Base, XLT, Wildtrak and Raptor. For engines, the Base trim uses the 2.0-litre Ecoblue turbo diesel engine and a 6-speed manual transmission, while other trims use the 2.0-litre Ecoblue twin turbo diesel engine and a 10-speed automatic transmission. All trims come standard with four-wheel drive and a Double Cab configuration.

In January 2025, the XL trim was introduced, replacing the Base trim. The XL trim was still equipped with the same 2.0-litre Ecoblue turbo diesel engine and 6-speed manual.

In July 2026, the Sport and Platinum trims were added to the lineup. The Platinum is the highest trim, equipped with a new 3.0-litre turbo-diesel V6 and a 10-speed automatic. The Sport trim is slotted between the XLT and Wildtrak trims, it is equipped with the 2.0-litre Ecoblue turbo diesel engine. Alongside these new trims, the 3.0-litre turbo-diesel V6 engine on the Wildtrak trim was also introduced.

===== Malaysia =====
The second-generation Ranger (T6) was launched in Malaysia on 22 July 2022, with four variants available at launch: XL, XLT, XLT Plus and Wildtrak. For engines, the XL and XLT variants use the 2.0-litre Ecoblue single-turbo engine, while the XLT Plus and Wildtrak variants use the 2.0-litre Ecoblue bi-turbo engine, and all variants comes standard with four-wheel drive. In Malaysia, all variants comes as a Double Cab body.

In October 2022, the Raptor model using the 3.0-litre V6 EcoBoost twin-turbo petrol, was added to the line-up. The Raptor model became available with 2.0-litre Ecoblue bi-turbo diesel engine option in June 2023.

In November 2023, the flagship Platinum variant using the 2.0-litre Ecoblue bi-turbo diesel engine option (4WD), was added to the line-up.

In May 2024, the StormTrak (4WD) variant, was released as a 200-unit limited edition variant.

In September 2024, the XLT Plus Special Edition (4WD) variant, features unique exterior accessories, was released as a 300-unit limited edition variant.

In August 2025, the Wildtrak model was made available with the 3.0-litre V6 turbo-diesel engine option.

In July 2026, four new variants were added to the Ranger line-up: XL 2.0, Sport 2.0, Sport 3.0 and Platinum 3.0.

===== Philippines =====
The second-generation Ranger (T6) was launched in the Philippines on 28 July 2022 alongside the Everest. At launch, it is available with five grades: XL, XLS, XLT, Sport and Wildtrak. For engines, all variants use the 2.0-litre Ecoblue single-turbo engine except for the Wildtrak (4x4) which uses the bi-turbo version of the same engine. Four-wheel drive is standard on the XL grade, except for the upper grades which comes as standard with two-wheel drive. In the Philippines, all variants comes as a Double Cab body.

In May 2023, the Raptor model using the 2.0-litre Ecoblue bi-turbo diesel engine, was added to the line-up. The Raptor model became available with the 3.0-litre V6 EcoBoost twin-turbo petrol engine option in October 2024.

In May 2025, the Sport Special Edition variant, available in two-wheel and four-wheel drive, was added to the line-up. In addition, the XL+ 4x4 variant was added to the line-up in the same month.

In November 2025, the Special Edition variants of the Wildtrak and Raptor were made available, with a limited quantity of 100 units for each model.

In July 2026, the limited edition Sport+ 4x4 model equipped with powered side steps was made available.

The Ranger line-up was updated in September 2026, with the addition of the Wildtrak X model and the introduction of the 3.0-litre V6 turbo-diesel engine, the Wildtrak model switched to using the 3.0-litre V6 turbo-diesel engine, the discontinuation of the 2.0-litre Ecoblue single- and bi-turbo engines, the discontinuation of the XLT, XLS, Sport and the diesel Raptor models, and all variants became paired with a 10-speed automatic and 4x4 as standard. It is available with three variants: Wildtrak, Wildtrak X and Raptor.

===== Taiwan =====
The second-generation Ranger (T6) was launched in Taiwan on 13 June 2023, with three trim levels: XLT, Wildtrak and Raptor. For engines, the XLT use the 2.0-litre Ecoblue single-turbo engine, the Wildtrak use the 2.0-litre Ecoblue bi-turbo engine, and the Raptor use the 3.0-litre V6 EcoBoost twin-turbo petrol engine; four-wheel drive is standard on all variants. In Taiwan, all variants comes as a Double Cab body. In September 2023, the Ranger First Edition Special Edition was made available limited to 800 units. In December 2024, the entry-level XLT trim was discontinued and the limited edition Wildtrak variant was made available. In May 2025, the Wildtrak trim became equipped with the FRS adjustable loading system which features a folding roof rack and a sliding roll bar.

===== Thailand =====
The second-generation Ranger (T6) was launched in Thailand on 21 March 2022 alongside the Everest. At launch, it is available in three trim levels: Sport, Wildtrak and Raptor. For engines, both the Sport and Wildtrak trims have the option of either 2.0-litre Ecoblue single-turbo or bi-turbo engines, while the Raptor model use the 3.0-litre V6 EcoBoost twin-turbo petrol engine; along with two-wheel and four-wheel drive. In Thailand, all variants comes as a Double Cab body at the time of its launch. During the 43rd Bangkok International Motor Show, the Ranger and the Ranger Raptor models received a combined total of 2,589 bookings.

In May 2022, Standard Cab, Flat Bed and OpenCab bodies were introduced in Thailand. The Standard Cab and OpenCab bodies comes in XL and XLT trims, using the 2.0-litre Ecoblue single-turbo engine, and is available with either two-wheel or four-wheel drive. The Flat Bed body have the option of either 2.0-litre Ecoblue single-turbo or bi-turbo engines, and is available with either two-wheel or four-wheel drive.

In March 2023, the Raptor model became available with the 2.0-litre Ecoblue bi-turbo diesel engine option. The Stromtrak model using the 2.0-litre Ecoblue bi-turbo engine, is available with either two-wheel or four-wheel drive, was added to the line-up. The XLS trim, using the 2.0-litre Ecoblue single-turbo engine (2WD), available in either OpenCab and Double Cab bodies, was added to the line-up.

In March 2024, the Wildtrak model using the 3.0-litre V6 turbo-diesel engine (4WD), was added to the line-up.

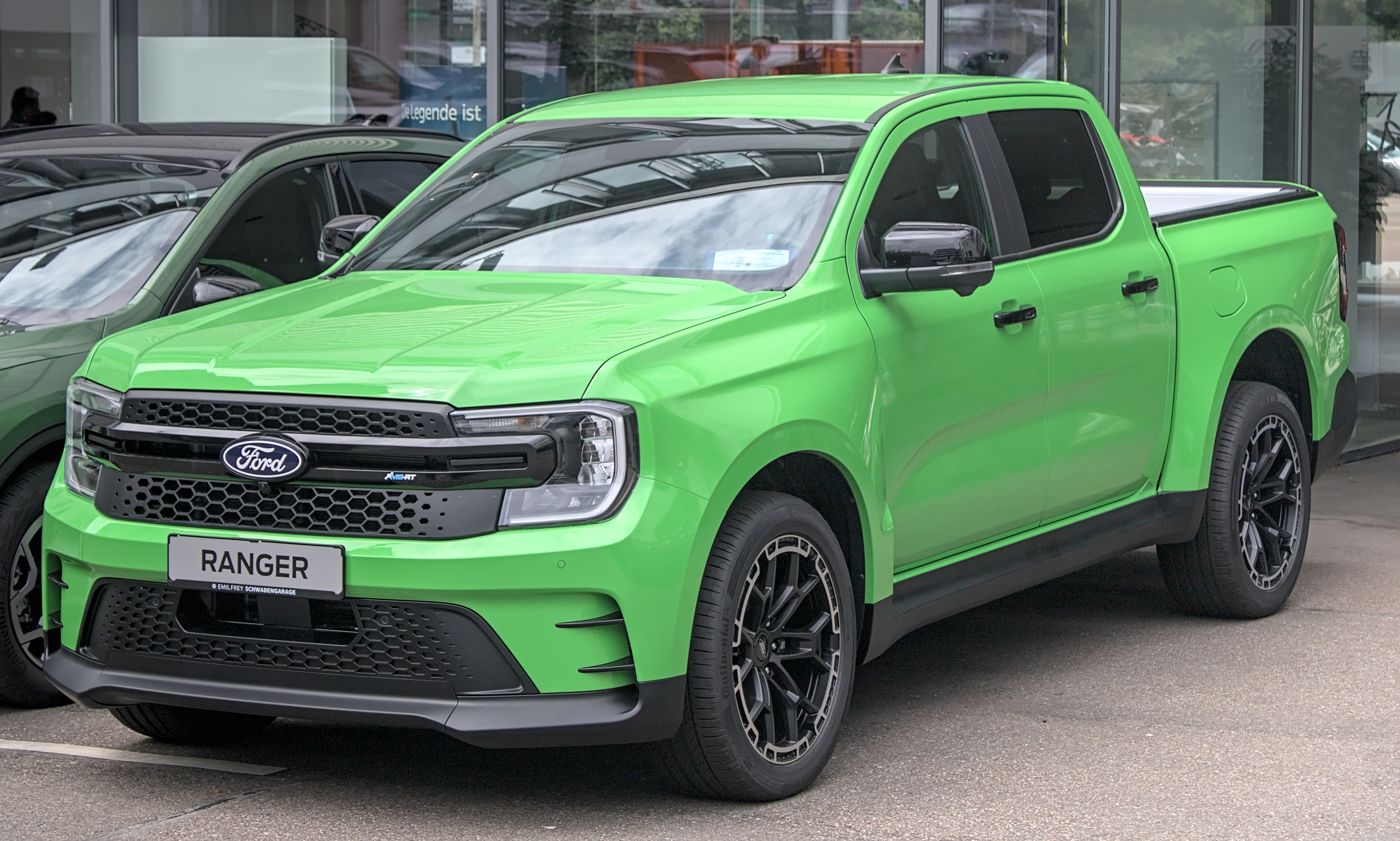
Ranger MS-RT

In November 2024, the racing-style MS-RT model was added to the line-up. The MS-RT model was developed in collaboration with Ford, MS-RT tuning and M-Sport, Ford’s motorsport partners in Europe, and is designed to be the ‘Ultimate Street Truck’. The MS-RT model uses the 3.0-litre V6 turbo-diesel engine (4WD), 21-inch diamond-cut aluminium alloy wheels, motorsport-inspired body design and a lowered suspension.

In September 2025, the XLS, Wildtrak (non-V6) and Raptor V6 models became available with the Extra Pack option. The Extra Pack consists of decorative exterior stickers, new alloy wheel designs and a black sports bar.

In March 2026, the Super Duty model was introduced in Thailand, with the 3.0-litre V6 turbo-diesel engine (4WD) and Double Cab body. During the same month, the Wildtrak X model using the 3.0-litre V6 turbo-diesel engine (4WD), was also added to the line-up. In October 2026, the Single Cab Chassis for the Super Duty model was introduced.

In August 2026, the Wolftrak model was introduced in Thailand, with the 2.0-litre EcoBlue single-turbo engine available with two-wheel and four-wheel drive, was also added to the line-up.

===== Vietnam =====
The second-generation Ranger (T6) was launched in Vietnam on 26 August 2022, with four variants: XL, XLS, XLT and Wildtrak. For engines, all variants except for the Wildtrak use the 2.0-litre Ecoblue single-turbo engine, while the Wildtrak use the 2.0-litre Ecoblue bi-turbo engine. All variants except for the XLS variant comes standard with four-wheel drive, while the XLS variant comes standard with two-wheel drive. In Vietnam, all variants comes as a Double Cab body.

In March 2023, the Raptor model using the 2.0-litre Ecoblue bi-turbo diesel engine, was added to the line-up.

In May 2023, the XLT (4WD) variant was replaced by the Sport variant, which use the 2.0-litre Ecoblue single-turbo engine (4WD).

In March 2024, the Stormtrak variant using the 2.0-litre Ecoblue single-turbo engine (4WD), was added to the line-up.

In July 2024, the Black Edition (2WD) variant based on the entry-level XL variant features unique black exterior and interior accents, was released as a 1,500-unit limited production variant.

In April 2025, the XLS Plus variant was quietly added to the line-up.

In May 2026, the Wildtrak X model using the 3.0-litre V6 turbo-diesel engine (4WD) was added to the line-up.

The Ranger line-up was updated in July 2026, with equipment changes, the 2.0-litre Ecoblue single-turbo engine was upgraded with a new timing chain and a Bosch fuel injection system, the discontinuation of the 2.0-litre Ecoblue bi-turbo engine, the Raptor model switched to using the 3.0-litre V6 EcoBoost twin-turbo petrol engine, and all variants became paired with a 10-speed automatic. It is available with five variants: XLS (4x2), XLS (4x4), Wildtrak (4x4), Wildtrak V6 (4x4) and Raptor V6 (4x4).

=== Safety ===
ANCAP test results Ford Ranger all variants excluding Raptor & PHEV (2022, aligned with Euro NCAP)
Test	Points	%
Overall:	5 /5 stars	
Adult occupant:	32.24	84%
Child occupant:	46	93%
Pedestrian:	39.96	74%
Safety assist:	13.39	83%

Euro NCAP test results Ford Ranger (2022)
Test	Points	%
Overall:	5 /5 stars	
Adult occupant:	32	84%
Child occupant:	44.2	90%
Pedestrian:	40	74%
Safety assist:	13.6	84%

Latin NCAP 3.0 test results Ford Ranger + 7 Airbags (2022, similar to Euro NCAP 2014)
Test	Points	%
Overall:	5 /5 stars	
Adult occupant:	37.24	93%
Child occupant:	44.00	90%
Pedestrian:	35.89	75%
Safety assist:	39.57	92%

== Derivatives ==
=== Ford Everest ===
The T6 Ranger is used as the basis for the Ford Everest since its second generation. Unveiled in November 2014, the Everest visibly shared body panels with the T6 Ranger including the front bonnet, front doors and front fenders. The Everest is developed and adapted by Ford Australia.

=== Ford Bronco ===
The sixth-generation Ford Bronco shares its chassis (in modified form) and 2.3-litre EcoBoost engine with the North American version of the Ranger T6. A mid-size SUV, the Bronco is offered as a two-door and four-door convertible.

=== Mazda BT-50 ===
Developed in tandem with the first-generation T6-based Ranger, the second-generation Mazda BT-50 is mechanically identical to the Ranger, using the 2.2-litre and 3.2-litre Duratorq diesel engines (as the rebranded MZ-CD engines). In the reverse of its predecessors, the second-generation BT-50 was developed by Ford. As the BT-50 was styled using the work of a separate design team, the two vehicles share almost no common body panels, with the exception of the roof stamping and the window glass.

In 2020, Mazda released a third-generation BT-50 derived from the Isuzu D-Max, marking the first time in 50 years that neither Ford nor Mazda have shared a compact pickup body.

=== Troller T4 ===
The Troller T4 is an off-road vehicle that was produced in Brazil by Ford subsidiary Troller Veículos Especiais S/A. Designed with a similar body and chassis layout as the Jeep Wrangler and Land Rover, the T4 was produced from 2004 to 2021. Following the purchase of Troller by Ford, the T4 underwent a design upgrade in 2014, adopting a shorter-wheelbase version of the Ranger T6 frame.

In 2021, Ford Brasil ended local vehicle production, ultimately closing down operations of its Troller subsidiary.

== Sales ==
The Ranger is consistently among the best-selling vehicles in nations around the world, including in Australia, New Zealand, South Africa, Vietnam, the Philippines, and Argentina. In 2024, the Ranger became the best-selling pickup truck in Europe for ten years in a row, accounting for nearly half of all pickup trucks sold in Europe and claiming a majority of the market in Ireland, Germany, Belgium, and the United Kingdom.

Year	Australia	New Zealand	Malaysia	Thailand	Philippines	Vietnam	Europe	United States	Mexico	Brazil	Argentina	South Africa
2012	18,097		2,194						4,607	15,225		
2013	21,752		5,771				15,500		4,865	22,077		
2014	20,674		8,578	23,977			21,600		6,913	24,136		
2015	29,185	6,818	9,223	23,898			27,300		10,382	16,833		33,916
2016	36,934	8,478	6,832	30,869			38,600		9,925	15,813		32,468
2017	42,728	9,420	5,623	44,533			44,600		7,317	17,717		32,786
2018	42,114	9,904	6,662	55,526			50,900		5,900	20,557		30,135
2019	40,960	9,485	5,597	43,486	14,759	11,177	48,954	89,571	9,148	22,221	11,638	25,042
2020	40,973	7,975	5,287	24,508	9,767	13,291	43,046	101,486	6,560	19,836	11,341	18,846
2021	50,279	12,580	4,680	26,917	9,184	15,650	54,466	94,755	7,710	20,501	14,925	19,077
2022	47,479	11,577	5,802	33,815	11,396	15,537		57,005	6,465	14,285	13,189	17,341
2023	63,356	9,907	8,694	24,424	13,234	16,085		32,334	4,716	20,356	24,241	24,618
2024	62,593	11,748	6,011	12,739	13,812	17,508	60,400	46,205	6,465	31,855	22,690	25,533
2025	56,555							70,960		34,063		
