= Ford Ranger (international) =

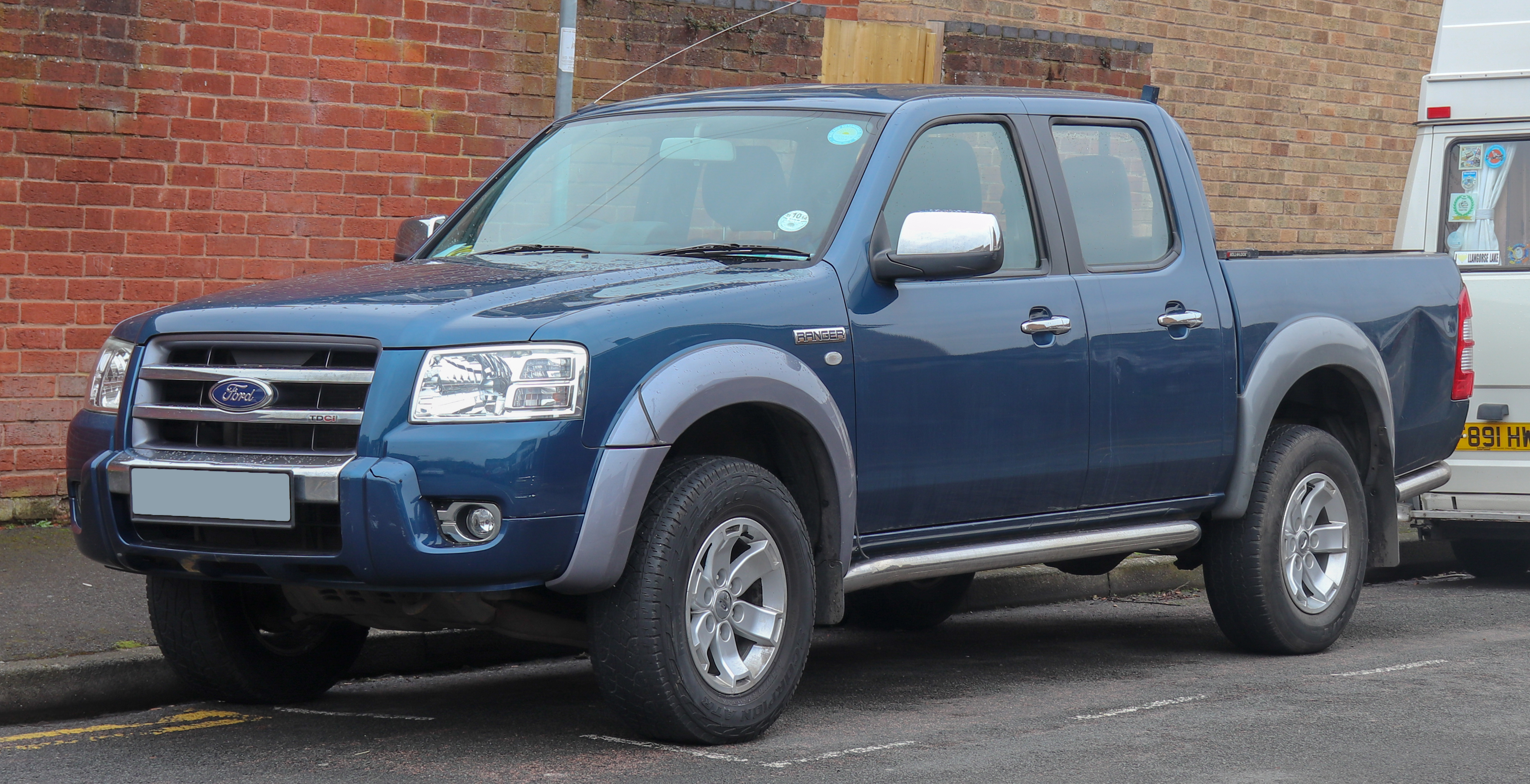
- 2007 Ford Ranger (PJ)

Overview
- Manufacturer: Ford
- Also called: Ford Courier (1998–2006)
- Production: 1998–present

Body and chassis
- Class: Compact pickup truck (1998–2011); Mid-size pickup truck (2011–present)
- Body style: 2-door single cab 2-door extended cab 4-door double cab
- Layout: Front-engine, rear-wheel-drive or four-wheel-drive
- Related: Ford Everest; Mazda B-Series; Mazda BT-50

Chronology
- Predecessor: Ford Courier (PC/PD)

The international or global version of the Ford Ranger is a series of pickup trucks sold by Ford under the Ranger nameplate mainly for markets outside the Americas since 1998. The 1998–2011 international Ranger models were jointly developed with Mazda, sharing the same assembly line and most parts with the Mazda B-Series and its successor, the Mazda BT-50. It is a successor of the Ford Courier as the Mazda-based Ford global pickup. The vehicles are mainly produced in Rayong, Thailand and Pretoria, South Africa.

The first-generation Ranger was produced from 1998 to 2006, with a facelift in 2002. The 2006–2011 second-generation Ranger was introduced after the B-Series was replaced by the Mazda BT-50. The globally-marketed T6 Ranger has been produced since 2011. In contrast to the previous versions, the T6 platform-based Ranger was designed by Ford Australia, and is also marketed in North America since 2019.

== First generation (PE/PG/PH; 1998) ==
First generation
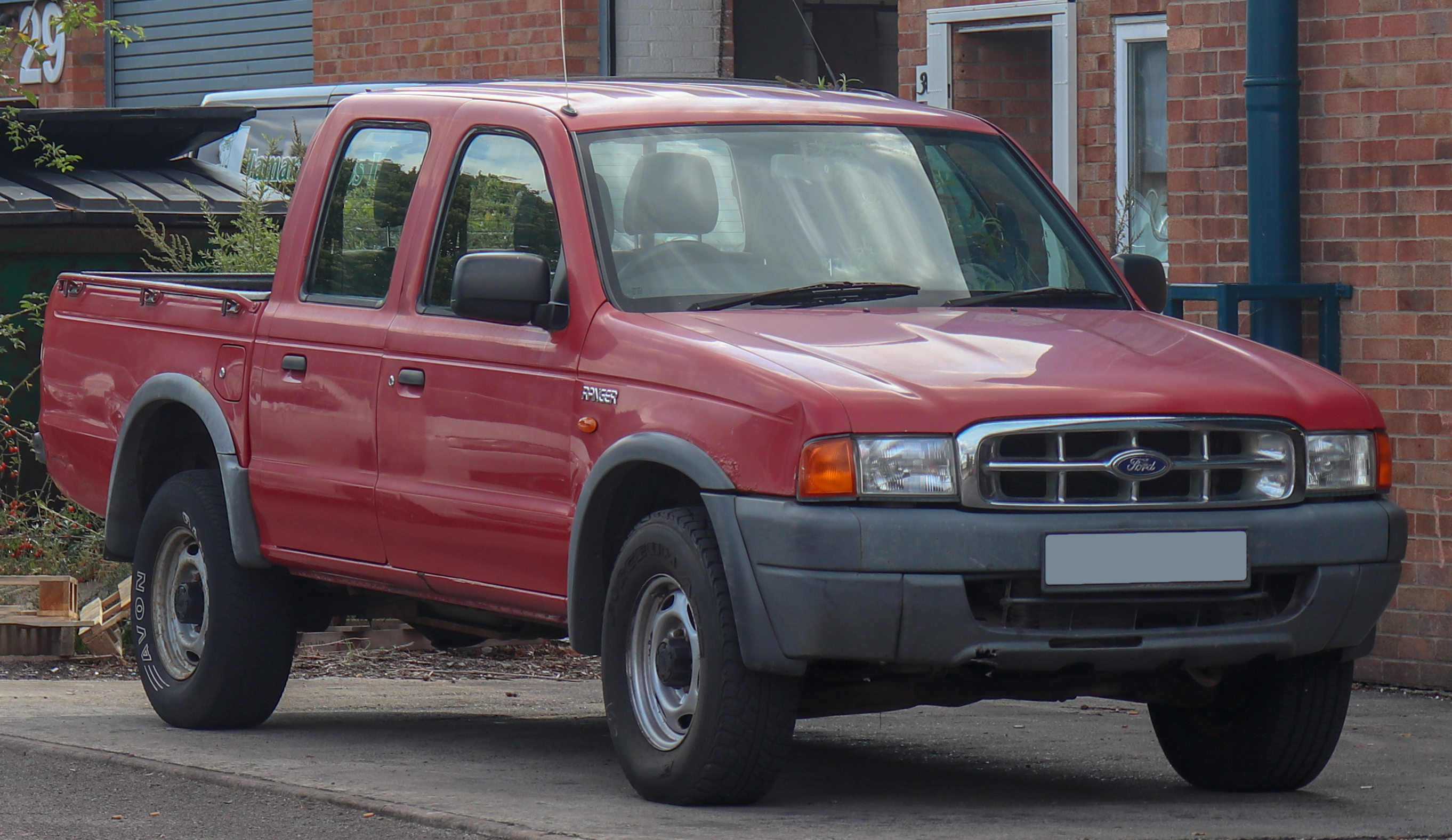

Overview
- Model code: PE (1998–2002); PG (2002–2004); PH (2004–2006)
- Also called: Ford Courier
- Production: 1998–2006
- Assembly: Thailand: Rayong (AAT); Philippines: Santa Rosa, Laguna; South Africa: Silverton, Pretoria (Ford South Africa); Colombia: Bogotá (CCA); Vietnam: Hải Dương (Ford Vietnam); Malaysia: Shah Alam, Selangor (AMIM)

Body and chassis
- Related: Mazda B-Series (UN); Ford Everest (U268)

Powertrain
- Engine: Petrol: 2.6 L G6E I4; 4.0 L Cologne V6; Diesel: 2.5 L WL Duratorq I4; 2.5 L WLT Duratorq I4 turbo; 2.9 L W9 Duratorq I4; 3.0 L VS Duratorq I4 turbo
- Transmission: 5-speed manual 4-speed automatic 5-speed automatic

Dimensions
- Wheelbase: 2,985–3,000 mm (117.5–118.1 in)
- Length: 4,793–5,160 mm (188.7–203.1 in)
- Width: 1,695–1,810 mm (66.7–71.3 in)
- Height: 1,615–1,788 mm (63.6–70.4 in)
- Curb weight: 1,240–1,815 kg (2,734–4,001 lb)

The 1998–2006 Ranger/Courier (codenamed PE, PG and PH in Australia) is a rebadged fifth-generation (UN) Mazda B-Series with a reworked front fascia as a differentiation. Production at the AutoAlliance Thailand plant began in May 1998, being one of the first vehicles to roll off the production line at the newly built joint venture manufacturing plant. This model was sold as the Ford Courier in Australia and New Zealand.

Engine options included a petrol engine which is a 2.6-litre unit that produces 92 kW (125 PS; 123 hp) at 4,600 rpm and 206 N⋅m (21.0 kg⋅m; 152 lb⋅ft) of torque at 3,500 rpm, while the diesel engines were either 2.5-litre that produces 60 kW (82 PS; 80 hp) and a 2.5-litre turbo-diesel that offers 84 kW (114 PS; 113 hp) at 3,500 rpm and 280 N⋅m (29 kg⋅m; 210 lb⋅ft) at 2,000 rpm. The turbo-diesel engine features a single overhead camshaft design, three valves per cylinder, intercooler, indirect fuel injection and two internal balance shafts to reduce vibration and noise. Ford and Mazda has decided not to use a conventional radial type turbocharger on its new engine. Instead, a new diagonal exhaust gas flow turbocharger is used which was claimed to improve charging efficiency, reduce turbo lag and improve throttle response at low speeds.

The vehicle had received two stars of Australian New Car Assessment Program (ANCAP) safety rating in 2006. Dual front airbags were optional and were not fitted to the test vehicle.

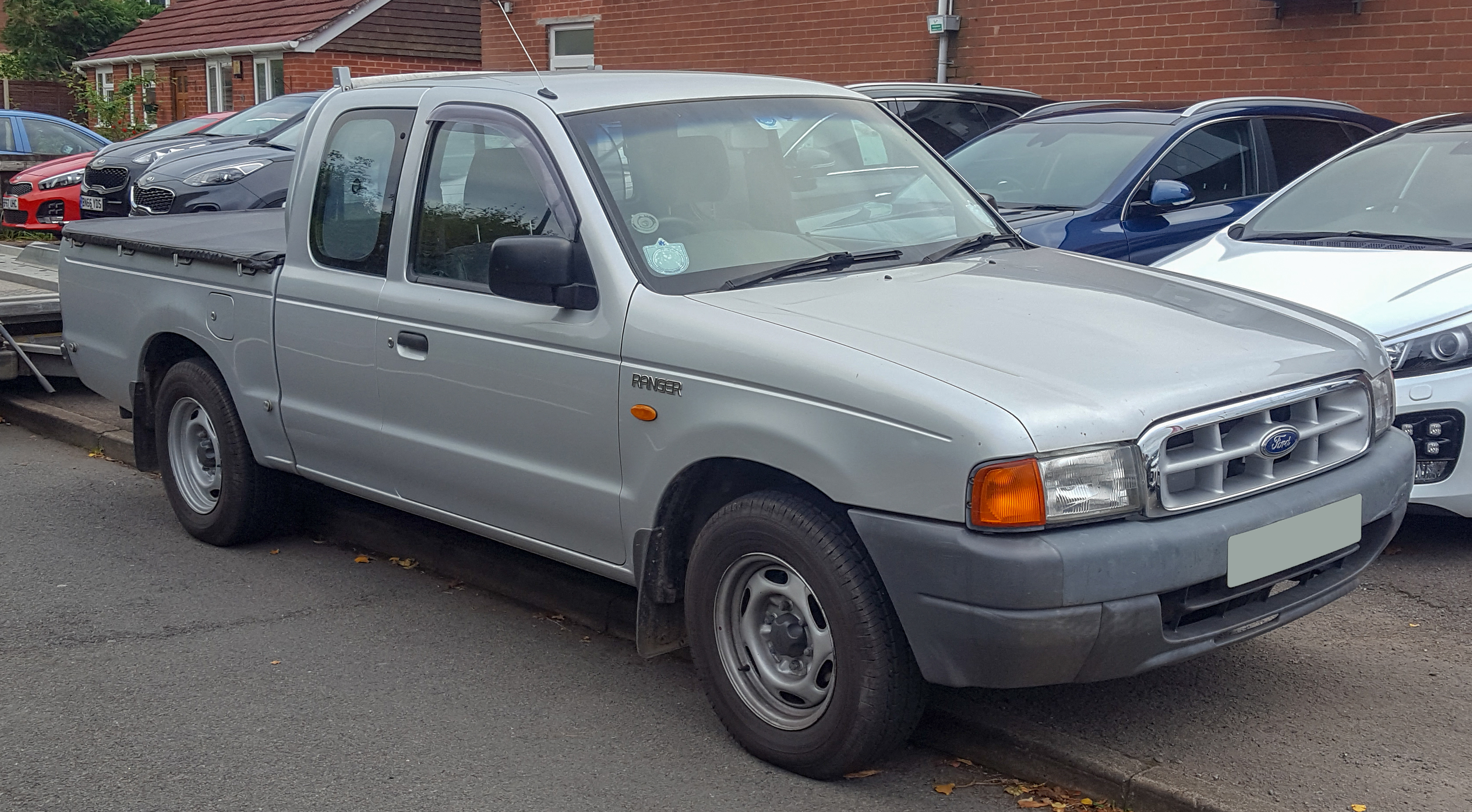
Ford Ranger Super Cab (pre-facelift)

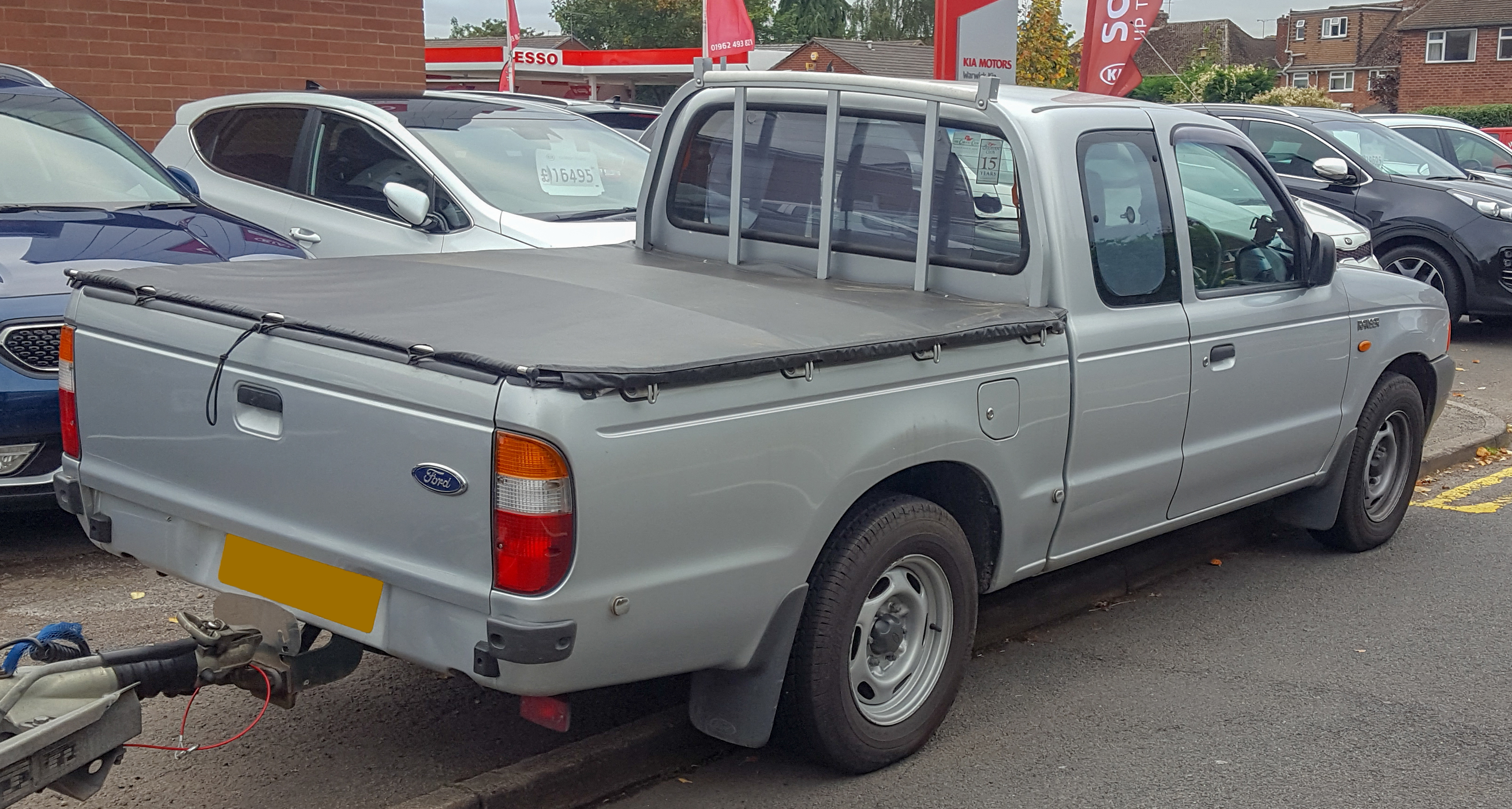
Ford Ranger Super Cab (pre-facelift)

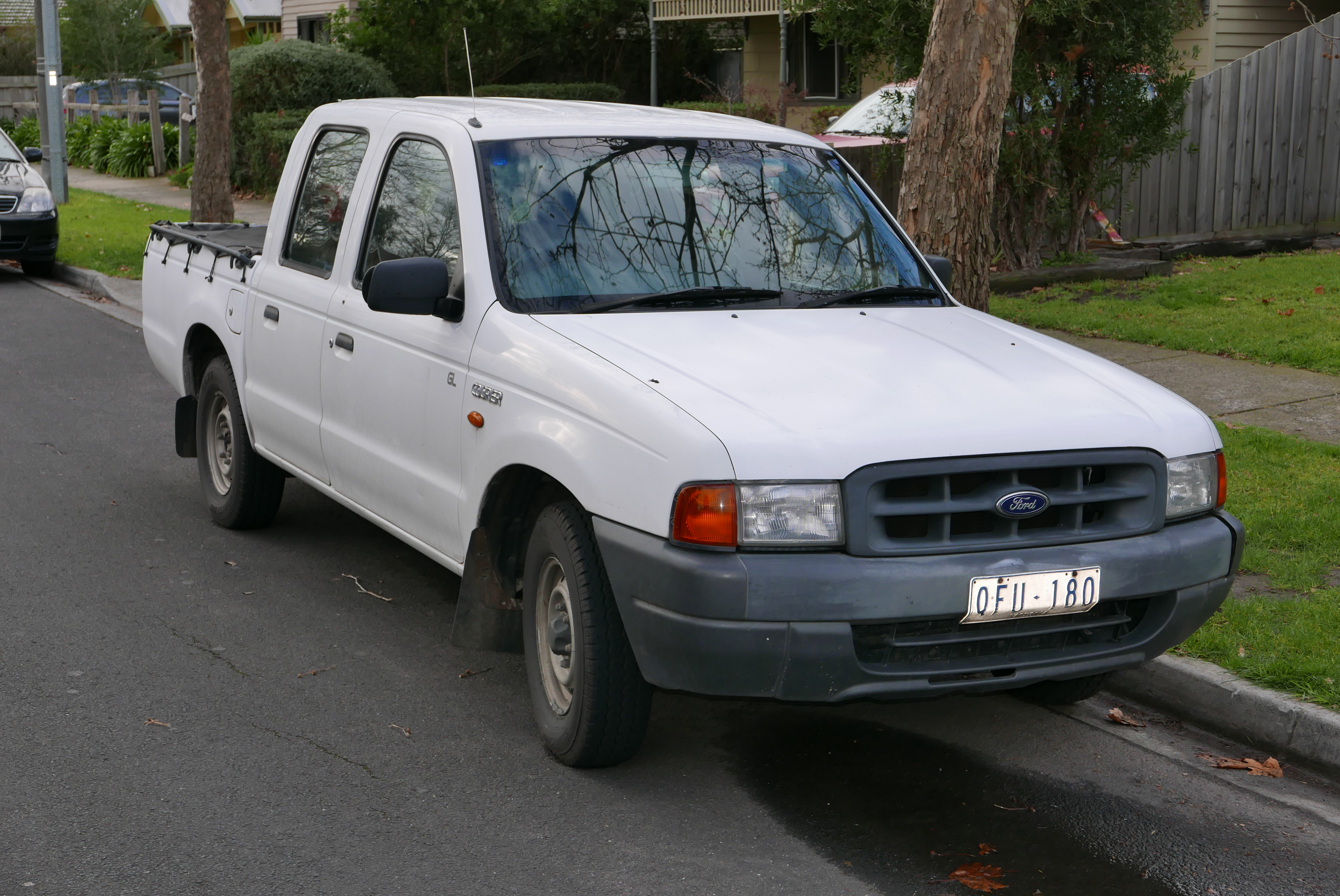
Ford Courier double cabin (pre-facelift)

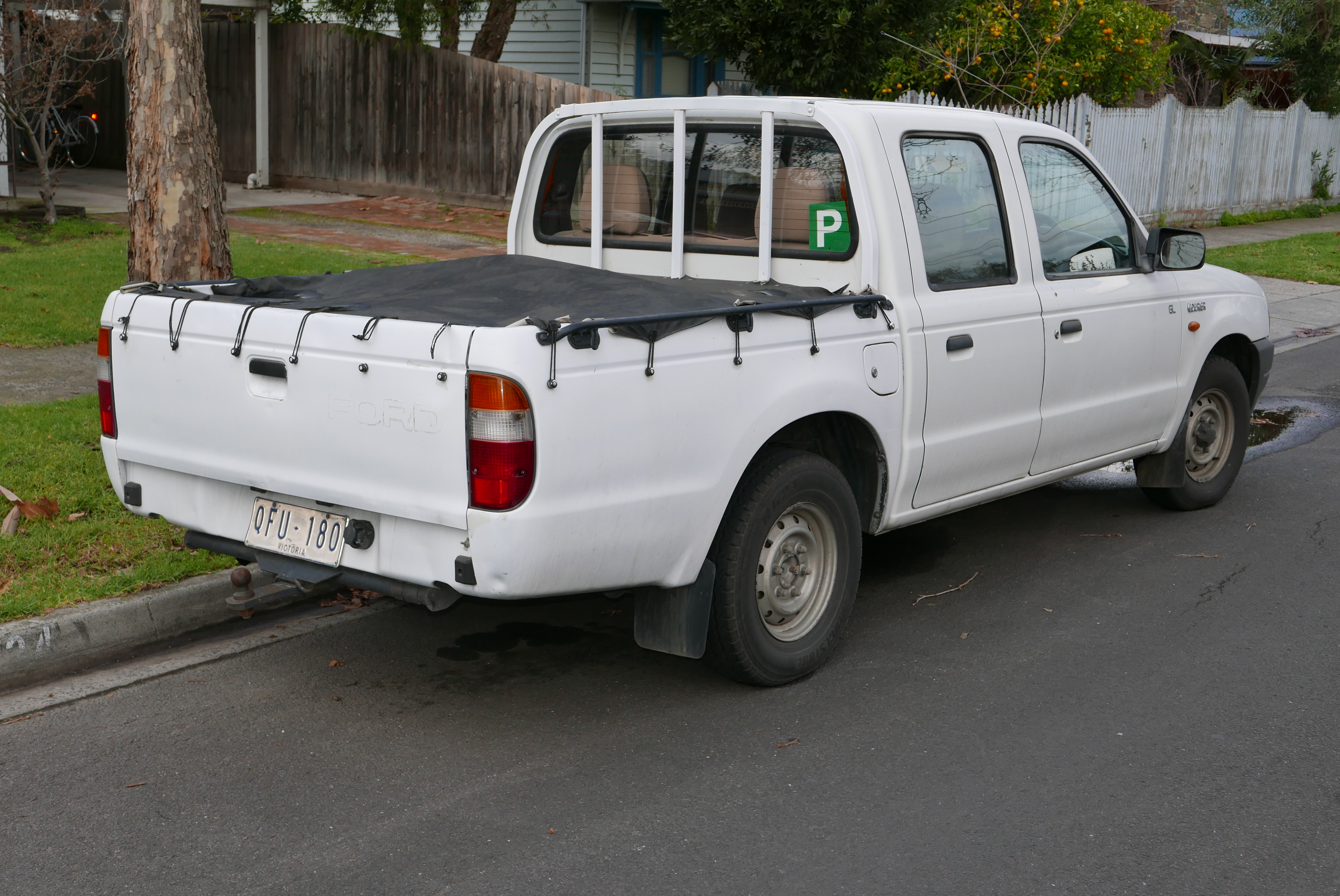
Ford Courier double cabin (pre-facelift)

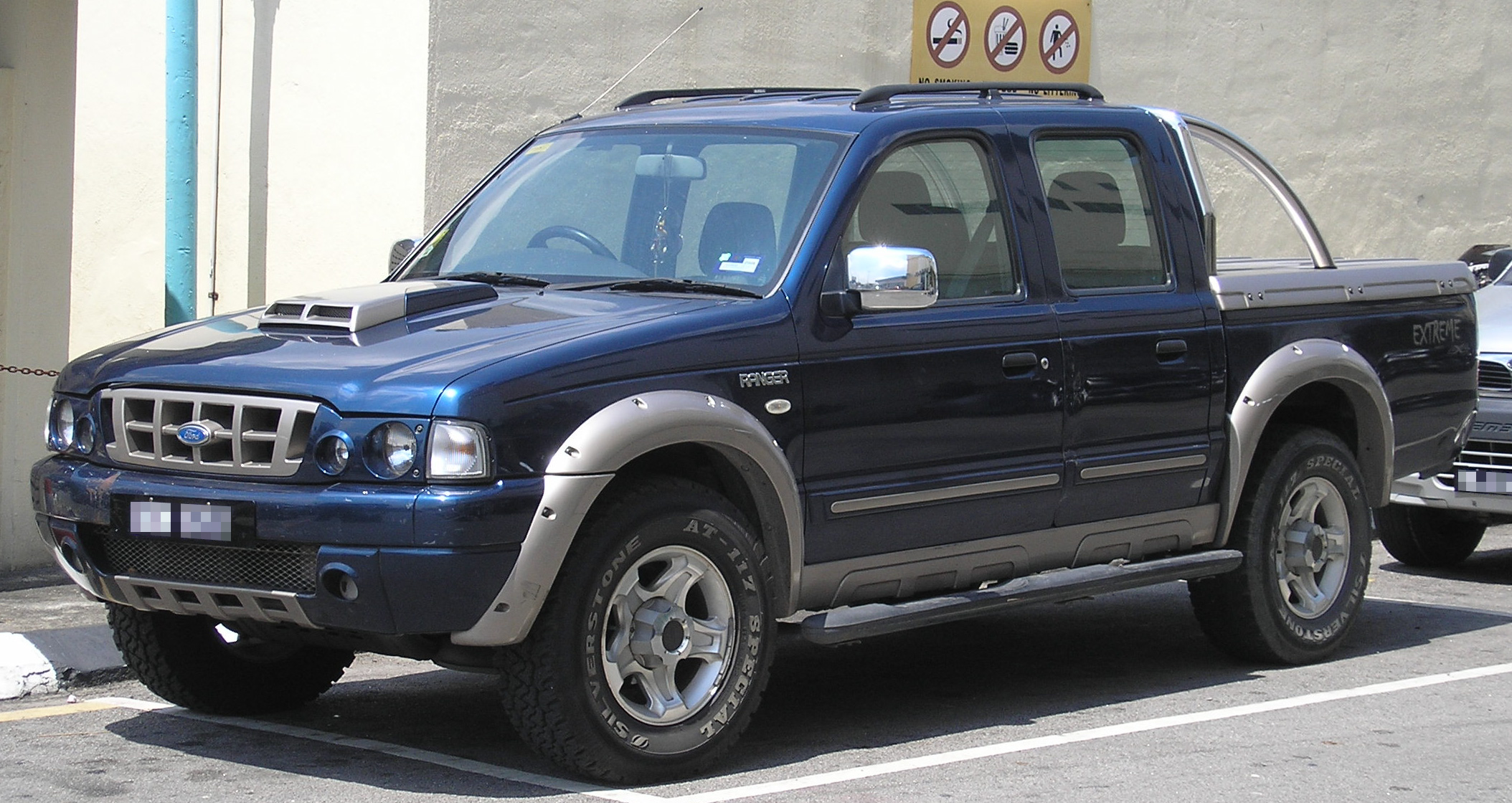
Ford Ranger Extreme double cabin (pre-facelift)

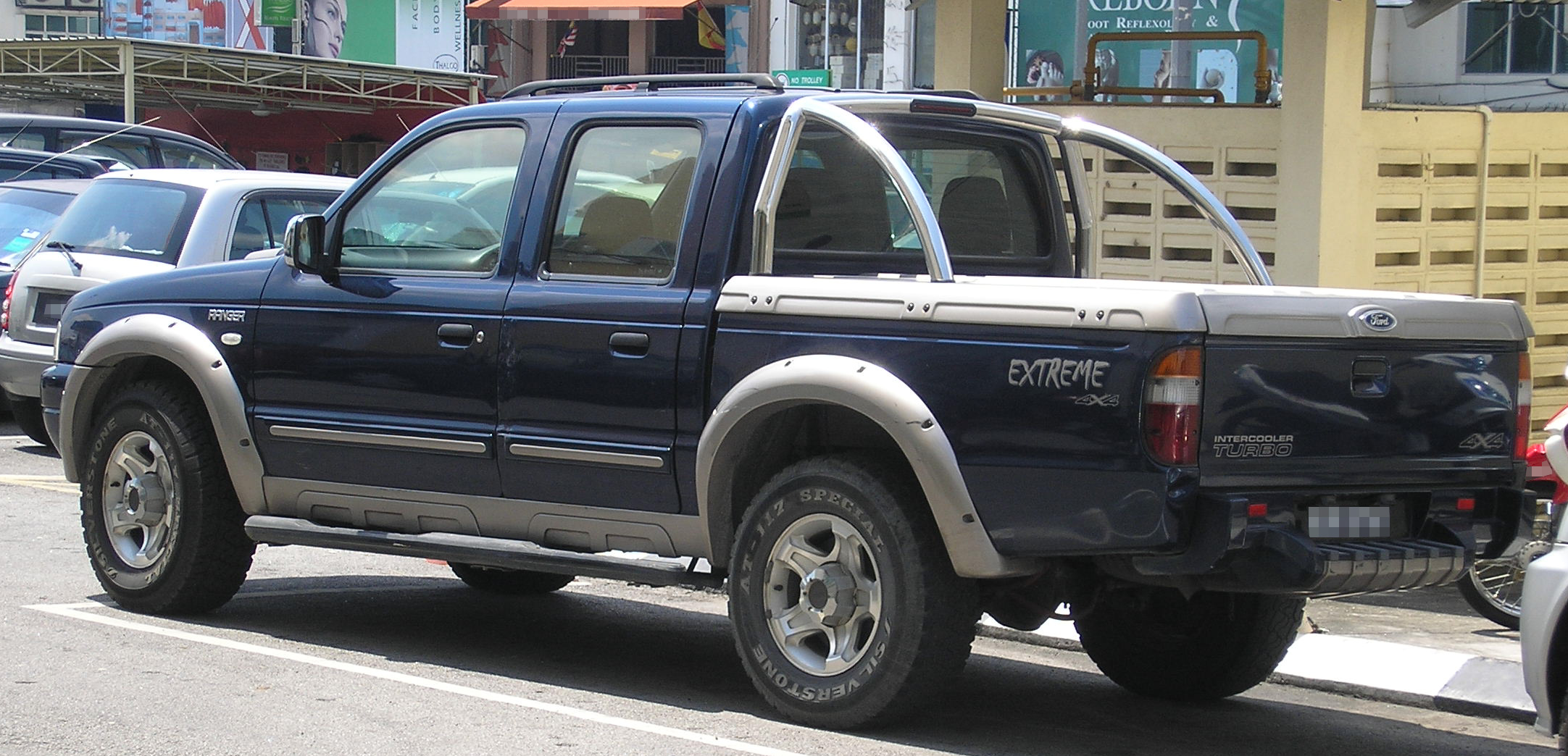
Ford Ranger Extreme double cabin (pre-facelift)

=== Facelift ===
The late 2002 facelift models feature a new grille, headlights, front bumper and front fenders and improved interiors. It has been restyled to mimic the design of the North American F-Series trucks. Power steering is now standard across the range and swaps its variable ratio for a new fixed gear ratio. In 2005, Ford released the 2.5-litre common rail injection turbo-diesel engine. The engine features a dual-mass flywheel which sharpens responses while also reducing vibration and a variable geometry turbocharger is employed to cut turbo lag and extend the torque band. The common-rail architecture of the Ranger's engine has improved its noise, vibration and harshness (NVH) levels.

In the same year, Ford also introduced a V6 engine option for the Courier. The V6 model was made in Thailand before it was sent to South Africa where it was mated with the short-stroke 4.0-litre SOHC Cologne V6 engine, previously re-engineered for the Ford Explorer, which produces 154 kW (209 PS; 207 hp) of power and 323 N⋅m (32.9 kg⋅m; 238 lb⋅ft) of torque. The fuel tank is also increased to 80 litres, up 10 litres from the models fitted with the smaller engines. Ford engineers also retuned the front shock absorbers for improved ride quality and body control over rough roads for the V6 model compared to the inline-four models.

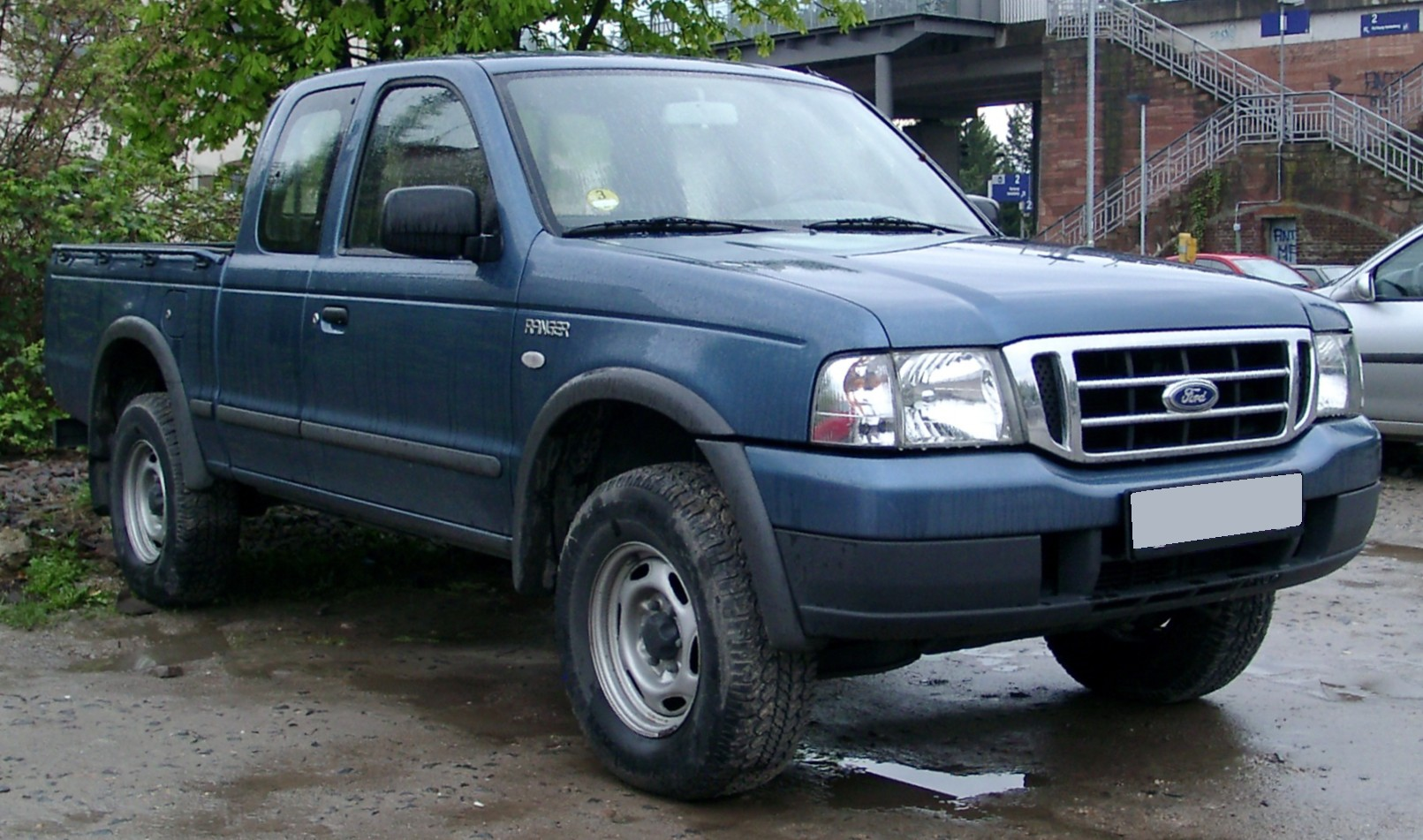
Ford Ranger Super Cab (facelift)

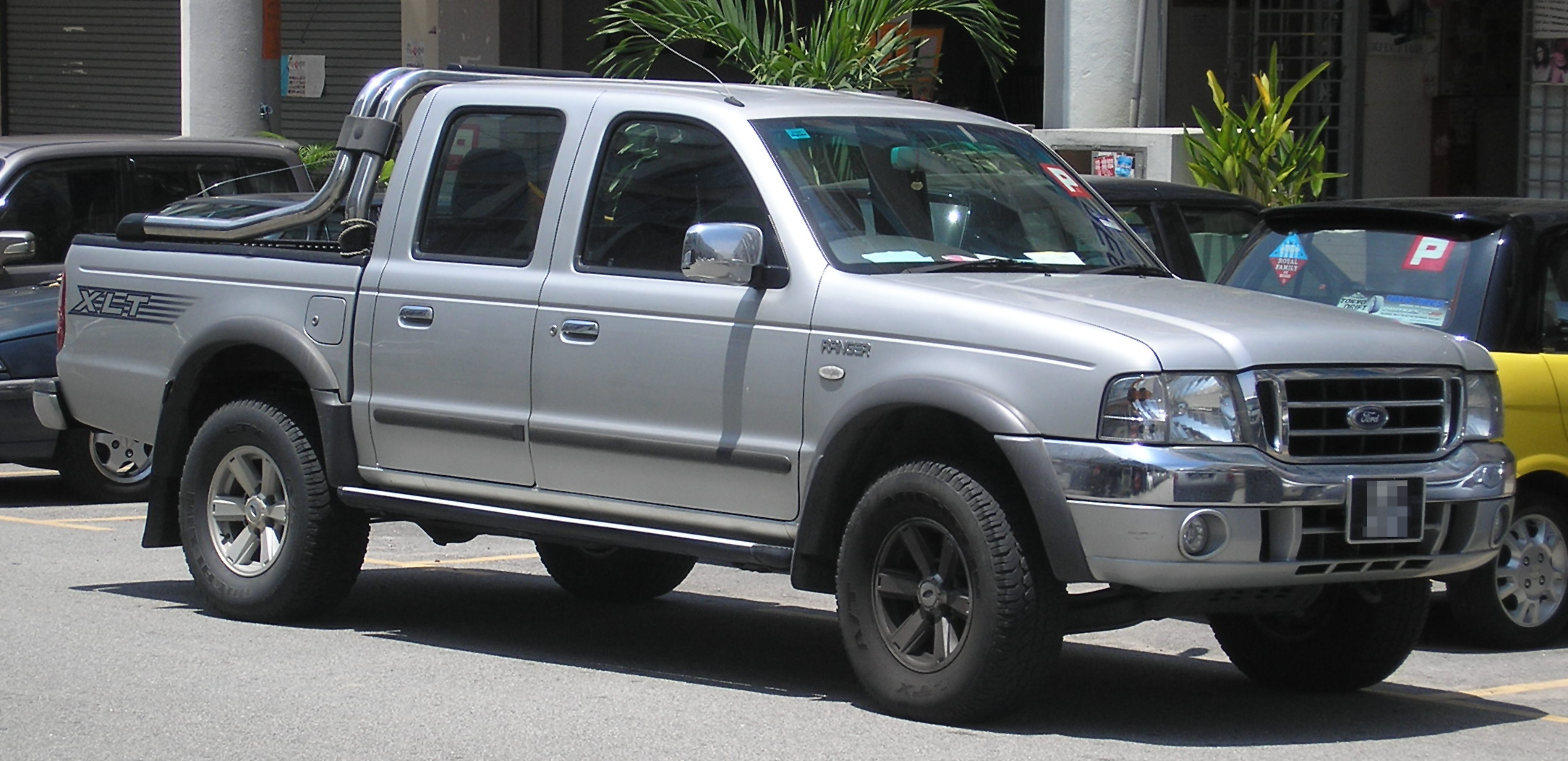
Ford Ranger dual cab (facelift)

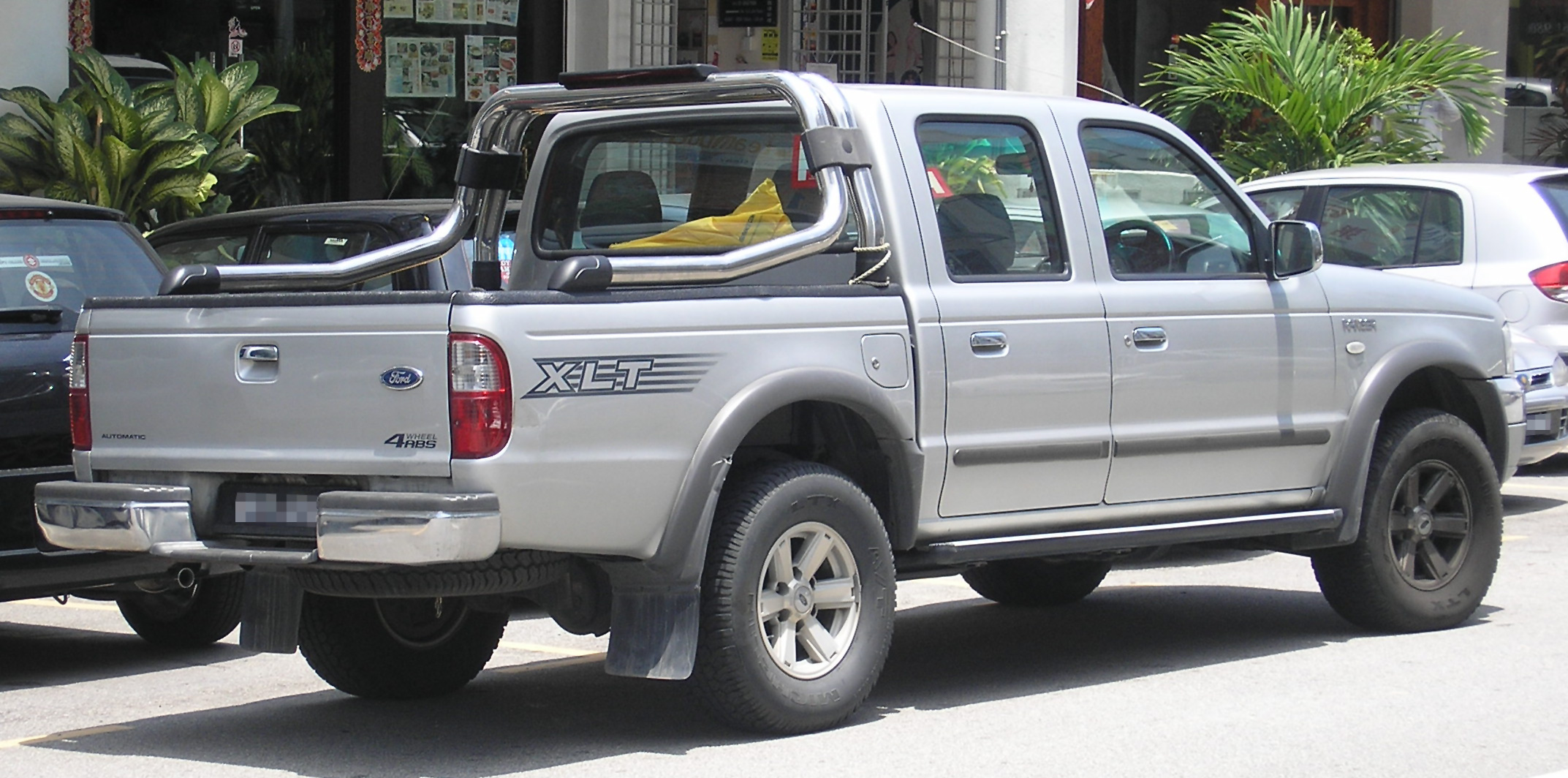
Ford Ranger dual cab (facelift)

=== Safety ===
ANCAP test results* Ford Courier GL 4x4 crew cab (2005)
Test	Score
Overall	2 /5 stars
Frontal offset	2.62/16
Side impact	16/16
Pole	Not Assessed
Seat belt reminders	0/3
Whiplash protection	Not Assessed
Pedestrian protection	Poor
Electronic stability control	Not Assessed

== Second generation (PJ/PK; 2006) ==
Second generation
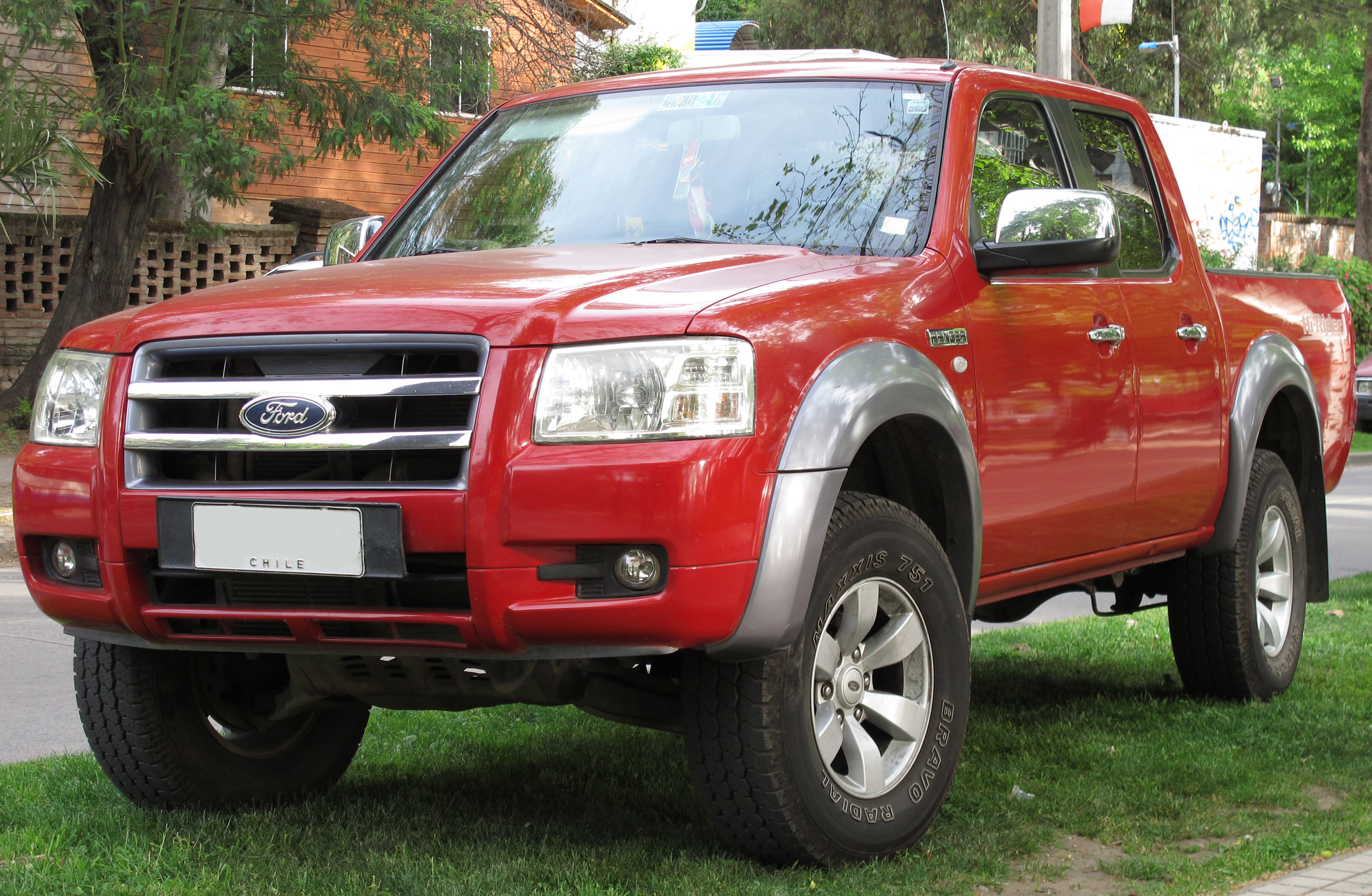

Overview
- Model code: PJ; PK
- Production: 2006–2011
- Assembly: Thailand: Rayong (AAT); South Africa: Silverton, Pretoria (Ford South Africa); Taiwan: Taoyuan (Ford Lio Ho); Colombia: Bogotá (CCA); Vietnam: Hải Dương (Ford Vietnam)

Body and chassis
- Related: Mazda BT-50 (UN); Ford Everest (U268)

Powertrain
- Engine: Diesel: 2.5 L WLAA Duratorq I4; 2.5 L WLC Duratorq I4 turbo; 3.0 L WEC Duratorq I4 turbo
- Transmission: 5-speed manual 5-speed automatic

Dimensions
- Wheelbase: 2,985–3,000 mm (117.5–118.1 in)
- Length: 4,841–5,389 mm (190.6–212.2 in)
- Width: 1,715–1,850 mm (67.5–72.8 in)
- Height: 1,622–1,848 mm (63.9–72.8 in)
- Curb weight: 1,468–2,200 kg (3,236–4,850 lb)

The 2006–2011 Ranger (codenamed PJ and PK in Australia) is an updated version of the previous generation. The design of the PJ Ranger was previewed by the Ford 4-Trac Concept which debuted at the Bangkok Auto Show in December 2005. The concept vehicle design development was led by Ford Asia-Pacific chief designer, Paul Gibson. The production version was designed and built in Thailand in tandem with the Mazda BT-50.

While the previous generation Ranger is a rebadge of the Mazda B-Series with a different fascia, the Ranger now has its distinct styling designed by former Ford Australia design chief, Simon Butterworth. As the result, the PJ Ranger picks up the new corporate design that appeared on several Ford North American light trucks. Although the changes are drastic compared to the PE/PG/PH Ranger hence Ford's "all-new" claim, it is instead a comprehensive redevelopment of the old model.

In Australia and New Zealand, the Courier nameplate was dropped in favour of Ranger to distance itself from a 'basic workhorse' image and to align the model name with its Asian and European counterparts.

Ford did not offer a petrol engine option in the PJ/PK Ranger, instead offering a choice of two four-cylinder common-rail turbo-diesel engines, one a 2.5-litre, the other a 3.0-litre. The 2.5-litre Duratorq engine is a DOHC 16-valve turbo-diesel unit, featuring Bosch common rail direct fuel injection and a variable geometry turbocharger. It makes 141 hp (143 PS; 105 kW) at 3,500 rpm and 330 N⋅m (34 kg⋅m; 240 lb⋅ft) of torque at 1,800 rpm, up from the previous 2.5-litre SOHC indirect injection turbo-diesel unit which makes 121 hp (123 PS; 90 kW) and 262 N⋅m (26.7 kg⋅m; 193 lb⋅ft) of torque. While the larger 3.0-litre engine peaks with 154 hp (156 PS; 115 kW) at 3,200 rpm and 380 N⋅m (39 kg⋅m; 280 lb⋅ft) at 1,800 rpm. Both engines were double-overhead camshaft.

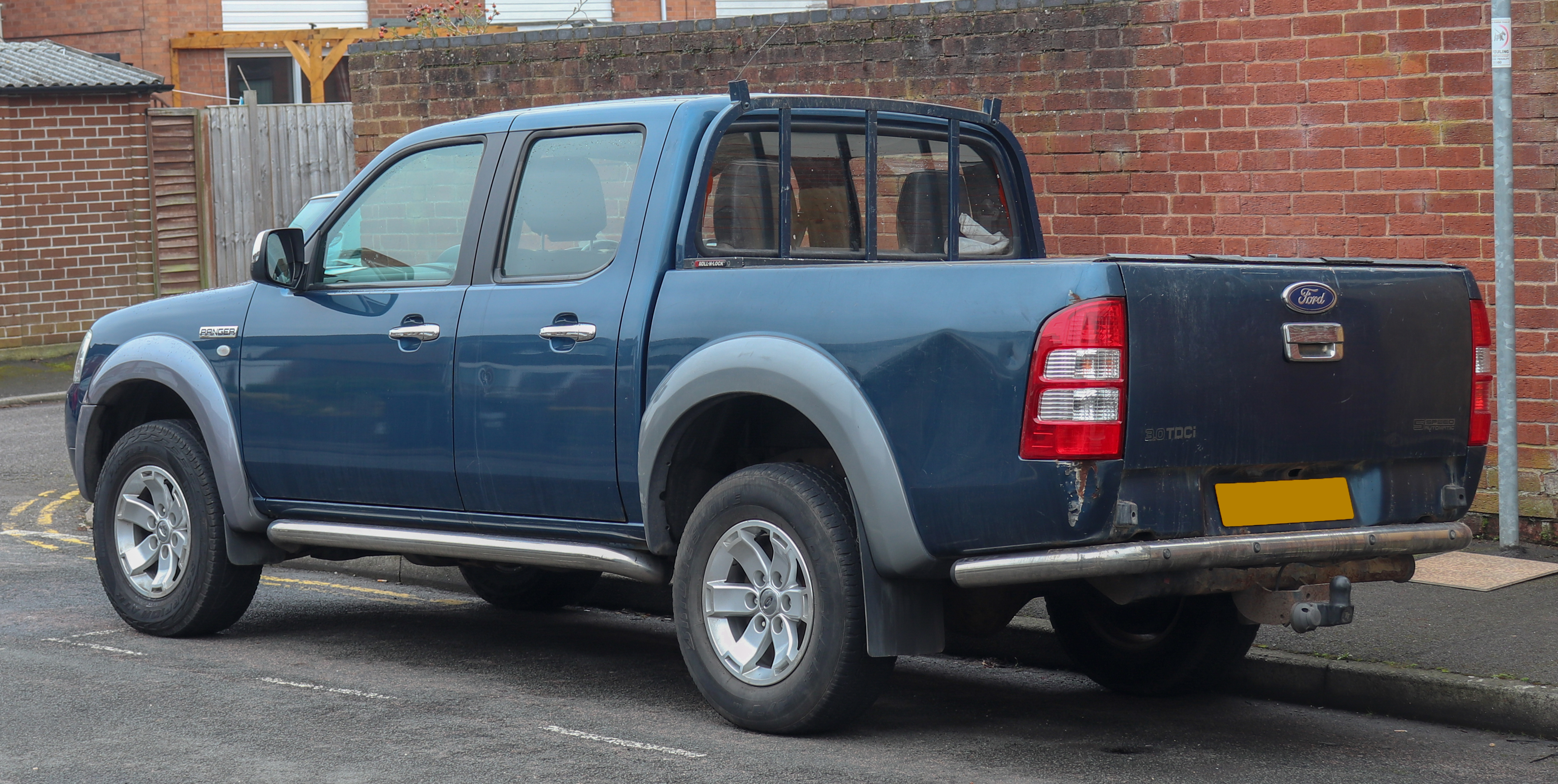
Ford Ranger dual cab (PJ; pre-facelift)

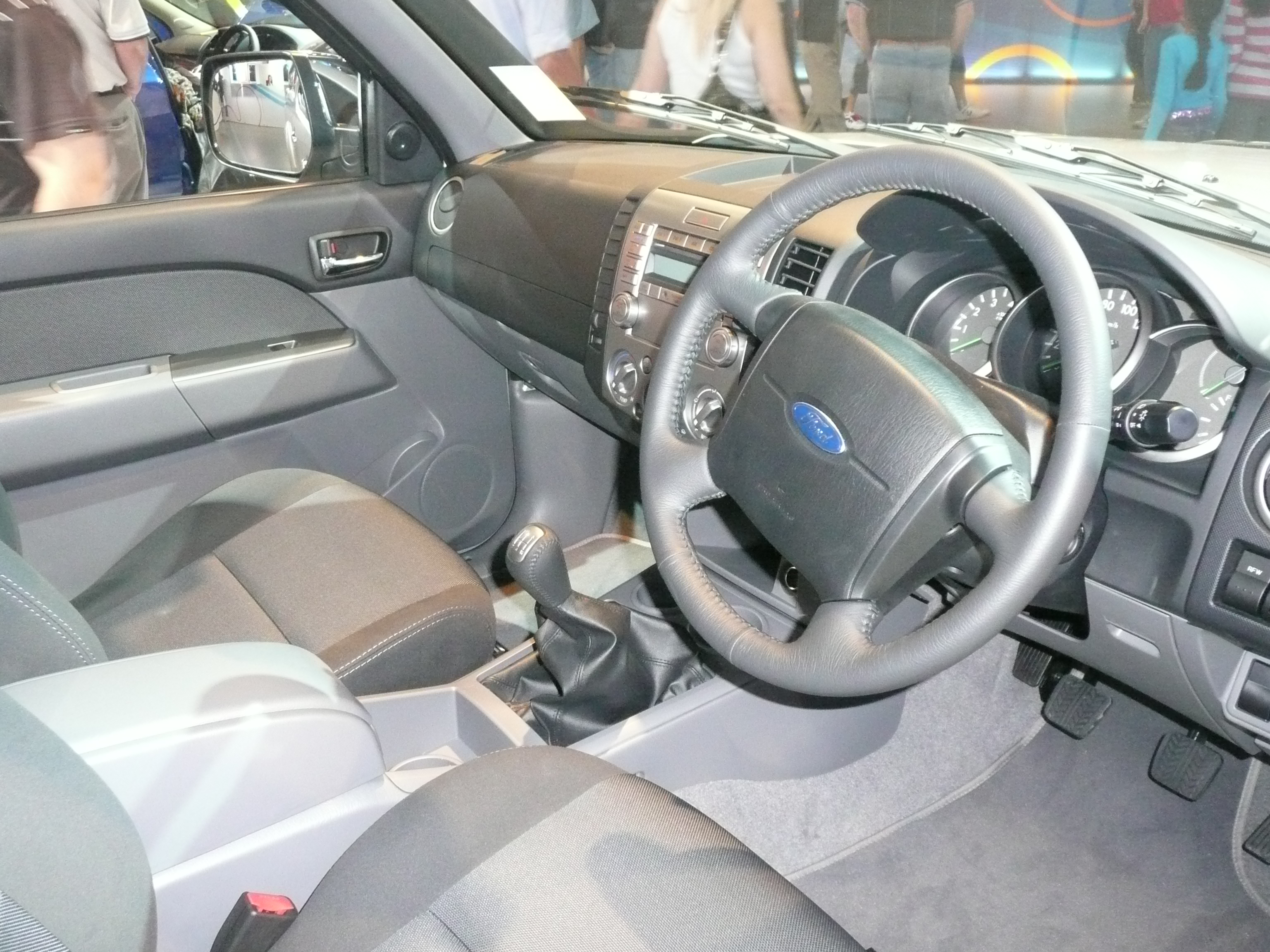
Interior (pre-facelift)

=== Facelift ===
The Ranger received a facelift in 2009. Designated as the PK Ranger, it has received new front and rear styling which was previously previewed by the Ford Ranger Max Concept at the 2008 Thailand International Motor Expo. It featured a new three-bar grille, new front bumper, and a redesigned bonnet. Other changes include the clear tail lamp design, new exterior mirrors, side air vents and new tailgate cladding. A new flagship Wildtrak sports trim was also introduced. Inside changes include newly designed seats and door panels, as well as new colors and trimmings.

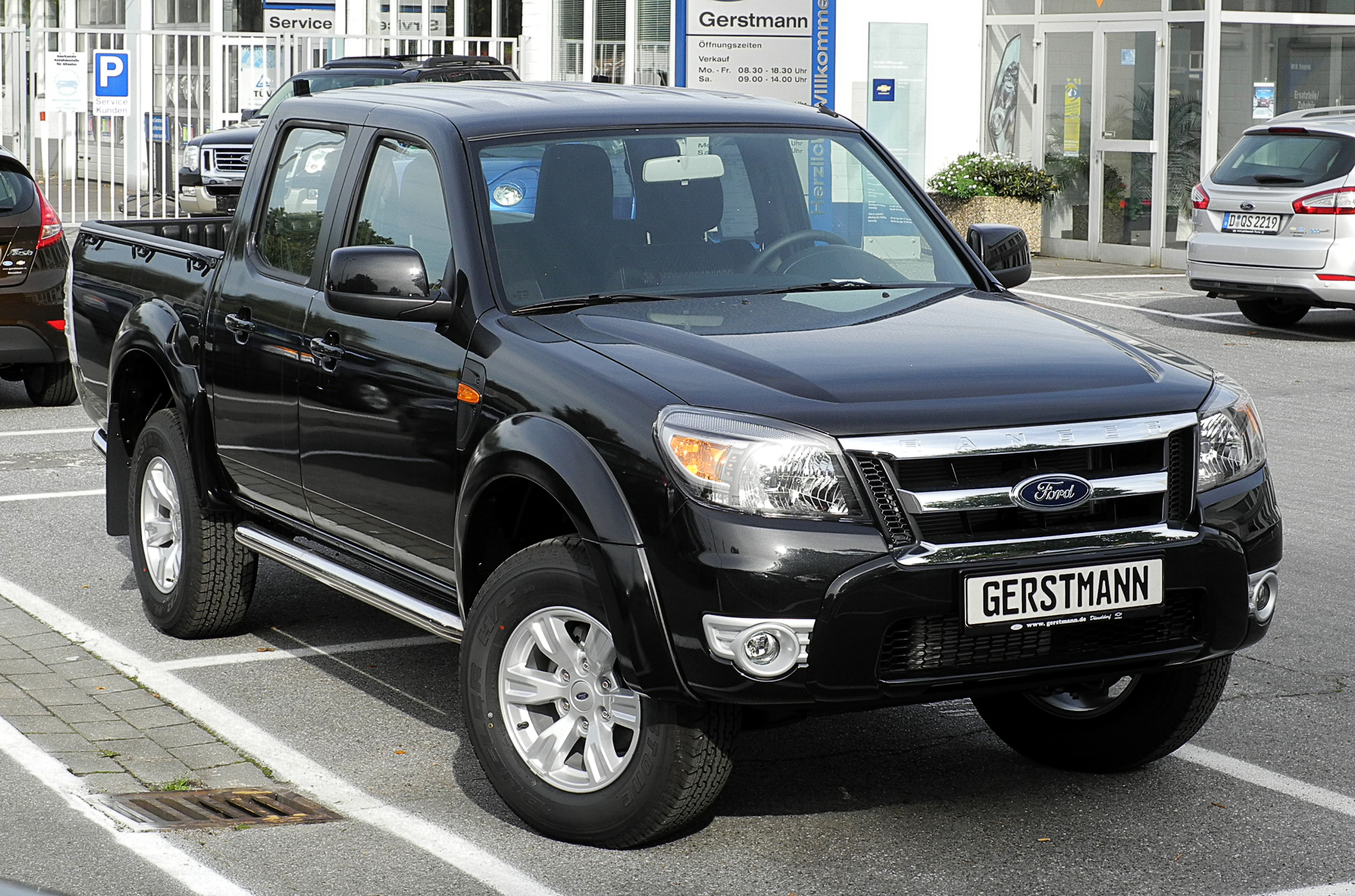
Ford Ranger dual cab (PK; facelift)

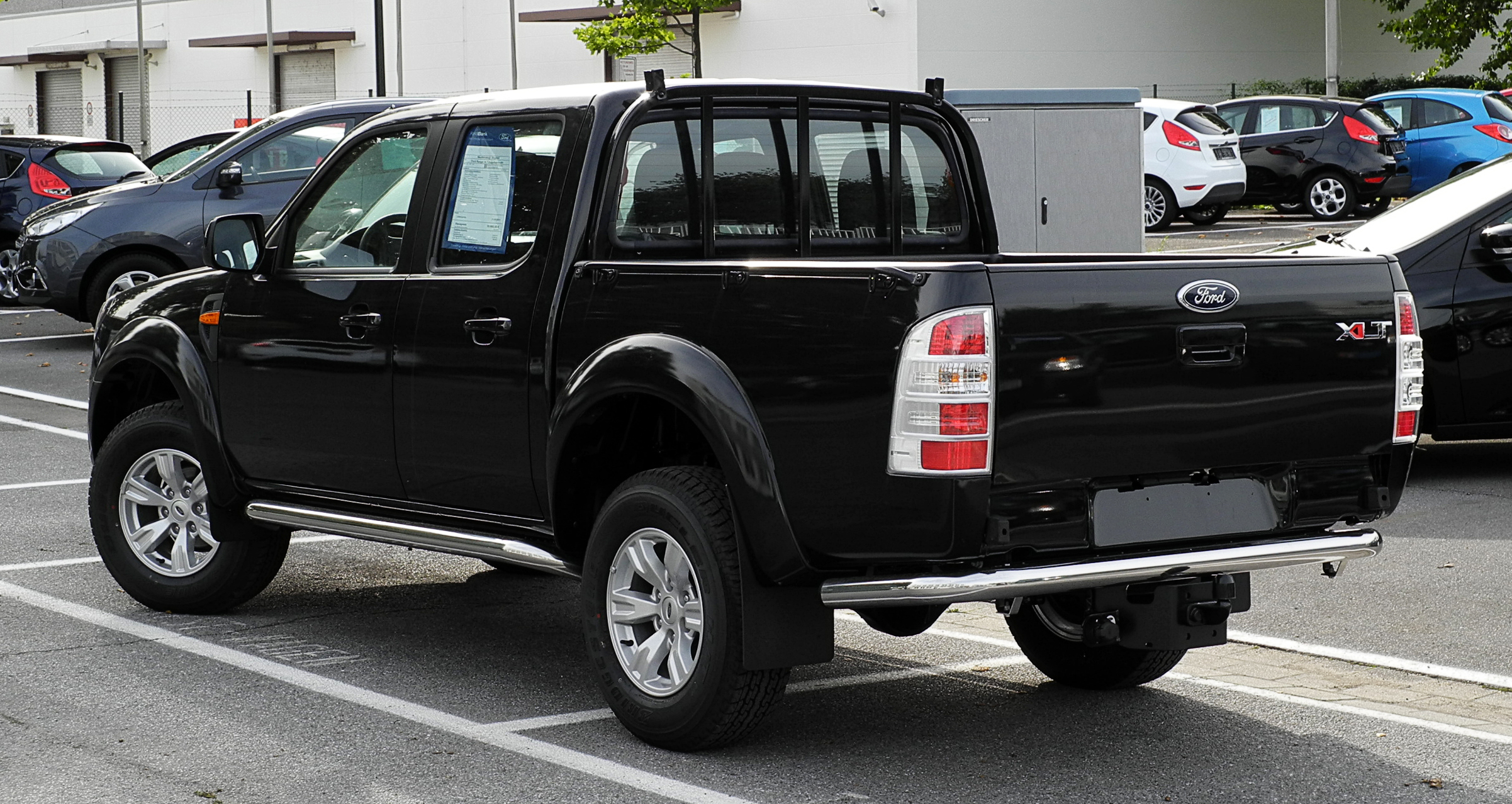
Ford Ranger dual cab (PK; facelift)

=== Safety ===
ANCAP test results* Ford Ranger 4x4 dual cab variants (2008)
Test	Score
Overall	3 /5 stars
Frontal offset	6.45/16
Side impact	16/16
Pole	Not Assessed
Seat belt reminders	0/3
Whiplash protection	Not Assessed
Pedestrian protection	Poor
Electronic stability control	Not Available

== Third generation (P375/PX; 2011) ==
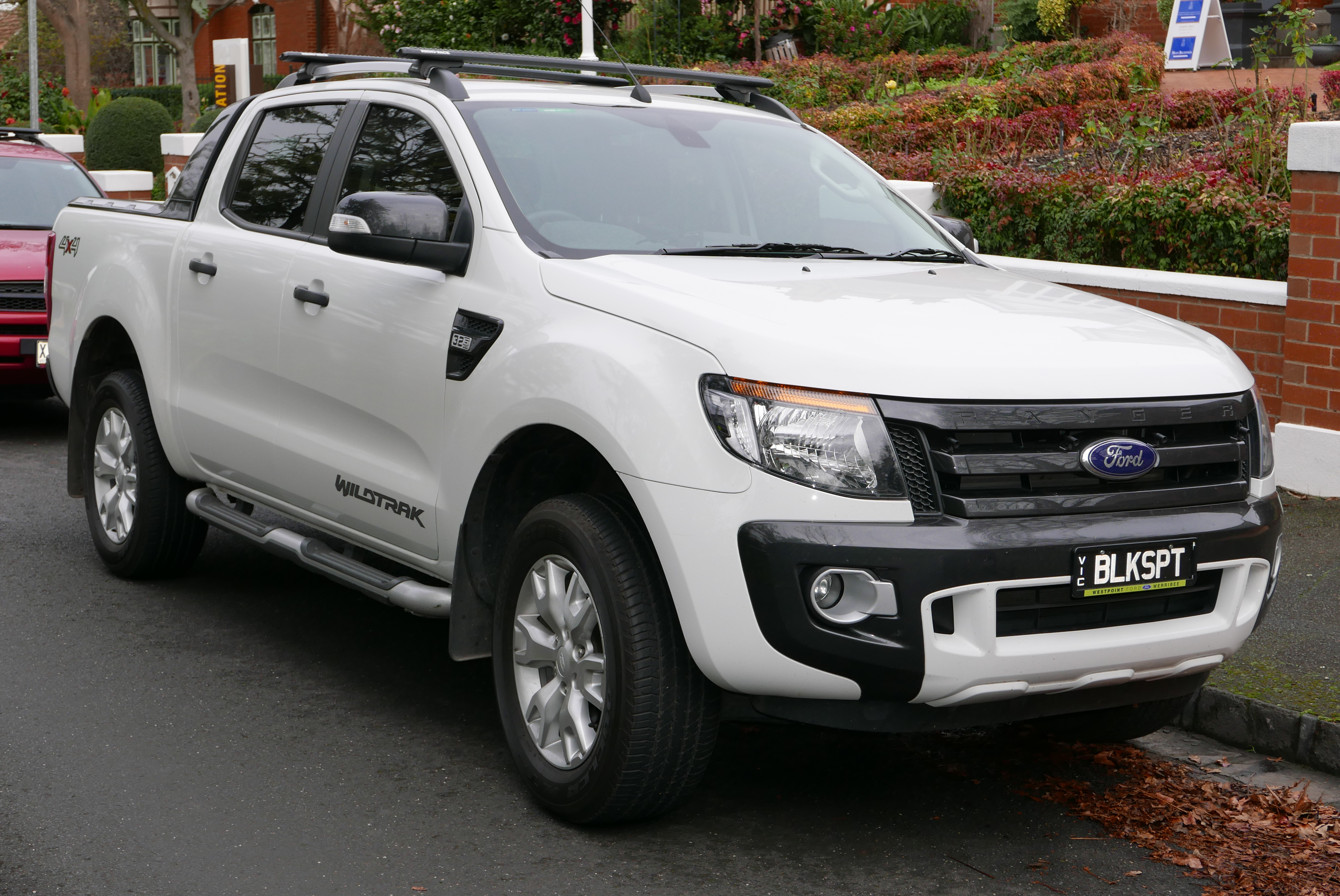
Ford Ranger (P375)

In 2011, the Ranger nameplate was consolidated onto a single globally-marketed model, the P375 Ranger (known as the PX series in Australia). Based on the new T6 platform, it replaced both the 1998–2012 Ranger which was sold in North and South America, and the Mazda-based PJ/PK Ranger which was sold in Asia-Pacific, Latin America and Europe regions. Designed by Ford Australia, the T6 Ranger was unveiled at the Australian International Motor Show in Sydney in October 2010, with its production started in mid-2011. The P375 Ranger is also built and sold in North America starting from January 2019.

== Fourth generation (P703/RA; 2022) ==
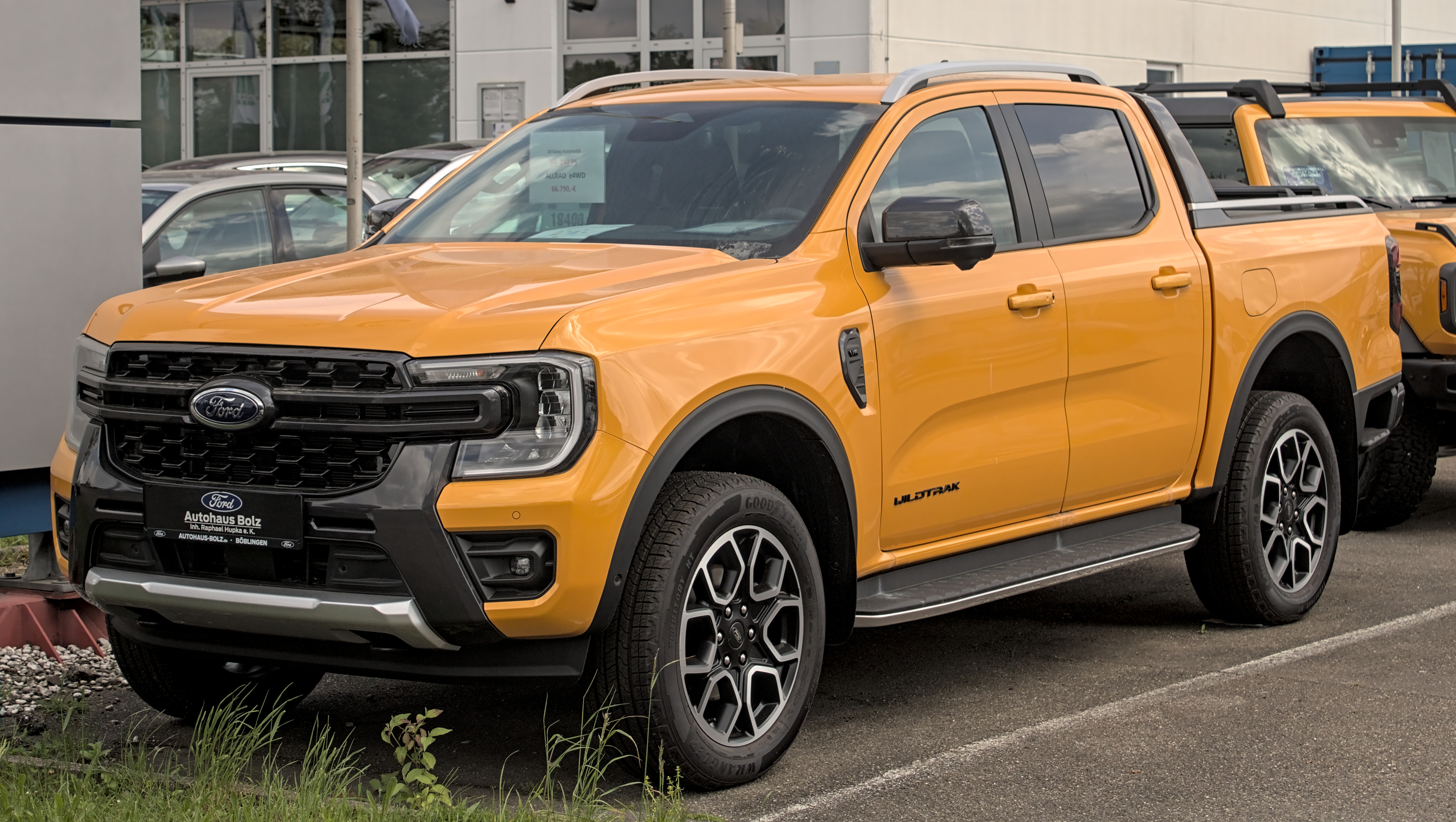
Ford Ranger (P703)

The P375 Ranger is succeeded by the P703 Ranger (known as the RA series in Australia), which is the fourth-generation international Ranger and the fifth-generation Ranger in North America. It was introduced in November 2021, continuing to use the T6 platform with revisions. The second-generation Volkswagen Amarok also uses the same platform following a deal between Ford and Volkswagen.
