= Mazda CX-3 =

Subcompact crossover SUV

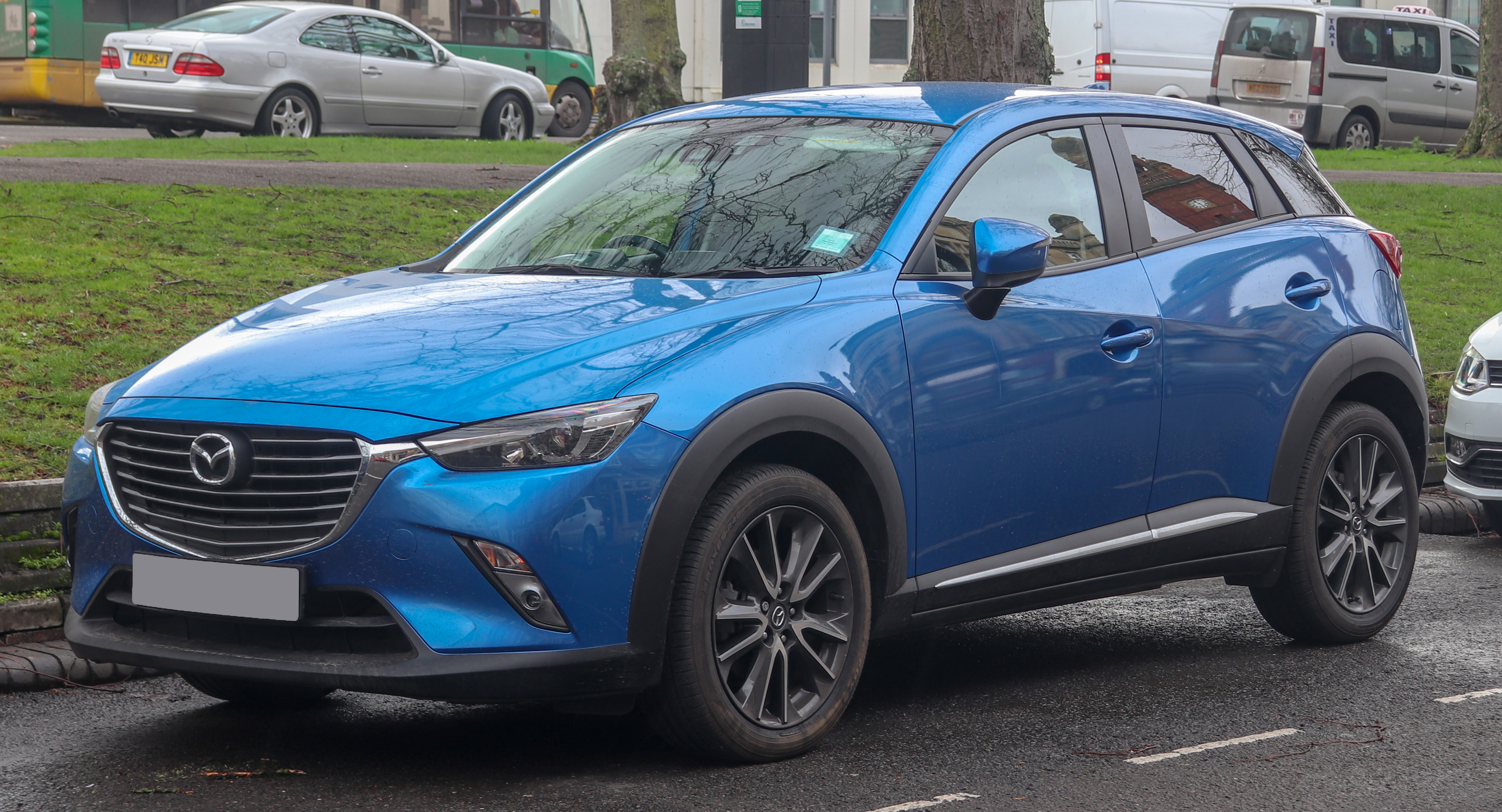

Overview
- Manufacturer: Mazda
- Model code: DK
- Production: 2014–present
- Model years: 2015–2026 (Japan); 2015–present (Australia); 2016–present (Thailand); 2016–present (Mexico); 2016–2021 (United States/Europe); 2016–2022 (Canada)
- Assembly: Japan: Hiroshima (Ujina Plant No. 1; 2014–2022); Hōfu (Hōfu Plant No. 1; 2016–2022); Mexico: Salamanca, Guanajuato (MMVO, since 2022); Thailand: Rayong (AutoAlliance Thailand)
- Designer: Yōichi Matsuda

Body and chassis
- Class: Subcompact crossover SUV (B)
- Body style: 5-door SUV
- Layout: Front-engine, front-wheel-drive; Front-engine, all-wheel-drive
- Platform: Skyactiv-B
- Related: Mazda2 (DJ/DL)

Powertrain
- Engine: Petrol: 1.5 L Skyactiv-G F-P5 I4; 2.0 L Skyactiv-G PE-VPS I4; Diesel: 1.5 L Skyactiv-D S5-DPTS/S5-DPTR I4; 1.8 L Skyactiv-D S8-DPTS/S8-DPTR I4
- Transmission: 6-speed Skyactiv-MT manual; 6-speed Skyactiv-Drive automatic

Dimensions
- Wheelbase: 2,570 mm (101.2 in)
- Length: 4,275 mm (168.3 in)
- Width: 1,765 mm (69.5 in)
- Height: 1,535 mm (60.4 in)
- Curb weight: 1,291–1,339 kg (2,847–2,952 lb)

Chronology
- Successor: Mazda CX-30 (United States and Europe)

The Mazda CX-3 is a subcompact crossover SUV (B-segment) manufactured by Mazda. Based on the same platform as the third-generation Mazda2, it was revealed on 19 November 2014 ahead of the 2014 Los Angeles Auto Show as a production vehicle for the 2016 model year.

Since mid-2022, the production in Japan was shifted to Mexico and Thailand. Since then, sales of the CX-3 in the Japanese market are served by imported units from Thailand.

== Markets ==
=== United States ===
CX-3 sales began in the United States in the end of 2015, as a model for 2016. It replaced the similar Mazda2 subcompact in the market in North America.

Across the model lineup, power is provided by an updated (2018) 2.0-litre Skyactiv-G engine that develops 146 bhp (109 kW) and 148 lb ft (201 Nm) of torque. It is connected to a six speed automatic transmission that can be paired to an optional all wheel drive system.

In the United States, the entry level CX-3 Sport, Touring and Grand Touring all feature cruise control, power windows/lock, and a 60/40 split folding rear seat. Other highlights include a rearview camera, Bluetooth connectivity, and an infotainment system, Mazda Connect, with a 7-inch display as standard equipment.

For the 2020 model year in the United States, the Touring and Grand Touring trim levels were dropped in order to make room for the Mazda CX-30 leaving only the base Sport trim, with AWD being the only option. Newly standard equipment for the Sport trim include Apple CarPlay and Android Auto as well as the i-Activesense safety suite.

The CX-3 was discontinued in United States for 2022, marking 2021 as the final model year. It was effectively replaced by the Mazda CX-30, which was introduced in 2020.

=== Asia ===
In Asia, the CX-3 is sold in countries such as Malaysia, Singapore, Thailand, Philippines and Indonesia, and was introduced progressively from 2016. Similarly, the CX-3 is offered with a 2.0-litre four-cylinder petrol engine or a 1.5-litre Skyactiv-D diesel engine.

The Japanese-market CX-3 was discontinued in 2026, without a successor model.

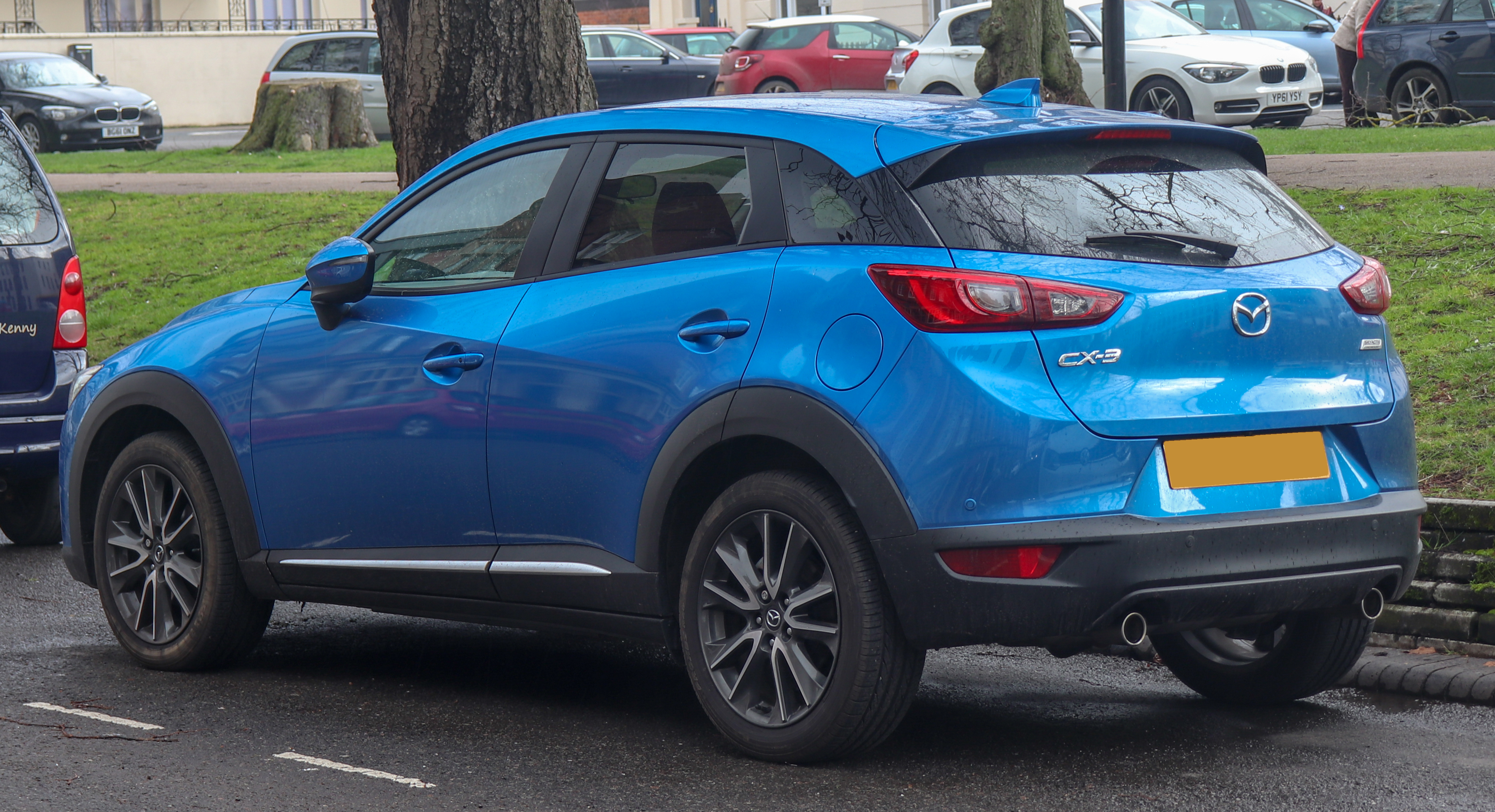
2017 Mazda CX-3 Sport NAV (UK, pre-facelift)

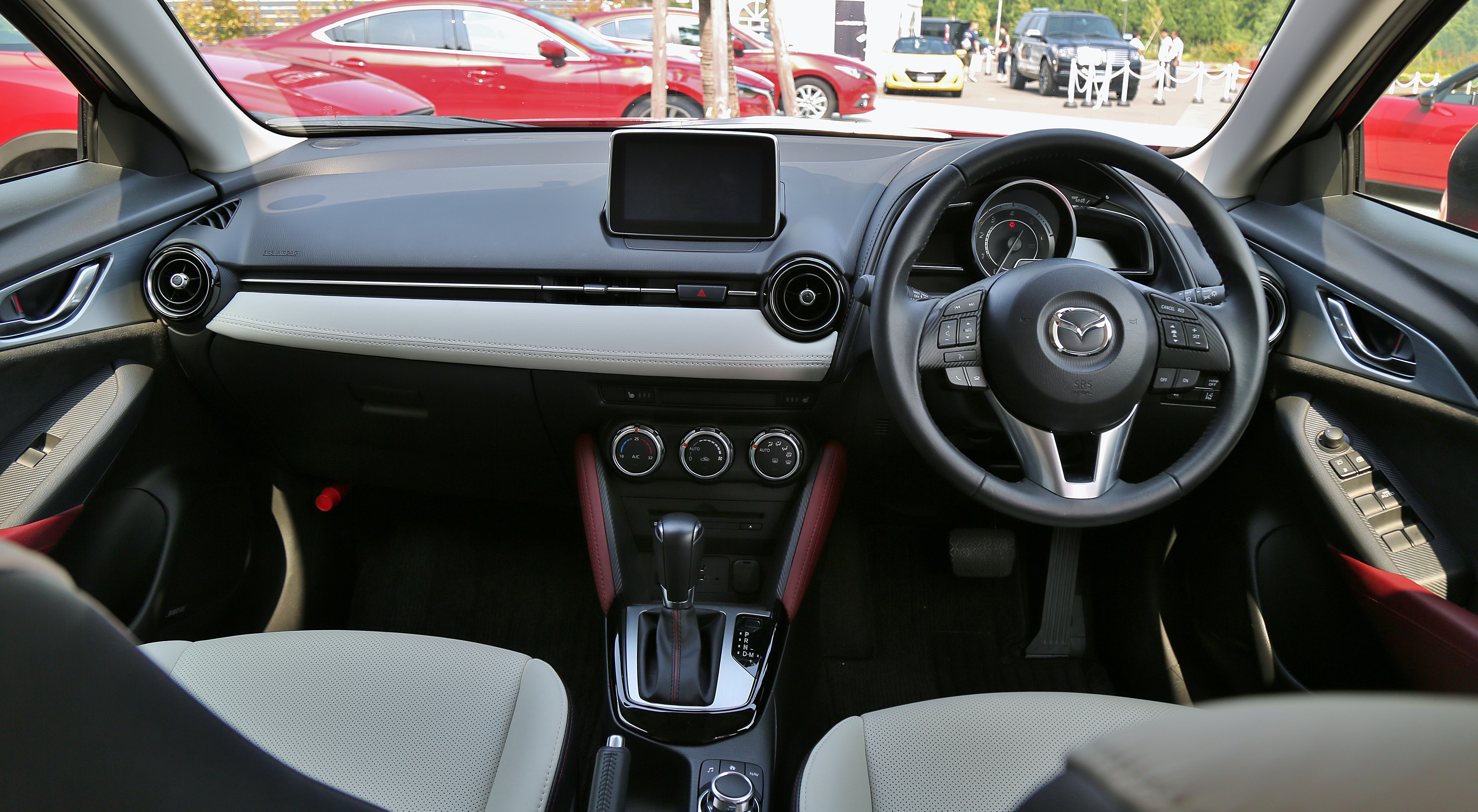
Interior (pre-facelift)

=== Europe ===
CX-3 sales in Europe ended in December 2021.

== Facelift ==
The CX-3 received a minor facelift in 2018 including a new split horizontal chrome grille design, foglamps, tail lamps, minor tweaks to the chassis, added safety features, centre console armrest and replaced the manual handbrake with an electronic parking brake.

Starting from 23 April 2020, Mazda added a 1.5-litre four-cylinder Skyactiv-G petrol engine option, for the market in Japan. The engine option was also introduced in Indonesia, in Egypt, in Singapore and in Malaysia.

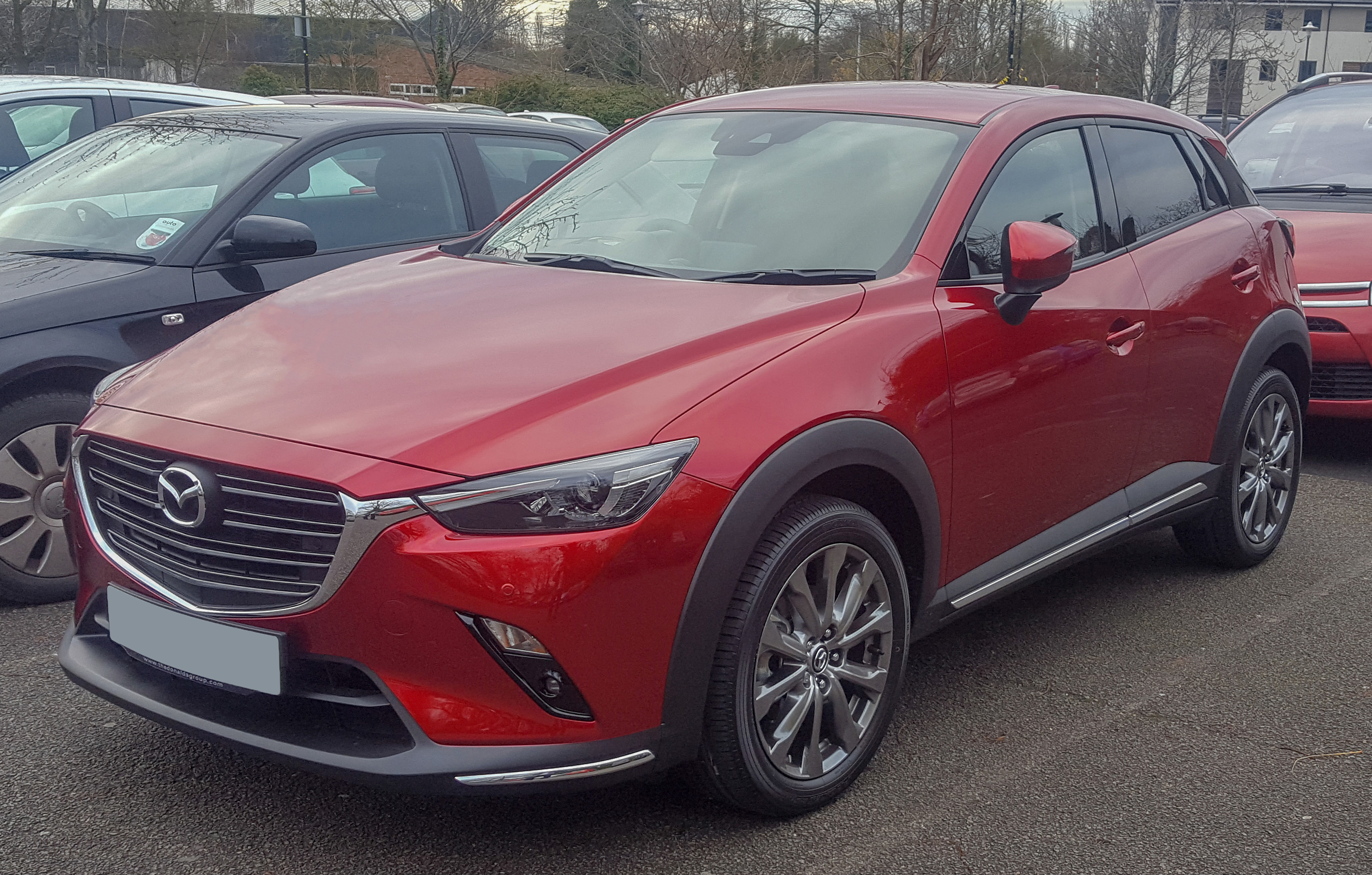
2018 Mazda CX-3 Sport (UK; facelift)

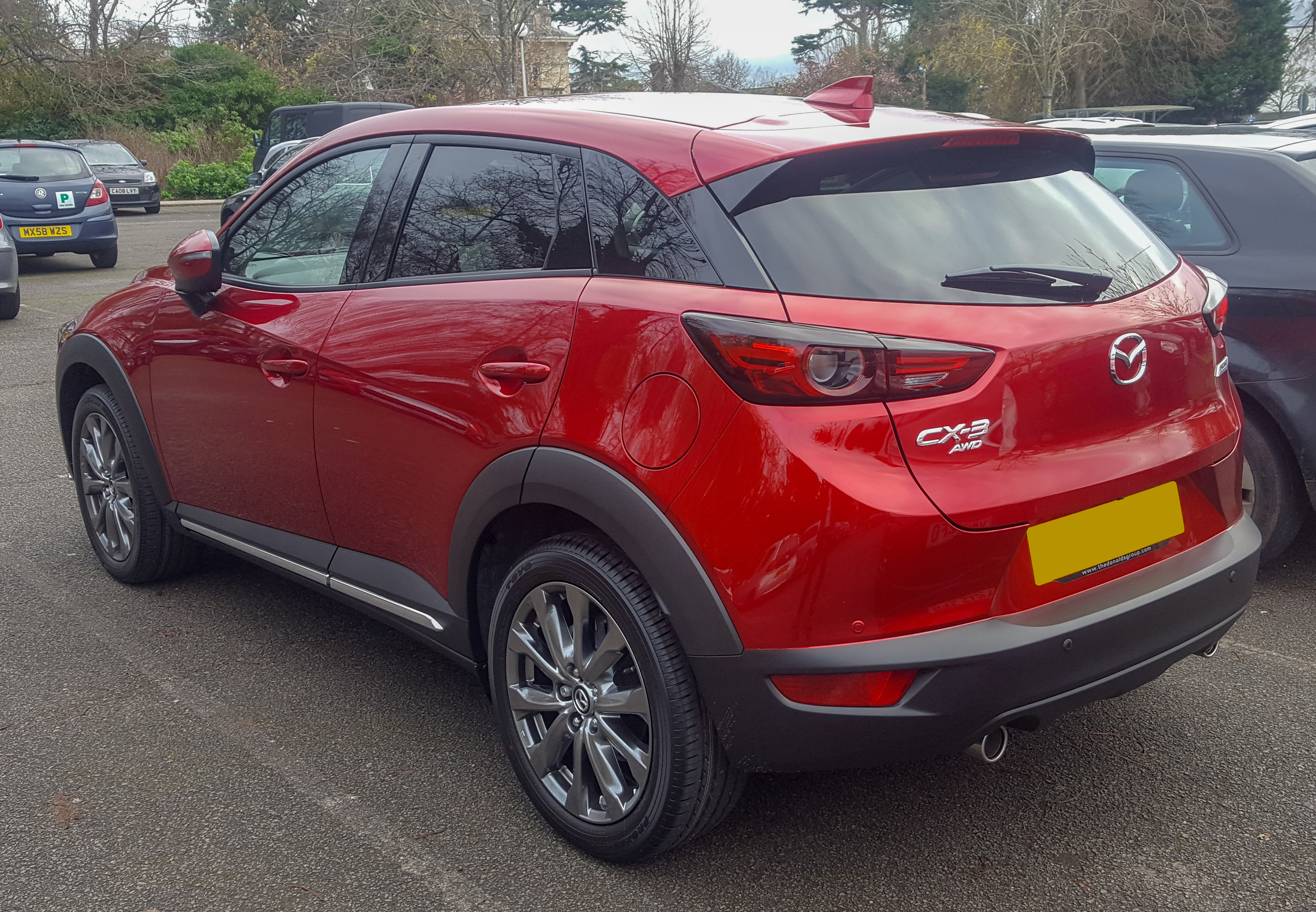
2018 Mazda CX-3 Sport (UK; facelift)

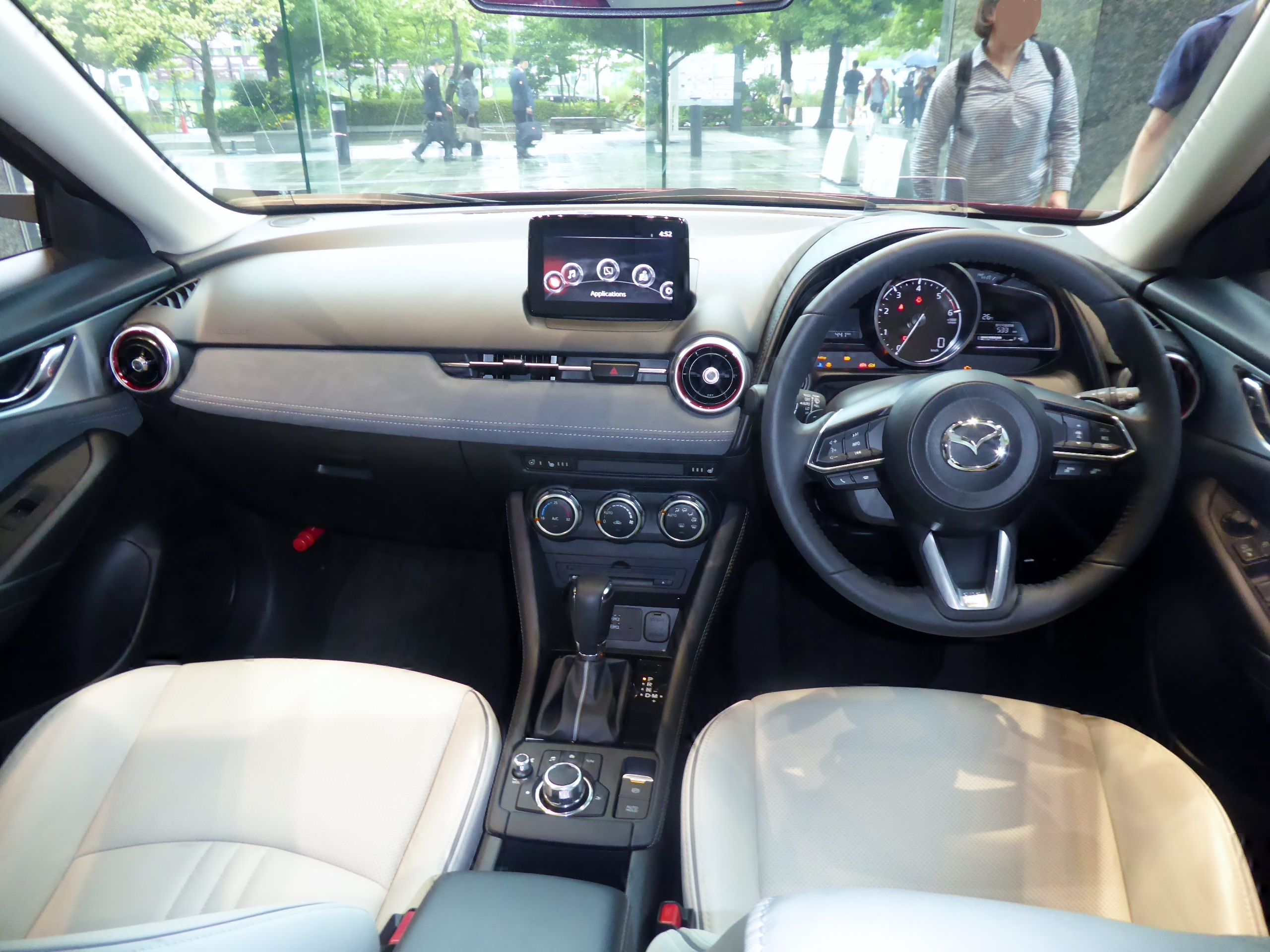
Interior (facelift)

== Powertrain ==
The CX-3 is offered with an array of engines, such as a 1.5-litre and 2.0-litre four-cylinder Skyactiv-G petrol engine, and a 1.5-litre Skyactiv-D diesel engine.

Type	Model	Engine code	Displacement	Power	Torque	Transmission	Layout	Cal. years
Petrol	Skyactiv-G 1.5	F-P5	1,496 cc (1.5 L) I4	82 kW (110 hp; 111 PS) @ 6,000 rpm	144 N⋅m (14.7 kg⋅m; 106 lb⋅ft) @ 4,000 rpm	6-speed Skyactiv-Drive automatic	FWD	2020–present
Petrol	Skyactiv-G 1.5	F-P5	1,496 cc (1.5 L) I4	82 kW (110 hp; 111 PS) @ 6,000 rpm	144 N⋅m (14.7 kg⋅m; 106 lb⋅ft) @ 4,000 rpm	6-speed Skyactiv-Drive automatic	AWD	2020–present
Petrol	Skyactiv-G 2.0	Skyactiv-G PE-VPS	1,998 cc (2.0 L) I4	88 kW (118 hp; 120 PS) @ 6,000 rpm	204 N⋅m (20.8 kg⋅m; 150 lb⋅ft) @ 2,800 rpm	6-speed Skyactiv-MT manual; 6-speed Skyactiv-Drive automatic	FWD	2015–2021
Petrol	Skyactiv-G 2.0	Skyactiv-G PE-VPS	1,998 cc (2.0 L) I4	110 kW (148 hp; 150 PS) @ 6,000 rpm	195 N⋅m (19.9 kg⋅m; 144 lb⋅ft) @ 2,800 rpm	6-speed Skyactiv-MT manual; 6-speed Skyactiv-Drive automatic	FWD	2015–present
Petrol	Skyactiv-G 2.0	Skyactiv-G PE-VPS	1,998 cc (2.0 L) I4	110 kW (148 hp; 150 PS) @ 6,000 rpm	195 N⋅m (19.9 kg⋅m; 144 lb⋅ft) @ 2,800 rpm	6-speed Skyactiv-MT manual; 6-speed Skyactiv-Drive automatic	AWD	2015–present
Diesel	Skyactiv-D 1.5	S5-DPTS/S5-DPTR	1,499 cc (1.5 L) I4	77 kW (103 hp; 105 PS) @ 4,000 rpm	270 N⋅m (27.5 kg⋅m; 199 lb⋅ft) @ 1,600–2,500 rpm	6-speed Skyactiv-MT manual; 6-speed Skyactiv-Drive automatic	FWD	2015–2018
Diesel	Skyactiv-D 1.5	S5-DPTS/S5-DPTR	1,499 cc (1.5 L) I4	77 kW (103 hp; 105 PS) @ 4,000 rpm	270 N⋅m (27.5 kg⋅m; 199 lb⋅ft) @ 1,600–2,500 rpm	6-speed Skyactiv-MT manual; 6-speed Skyactiv-Drive automatic	AWD	2015–2018
Diesel	Skyactiv-D 1.8	S8-DPTS/S8-DPTR	1,759 cc (1.8 L) I4	86 kW (115 hp; 117 PS) @ 4,000 rpm	270 N⋅m (27.5 kg⋅m; 199 lb⋅ft) @ 1,600–2,600 rpm	6-speed Skyactiv-MT manual; 6-speed Skyactiv-Drive automatic	FWD	2015–present
Diesel	Skyactiv-D 1.8	S8-DPTS/S8-DPTR	1,759 cc (1.8 L) I4	86 kW (115 hp; 117 PS) @ 4,000 rpm	270 N⋅m (27.5 kg⋅m; 199 lb⋅ft) @ 1,600–2,600 rpm	6-speed Skyactiv-MT manual; 6-speed Skyactiv-Drive automatic	AWD	2015–present

== Safety ==
ANCAP test results Mazda CX-3 (2015)
Test	Score
Overall	5 /5 stars
Frontal offset	15.33/16
Side impact	16/16
Pole	2/2
Seat belt reminders	3/3
Whiplash protection	Good
Pedestrian protection	Good
Electronic stability control	Standard

== Awards and recognition ==
- 2015 Red Dot Design Award, Germany
- 2016 Yahoo Autos Savvy Ride of the Year
- 2016 IIHS Top Safety Pick+
- 2016 World Car Design of the Year Finalist
- 2016 Car of the Year Thailand
- 2016 Best Compact SUV, Fleet News Awards, UK
- 2016 Automobile Journalists Association of Canada Canadian Utility Vehicle of the Year
- 2016 Automobile Journalists Association of Canada Canadian Green Utility Vehicle of the Year
- 2018 Best City SUV, Drive Car of the Year, Australia

== Sales and production ==
As of December 2021, the cumulative global production volume of CX-3 is 829,843 units, and the sales volume is 820,003 units.

Year	Sales										Global production
Year	Japan	Australia	U.S.	Canada	Mexico	Europe	Thailand	Indonesia	Malaysia	Vietnam	Global production
2015	30,020	12,656	6,406	6,861	1,581	24,232	1,321	—	69		N/A
2016	19,872	18,334	18,557	9,354	8,631	52,409	4,787	—	2,240		N/A
2017	16,202	17,490	16,355	10,938	12,855	53,871	3,812	848	1,241		137,094
2018	15,391	16,293	16,899	12,445	12,466	55,548	3,536	715	1,765		119,220
2019	16,604	14,813	16,229	10,850	9,257	61,962	1,971	575	875		92,505
2020	7,617	13,953	8,335	5,565	6,233	5,171	2,229	330	368		51,438
2021	8,408	12,873	6,374	5,314	5,027	13,879	3,746	1,026	333	1,596	N/A
2022	8,409	11,907	0	3,050	2,598	3,609	4,249	849	557	1,938	
2023	7,326	15,776	0	0	10,362		2,389	1,849	1,610	1,534	
2024	8,050	18,461	0	0	4,826		883	1,325	822	2,745	
2025								912	96	2,202	

== CX-3 Racing Concept ==
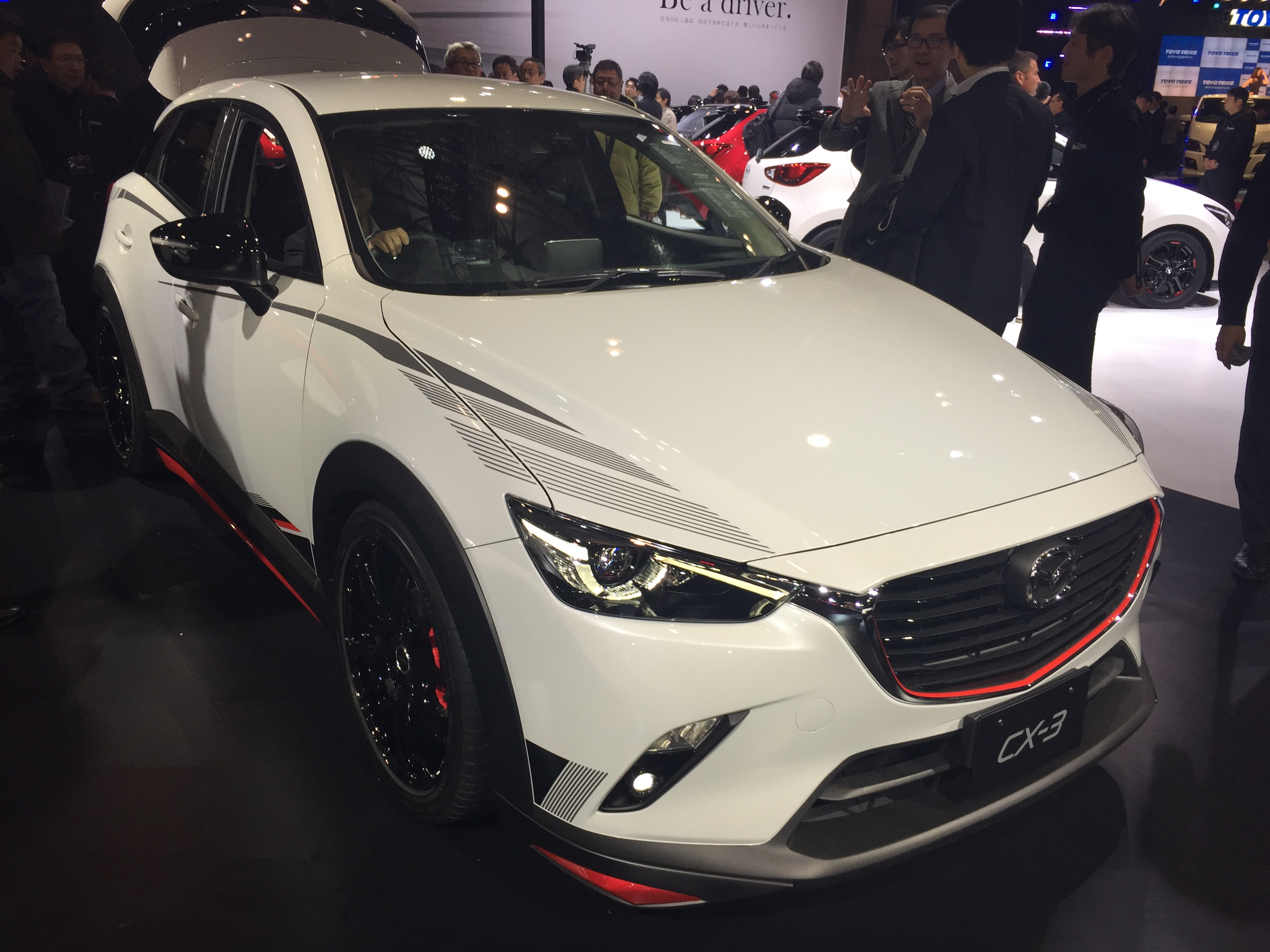
Mazda CX-3 Racing Concept at 2015 Tokyo Motor Show.

The Mazda CX-3 Racing Concept was unveiled at the 2015 Tokyo Auto Salon, and a few days later at the North American International Auto Show in Detroit. It sports front lip and roof spoilers, side skirts, coloured accents and larger 19 inch wheels and tires. The concept also rides on an adjustable suspension, and includes a racing air intake kit and a sports muffler.
