= Mazda CX-30 =

Subcompact crossover SUV

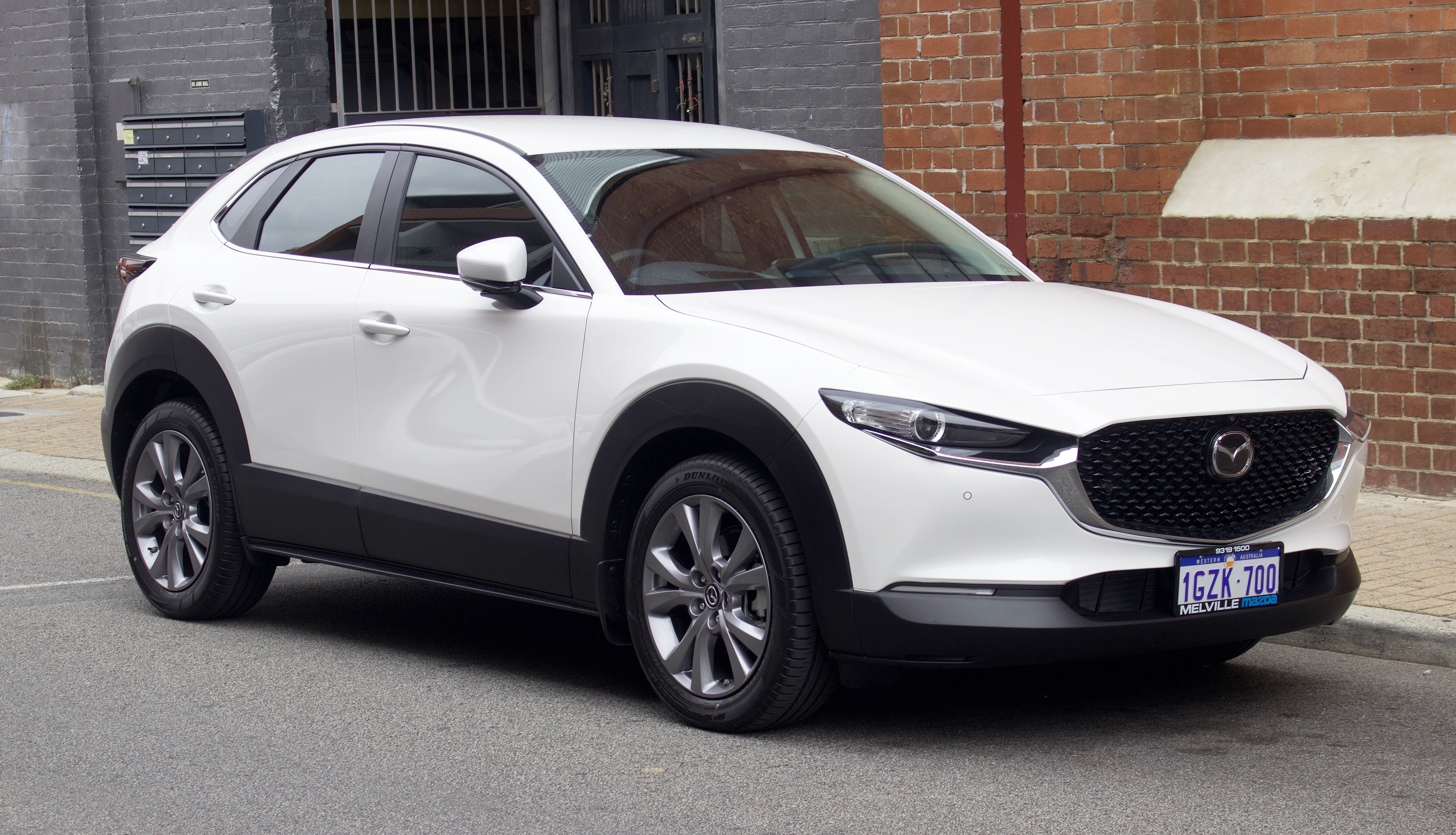

Overview
- Manufacturer: Mazda
- Model code: DM
- Production: 2019–present
- Model years: 2020–present
- Assembly: Japan: Hiroshima (Ujina Plant No. 1); China: Nanjing (Changan Mazda); Malaysia: Kulim, Kedah (Inokom); Mexico: Salamanca, Guanajuato (MMVO); Thailand: Rayong (AutoAlliance Thailand); Indonesia: Bogor, West Java (EPP); Russia: Vladivostok (Sollers JSC, until 2022)
- Designer: Ryo Yanagisawa

Body and chassis
- Class: Subcompact crossover SUV
- Body style: 5-door SUV
- Layout: Front-engine, front-wheel-drive; Front-engine, four-wheel-drive
- Platform: Small Product Group
- Related: Mazda3 (BP); Mazda CX-50; Mazda MX-30

Powertrain
- Engine: Gasoline: 2.0 L Skyactiv-G PE-VPS I4; 2.5 L Skyactiv-G PY-VPS I4; 2.5 L Skyactiv-G PY-VPTS I4-turbo; 2.0 L Skyactiv-X I4; Gasoline Hybrid/MHEV: 2.0 L e-Skyactiv-X I4; Diesel: 1.8 L Skyactiv-D I4
- Electric motor: 5.3 kW (6.5 hp) 24-volt e-motor (e-Skyactiv-X); 160 kW (217 hp) e-motor (CX-30 EV e-Skyactiv - China)
- Transmission: 6-speed Skyactiv-MT manual (1.8 L & 2.0 L); 6-speed Skyactiv-Drive automatic
- Hybrid drivetrain: MHEV (e-Skyactiv-X)
- Battery: 61.1 kWh lithium ion (CX-30 EV e-Skyactiv - China)

Dimensions
- Wheelbase: 2,655 mm (104.5 in)
- Length: 4,395 mm (173.0 in)
- Width: 1,795 mm (70.7 in)
- Height: 1,540 mm (60.6 in); 1,655 mm (65.2 in) (CX-30 EV e-Skyactiv - China)
- Curb weight: 1,380–1,530 kg (3,042–3,373 lb)

Chronology
- Predecessor: Mazda CX-3 (North America and Europe)

The Mazda CX-30 is a subcompact crossover SUV produced by Mazda. Based on the fourth-generation Mazda3, it debuted at the 2019 Geneva Motor Show, to slot in between the CX-3 and the CX-5. It went on sale in Japan on 24 October 2019, with global units being produced at Mazda's Hiroshima factory, North and South American units built in Salamanca, Guanajuato, Mexico, Thailand and initial Australian units made at the AutoAlliance Thailand plant in Rayong, and China-market units produced in Nanjing by Changan Mazda.

== Overview ==
The CX-30 features lightweight construction to improve performance and economy, and is offered in either front-wheel drive (FWD) or all-wheel drive (AWD). In the US, AWD became standard for the 2022 model year and the FWD model was removed from the lineup.

According to Naohito Saga, the CX-30's program manager, the CX-30 is targeted to drivers who are still single or are married and starting a family in the United States. Mazda chief designer Ryo Yanagisawa said that it will be more acceptable as a family car in Europe and Japan. Saga also noted that Mazda named the vehicle CX-30, to avoid confusion with the China-only CX-4.

The CX-30 was released in the UK in December 2019 and in North America in January 2020. It was launched in the Philippines on 28 November 2019, Malaysia on 15 January 2020, Indonesia on 28 January 2020, and Thailand on 6 March 2020. The 2.5 turbo model was released internationally in February 2021.

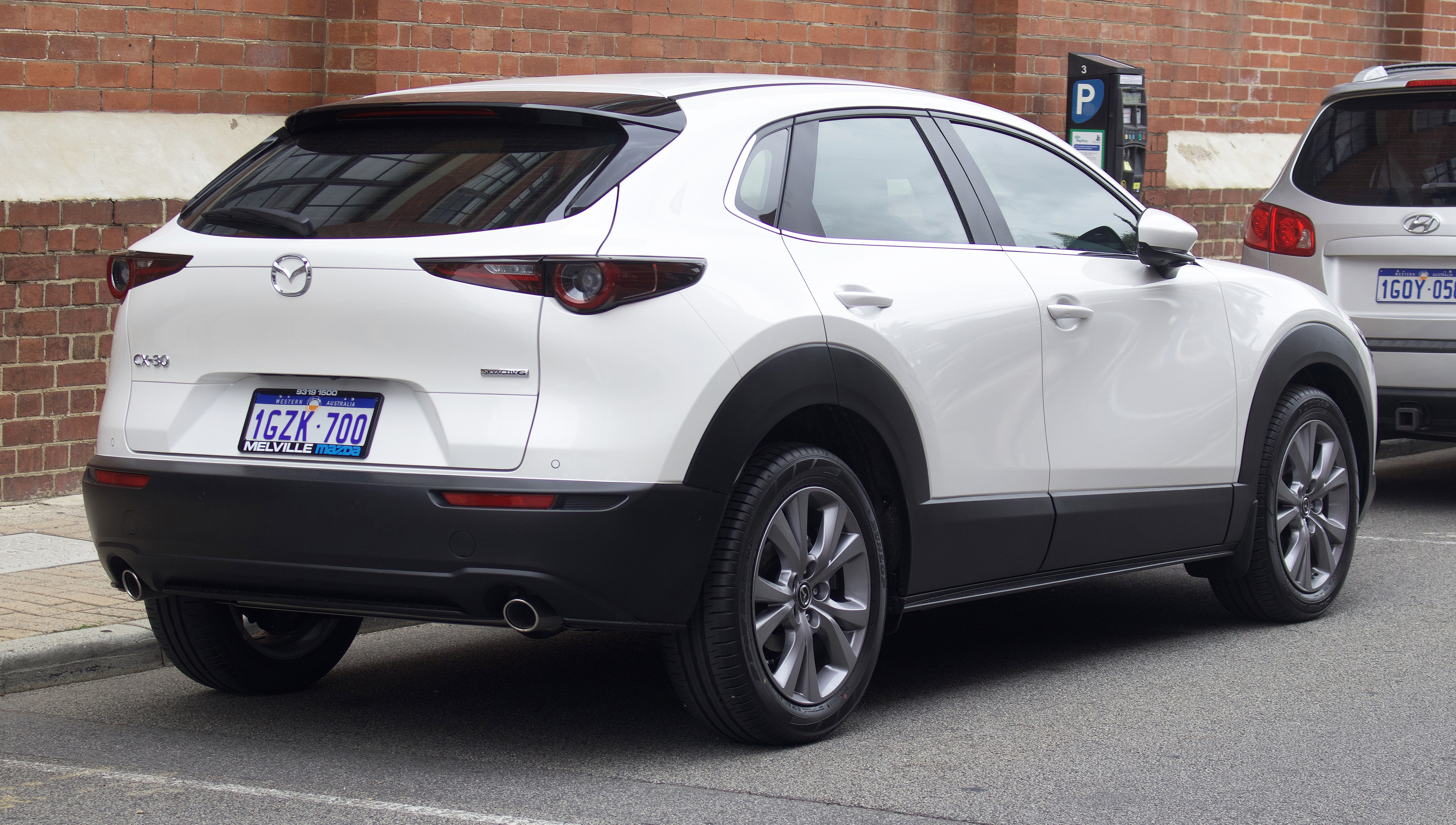
Rear view

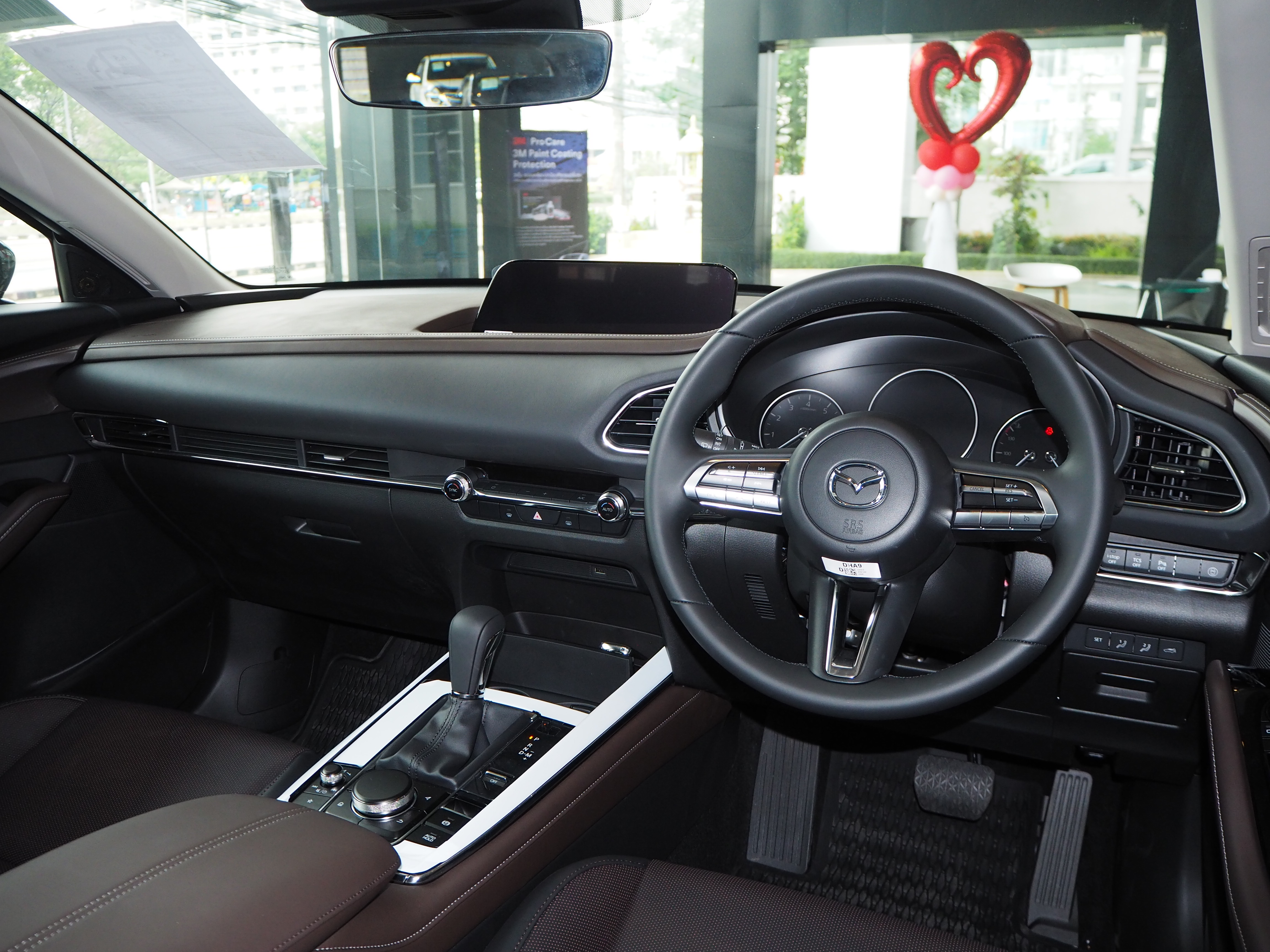
Interior

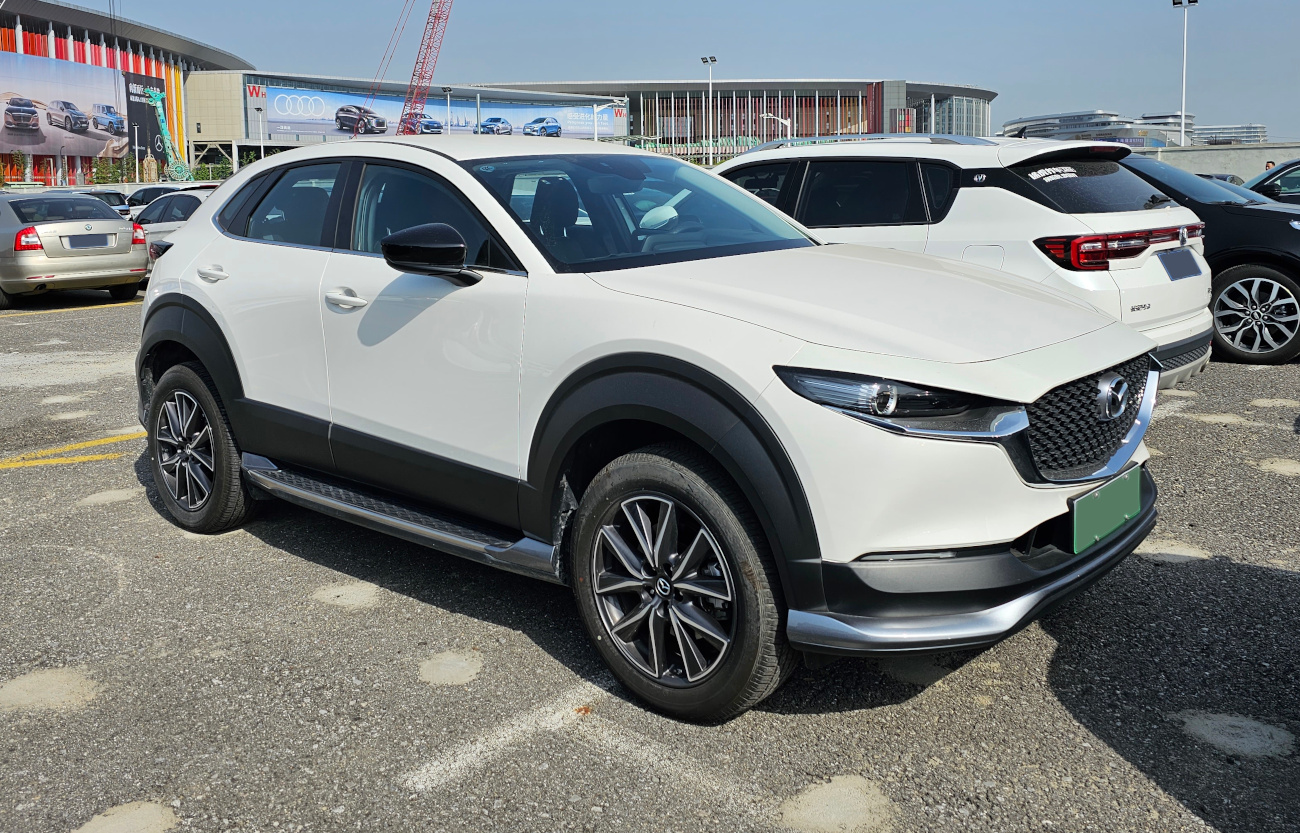
CX-30 EV (China)

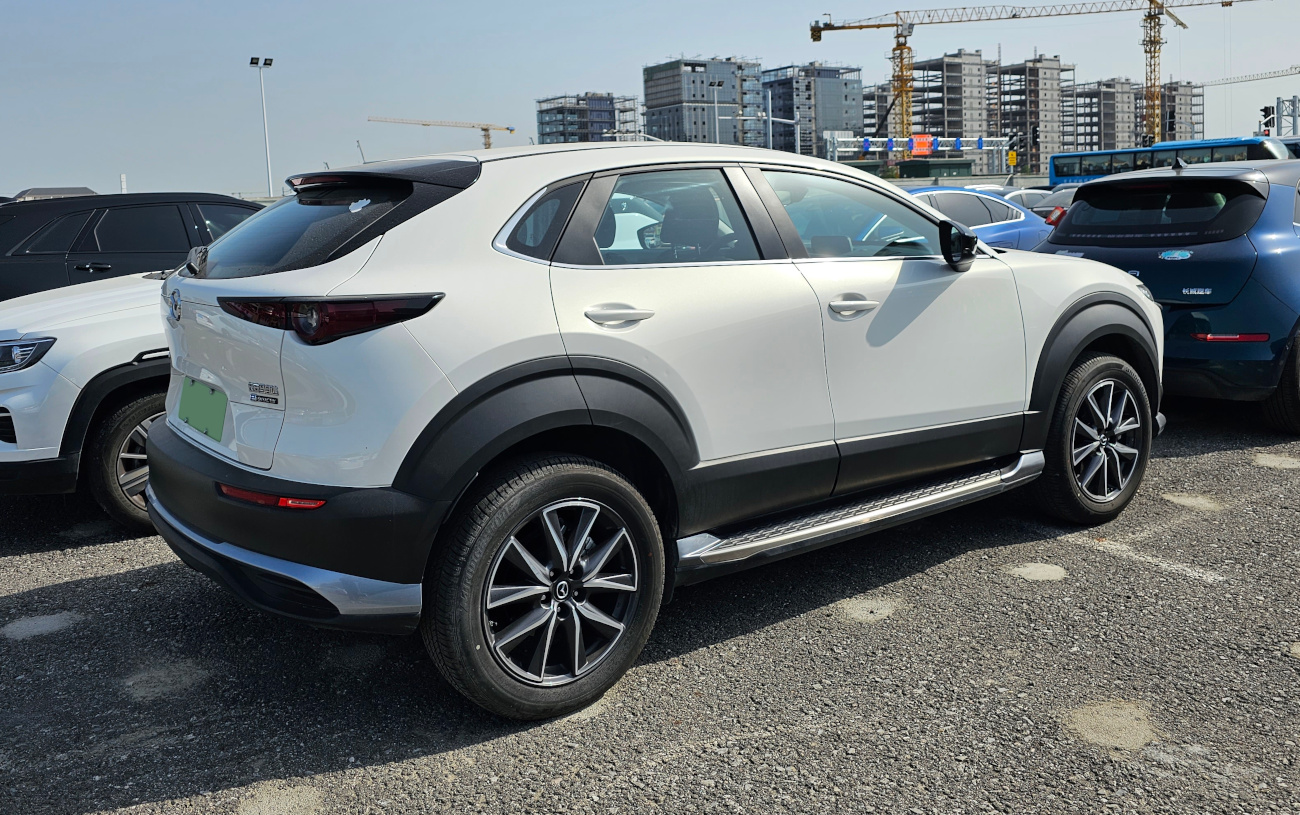
CX-30 EV (China)

== Engines ==
=== Powertrain ===
Year	Engine	Power	Torque	Transmission
2019–	1.8L S8-DPTS I4 turbo diesel	116 hp (118 PS; 87 kW)	200 lb⋅ft (270 N⋅m)	6-speed Skyactiv-Drive AT or Skyactiv-MT MT
2019–	2.0L PE-VPS I4	155 hp (157 PS; 116 kW)	150 lb⋅ft (203 N⋅m)	6-speed Skyactiv-Drive AT or Skyactiv-MT MT
2019–	2.5L PY-VPS I4	186 hp (189 PS; 139 kW) (2019–2022; 2026–) 191 hp (194 PS; 142 kW) (2023–2025)	186 lb⋅ft (252 N⋅m)	6-speed Skyactiv-Drive AT
2021–	2.5L PY-VPTS I4 turbo	250 hp (253 PS; 186 kW)	320 lb⋅ft (434 N⋅m)	6-speed Skyactiv-Drive AT

== Safety ==
=== Safety features ===
The CX-30 is equipped with seven airbags, Isofix, ABS, and EBS.

=== Euro NCAP ===
Euro NCAP test results for a LHD, 5-door hatchback variant on a 2019 registration:

Euro NCAP test results Mazda CX-30 (2019)
Test	Points	%
Overall:	5 /5 stars	
Adult occupant:	37.6	99%
Child occupant:	42.2	86%
Pedestrian:	38.7	80%
Safety assist:	10	77%

=== ANCAP ===
ANCAP test results on an Australasian market RHD, 5-door small SUV variant on a 2020 registration (aligned with Euro NCAP):

ANCAP test results Mazda CX-30 (2019, aligned with Euro NCAP)
Test	Points	%
Overall:	5 /5 stars	
Adult occupant:	37.6	99%
Child occupant:	43.2	88%
Pedestrian:	38.7	80%
Safety assist:	9.9	76%

=== IIHS ===
==== 2021 ====
The 2021 CX-30 was awarded the "Top Safety Pick +" by the Insurance Institute for Highway Safety. It received overall Good and Superior ratings on all categories except the Premium trim built before October 2020, as it received a Poor rating on headlights due to the LED projector low beams creating excessive glare.

IIHS scores
Small overlap front (Driver)	Good
Small overlap front (Passenger)	Good
Moderate overlap front	Good
Side (original test)	Good
Roof strength	Good
Head restraints and seats	Good
Headlights (all trims except Premium, pre-October 2020)	Good
Headlights (Premium trim, pre-October 2020)	Poor
Front crash prevention (Vehicle-to-Vehicle)	Superior
Front crash prevention (Vehicle-to-Pedestrian, day)	Superior
Child seat anchors (LATCH) ease of use	Good+

==== 2022 to 2024 ====
From 2022 to 2024, the CX-30 was awarded the "Top Safety Pick +" by the IIHS.

IIHS scores
Small overlap front (Driver)	Good
Small overlap front (Passenger)	Good
Moderate overlap front	Good
Side (original test)	Good
Side (updated test)	Good
Roof strength	Good
Head restraints and seats	Good
Headlights	Good
Front crash prevention (Vehicle-to-Vehicle)	Superior
Front crash prevention (Vehicle-to-Pedestrian, day)	Superior
Child seat anchors (LATCH) ease of use	Good+

== Reception ==
The CX-30 received positive reviews upon its release. Top Gear gave it a score of 7 out of 10, with the verdict being: "Good car, the Mazda CX-30. Handles well, looks smart and has a lovely interior." Car and Driver rated it 9.5 out of 10, commenting that "If you're shopping small SUVs, the Mazda CX-30 should be at the top of your consideration list." Edmunds.com gave it a score of 7.9 out of 10, commenting that "Admittedly, it's a niche vehicle, but it has the potential to be a 'just-right' fit for car shoppers who want a slightly roomier and nicer vehicle than an subcompact crossover SUV but don't like the greater cost of bigger models such as the CX-5 or CR-V." Alan Taylor-Jones of Autocar gave the CX-30 four out of five stars, saying: "Satisfyingly agile and blessed with a truly high quality interior, the CX-30 is a tempting choice if you don’t need vast amounts of space inside."

On the other hand, Christian Seabaugh of Motor Trend was not impressed with the CX-30, saying that "The end result is that it feels neither sporty nor luxurious. Like the brand itself, the CX-30 (alongside the more successful CX-5) finds itself stuck in the middle. Worse still, it's a disappointing effort in a competitive class." What Car? rated the CX-30 three out of five stars, commenting that "Its real strength lies in its ability to feel as luxurious as premium brands in this class at a much cheaper price. Just remember that rear space is tight and the boot isn’t anything to write home about, either."

== Awards ==
The CX-30 won the 2020 Red Dot Design Award in the Passenger Car category, as well as the 2020 Autozeitung Design Trophy in the SUV category. It also received the 2019 Auto Bild Golden Steering Wheel Award in the SUV/crossover category for vehicles up to 4.4 meters in length and was named Thailand Car of the Year 2020 by the Thai Automotive Journalists Association, as well as the 2020 Editor's Choice Car of the Year by Top Gear Philippines.

In 2021, the CX-30 was named Car of the Year by Wheels magazine in Australia, and it was selected as a Top Pick for Subcompact SUV Under US$25,000 by Consumer Reports.

U.S. News & World Report ranked the Mazda CX-30 at No. 1 (tied with the Kia Soul and Hyundai Kona) on its list of Best Subcompact SUVs for 2022, giving it a score of 8.4 out of 10.

In 2024, the CX-30 was one of seven subcompact SUVs listed on Car and Driver's Editors' Choice.

== Sales ==
Year	Sales										Global production
Year	Japan	U.S.	Mexico	Canada	Europe (Note: Europe: 2020 EU 27 + UK + Switzerland + Norway + Iceland)	Australia	China	Colombia	Thailand	Malaysia (Note: Figures based on registration (Malaysia))	Global production
2019	9,068	899	2,073		14,438					5	
2020	27,006	38,064	7,313	9,017	48,801	8,998	18,120	5,629	5,725	1,271	178,921
2021	19,355	60,185	9,162	11,407	49,153	13,309	15,494	11,214	6,691	1,179	187,492
2022	16,176	52,808	5,093	6,863	35,126	13,891	11,063	6,578	6,092	1,238	172,057
2023	18,016	77,075	10,362	10,748		13,115	3,815	5,742	3,254	3,122	200,784
2024	13,717	96,515	24,542	14,260		12,672	2,920	7,820	1,859	4,707	234,295
2025		56,684	29,898	16,521			3,451			2,846	208,869
