= AutoAlliance Thailand =

Joint venture automobile assembly

Auto Alliance Co., Ltd.
- Type: Joint venture
- Industry: Automotive
- Founded: 1995; 31 years ago
- Headquarters: Bangkok, Thailand
- Products: Automobile
- Brands: Ford; Mazda
- Owners: Ford Motor Company; Mazda
- Website: autoalliance.co.th

Auto Alliance Co., Ltd. or AutoAlliance Thailand (AAT) is the name of a joint venture automobile assembly firm co-owned by Ford and Mazda in Rayong province, Thailand. Modeled after the Ford-Mazda AutoAlliance International joint venture in Flat Rock, Michigan, United States, AAT builds compact pickup trucks and sport utility vehicles primarily for the Southeast Asian market, with exports to Australia and other developing markets as well.

The factory in Thailand is designed to be similar to Mazda's Hofu plant, and is arranged as four squares.

== History ==
Ford's sales in Thailand began in 1913 with the Model T, and in 1961 Ford began assembling vehicles there. "Anglo-Thai Motors Company", Ford's distributor (which sold Ford Europe and Ford Australia products), announced in 1960 that it would build a factory in the country, with "Thai Motor Company" the result. This was the first time cars had been built in Thailand: Ford Capris and Cortinas were assembled locally using components from the UK. Mazda first began exporting utility vehicles to Thailand in 1950. In 1974 "Sukosol & Mazda Motor Industry" was founded, opening Mazda's first knock-down assembly plant in 1975.

Ford brought Thai Motor under its corporate umbrella in 1973, but closed the factory just three years later. Ford's presence returned in 1985 with the formation of the "New Era Company" to sell cars and trucks in the country.

Construction on the AutoAlliance plant began on 28 November 1995, and the plant began mass production on 29 May 1998. The grand opening ceremony on 1 July 1998, was attended by Chuan Leekpai, the then-prime minister of Thailand.

== Ford Thailand Manufacturing ==
A separate second plant for Ford, "Ford Thailand Manufacturing (FTM)" was opened in 2012. Located in Rayong, 14 km from AAT, the new plant has a production capacity of 150,000 vehicles a year, boosting the annual Ford Thailand production capacity to 445,000 vehicles. The US$450 million (THB 15 billion) 750,000 m^{2} (75 ha) assembly plant is fully integrated to support body assembly, paint, trim, and final assembly. Up to 85 percent of the plant's production will be for markets outside Thailand. Initially, it produced passenger cars including the Fiesta, Focus and EcoSport. The plant started manufacturing the Ranger pickup truck in 2016, and ended the production of passenger cars in 2018. In December 2021, Ford announced it had invested $900 million to modernise both the Ford Thailand Manufacturing and AutoAlliance Thailand plants.

== Products ==
=== Current production ===
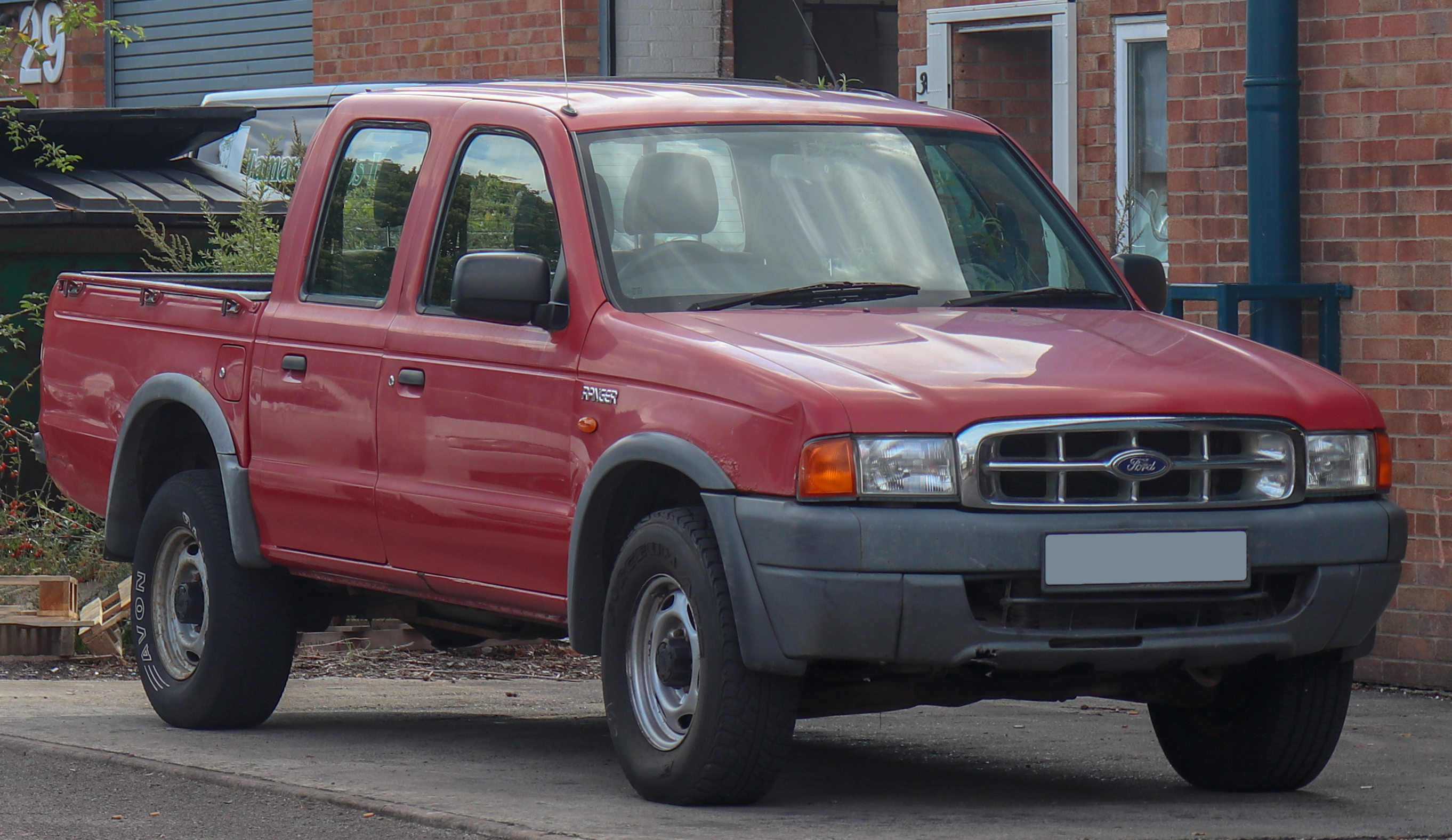
1998 Ford Ranger

==== AutoAlliance Thailand ====
- Ford Ranger (1998–present)
- Ford Everest (2003–present)
- Mazda2 (2009–present)
- Mazda3 (2010–present)
- Mazda CX-3 (2015–present)
- Mazda CX-30 (2019–present)

==== Ford Thailand Manufacturing ====
- Ford Ranger (2016–present)

=== Former production ===
==== AutoAlliance Thailand ====
- Mazda B-Series (1998–2006)
- Ford Laser (1999–2002)
- Mazda 323 Protégé (1999–2002)
- Ford Fiesta (2010–2012)
- Mazda BT-50 (2006–2020)

==== Ford Thailand Manufacturing ====
- Ford Fiesta (2012–2018)
- Ford EcoSport (2014–2018)
- Ford Focus (2012–2018)
