= Automotive industry in Thailand =

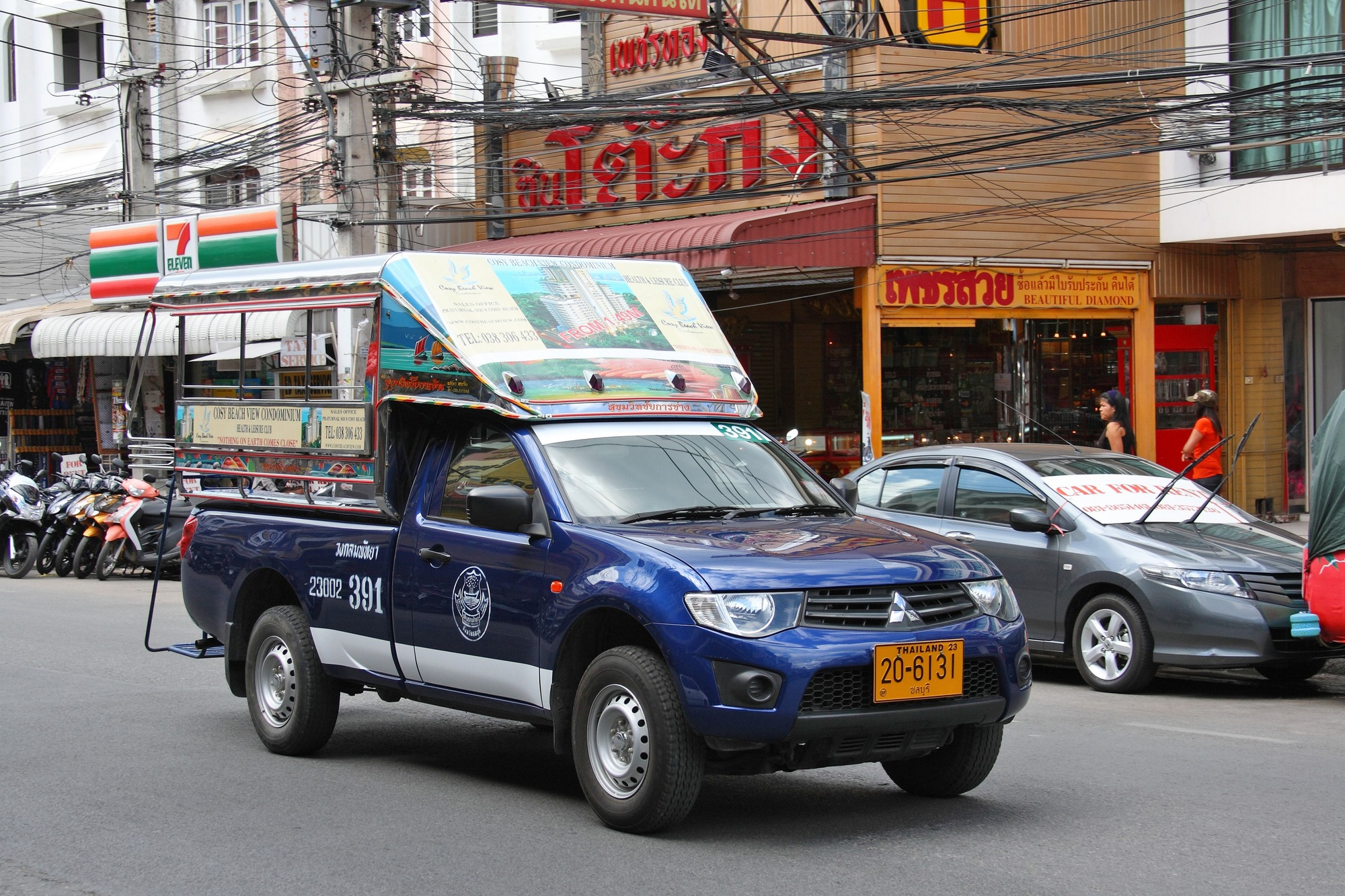
A locally-built Mitsubishi L200 as a songthaew in Pattaya

As of 2019, the automotive industry in Thailand is the largest in Southeast Asia and the 10th largest in the world. The Thai industry has an annual output of more than two million vehicles (passenger cars and pickup trucks), more than countries such as Belgium, Canada, the United Kingdom, Italy, Czech Republic and Turkey.

Most of the vehicles built in Thailand are developed and licensed by foreign producers, mainly Japanese, American and Chinese but with several other brands as well for CKD production, notably BMW and Mercedes. The Thai car industry takes advantage of the ASEAN Free Trade Area (AFTA) to find a market for many of its products. Thailand is one of the world's biggest markets for pickup trucks with over 50 percent market share for one-ton trucks.

== History ==
The first car imported to Thailand was brought by the royal family around 1900. Since then, Thailand has proceeded to gradually develop a viable industry. Compared to the import substitution efforts of other Southeast Asian nations, Thailand's government has generally allowed a larger role in guiding development to alliances of manufacturers themselves.

Many other countries have practiced a centralized approach, while some (like the Philippines) resorted to clientelism and favoritism. This is not to say that corruption has been entirely absent, with car manufacturing companies being involved in the Suvarnabhumi scandal, for instance. Several political families are also of prominence in manufacturing, often benefiting from insider knowledge and the occasional political privilege. Thailand also provided efficient governmental incentives and support for the lesser component manufacturers, enabling them to develop on pace with the multinationals.

=== Early days ===
The history of the Thai automotive industry began in 1960, when the Thai government set up an import substitution policy to boost local industry. In 1961, the first resulting company, the "Anglo-Thai Motor Company" (a joint venture between Ford of Britain and the Thai Motor Industry Co., Ford's existing importer), began local assembly. The market was very small, with only 3,232 passenger cars sold and a mere 525 vehicles (310 cars, 215 trucks) assembled in Thailand in 1961. Nonetheless, new manufacturers quickly appeared, like FSO and Fiat's "Karnasuta General Assembly Co." and a joint venture between Siam Motors and Nissan.

By 1970, local assembly had increased to 10,667. After ten years of these early efforts at building local industry, the share of Thai-assembled cars was still about half of the market in 1971. A policy review in 1969 found that the tax incentives, rather than lowering the trade deficit, had actually served to increase it. An Automobile Development Committee (ADC) was set up together with manufacturers to try to remedy these problems.

=== Local content promotion ===
Beginning in 1971, the government (along with private organizations representing the automotive industry) began an effort to increase the localization effort as a result of an ever increasing trade deficit. Many new parts manufacturers and assemblers had sprouted, but a proliferation of models and versions hindered economies of scale. As a reaction, the Thai government increased tariffs on completely built-up (CBU) vehicles and began a graduated increase in the local parts content regulations (up to 25 percent in 1975). A moratorium on new assemblers was also implemented, as were limits on the number of models offered. As manufacturers quickly began circumventing the model limits, these rules were abandoned before they could have any real effect.!

This still wasn't enough for locally assembled cars to compete with imports. The trade deficit in vehicles increased more than sixfold between 1972 and 1977, and plants were running at around a sixth of capacity. After having increased tariffs on CBU cars to 150 percent, imports of CBUs were banned in 1978. Local parts requirements were scheduled to increase to 50 percent by 1983 (although this was kept at 45 percent after pressures from manufacturers and the Japanese Chamber of Commerce).

The local parts requirement did force out several smaller companies such as Dodge, Hillman, Holden, and Simca. Gradually, the manufacture of simple parts such as brakes, radiators, engine parts, glass, and small body parts began to increase meaningfully. After the withdrawal of GM, Ford, and Fiat in the late-1970s, the market also became somewhat more efficient. In 1985, CBU imports with engines over 2.3 litres (140 cu in) were once again permitted, albeit with a 300 percent import duty.

The 1985 Plaza Accord meant more Japanese direct investment in Thailand, and as the economy began booming the last years of the 1980s saw strong growth. In 1987 a benchmark was reached when Mitsubishi Thailand became the first producer to export Thai-built vehicles, a shipment of 488 passenger cars and 40 buses sent to Canada.

=== Liberalization and regional integration ===
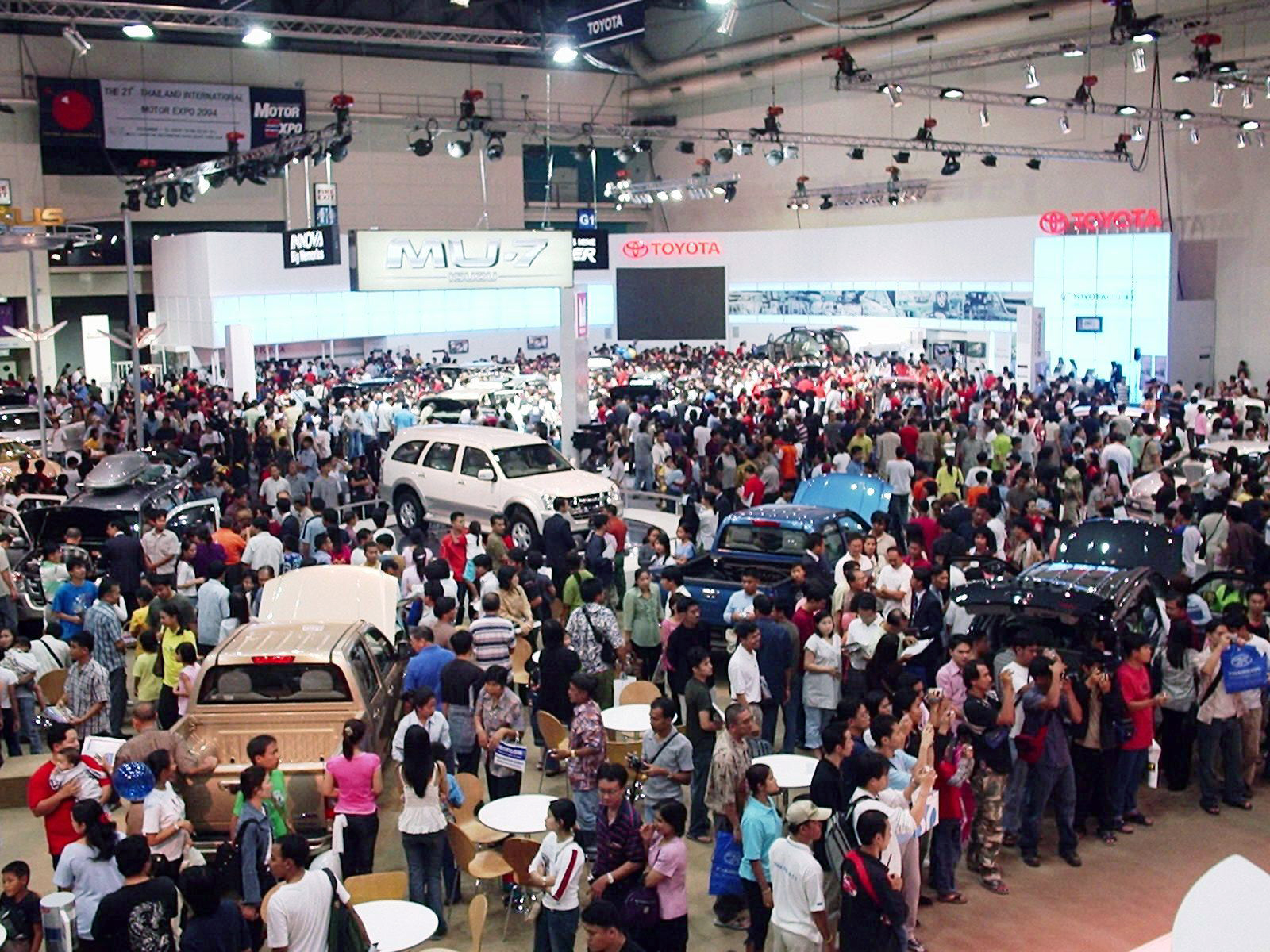
The 2004 Thailand International Motor Expo

In 1991, market restrictions were eased and the market began to grow at a rapid rate due to the resulting lower prices. The ban on imports of cars under 2.3 litres was dropped in 1991, and tariffs were lightened. As a result, a flood of South Korean imports flooded the market. The Japanese manufacturers responded by cutting costs and by introducing market specific, low-priced cars like the Honda City and the Toyota Soluna. In the period from 1992 to 1996, average growth was 12 percent. 1996's results were only exceeded in 2004. This collapsed entirely following the Asian crisis; 1998's sales results (passenger and commercial vehicles) were less than a quarter of what they had been in the record year 1996.

The investment in the pre-crash period led to serious problems of over-capacity which were to last long into the succeeding decade. Capacity was now 1.2 million cars and trucks, in a market which rarely reached 700,000 in sales. The manufacturers responded by increasing export efforts, with 1998 (while a dark year overall) marking the first time that Thailand became a net exporter of cars.

The market had also been helped by the "brand to brand complement" scheme (BBC), instituted in 1992. This allowed component manufacturers in Malaysia and Thailand to freely trade certain parts in order to help them reach economies of scale. The ASEAN Industrial Cooperation Scheme (AICO) helped further the integration of car manufacturers in the region. As a result of the financial crisis, duties on fully built-up vehicles were increased from 42/68.5 percent (with a 2.4-litre threshold for the lower rate) to a flat rate of 80 percent in November 1997. Thai suppliers had also reached a higher level in the nineties, now offering precision injection-molded pieces and with an eye to producing ever more sophisticated products in the future.

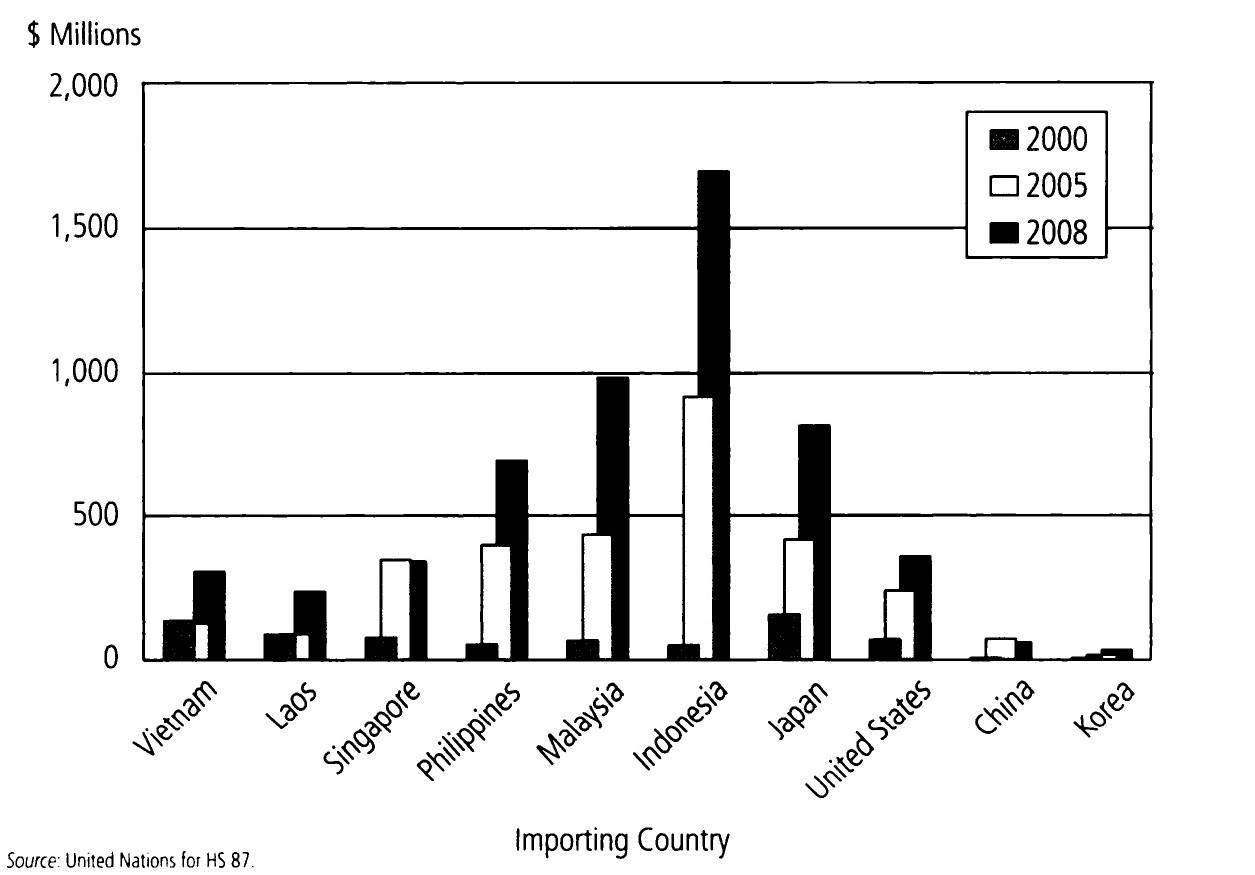
Export of automobiles and parts from Thailand in 2000, 2005, and 2008

After having come to the aid of local manufacturers after the 1997 crash, the Thai government further stimulated trade and regional cooperation by dropping the local parts requirements on 1 January 2003. Further governmental efforts included bilateral trade agreements in the early-2000s, most notably with Australia, China, and India. The Thai automotive industry also endeavoured to concentrate its growth in certain "cluster" areas, mainly in eastern Bangkok but also in Rayong, Chachoengsao, Chonburi (eastern Thailand), and in the centrally located city of Ayutthaya. Thailand's Board of Industries has often referred to Thailand as the "Detroit of the East", and Thailand is indeed by a large margin the largest vehicle manufacturer in the ASEAN area. Still, the decisions that control most vehicle manufacturing in Thailand are made in Tokyo and Detroit rather than in Thailand, as nearly all production is carried out by subsidiaries of foreign conglomerates.

Thailand has an 80% tariff rate on imports sourced from outside ASEAN.

In the midst of COVID-19 pandemic in 2020, United Nations Industrial Development Organization released a report in June 2020 reported that 90% or more of firms expect revenue loss of more than 50% compared to last year. Automotive sectors had a drop in manufacturing performance index (MPI) in April 2020, about 82% year on year, showing the lowest production since 1987.

== Production ==
Car production in Thailand is forecasted to drop 37% to 1.33 million units in 2020, and possibly as much as 50% to one million vehicles if the coronavirus pandemic persists, according to the Federation of Thai Industries (FTI). Of the 1.33 million vehicles projected to be produced in 2020, 665,000 units are for export and 665,000 for the domestic market.

== Domestic sales ==
Cheaper and simpler cars are naturally preferred, as is the case for most markets at the same developmental stage as Thailand. Remarkable is the popularity of pickup trucks, holding a share of over half the market. This makes Thailand the world's second biggest market for such vehicles, after the United States. Their popularity has been explained as a result of government tax policies as well as a need for multi-purpose vehicles. A downside is that pickups use diesel fuel, now blamed in part for Bangkok's dangerous levels of air pollution. Thailand produced about 1.98 million vehicles in 2017, with 871,650 sold domestically (up 13 percent year-on-year) and the remainder exported, accounting for about US$28 billion in foreign revenues, or 12 percent of the country's total exports of US$236 billion. One-ton pickup trucks accounted for nearly 50 percent of domestic sales in 2017, and an equal percentage of exports. One result is significant diesel particle pollution.

Many manufacturers (Ford, Isuzu, Mazda, Mitsubishi) have chosen to localize their global bases for pickup manufacturing in Thailand, often exporting to Europe, Japan, and much of the rest of the world. These one-ton trucks are not exported to North America, where larger trucks are preferred and a 25 percent import duty is imposed. In 2005, Thailand surpassed the United States and became the world's largest manufacturer of one-ton pickups, and by 2007 were second in the world (again behind the US) in both production and export of pickup trucks overall.

The Federation of Thai Industries (FTI) forecasts domestic sales of 850,000 vehicles in 2017, up 11 percent over 2016. Thailand introduced tax incentives in 2007 for the local production of eco-cars, small-engine vehicles with low fuel consumption that meet European carbon emissions standards. The program attracted nine multinational auto producers, including leading Japanese producers such as Toyota, Honda, Nissan, Mitsubishi and Suzuki. All were required to produce 100,000 eco-cars each over a five-year time frame to qualify for tax incentives. The program proved successful. A newer tax imposed in 2016 is based on carbon dioxide emissions, E85-gasohol compatibility, and fuel efficiency, rather than engine size. The restructuring encourages production of vehicles compatible with E85 and eco-cars. The new tax regime means passenger cars with CO^{2} emissions of less than 150 grammes per kilometre are subject to a 30 percent excise tax, those with 150-200g/km draw a 35 percent rate and more than 200g/km is charged 40 percent. Cars with E85-gasohol compatibility are subject to less than a five percent excise tax for each carbon emission level. Eco-cars are required to emit less than 100g/km, lowering their tax rate to 12-14 percent from 17 percent. The segments most affected are large pickups, passenger cars, pickup passenger vehicles (PPVs), and sport utility vehicles (SUVs). In anticipation of the new tax, sales of PPVs rose by 42 percent in 2015 to 69,063 vehicles and SUVs by 37 percent to 56,952.

While many Western brands are present, as well as certain others, Japanese brands have long had a dominant position in Thailand. In 1978 and 1982, for instance, Japanese brands achieved 91 and 90 percent shares. In 2006, they still had an 88.5 percent share, in spite of the late entries of Ford, General Motors, Volkswagen, and BMW.

Light and medium trucks, as well as microvans, also provide the basis for the ubiquitous songthaew, (shared taxis), which serve local transport needs throughout Thailand.

=== Electric vehicles ===
The Thai Energy Ministry's Energy Planning and Policy Office has forecast that purchases of electric vehicles (EV) in Thailand will rise from 9,000 in 2018 to 406,000 in 2028 and 1.2 million in 2036 (with 690 charging stations). The Thai government provides incentives in the form of low import tariffs for importers and tax exemptions for manufacturers, but few incentives for consumers. Three HEV models have been locally assembled since 2009: the Toyota Camry, Honda Accord and Nissan X-Trail. Mercedes-Benz BlueTEC hybrid engines were assembled in Thailand in 2013 before upgrading to a PHEV platform in 2016. BMW began PHEV assembly in Thailand in 2016. Toyota assembles 7,000 HEVs a year in Thailand and makes 70,000 EV batteries.

The Electric Vehicle Association of Thailand (EVAT) views Thailand's EV take-up rate as too slow. As of 2017, Land Transport Department data show there are 102,408 hybrid-electric vehicles (HEV) and plug-in hybrid electric vehicles (PHEV) in Thailand along with 1,394 battery-electric vehicles (BEV). EVAT says that as of 31 December 2019 there were 2,854 electric vehicle (EV) registrations, including 1,572 new cars, up 380% over 2018 when only 325 vehicles were registered. Hybrid electric vehicles (HEV) and plug-in hybrid electric vehicles (PHEV) reached a total of 153,184 vehicles.

=== BMW ===
The BMW Group Manufacturing Thailand plant was built in 2000 with a total investment of more than 2.6 billion baht, occupying a space of approximately 75,000 square meters. BMW reported that its Rayong plant exported 9,449 completely built-up units in 2016, mainly to China. It was the first year of shipments from its Thailand facility.

In 2016 BMW Group Thailand sold 7,923 BMW (7,010) and Mini (913) automobiles in-country, a decrease of 9.6 percent from 2015 and its first dip in nine years. BMW Motorrad Thailand's sales rose by 42.1 percent to 1,819 deliveries in 2016. The head of BMW Motorrad Thailand said that the Thai market for big motorbikes (greater than 500 cc) rose by seven percent in 2016, to 18,500 units. BMW Thailand shipped 2,215 big bikes to China, Indonesia, and the Philippines in 2016, up from 1,000 in 2015.

=== Daihatsu ===
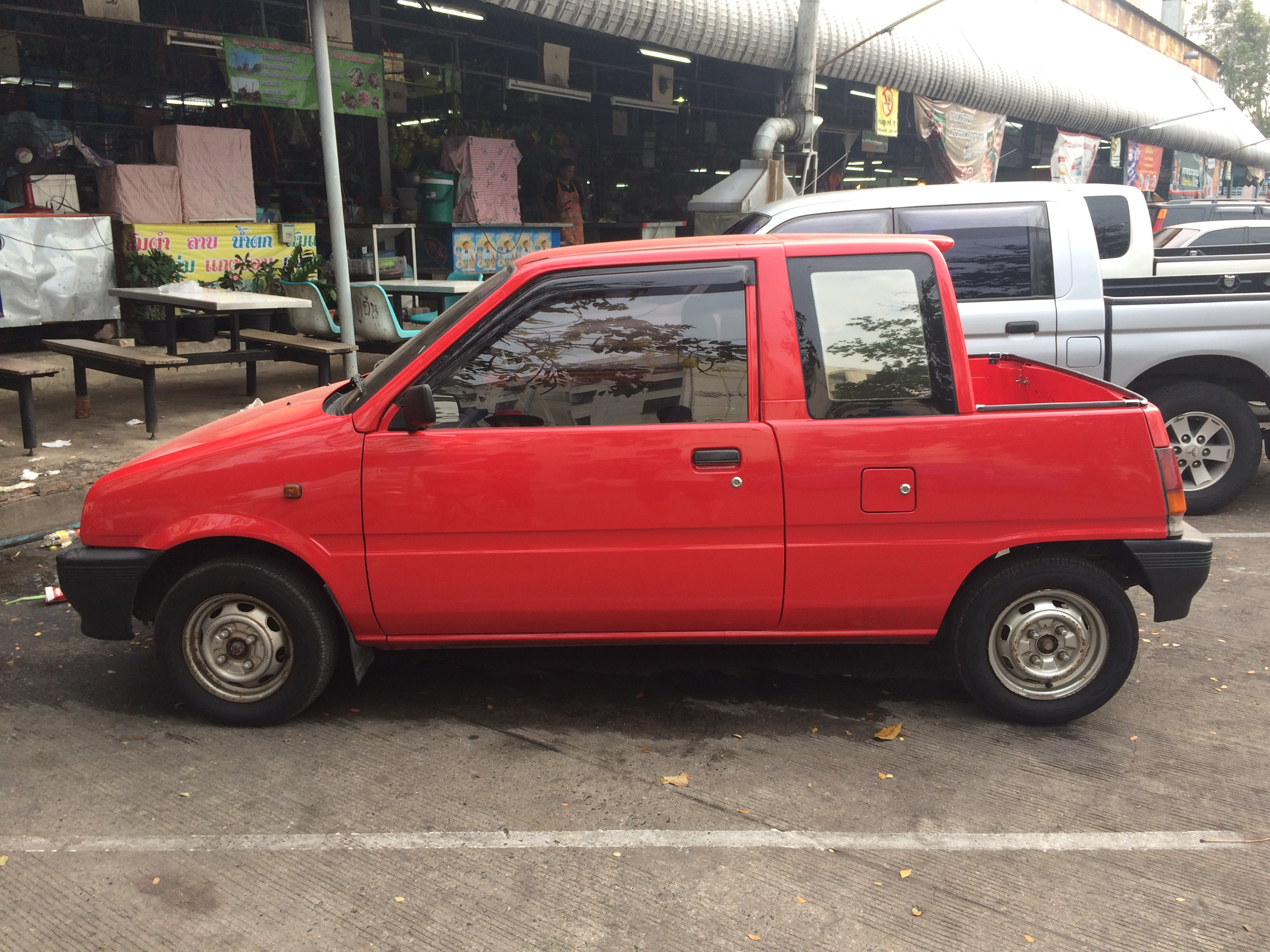
The Daihatsu Mira Pickup was only built (and sold) in Thailand

Daihatsu in Thailand were built by Bangchan Motors, a company which has also assembled Opels and Hondas. Originally only small trucks Hijets) were manufactured, but by 1980 the Charade was also available. Some market specific models of the Mira, most notably a pickup version, were developed, but Daihatsu withdrew from Thailand subsequent to the 1997 financial crisis. Sales had dropped from 4,000 in 1995 to a mere 160 in 1997, and in March 1998 Daihatsu stopped selling cars in Thailand.

Currently, Daihatsu is present in Thailand as Toyota Daihatsu Engineering & Manufacturing Co., Ltd. It is Toyota's regional headquarters for engineering and manufacturing functions.

=== Ford ===
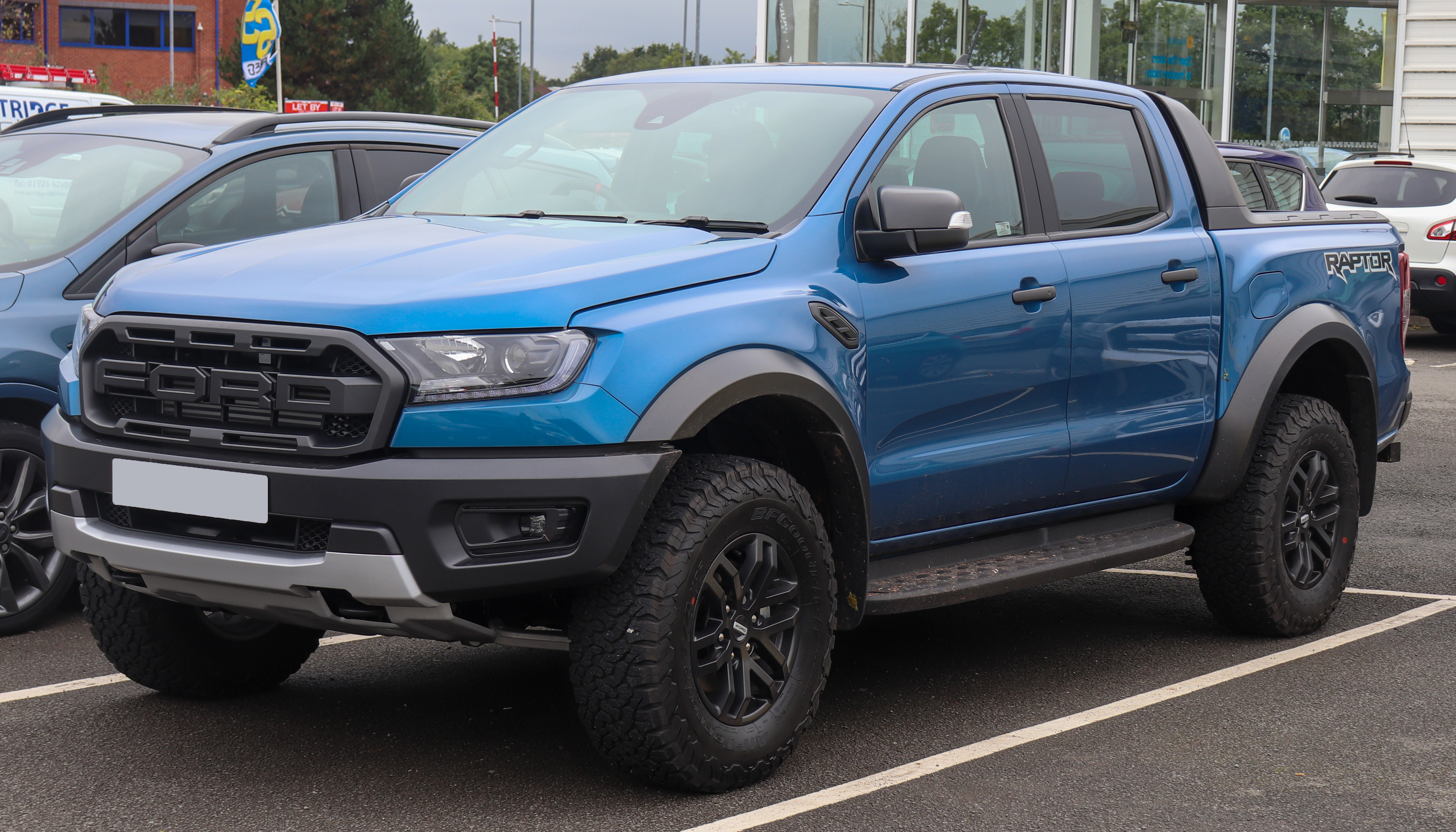
Thailand is a major global production base for the Ranger model.

Thai Motor Co. (founded in 1947 to import Fords) began assembling British Ford cars in 1961, in a joint venture with Anglo-Thai Motor. The firm was renamed Ford Thailand in 1973, although Ford withdrew in 1976. Various crises and tougher restrictions on assemblers had made the business climate inhospitable. Ford maintained a presence in the 1980s and 1990s through assembly by Sukosol and Mazda Motor. In 1995 Ford and Mazda opened AutoAlliance Thailand (AAT), a joint venture which began producing Mazda B-Series-based pickup trucks in May 1998. Sold as the Ford Ranger an SUV version of it, called the Ford Everest, was developed locally. It was first shown at the March 2003 Bangkok Motor Show. From 2010 to 2018, it is the exclusive production site of the sixth generation of the Ford Fiesta for major Asian markets (except for China and India). The plant also started manufacturing Ford Ranger in 2016.

=== General Motors ===
Having had an early presence in Thailand since the creation of Bangchan Motors in 1970, General Motors (GM) withdrew in the late-1970s as the Vietnam War, Thai domestic stability, and the energy crisis all threatened its business. After having left in 1977, General Motors Thailand (GMT) returned in 2000, subsequent to the elimination of local content requirements. They then offered a combination of Opels, Daewoos, and Holdens with Chevrolet badging.

General Motors placed the production of the Chevrolet Zafira (Opel) in Thailand, originally with the intention of supplying the local ASEAN markets only. After the 1997 Asian financial crisis and resulting market collapse this aim had to be adjusted, and by 2002 90 percent of the production of General Motors' Rayong plant was being exported, as far away as Europe and Chile. The Zafira also marked a notable first for the Thai car industry, when it became the first finished car to be exported to Japan (as the Subaru Traviq). The Zafira was built in Thailand from May 2000 until 2005. Various Daewoo products and Isuzu pickup trucks are also provided with Chevrolet badging, as was the Holden Commodore ("Chevrolet Lumina"). GMT also assembled the Alfa Romeo 156 in 2002–2004, a result of Fiat and GM's strategic alliance.

In 2020, GM announced it would stop selling Chevrolet vehicles in Thailand and would sell its Rayong plant by the end of the year.

=== Honda ===
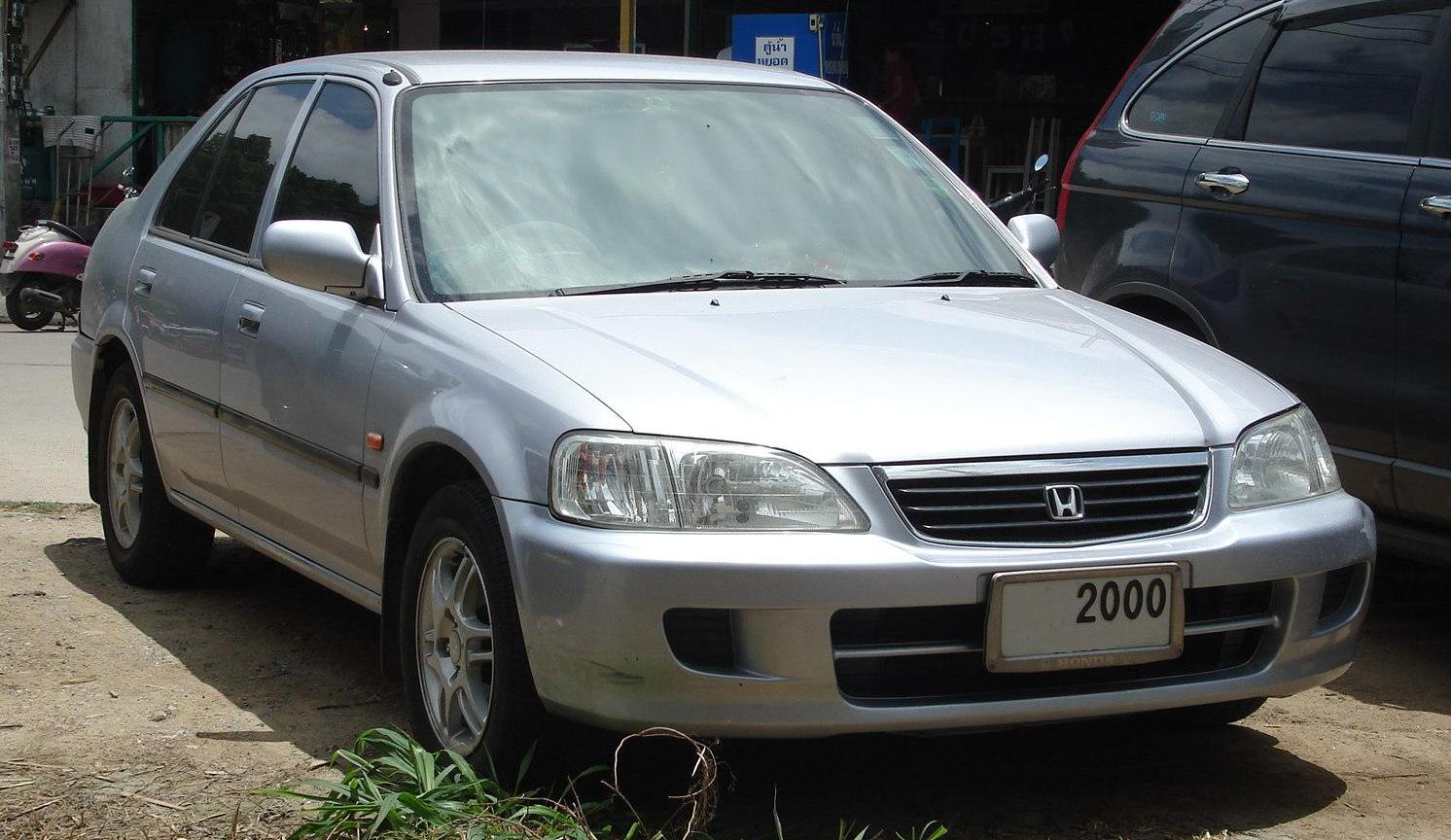
The Honda City has been a key product for Honda Thailand since its introduction.

Honda only began assembling cars in Thailand in 1984, by a company called Bangchan General Assembly. Bangchan continued to do so under license until 2000, even though Honda established their own parallel production by Honda Cars Manufacturing Thailand in 1992. This company, with 91.4 percent Honda ownership, then changed its name to Honda Automobile (Thailand) Co., Ltd in 2000. The most famous model of Honda Thailand is the 1996 City, a small sedan developed especially for the ASEAN markets and not intended for sale in Japan. Nonetheless, the second generation City (2002) has been exported to Japan as the Honda Fit Aria since its introduction. Currently, Honda has two factories at Rojana Industrial Estate, Phra Nakhon Si Ayutthaya And Rojana Industrial Park, Prachinburi (Phase 1), producing car for both domestic sales and export to several countries across the world.

Domestically, Honda sold 112,178 vehicles in 2015, up 5.3 percent. Honda expects to sell approximately 110,000 vehicles in Thailand in 2016. It achieved the top market share in passenger cars at 31.5 percent, with Toyota coming in second at 29.6 percent, based on combined sales of 356,052 vehicles. Honda held a 14 percent market share in the country's overall car market, trailing Toyota (33 percent) and Isuzu (18 percent).

"The new excise tax, which takes effect this year, has absorbed future car demand for roughly 15,000 vehicles in last year's fourth quarter," said COO Pitak Pruittisarikorn. "So this year it's possible for the [total Thai] market to stay below 765,000 vehicles."

=== Isuzu ===
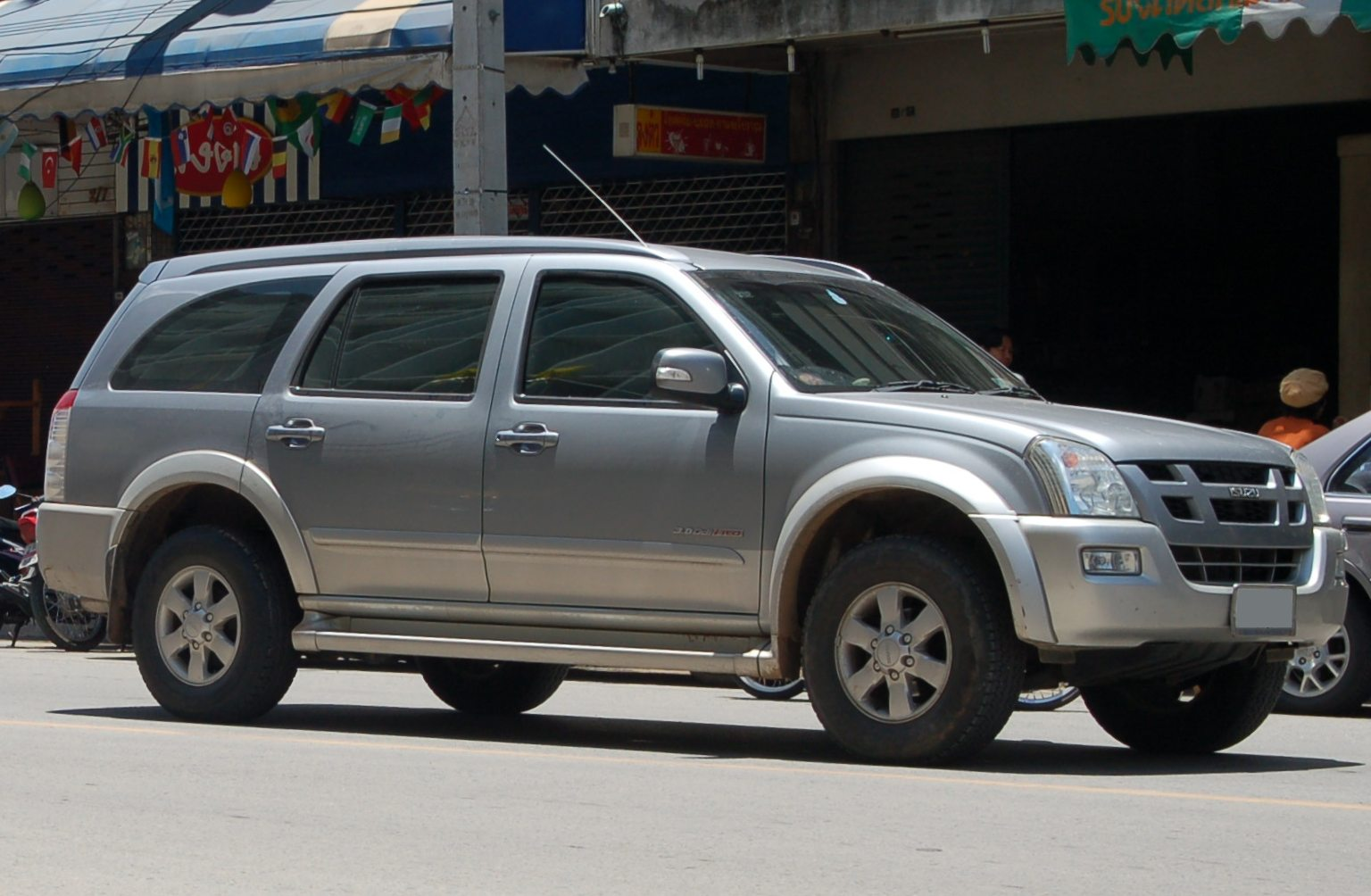
Isuzu MU-7 SUV

Isuzu have been built in Thailand since 1963 by the Isuzu Assembling Plant. The company became "Isuzu Motors Co. (Thailand)" in 1966, and built their first pickup trucks in 1974. The Thai-only Isuzu Vega SUV was built from 1998 until 2002. The larger and more rounded MU-7 SUV can seat six or seven and appeared in November 2004.

In 2019, Isuzu sold 168,215 vehicles in Thailand, down 5.4%. The overall market saw 1,007,552 units sold, down 3.3%. Isuzu's market share was 16.7% in 2019, second after Toyota, down 0.4%. Isuzu sold 143,693 pickups in 2019, down 3.9%, while it sold 9,477 pickup passenger vehicles, down 24.5%. The remaining sales in 2019 were big trucks with 15,045 units sold, a 4.4% drop. Isuzu exported 142,223 units from Thailand to overseas markets in 2019, a 16.1% drop from 2018.

=== Mazda ===
The first Mazda assembled in Thailand were three-wheeled commercial vehicles, in 1950. In 1974 "Sukosol and Mazda Motor Industry" was founded, opening Mazda's first knock-down assembly plant in 1975. In 1998 the AutoAlliance Thailand (AAT, formed in 1995) automobile assembly plant was opened, a joint venture between Ford Motor Company and Mazda Motor Corporation in Rayong Province, Thailand. AAT builds compact pickup trucks and SUVs primarily for the Southeast Asian market, with exports to other developing markets and Europe as well. The Mazda 323 Protégé was produced between January 2000 and 2002, but was replaced with imports from the Philippines as a result of market liberalizations.

=== Mercedes-Benz ===
Mercedes-Benz first gained a toehold in Thailand in 1960, when they established a plant for the manufacture of utility vehicles (operational in 1961). Passenger car production commenced in 1979, soon after the government's ban on CBU imports. Mercedes are built by the Thonburi Automotive Assembly Plant Company. In more recent years, much of the Mercedes-Benz line has been built here, from the A-class to the C, E, and S-classes.

In September 2015 GLA and CLA models are being assembled as semi knocked-down (SKD) vehicles at Thonburi Automotive Assembly Plant Co in Samut Prakan Province.

=== MG ===
SAIC Motor-CP, a joint venture of Charoen Pokphand Group and Shanghai Automotive Industry Corporation (SAIC) built a nine billion baht factory in the Hemaraj Eastern Seaboard Industrial Estate in Rayong, operational in June 2014. It has a production capacity of 50,000 vehicles. In November 2015 SAIC Motor-CP purchased 438 rai in Chonburi Province in order to build a second, 700,000 m^{2} facility at an estimated cost of 30-40 billion baht. MG-Thailand had sales of 8,319 vehicles in 2016, up 120 percent.

=== Mine Mobility ===
Energy Absolute Public Company Limited or EA, a Thai listed company, takes another big step to move up from its renewable energy business, unveiling three prototype of Full EVs which were designed and developed by its own R&D team. The Thai R&D team has been working since 2017 until achieved a certain step before setting up a new subsidiary company named Mine Mobility Research Co., Ltd. by the end of 2017 to fully develop electrical vehicle. The new company is going to launch commercial production of "MINE Mobility" the first Thai EV in the future to fulfill the need of Thai people.

=== Mitsubishi ===
Mitsubishi Motors has had a presence in Thailand since 1961. Mitsubishi Motors (Thailand) (MMTh) is headquartered in Pathumthani, just north of Bangkok. Their flagship product is the Mitsubishi Triton (L200 in many markets) pickup truck, which is built exclusively in Laem Chabang and is exported to more than 140 global markets. The sixth generation of the Mitsubishi Mirage is also produced exclusively at the Laem Chabang plant. Mitsubishi had originally made Thailand their global hub for pickup production in 1995, after having become Thailand's first vehicle exporter in 1988. This focus on global exports was of considerable aid to MMTh the tight years after the Asian financial crisis, when the local markets collapsed. The company targeted five million production units by 2018 which it has achieved.

Mitsubishi Motors Thailand exported 332,700 vehicles in 2019, a 3.9% drop. Mitsubishi posted local sales in 2019 of 88,244 units, up 4.4%, overcoming a Thai car market that fell 3.3% to 1,007,552 units sold in 2019.

=== Nissan ===
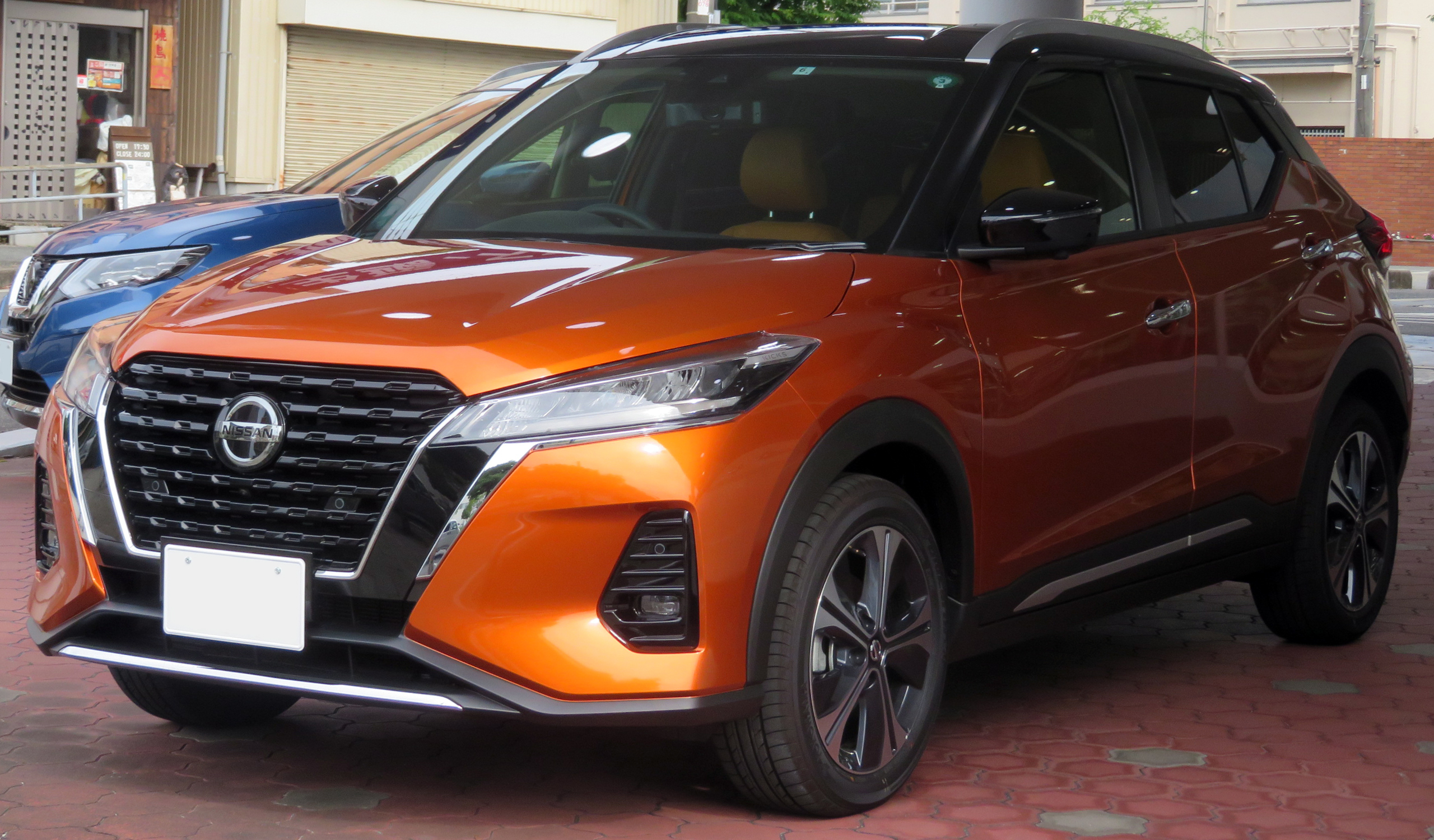
Nissan Motor (Thailand) exported the Kicks e-Power to Japan.

Nissan was the first Japanese producer to build a plant in Thailand, in a 1962 joint venture with Siam Motors, founded by Dr. Thaworn Phornprapha. "Siam Motors & Nissan Co., Ltd." received a sister company called "Siam Nissan Automobile Co., Ltd." in 1977, which only built pickup trucks. Today, Nissan manufactures various cars and the D21/Navara pickup truck in Thailand, also for export to various markets. A branch called "Prince Motor Thailand" also operated, until February 1986. In addition to Nissan products, Siam Automotive also assembled Fiats for the local market until 1986.

One local specialty is the Nissan NV, a tiny pickup truck based on the Y10 Nissan AD Van. This was also later developed into a double cab, four-seater model. In April 2009, the company's name was changed to Nissan Motor (Thailand).

=== Tata ===
Thonburi Automotive Assembly Plant Company, which builds Mercedes-Benz vehicles in Thailand, has a 30 percent stake in a joint venture producing Indian Tata Motors automobiles since 2007.

=== Thai Rung ===
The only Thai automobile manufacturer is Thai Rung, also known as TR, manufactured by Thai Rung Union Car Public Co. Ltd. (TRU). The company was established in 1967 in Bangkok, Thailand. The original name was Thai Rung Engineering Co. Ltd., which was changed to Thai Rung Union Car Co. Ltd. in 1973. TRU was first listed on the Stock Exchange of Thailand (SET) in 1994. TRU's business ranges from product design and development, automotive parts manufacturing, industrial equipment manufacturing, car assembly lines, to financial business.

Some discontinued TR vans were powered by Land Rover engine in combination with Thai-developed body design and platform. Modern TR cars are based on small or medium trucks, developed into SUV or seven-seat multi-purpose vehicles by Thai Rung themselves. The 2009 models were the TR Adventure (based on the Isuzu D-Max) and TR Allroader (based on the Thai-version Chevrolet Colorado).

=== Toyota ===
Toyota Motor Thailand Co. (TMT) was set up in 1962 and began producing the Toyota Publica and Tiara cars, and the Stout, Dyna, and DA trucks in 1964. In June 1968, Toyota's Thai operations became the first plant outside of Japan to assemble the Corolla. In 1979 Toyota began making pressed body parts in Thailand, and in 1989 they began manufacturing engines locally.

In 1996, in response to stiff competition from imported South Korean cars, Toyota introduced the Tercel-based Toyota Soluna in Thailand. The Soluna has also been exported to other ASEAN countries. After the 1997 Asian financial crisis, the ASEAN markets contracted severely and TMT changed their focus to exports. Nevertheless, they remain mostly an import-substitution operation and their main export market beyond Southeast Asia is Oceania. In 2005, Toyota established a research and development center in Thailand. Toyota currently builds a wide range of cars in Thailand, from the Yaris to the Fortuner SUV.

Thailand saw 1,007,552 new vehicles registered in 2019, a year-on-year decline of 3.3%. Toyota increased its Thai market share in 2019 to 33%, a 2.8% increase.

=== Vera ===
Thailand's first electric car brand debuted amid skepticism from an industry expert about its commercial viability. Vera Automotive was founded on 7 October 2015 by five Thai engineers from King Mongkut's Institute of Technology Ladkrabang (KMITL).

=== Volvo ===
Volvo has a long-standing Thai presence through the (entirely owned by Volvo) Thai Swedish Assembly Co, Ltd., which was formed in 1976. Their large, more expensive cars occupy a prestige position in the market. Following the 1991 easing of import tariffs, cars of over 2,300 cc received an import duty of 100 percent while those with smaller engines were only taxed at 60 percent. Volvo, mainly using an engine of 2,316 cc, found themselves disadvantaged against Mercedes-Benz and after some lobbying managed to have this limit raised to 2,400 cc. In addition to various Volvo cars (and the XC90 SUV), Thai Swedish Assembly also built the Land Rover Freelander from 2001 until 2005.

=== Yontrakit Motors ===
Yontrakit is an assembler which began producing vehicles in 1972. They have built a number of different brands but are currently mainly producing Peugeot, Citroën and Volkswagen cars. Volkswagen commenced local assembly in 1999.

== Tax structure ==
The excise tax structure for automobiles in Thailand is determined by several variables, including body style, carbon dioxide output, engine displacement, ethanol fuel compatibility and the inclusion of eco-friendly technology. The current excise tax structure was imposed since 2016.

Passenger cars structure
Vehicle type	CO_{2} output	Excise tax rate		
Vehicle type	CO_{2} output	E10/E20	E85/natural gas	Hybrid
Passenger car	<100 g/km	refer to Eco Car		10%
Passenger car	100–150 g/km	30%	25%	20%
Passenger car	151–200 g/km	35%	30%	25%
Passenger car	>200 g/km	40%	35%	30%
Passenger car	Engine displacement >3,000 cc (183.1 cu in)	50%		
Pickup trucks and pickup-based SUV structure
Vehicle type		CO_{2} output		Engine displacement >3,250 cc (198.3 cu in)
Vehicle type		≤200 g/km	>200 g/km	Engine displacement >3,250 cc (198.3 cu in)
Single cabin		3%	5%	50%
Space cabin		5%	7%	50%
Double cabin		12%	15%	50%
Pickup-based SUV		25%	30%	50%

== Incentives ==
The Thai government has handed tax incentives to several automotive segments, mainly to eco-friendly cars and pickup trucks.

=== Eco Car ===
The Eco Car program was launched by the government in 2007 with its qualifying cars entered production starting from 2010. The program promotes compact fuel-efficient internal combustion cars to be built in the country as opposed to the popular pickup trucks. The Board of Investment of Thailand claimed the first phase had attracted investment of 28.8 billion baht. The second phase of the program was introduced in 2014, with the deadline set by the end of 2019. By the end of 2014, the Board of Investment (BOI) had approved investment applications from ten automobile manufacturers under Phase 2 of the eco-car program.

For the second phase, eligible cars were charged 14% excise tax for petrol engine and 12% for diesel engine. Ford and General Motors had applied for the second phase Eco Car before withdrawing due to the shift of each global strategies. Volkswagen has also received an approval to produce cars under the second phase Eco Car following its plan to set up a manufacturing plant in the country, though later the German automaker cancelled its plans.

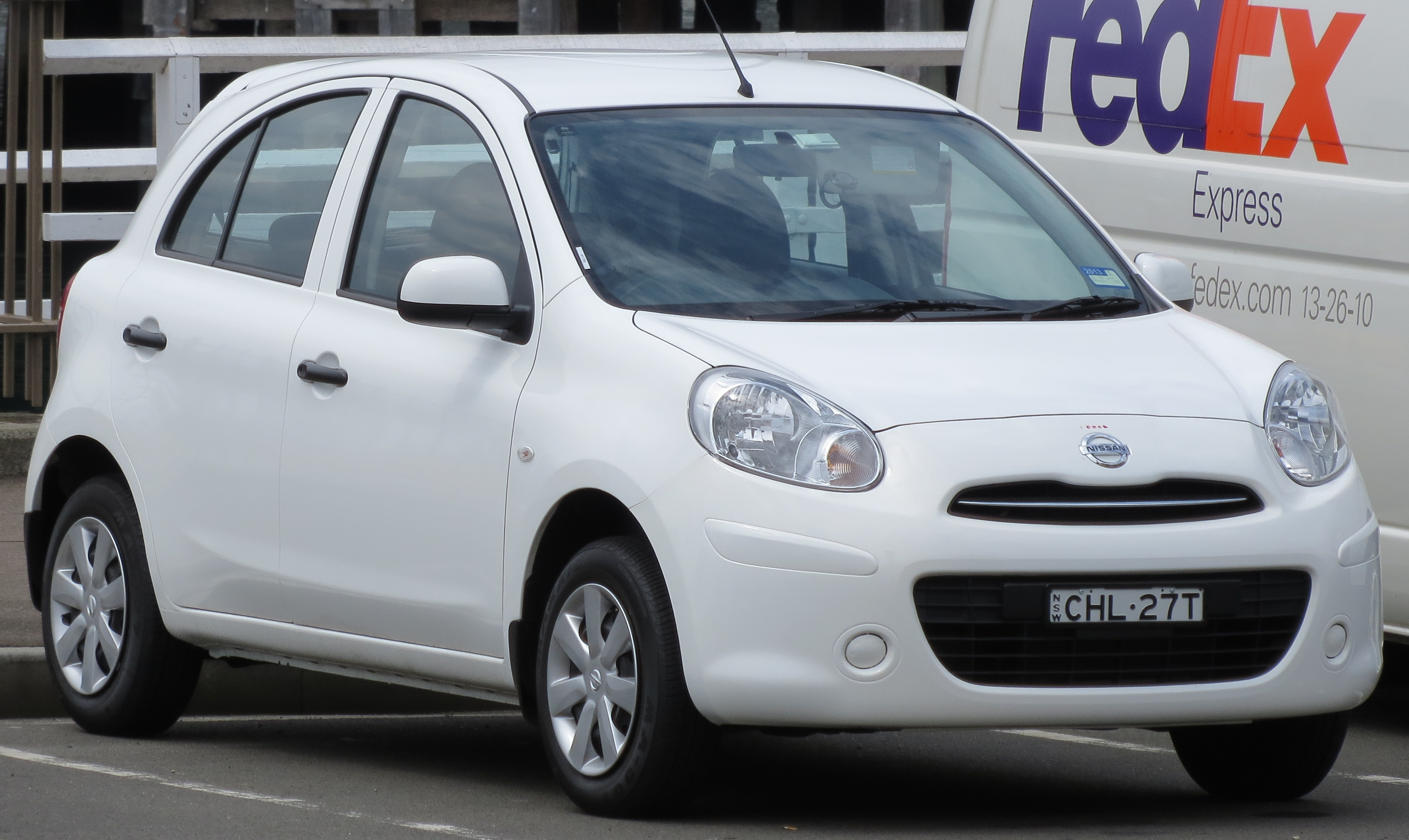
The Nissan March was the first vehicle launched under the Eco Car program.

==== Specification requirements ====
Specifications		Phase 1	Phase 2
Emissions standard		Euro 4	Euro 5
CO_{2} output		<120 g/km	<100 g/km
Fuel consumption		<5 L/100 km (>20 km/L)	<4.3 L/100 km (>23.25 km/L)
Impact standard		UN ECE R94, UN ECE 95	
Braking standard		-	UN ECE R13H
Safety features		-	ABS, ESC
Engine displacement	Petrol	<1,300 cc (79.3 cu in)	
Engine displacement	Diesel	<1,400 cc (85.4 cu in)	<1,500 cc (91.5 cu in)

=== Qualified cars ===
Phase 1
- Honda Brio (2011–2019)
- Honda Brio Amaze (2013–2019)
- Mitsubishi Attrage (2013–2019)
- Mitsubishi Mirage (2012–2019)
- Nissan Almera (2011–2019)
- Nissan March (2010–2019)
- Nissan Note (2017–2019)
- Suzuki Celerio (2014–2019)
- Suzuki Ciaz (2015–2019)
- Suzuki Swift (2012–2019)
- Toyota Yaris (2013–2019)
- Toyota Yaris Ativ (2017–2019)
Phase 2
- Honda City (2019–present)
- Mazda2 (1.3 petrol, 1.5 diesel) (2015–present)
- Mitsubishi Attrage (2019–present)
- Mitsubishi Mirage (2019–2025)
- Nissan Almera (2019–present)
- Nissan March (2019–2022)
- Nissan Note (2019–2022)
- Suzuki Celerio (2019–2024)
- Suzuki Ciaz (2020–2024)
- Suzuki Swift (2018–2024)
- Toyota Yaris (2019–present)
- Toyota Yaris Ativ (2019–present)

=== Pickup trucks ===
The pickup truck segment had been a traditionally strong market in Thailand due to the low excise tax imposed by the government compared to passenger cars. Currently, the excise tax for pickup trucks could be as low as 3 percent, depending on the emissions output and body style. As the result, most automakers including Toyota, Isuzu, Mitsubishi, Ford, Nissan, Mazda and Chevrolet manufactured pickup trucks for domestic sales and exports to most regions around the world.

== Automobiles currently manufactured in Thailand ==
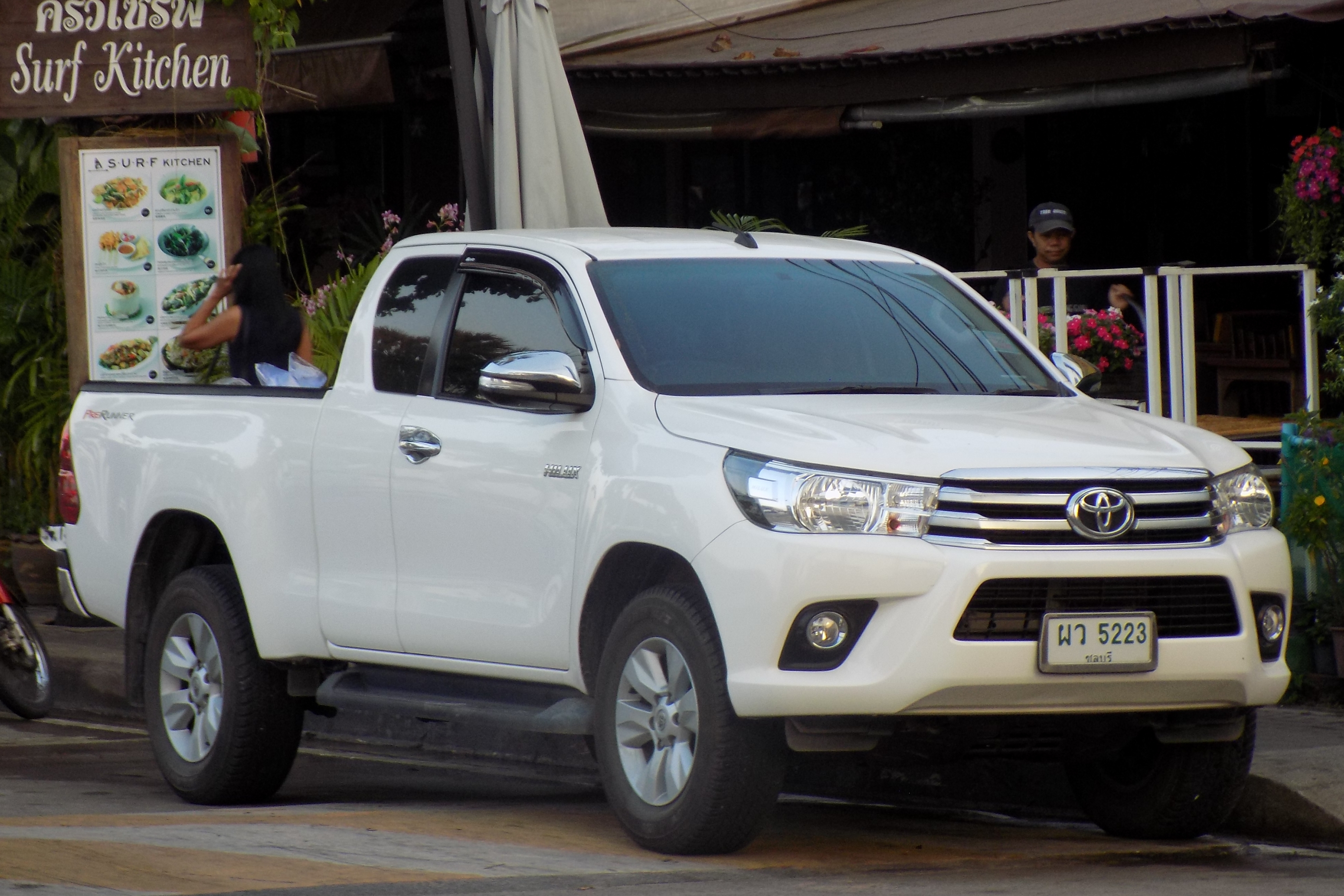
The Toyota Hilux is one of the best-selling vehicles in Thailand.

BMW: 2 Series Gran Coupé, 3 Series, 5 Series, 7 Series, X1, X3, X5, X6, X7

BYD: Atto 3, Dolphin, Seal 5 DM-i, Sealion 5 DM-i, Sealion 6 DM-i

Changan Nevo: Q05

Chery: V23

Deepal: S05

Ford: Everest, Ranger

GAC Aion: UT, V, Y Plus

GWM: Poer Sahar

Haval: H6, Jolion

Honda: Accord, Avancier, City, City Hatchback, Civic, CR-V, HR-V

Hyundai: Ioniq 5

Isuzu: D-Max, MU-X

Jaecoo: 5 EV, 6 EV

Lepas: L6 EV

Mazda: 2, 3, BT-50, CX-3, CX-30

Mercedes-Benz: A-Class, C-Class, E-Class, S-Class, CLA, CLE, EQS, EQS SUV, GLA, GLC, GLE, GLS

MG: 3, 4 EV, 5, Extender, HS, S5 EV, Urban, ZS

Mini: Countryman

Mitsubishi: Attrage, Pajero, Pajero Sport, Triton, Xforce, Xpander

Nissan: Almera, Kicks, Navara

Omoda: C5 EV

Ora: 5

Tank: 300, 500

Toyota: Camry, Corolla Altis, Corolla Cross, Fortuner, HiAce, Hilux, Hilux Champ, Land Cruiser FJ, Yaris Ativ, Yaris, Yaris Cross

== Historical sales ==
Top 10 best-selling models in Thailand (new passenger and commercial vehicles), 1990–2025 Source : BSCB Table indicators Pickup truck Crossover / SUV (J) Mini (A) / Small (B) Car Medium (C) / Large (D) Car X ^{E} Eco Car X ^{P} Pickup truck-based SUV
Year	Models and Ranking										Year
Year	1st	2nd	3rd	4th	5th	6th	7th	8th	9th	10th	Year
2025	Toyota HiLux	Toyota Yaris Ativ ^{E}	Isuzu D-Max	Toyota Yaris Cross ^{J}	Honda City	Honda HRV	not available				2025
2024	Toyota HiLux	Isuzu D-Max	Toyota Yaris Ativ ^{E}	Toyota Yaris Cross ^{J}	Honda City	Honda HRV	Ford Ranger	Isuzu mu-X ^{P}	Toyota Corolla Cross	BYD Dolphin ^{E}	2024
2023	Isuzu D-Max	Toyota HiLux	Toyota Yaris Ativ ^{E}	Honda City ^{E}	Ford Ranger	Toyota Fortuner ^{P}	Honda HR-V	Isuzu mu-X ^{P}	Toyota Corolla Cross	Toyota Yaris ^{E}	2023
2022	Isuzu D-Max	Toyota HiLux	Honda City ^{E}	Ford Ranger	Toyota Yaris ^{E}	Toyota Fortuner ^{P}	Toyota Yaris Ativ ^{E}	Mitsubishi Triton	Toyota Corolla Cross	Isuzu mu-X ^{P}	2022
2021	Isuzu D-Max	Toyota HiLux	Honda City ^{E}	Toyota Yaris ^{E}	Ford Ranger	Toyota Fortuner ^{P}	Mitsubishi Triton	Toyota Corolla Cross	Mazda 2 ^{E}	Isuzu mu-X ^{P}	2021
2020	Isuzu D-Max	Toyota HiLux	Toyota Yaris ^{E}	Honda City ^{E}	Mazda2 ^{E}	Ford Ranger	Mitsubishi Triton	Honda Civic	Nissan Almera ^{E}	Honda Jazz	2020
2019	Toyota HiLux	Isuzu D-Max	Ford Ranger	Mazda2 ^{E}	Toyota Yaris ^{E}	Mitsubishi Triton	Honda City	Honda Civic	Toyota Yaris ATIV ^{E}	Toyota Fortuner ^{P}	2019
2018	Toyota HiLux	Isuzu D-Max	Ford Ranger	Mazda2 ^{E}	Mitsubishi Triton	Toyota Yaris ^{E}	not available				2018
2017	Isuzu D-Max	Toyota HiLux	Ford Ranger	Honda City	Mitsubishi Triton	Mazda2 ^{E}	Toyota Yaris ^{E}	Honda Civic	Toyota Fortuner ^{P}	Honda Jazz	2017
2016	Toyota HiLux	Isuzu D-Max	Toyota Yaris ^{E}	Ford Ranger	Toyota Fortuner ^{P}	Honda City	Mitsubishi Triton	Mazda2 ^{E}	Honda Civic	Toyota Vios	2016
2015	Toyota HiLux	Isuzu D-Max	Toyota Yaris ^{E}	Toyota Vios	Honda City	Toyota Fortuner ^{P}	Honda HR-V	Mitsubishi Triton	Ford Ranger	Honda Jazz	2015
2014	Toyota HiLux	Isuzu D-Max	Toyota Yaris ^{E}	Toyota Vios	Honda City	Toyota Corolla Altis	not available		Ford Ranger	Isuzu mu-X ^{P}	2014
2013	Toyota HiLux	Isuzu D-Max	Toyota Vios	Honda City	Mitsubishi Triton	Nissan Almera ^{E}	Suzuki Swift ^{E}	Toyota Corolla Altis	Mitsubishi Mirage ^{E}	not available	2013
2012	Toyota HiLux	Isuzu D-Max	Toyota Vios	Honda City	Mitsubishi Triton	Nissan Almera ^{E}	not available	Chevrolet Colorado	Toyota Fortuner ^{P}	Mitsubishi Mirage ^{E}	2012
2011	Toyota HiLux	Isuzu D-Max	Toyota Vios	Mitsubishi Triton	Toyota Corolla Altis	Nissan March ^{E}	Honda City	not available			2011
2010	Toyota HiLux	Isuzu D-Max	Toyota Vios	Honda City	Toyota Corolla Altis	Honda Civic	Nissan Frontier	Mazda2	Mitsubishi Triton	Nissan March ^{E}	2010
2009	Toyota HiLux	not available									2009
2008	Toyota HiLux	not available									2008
2007	Toyota HiLux	not available									2007
2006	Toyota HiLux	Isuzu D-Max	Toyota Vios	not available							2006
2005	Isuzu D-Max	Toyota HiLux	Toyota Vios	Toyota Fortuner ^{P}	not available	Chevrolet Colorado	not available				2005
2004	Isuzu D-Max	Toyota HiLux	Toyota Soluna Vios	not available	Honda Jazz	not available					2004
2003	Isuzu D-Max	Toyota HiLux	Toyota Soluna Vios	not available							2003
2002	Toyota HiLux	Isuzu D-Max	Nissan Big M	Isuzu Faster Z	Mitsubishi L200	Toyota Corolla Altis	not available	Honda CR-V	not available		2002
2001	Isuzu Faster Z	Toyota HiLux	Toyota Corolla Altis	Nissan Big M	Mitsubishi L200	Ford Ranger	not available				2001
2000	Isuzu Faster Z	Toyota HiLux	Mitsubishi L200	Ford Ranger	Nissan Big M	Toyota Soluna	not available				2000
1999	Isuzu Faster Z	Toyota HiLux	Mitsubishi L200	Toyota Sport Rider ^{P}	Toyota Soluna	Honda City	Toyota Corolla	Nissan Big M	Ford Ranger	not available	1999
1998	Isuzu Faster Z	Toyota HiLux	Mitsubishi L200	Toyota Soluna	Nissan Big M	not available			Toyota Sport Rider ^{P}	not available	1998
1997	Isuzu Faster Z	Toyota HiLux	Nissan Big M	Toyota Soluna	Mitsubishi L200	not available					1997
1996	Isuzu Faster/Rodeo	Toyota HiLux	Nissan Big M	Mitsubishi L200	Toyota Corolla	Mitsubishi Lancer	Honda Civic	not available			1996
1995	Toyota HiLux	Isuzu Faster/Rodeo	Nissan Big M	Mitsubishi L200	Toyota Corolla	Honda Civic	Mitsubishi Lancer	Mazda Thunder	not available		1995
1994	Isuzu Faster/Rodeo	Toyota HiLux	Nissan Big M	Mitsubishi L200	Toyota Corolla	Honda Civic	not available				1994
1993	Isuzu Faster/Rodeo	Toyota HiLux	Nissan Big M	Toyota Corolla	Mitsubishi L200	not available					1993
1992	Isuzu Faster/Rodeo	Toyota HiLux	Nissan Big M	Toyota Corolla	Mitsubishi L200	Honda Civic	not available				1992
1991	Toyota HiLux	Isuzu Faster/Rodeo	Nissan Big M	Mitsubishi L200	Toyota Corolla	Toyota Corona	not available				1991
1990	Toyota HiLux	Isuzu Faster/Rodeo	Nissan Big M	Mitsubishi L200	Mazda Fighter	Toyota Corolla	not available				1990
	1st	2nd	3rd	4th	5th	6th	7th	8th	9th	10th	
See also : Best-selling models in: Australia; Brazil; India; Indonesia; Japan; Malaysia; Philippines; Sweden

== See also ==
- Automotive industry
- Automotive industry by country
- List of automobile manufacturers of Asia
- List of countries by motor vehicle production
