= Mazda BT-50 =

Compact/mid-sized pickup truck produced by Mazda

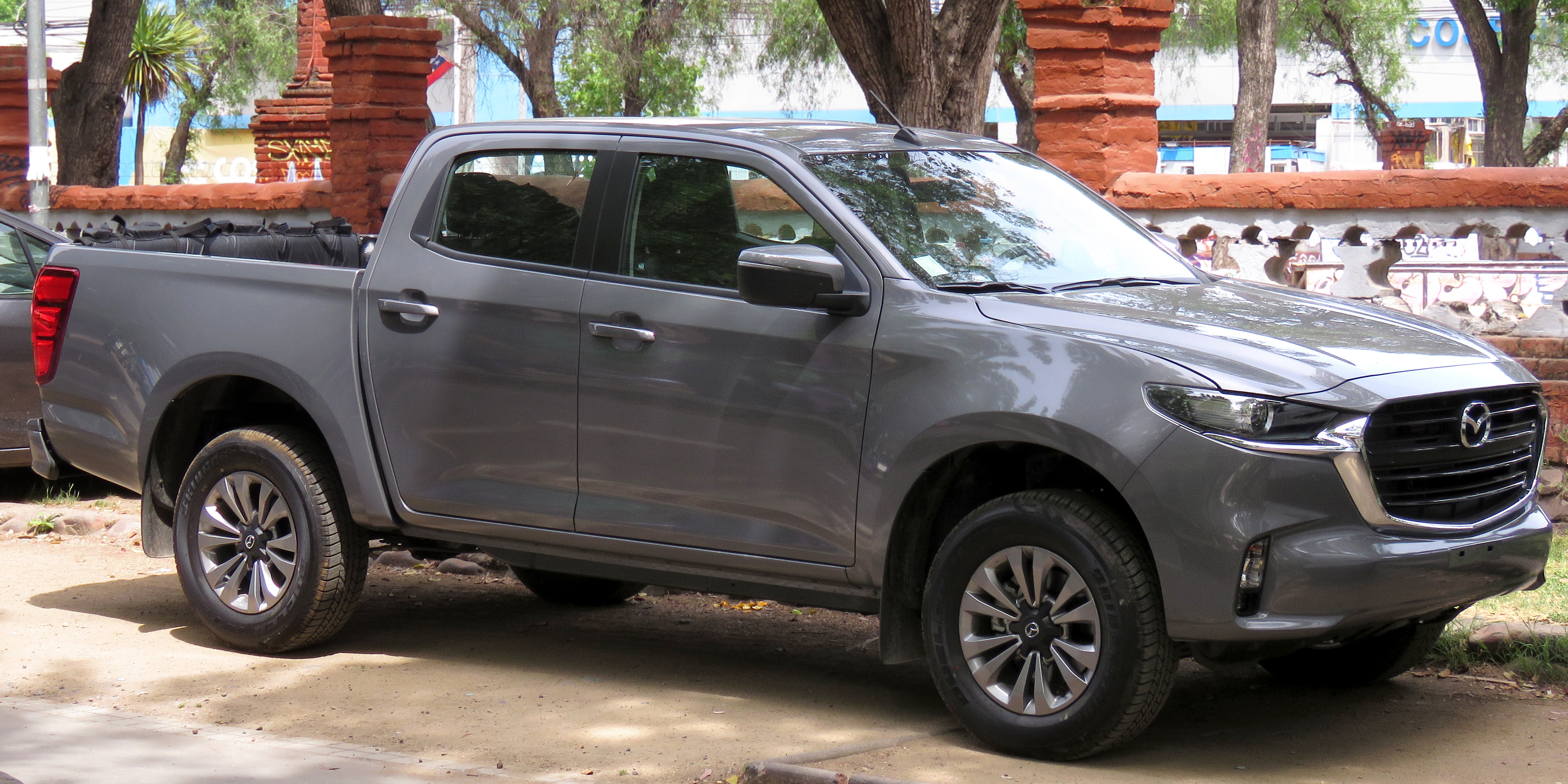

Overview
- Manufacturer: Mazda (2006–2020); Isuzu (2020–present)
- Production: 2006–present

Body and chassis
- Class: Mid-size pickup truck
- Layout: Front-engine, rear-wheel drive or four-wheel drive

Chronology
- Predecessor: Mazda B series

The Mazda BT-50 is a compact pickup truck (first generation) / mid-size pickup truck (since the second generation) marketed by the Japanese manufacturer Mazda since 2006. It is a larger version of the predecessor B-Series pickup and is not sold in the Japanese and North American markets. The second-generation Ranger has been designed by Ford Australia, with a Mazda derivative sold as the BT-50. The third-generation BT-50 was revealed in 2020, based on the Isuzu D-Max.

== First generation (UN; 2006) ==
First generation
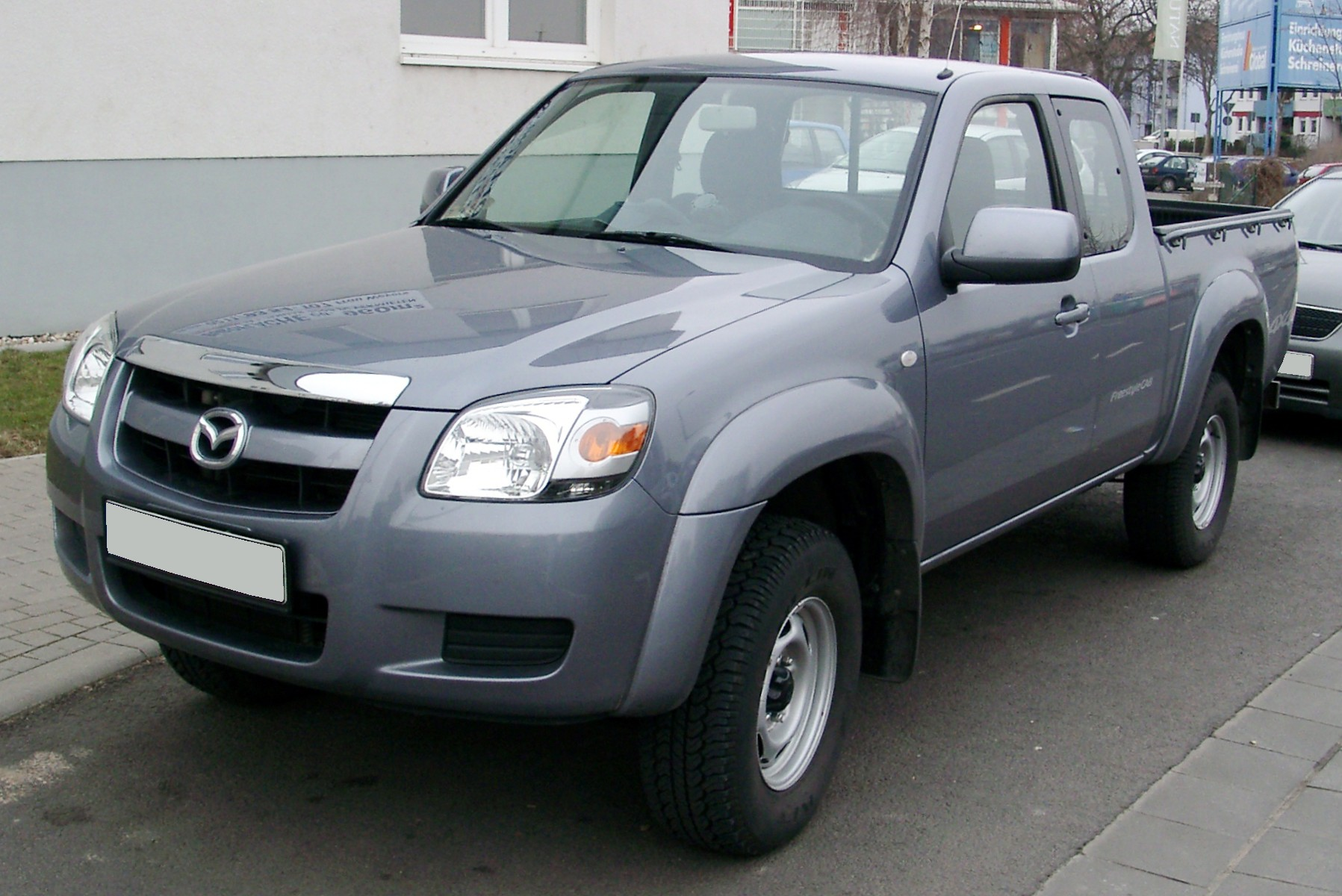

Overview
- Model code: UN
- Production: 2006–2011
- Assembly: Thailand: Rayong (AAT); Colombia: Bogotá (CCA); Zimbabwe: Willowvale (Willowvale Motor Industries); South Africa: Silverton, Pretoria (Ford South Africa)

Body and chassis
- Class: Compact pickup truck
- Body style: 2-door single cab 2-door extended cab 4-door double cab
- Related: Ford Ranger (PJ/PK); Ford Everest (first generation)

Powertrain
- Engine: Diesel: 2.5 L MZR-CD I4 turbo; 3.0 L MZR-CD I4 turbo
- Transmission: 5-speed M5OD manual 5-speed automatic

Dimensions
- Wheelbase: 2,985 mm (117.5 in) (double cab)
- Length: 5,170 mm (203.5 in) (double cab)
- Width: 1,804 mm (71.0 in) (double cab)
- Height: 1,762 mm (69.4 in) (double cab)
- Curb weight: 1,763–1,878 kg (3,887–4,140 lb)

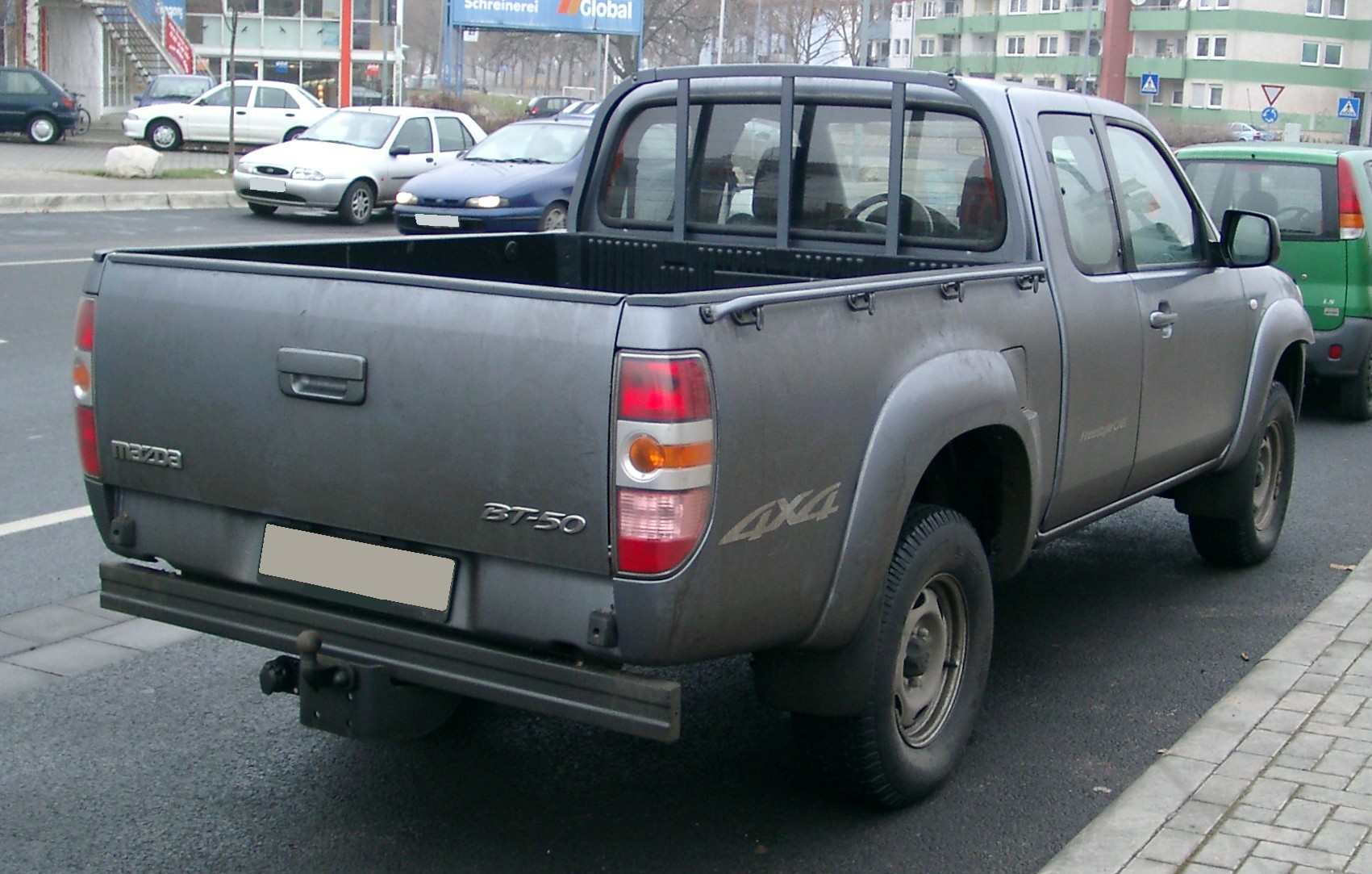
Rear view

The BT-50 was launched at the Bangkok International Motor Show on 22 March 2006. It shares its Duratorq/MZR-CD 2.5- and 3.0-liter diesel inline-four engines with the Ranger. In late November 2006, the new five-speed automatic transmission with Borg Warner transfer case has been added, as well as side airbags.

The BT-50 received a minor redesign in the first quarter of 2008, with a revised interior and several optional items made standard.

The model sold in Mexico and Central and South America includes these options:

- A 2.6-liter straight-4 4x4 only, same engine and transmission used in the previous Mazda B2600
- A 2.2-liter straight-4 4x2 only, entry-level model same as the old B2200
- A 2.5-liter diesel straight-4 either 4x2 or 4x4

=== Production ===
European and Thai models of the Ford Ranger and Mazda BT-50 are built in Thailand. South African Ford Ranger and Mazda BT-50 models are built in Pretoria, South Africa. Latin American Mazda BT-50s are built in Colombia, replaced by the Ford Ranger T6 built in Argentina since 2012. Mazda BT-50 was also assembled by the Willowvale Mazda Motor Industries in Zimbabwe from 2007 to 2010 and the most significant BT-50 assembled was the one on a 2.2-litre F2 petrol engine.

The Mazda BT-50 is neither sold nor built in Japan.

=== Safety ===
ANCAP test results* Mazda BT-50 DX dual-cab 4x4 (2008)
Test	Score
Overall	3 /5 stars
Frontal offset	6.46/16
Side impact	16/16
Pole	Not Assessed
Seat belt reminders	0/3
Whiplash protection	Not Assessed
Pedestrian protection	Poor
Electronic stability control	Not Available

== Second generation (UP, UR; 2011) ==
Second generation
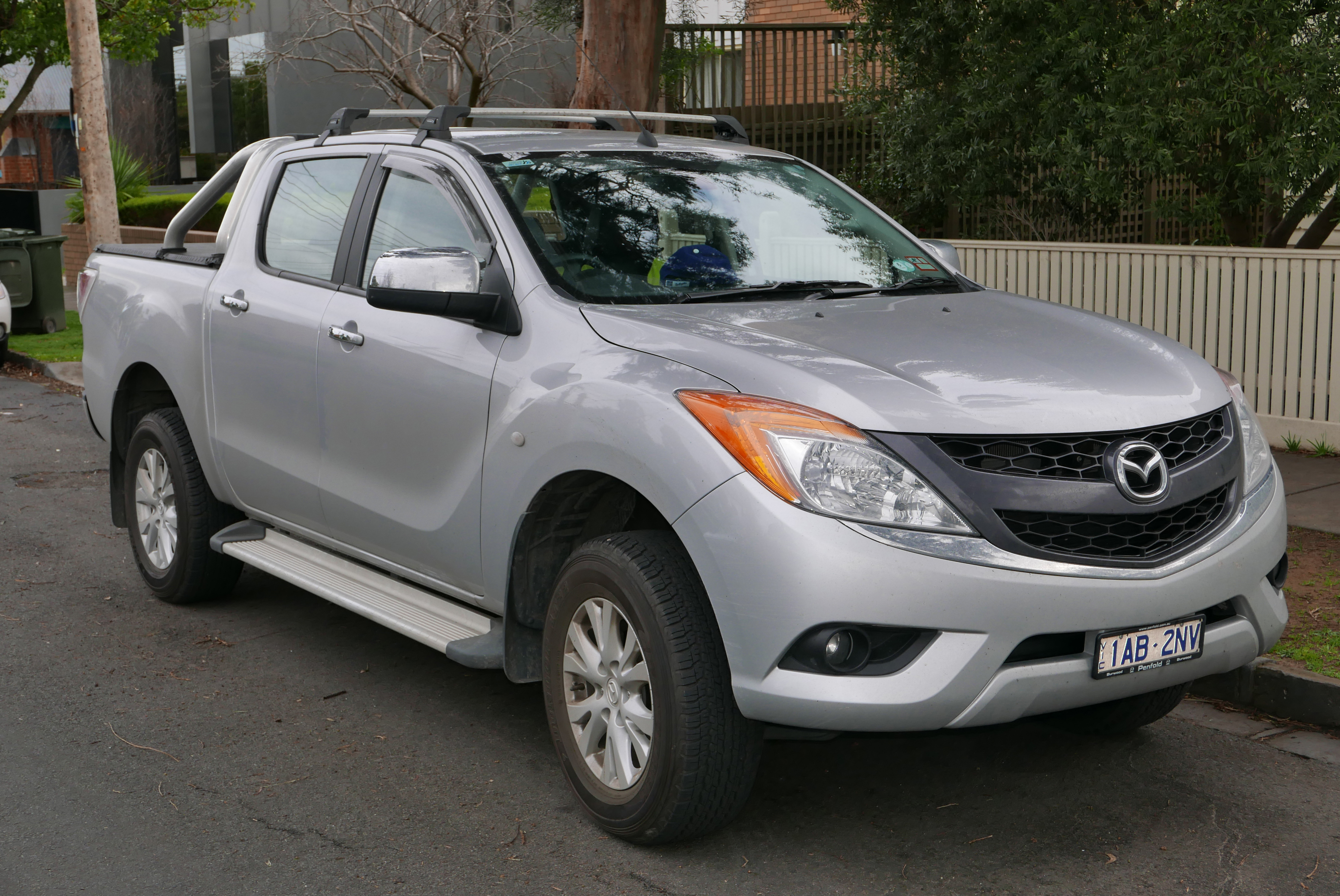
- 2014 Mazda BT-50 SDX (pre-facelift)

Overview
- Model code: UP/UR
- Production: 2011–2020
- Assembly: Thailand: Rayong (AAT); South Africa: Silverton, Pretoria (Ford South Africa)
- Designer: Ryo Yanagisawa

Body and chassis
- Body style: 2-door single cab; 4-door extended cab with rear clamshell doors; 4-door double cab
- Platform: Ford T6 platform
- Related: Ford Ranger (P375)

Powertrain
- Engine: Diesel: 2.2 L MZ-CD I4 turbo; 3.2 L MZ-CD I5 turbo
- Transmission: 6-speed manual 6-speed automatic

Dimensions
- Wheelbase: 3,226 mm (127.0 in)
- Length: 5,359 mm (211.0 in)
- Width: 1,849 mm (72.8 in)
- Height: 1,741 mm (68.5 in) (single cab); 1,837 mm (72.3 in) (double cab); 1,856 mm (73.1 in) (freestyle cab)
- Kerb weight: 1,708–2,051 kg (3,765–4,522 lb)

A full model change of the Mazda BT-50 was revealed in October 2010 at the Australian International Motor Show. It is based on the Ford Ranger (T6).

While the BT-50 version was designed by a Mazda team based at Ford Australia's design center in Melbourne, both Ford and Mazda worked independently. Of the exterior panels, only the windscreen, roof, and rear screen are common between the Ranger and BT-50, although the underpinnings are largely the same.

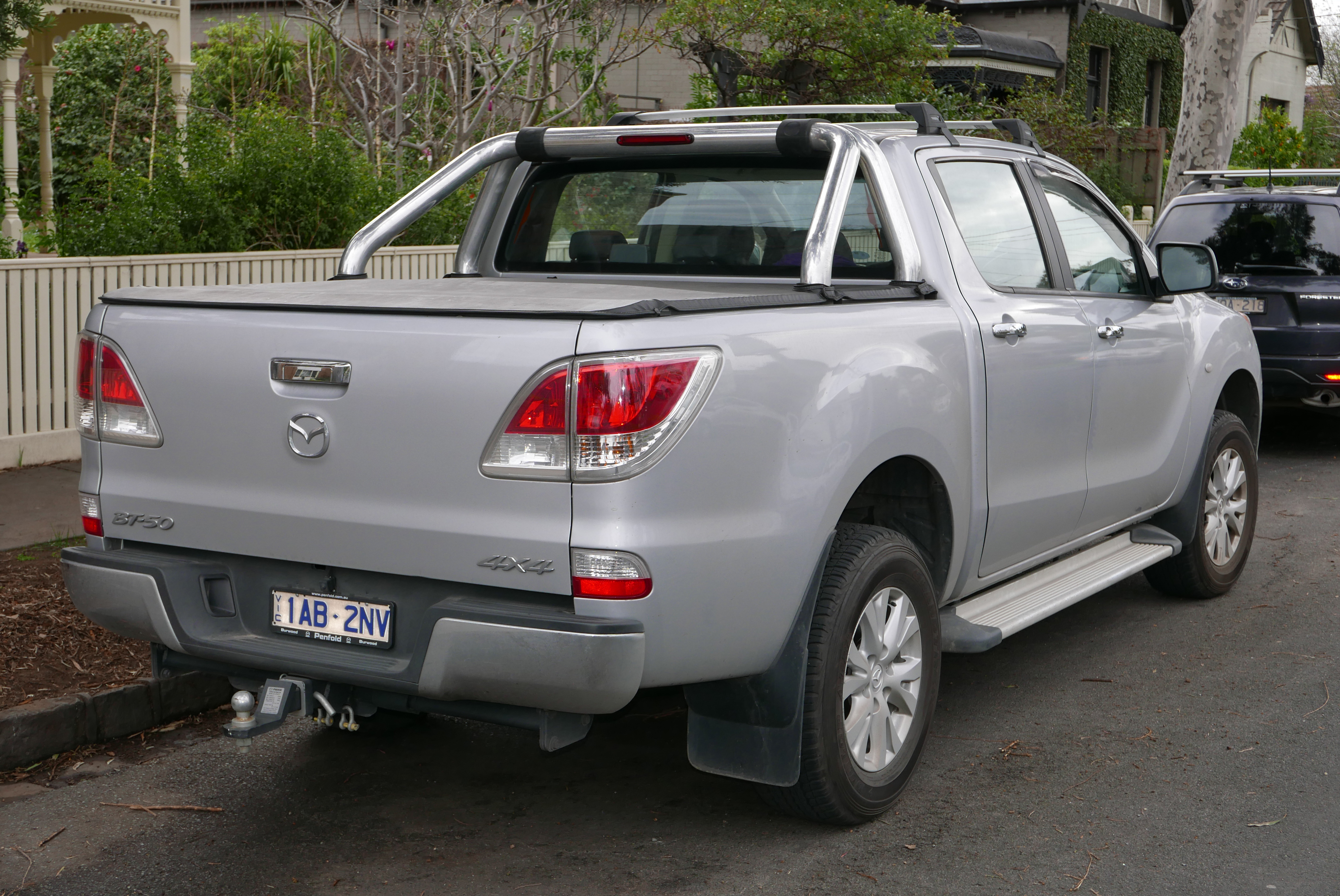
Mazda BT-50 XTR (pre-facelift)

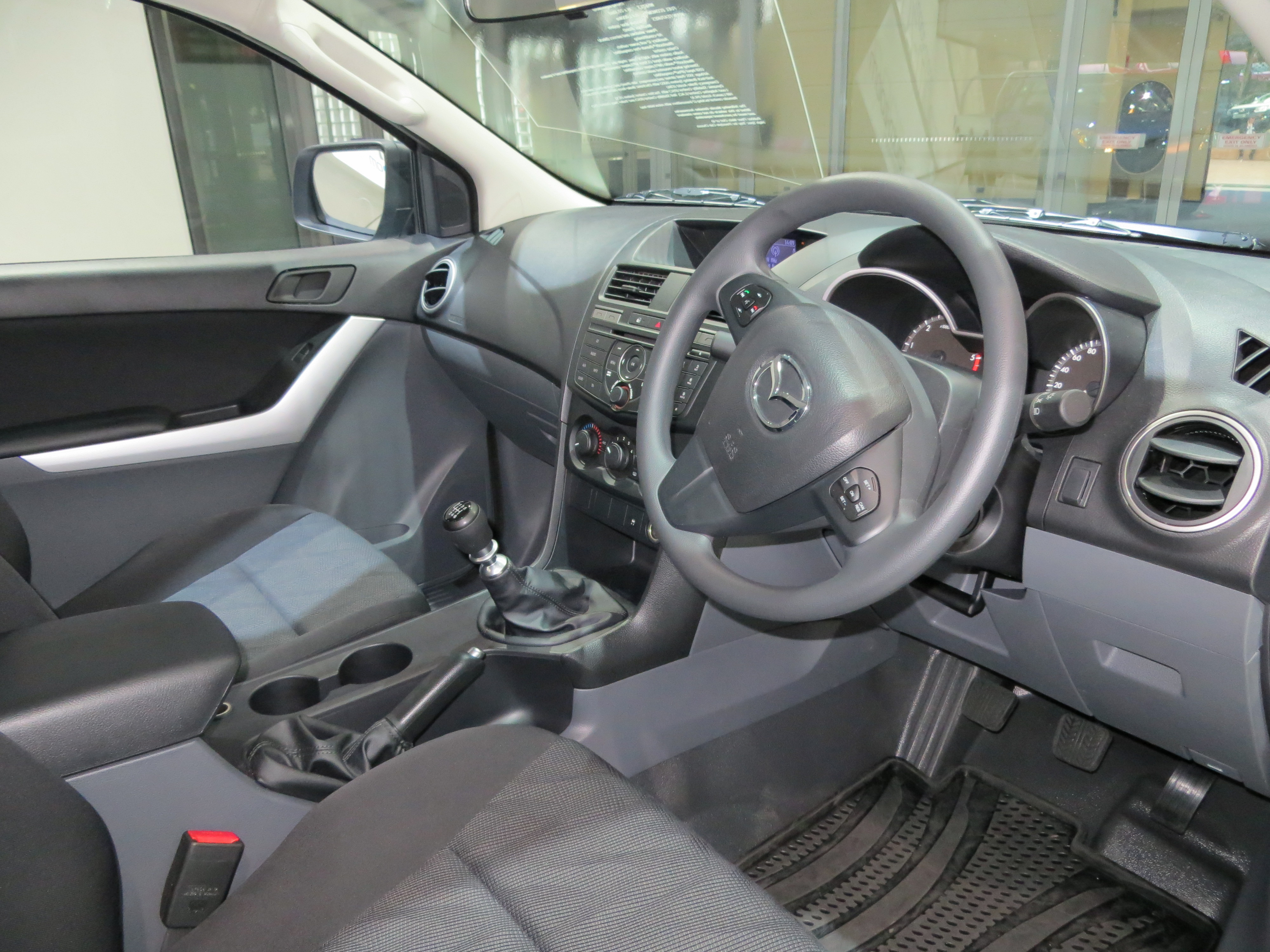
Interior

=== Facelift ===
A revised BT-50 for the 2016 model year debuted in July 2015 and launched into the Australian market in September 2015. The UR series facelift is mainly cosmetic without any changes in engine specifications, however, several equipment changes and slight price differences over the pre-facelift model are present. Another facelift for the second-generation BT-50 was launched for the Australian market in 2018. Changes includes revised looks and Apple CarPlay and Android Auto support through an Alpine head unit.

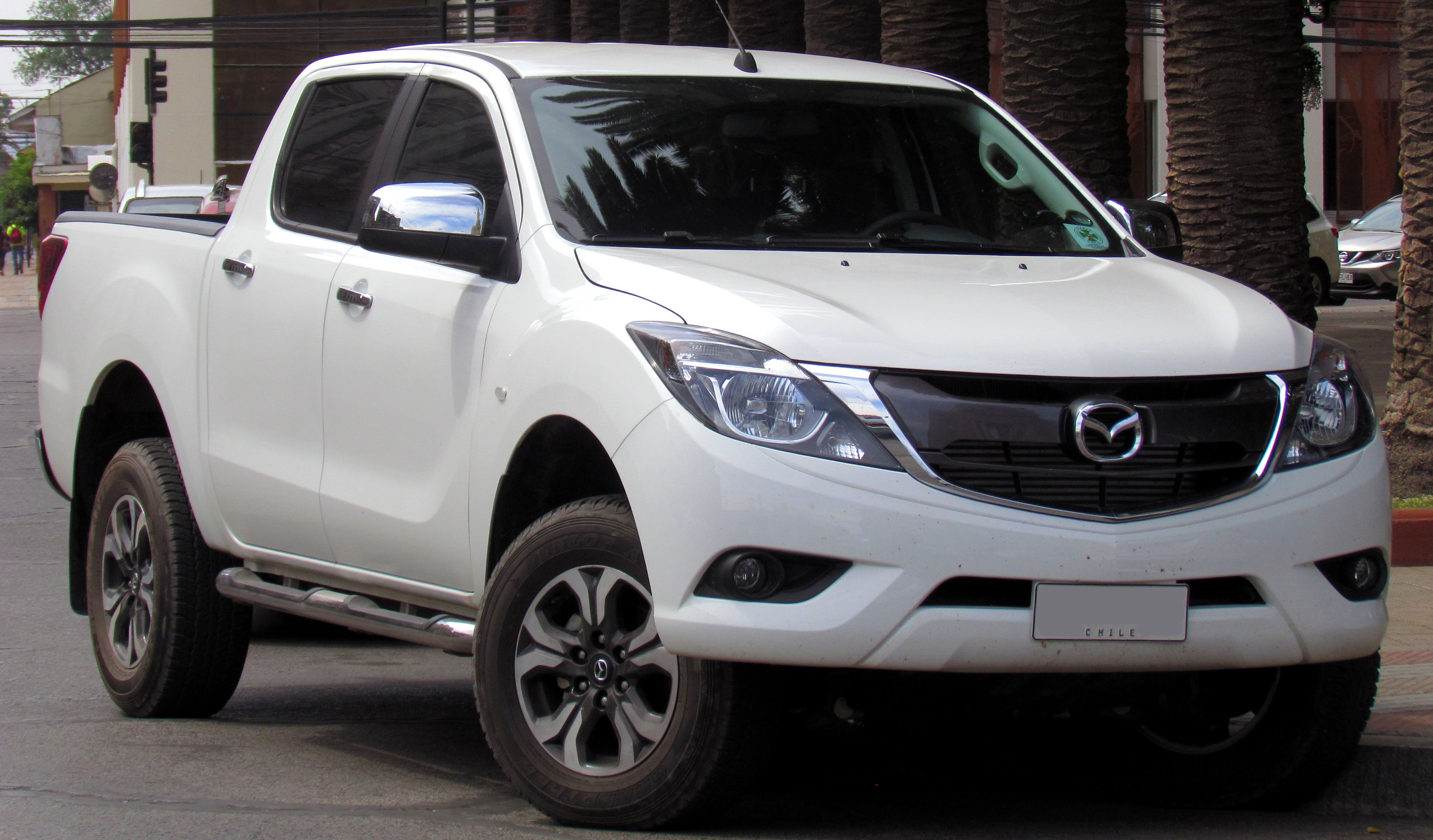
Mazda BT-50 SDX (facelift)

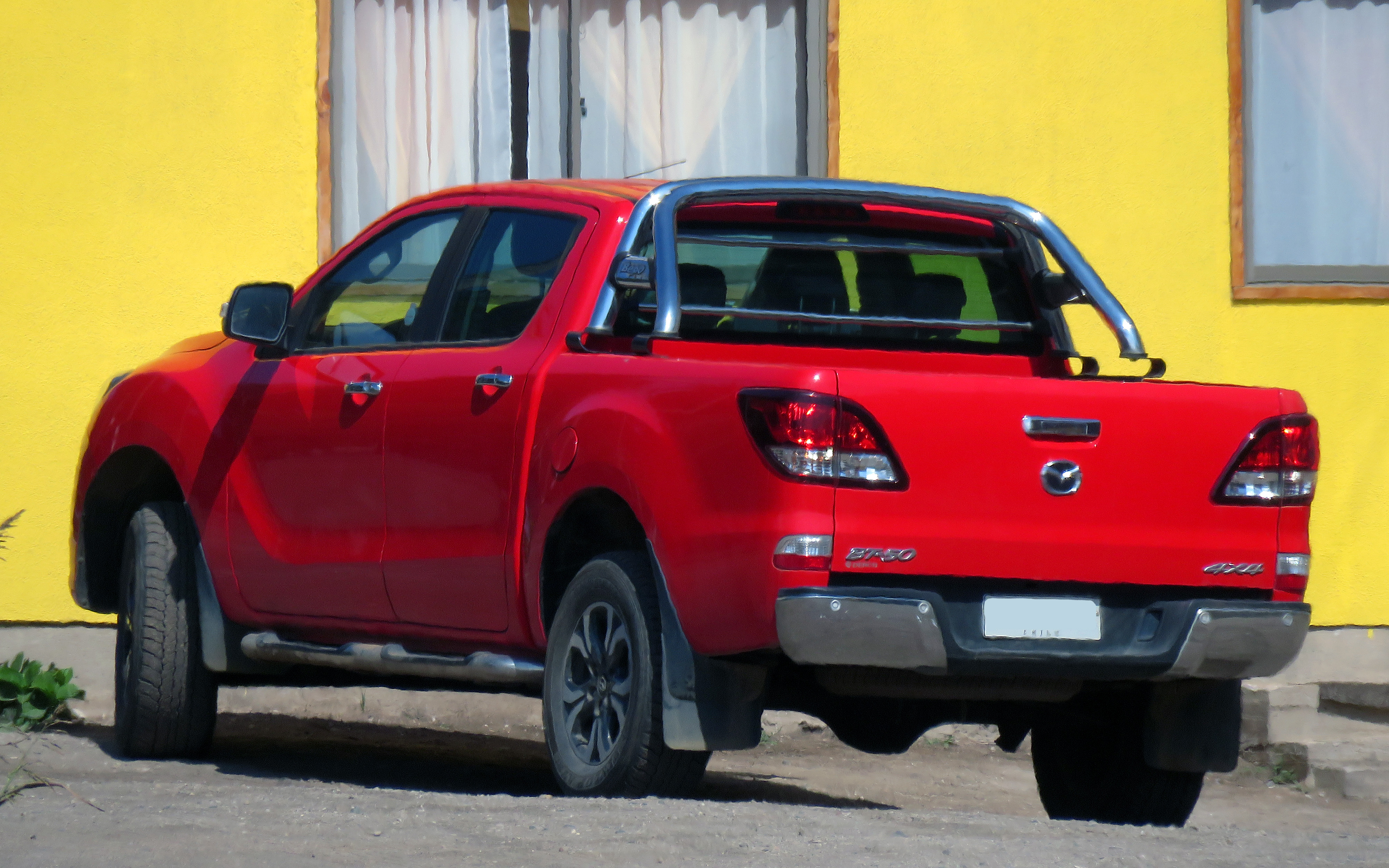
Mazda BT-50 4x4 (facelift)

=== Pangolin Edition ===
In November 2020, Mazda Philippines launched the BT-50 4x4 Pangolin Edition to raise awareness of the endangered pangolin. This variant featured a matte black grille, aluminum roof rack, roll bars, riveted fender flares, 17-inch Rota alloy wheels, and a white pangolin decal on each side.

=== Safety ===
ANCAP test results* Mazda BT-50 Single cab variants with bench seat (2011)
Test	Score
Overall	5 /5 stars
Frontal offset	15.72/16
Side impact	16/16
Pole	2/2
Seat belt reminders	1/3
Whiplash protection	Not Assessed
Pedestrian protection	Poor
Electronic stability control	Standard

ANCAP test results* Mazda BT-50 all variants (2011)
Test	Score
Overall	5 /5 stars
Frontal offset	15.72/16
Side impact	16/16
Pole	2/2
Seat belt reminders	2/3
Whiplash protection	Not Assessed
Pedestrian protection	Not Assessed
Electronic stability control	Standard

== Third generation (TF; 2020) ==
Third generation
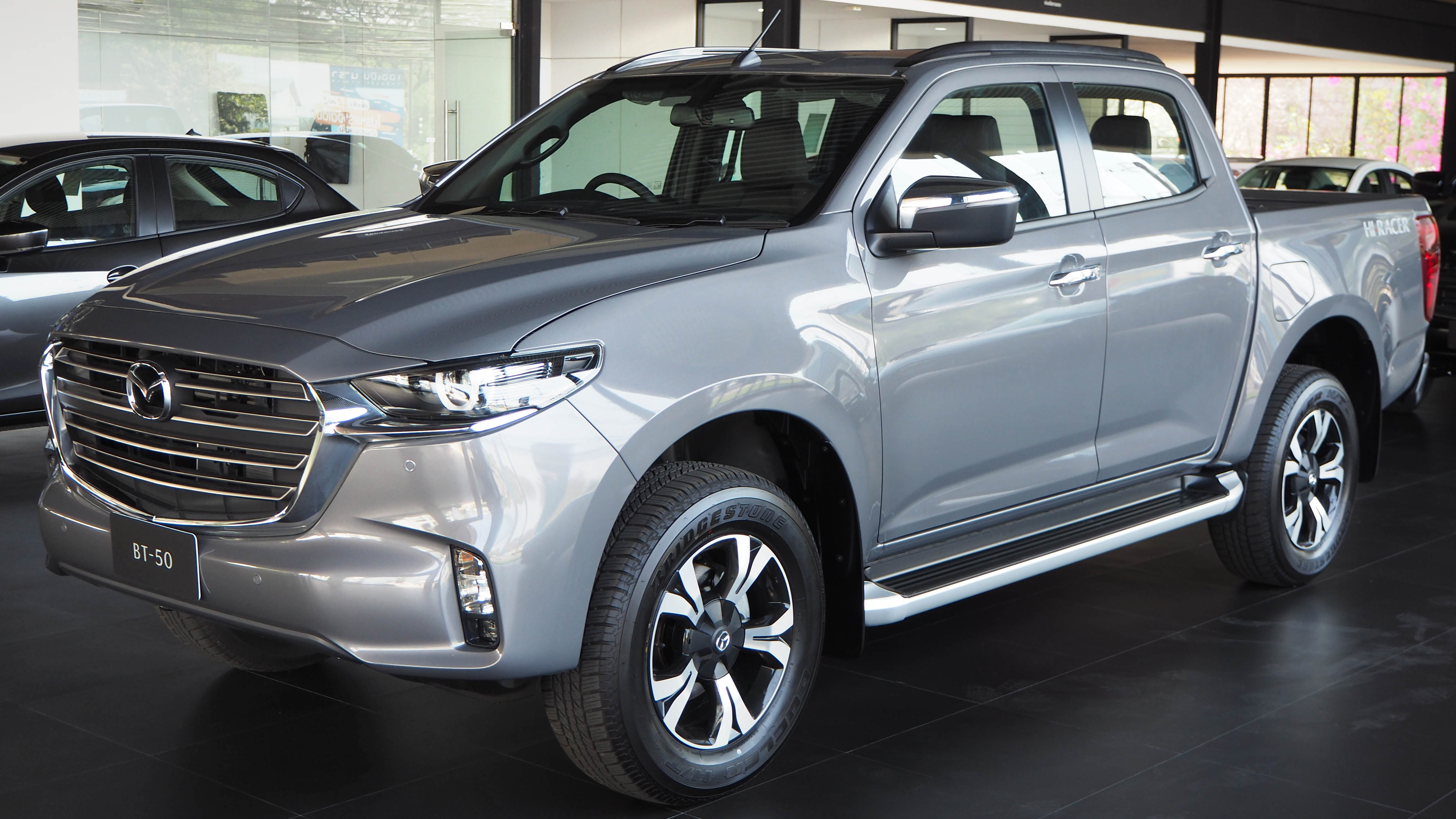
- Mazda BT-50 Hi-Racer Double-Cab (Thailand)

Overview
- Model code: TF
- Production: 2020–present
- Assembly: Thailand: Samut Prakan (Isuzu Motors Thailand)
- Designer: Eiji Kimoto

Body and chassis
- Body style: 2-door single cab; 4-door extended cab with rear clamshell doors; 4-door double cab
- Related: Isuzu D-Max

Powertrain
- Engine: Diesel: 1.9 L RZ4E-TC GEN2 I4-T (diesel); 2.2 L RZ4F-TC I4-T (diesel); 3.0 L 4JJ3-TCX I4-T (diesel)
- Transmission: 6-speed Aisin AE6 manual; 6-speed AW TB60-LS automatic; 8-speed Aisin LB500 "Rev-Tronic" automatic (2024)

Dimensions
- Wheelbase: 3,125 mm (123.0 in)
- Length: 5,245 mm (206.5 in) (single cab); 5,280 mm (207.9 in) (freestyle cab & double cab)
- Width: 1,810–1,870 mm (71.3–73.6 in)
- Height: 1,690–1,790 mm (66.5–70.5 in)

The third-generation BT-50 was unveiled in Australia on 17 June 2020. Unlike its predecessors, the BT-50 was developed from the third-generation Isuzu D-Max. The pickup is a result of a tie-up between Mazda and Isuzu which was announced on 11 July 2016, with Isuzu agreeing to supply pickup trucks to Mazda. An Isuzu executive told Australian media CarsGuide that Mazda had no involvement in the development of the D-Max, and that Mazda will be handed a finished pick-up truck instead. As the result, the TF BT-50 is built at Isuzu Motors plant in Samrong, Samut Prakan, Thailand.

The vehicle features the Mazda's Kodo design language similar to its crossover line-up. While it still shares the base structure, body shell and the wing mirrors with the Isuzu D-Max, Mazda made most of the body panels unique. It is powered by the Isuzu-sourced 3.0-litre 4JJ3-TCX inline-four turbo-diesel engine, replacing the 3.2-litre MZ-CD inline-five Ford Duratorq turbodiesel engine.

For the first time, the third-generation BT-50 is available with adaptive cruise control which is aided by twin cameras in the windscreen rather than a radar sensor in the grille, as to make the installation of off-road accessories in the front of the vehicle possible. Autonomous emergency braking, blind zone warning, rear cross-traffic alert, lane-keeping assistance and centre airbags are also available in select trims.

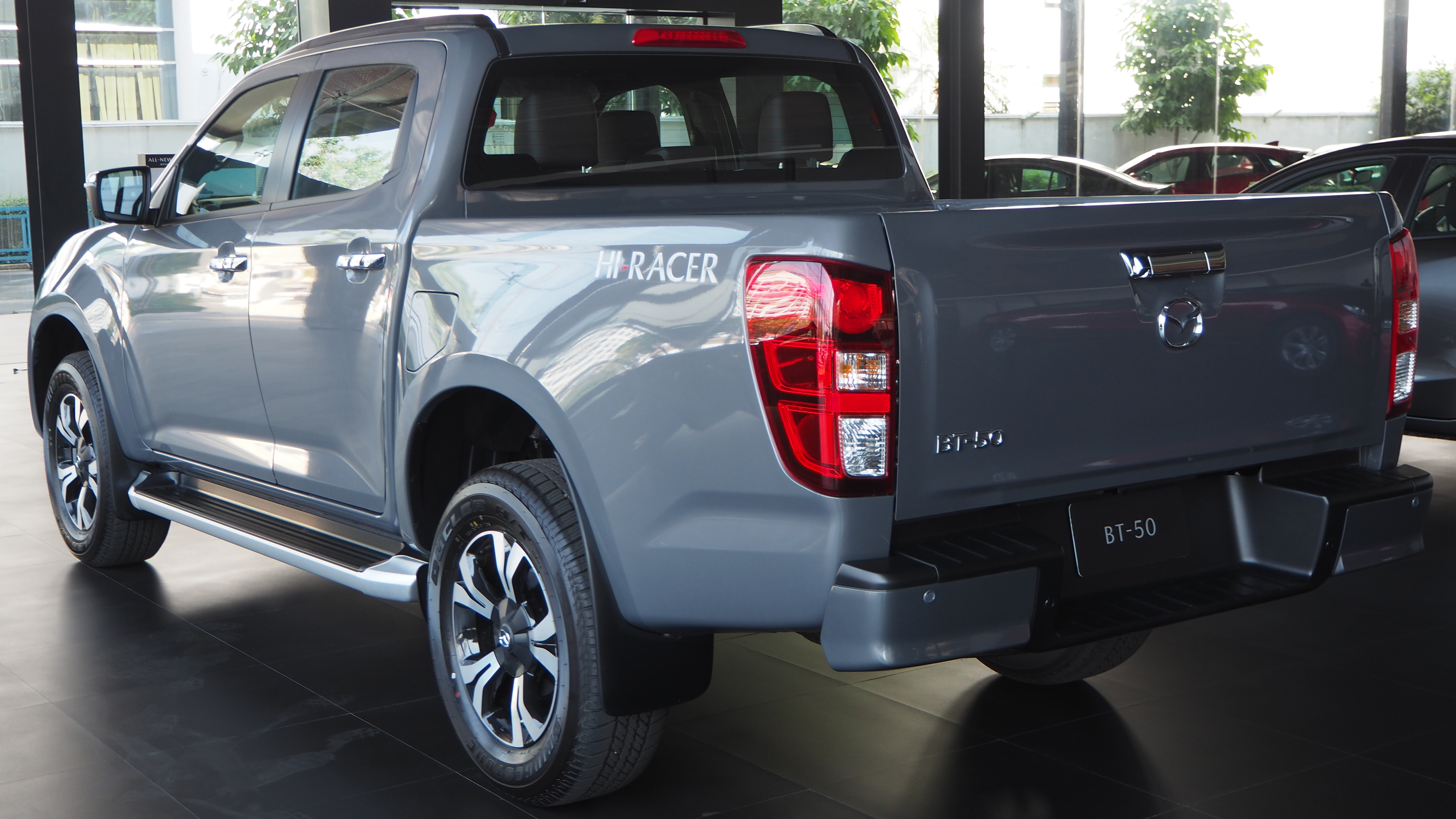
Rear view

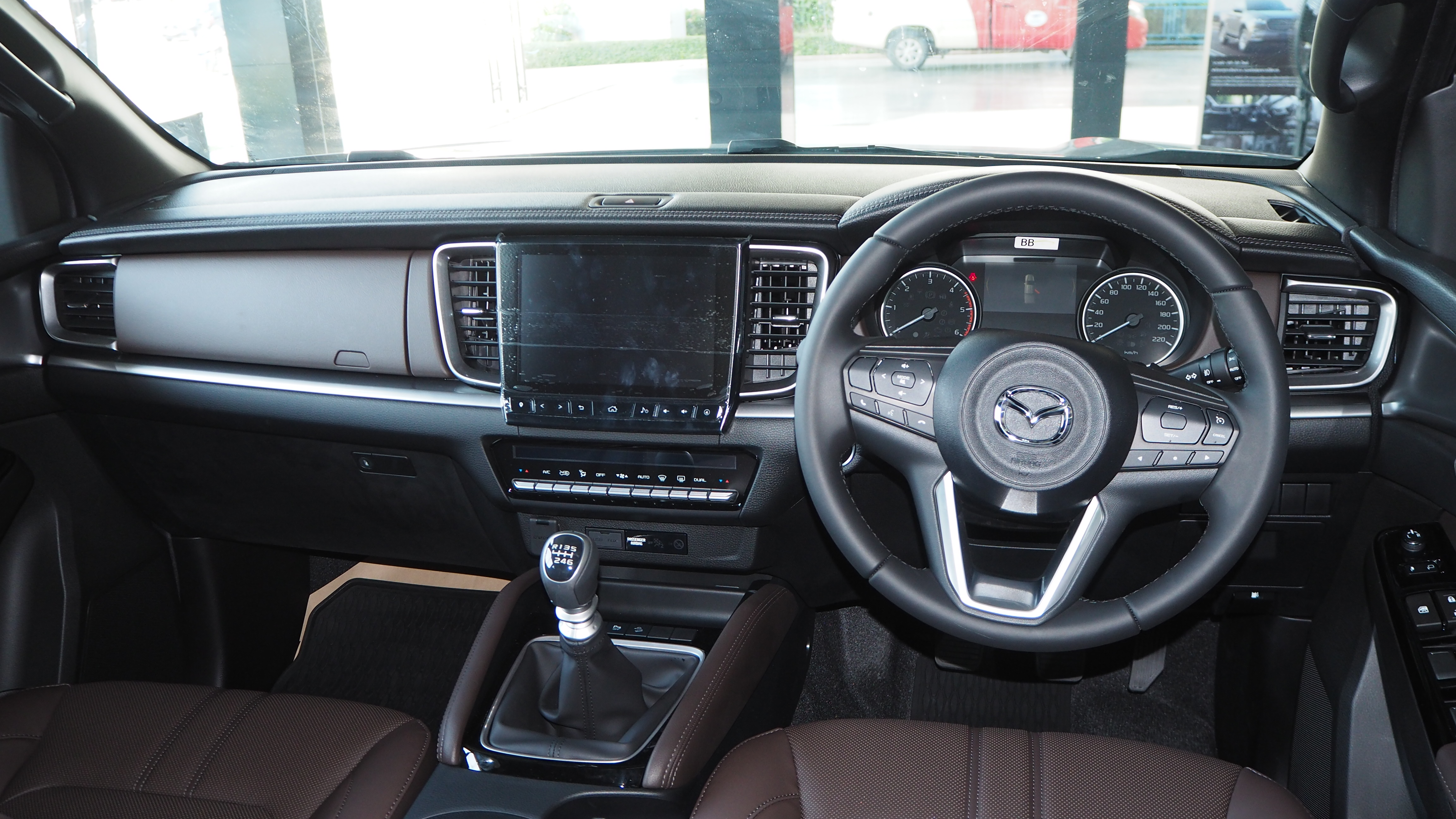
Interior

=== Markets ===
==== Australia ====
The third-generation BT-50 was released in Australia in October 2020, with three trim levels: XT, XTR and GT. In Australia, it is available in single cab, extended cab and double cab configurations. At launch, it was only available with the 3.0-litre turbo diesel engine. In November 2021, the 1.9-litre turbo diesel engine were introduced and entry-level XS trim was added to the line-up. In March 2026, the Boss and Thunder variants were introduced, both variants are powered by the 3.0-litre turbo diesel engine.

==== Malaysia ====
The third-generation BT-50 was launched on 30 November 2021. It comes in four trims: 1.9 Single Cab 4x4 (manual only), 1.9 Mid 4x4 (manual and automatic), 1.9 High 4x4 (automatic only) and 3.0 High Plus 4x4 (automatic only).

The facelifted model was launched in Malaysia on 5 November 2025, in the sole 3.0D High Plus variant, powered by the 3.0-litre turbo diesel engine.

==== Philippines ====
The third-generation BT-50 was released on 17 November 2021. It comes in two trims: 4x2 Standard (6-speed manual and automatic) and 4x4 Premium (automatic only). All variants are powered with the 3.0-litre 4JJ3-TCX engine.

The facelifted model was launched in the Philippines on 23 April 2025, with two variants: 4x2 and 4x4 Pangolin.

==== Thailand ====
The third-generation BT-50 was released in Thailand on 21 January 2021, with five variants: C, S, S Hi-Racer, SP Hi-Racer, and SP. In Thailand, it is available in single cab, extended cab and double cab configurations. It is available with either a 1.9-litre or 3.0-litre turbo diesel engines.

The facelifted model was launched in Thailand on 28 November 2024, with four variants: Hi-Racer 2.2 XS, Hi-Racer 2.2 XT, Hi-Racer 3.0 XTR, and 3.0 XTR.

=== Facelift ===
The BT-50 received a facelift on 18 October 2024. The changes includes an updated front fascia with new headlights and new grille similar to the Mazda CX-5, new tailamps, larger Mazda logo on the front fascia and the tailgate, a tweaked front and rear bumpers, an integrated air curtain for the front bumper for improved aerodynamics, new taillights, new exterior colours. Inside, there is a new 7-inch digital driver display which can display off-road information, a new 9-inch touchscreen infotainment system and wireless connectivity for Android Auto. The safety features have been updated and new stereo cameras have been added at the front.

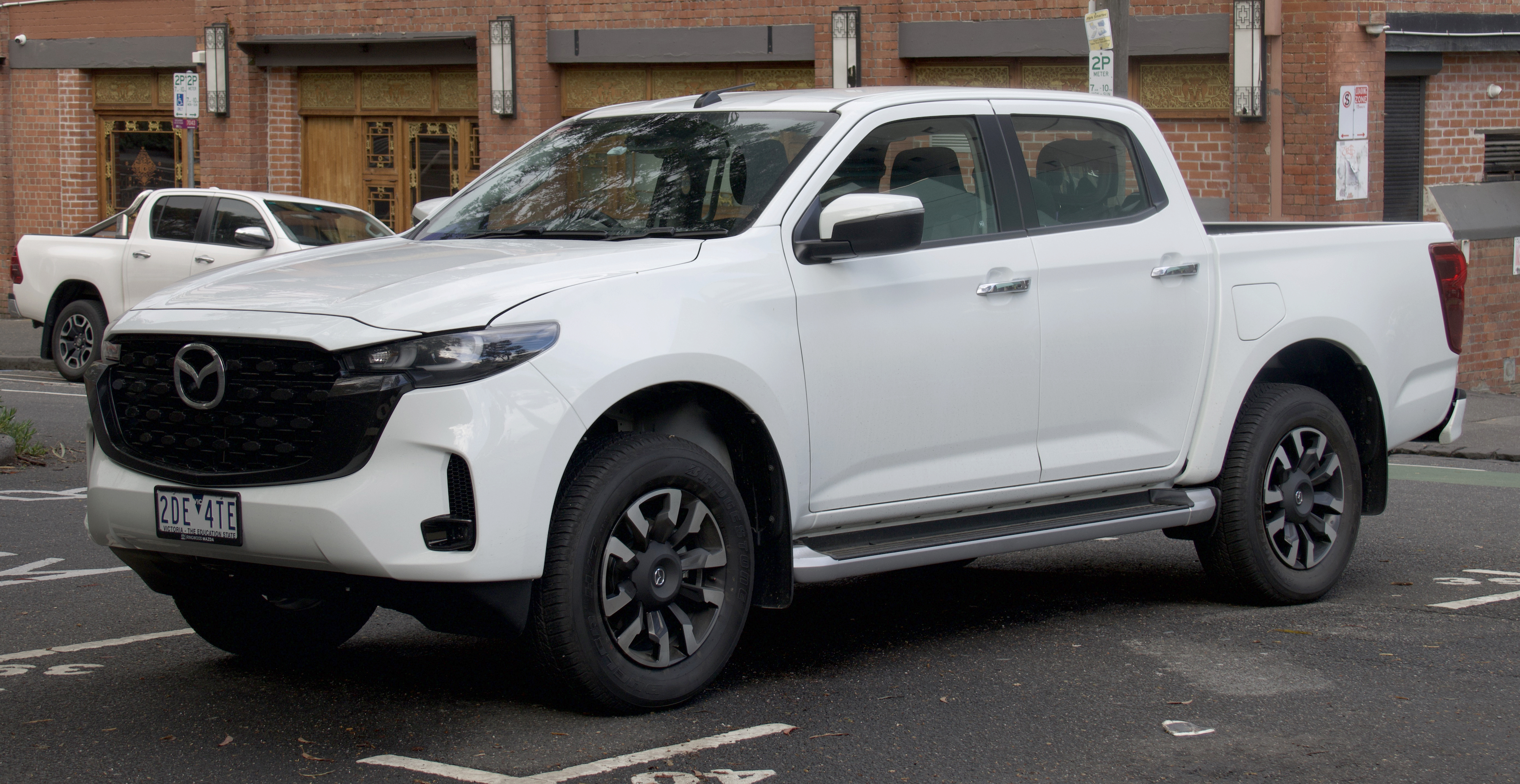
2024 facelift (XT, Australia)

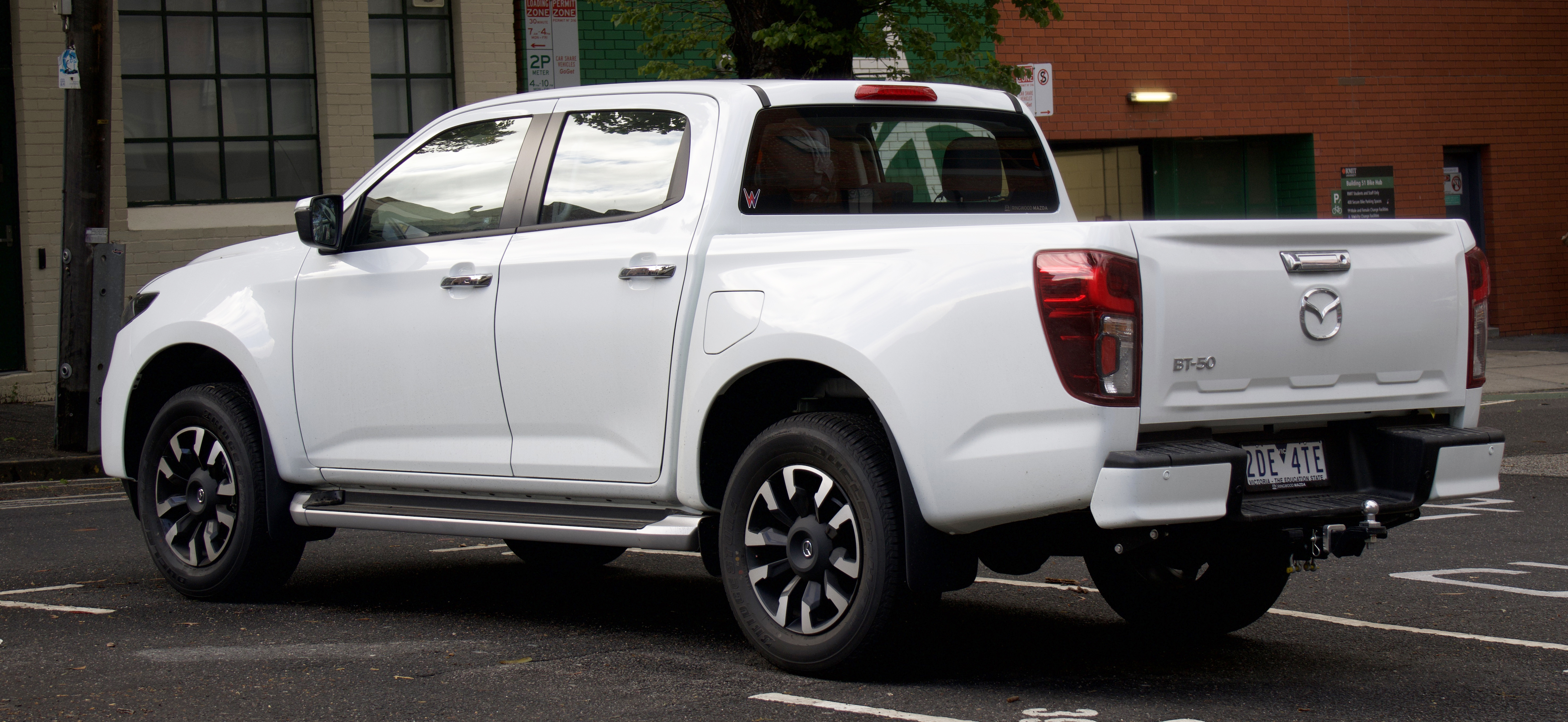
2024 facelift (XT, Australia)

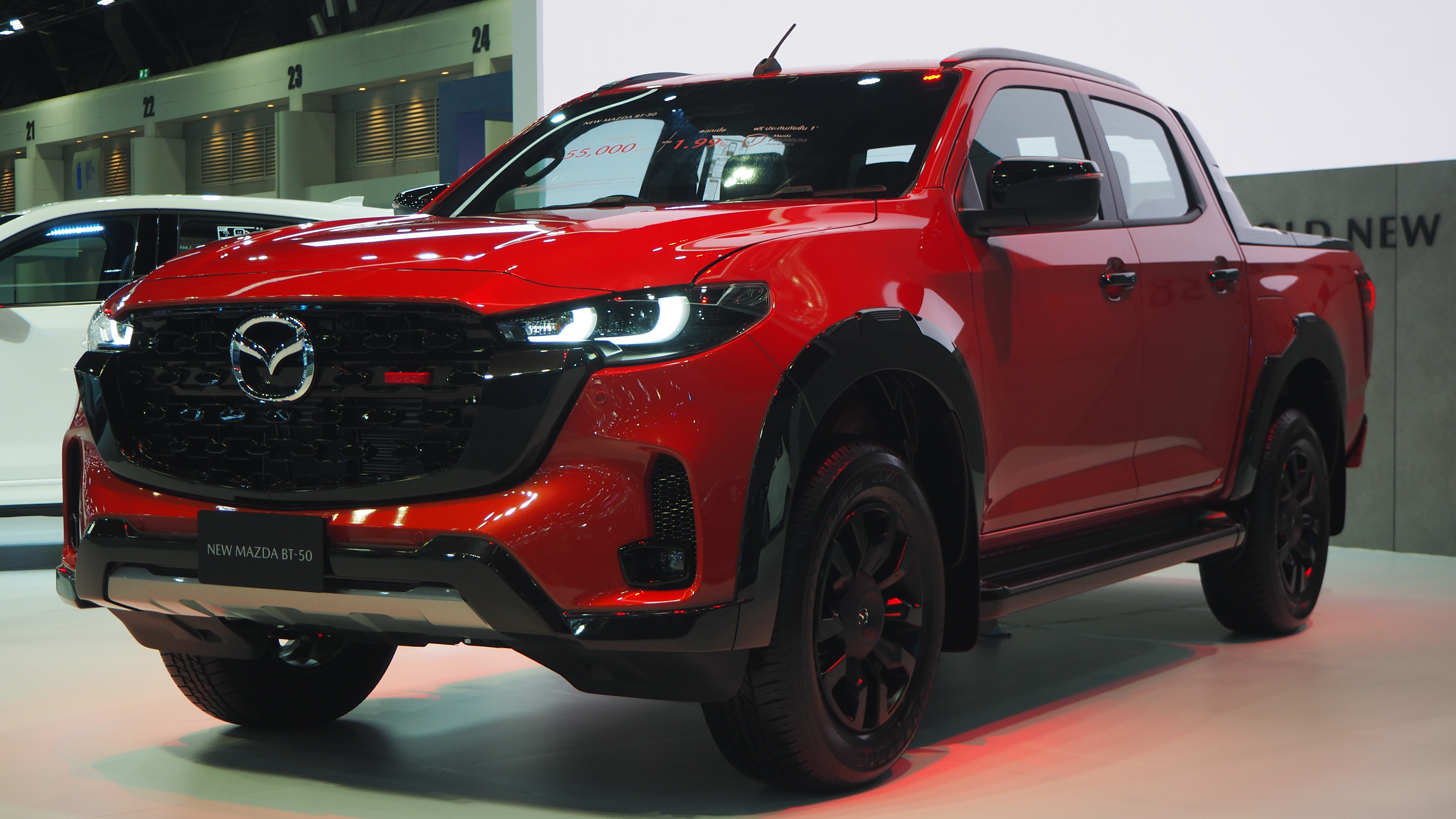
2024 facelift (XTR, Thailand)

=== Safety ===
ANCAP test results Mazda BT-50 All variants excluding Thunder (2020, aligned with Euro NCAP)
Test	Points	%
Overall:	5 /5 stars	
Adult occupant:	31.66	83%
Child occupant:	44	89%
Pedestrian:	36.62	67%
Safety assist:	13.49	84%

ANCAP test results Mazda BT-50 All variants excluding Thunder & XTR LE (2022, aligned with Euro NCAP)
Test	Points	%
Overall:	5 /5 stars	
Adult occupant:	33	86%
Child occupant:	44	89%
Pedestrian:	36.62	67%
Safety assist:	13.49	84%

== Sales ==
Calendar year	Thailand	Australia
2014	12,931	
2015	8,054	
2016	7,052	
2017	5,939	
2018	7,498	
2019	5,664	11,357
2020	2,711	9,588
2021	1,441	15,662
2022	1,506	12,937
2023	834	17,526
2024	486	15,164

== See also ==
- List of Mazda vehicles
