= Isuzu Motors (Thailand) =

- Company type: Subsidiary
- Industry: Manufacturing
- Founded: 1966; 60 years ago
- Headquarters: Samrong Tai, Samut Prakan, Thailand
- Products: Commercial vehicles, trucks and bus chassis
- Owner: Isuzu

Isuzu Motors Co., (Thailand) Ltd. is an automotive manufacturer based in Samrong Tai, Samut Prakan, Thailand. It is the Thai subsidiary of Isuzu.

== History ==
Isuzu began to build vehicles in Thailand since 1963 by the Isuzu Assembling Plant. Isuzu Motors (Thailand) was established in 1966 when it established a manufacturing factory for pick-up trucks in the Samut Prakan Province with a capacity of 155,000 units per year. Isuzu would quickly become a market leader and by 2002, the company transferred its original production base from Fujisawa, Kanagawa, Japan to its Thai subsidiary. Isuzu claimed the largest share of the Thai commercial vehicle market, having outperformed its competitors since 1988. By 2006, the company transferred to an industrial zone in Chachoengsao Province so they can support further production expansion. By 2017, Isuzu has been exporting pick-up trucks, with shipments being sent to North America, Latin America, Australia, and Japan. Also in the same year, they announced that their profit had jumped by 7 percent and has doubled its annual truck production in order to meet overseas demands.

== Models ==
- D-Max
- Mazda BT-50 (TF)
- Elf
- MU-X
