= Ford Everest =

Mid-size SUV produced by Ford

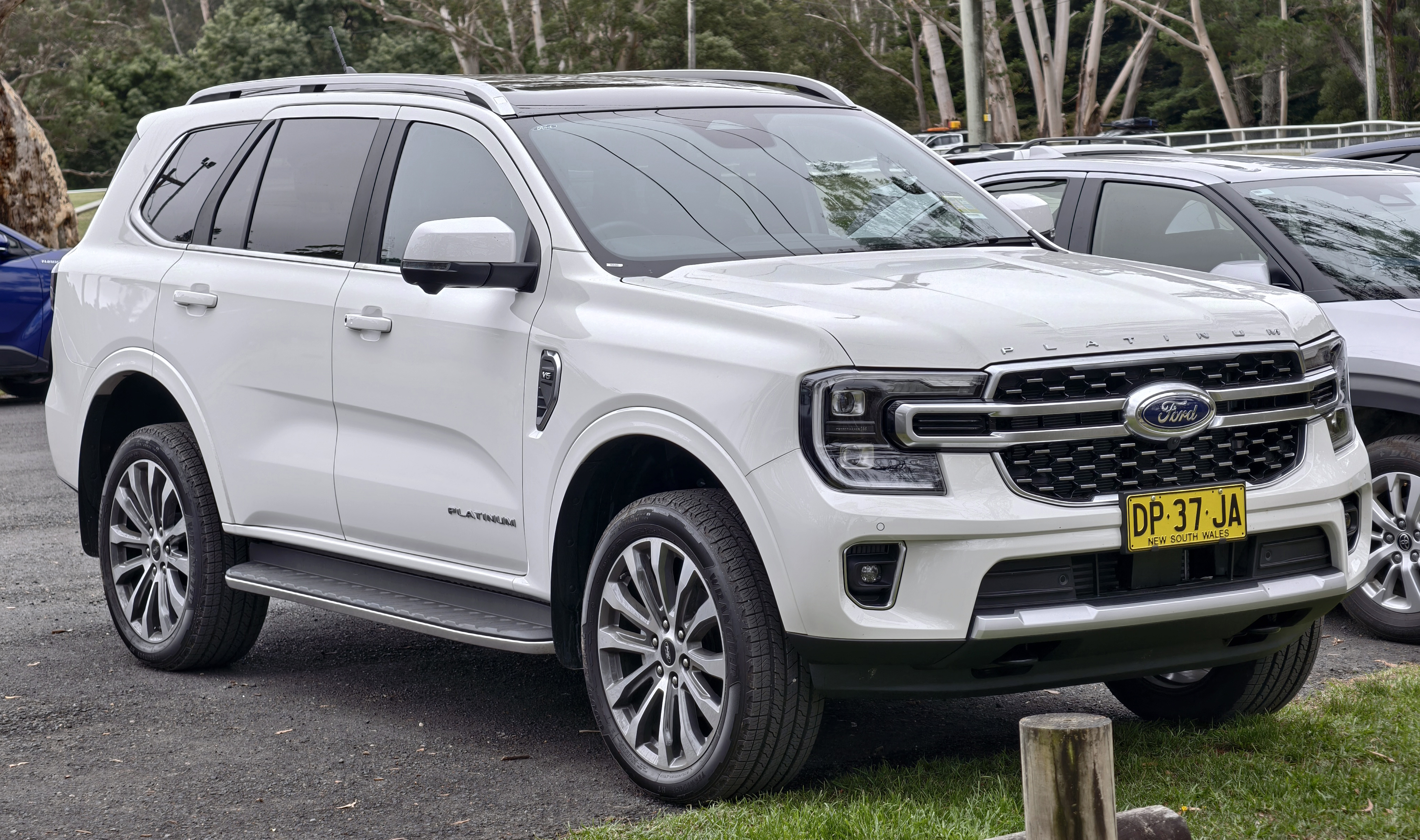
- Ford Everest Platinum

Overview
- Manufacturer: Ford
- Also called: Ford Endeavour (India, 2003–2021)
- Production: 2003–present

Body and chassis
- Class: Mid-size SUV
- Body style: 5-door SUV
- Layout: Front-engine, rear-wheel-drive or four-wheel-drive
- Chassis: Body-on-frame
- Related: Ford Ranger

Chronology
- Predecessor: Ford Raider; Ford Territory (Australia)

The Ford Everest is a mid-size SUV produced by the Ford Motor Company since 2003. Developed and destined mainly for the Asia-Pacific region with production centered in Thailand, the first-generation Everest is derived from the Mazda-based Ford Ranger pickup truck, while the following generations are based on the globally-marketed T6 Ranger. Unlike the Ranger which was paralleled with the Mazda B series or BT-50 until 2020, the Everest has no Mazda equivalent, as it was seen as unfitting for the brand.

In India, the Everest was marketed as the Ford Endeavour to avoid legal issues due to the existence of a spice-making brand with the same name in the country.

== First generation (U268/UR; 2003) ==
First generation
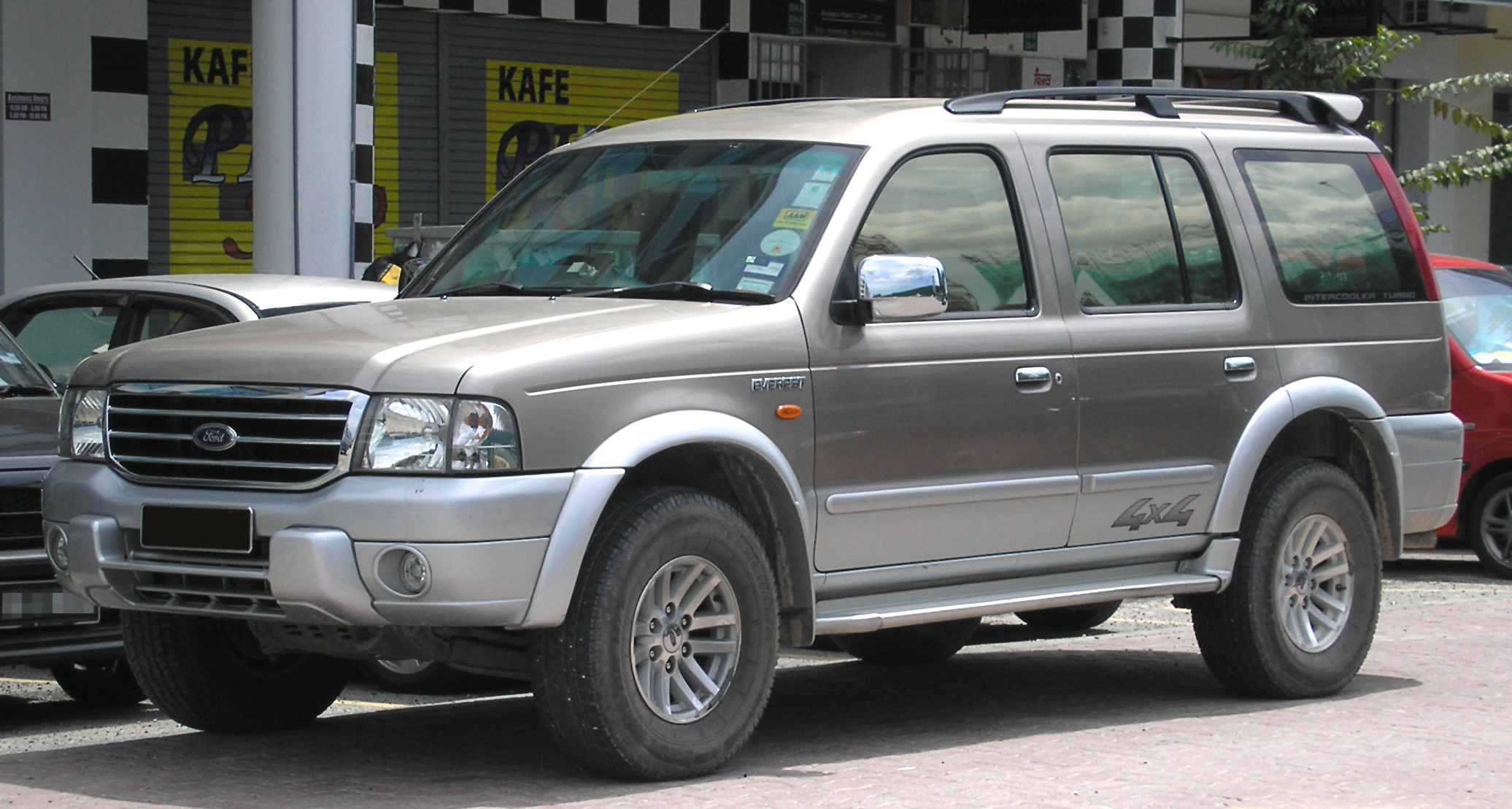

Overview
- Model code: U268; UR
- Also called: Ford Endeavour (India)
- Production: 2003–2015
- Assembly: Thailand: Rayong (AAT); Vietnam: Hải Dương (Ford Vietnam); India: Chennai (Ford India); Malaysia: Shah Alam, Selangor (AMIM)

Body and chassis
- Related: Ford Ranger (international)

Powertrain
- Engine: Petrol: 2.6 L G6E I4; Diesel: 2.5 L WL Duratorq I4; 2.5 L WL-T Duratorq I4 turbo; 3.0 L VS Duratorq I4 turbo
- Transmission: 5-speed manual 4-speed automatic 5-speed automatic

Dimensions
- Wheelbase: 2,860 mm (112.6 in)
- Length: 4,958–5,062 mm (195.2–199.3 in)
- Width: 1,788–1,806 mm (70.4–71.1 in)
- Height: 1,826–1,835 mm (71.9–72.2 in)
- Curb weight: 1,800–2,023 kg (3,968–4,460 lb)

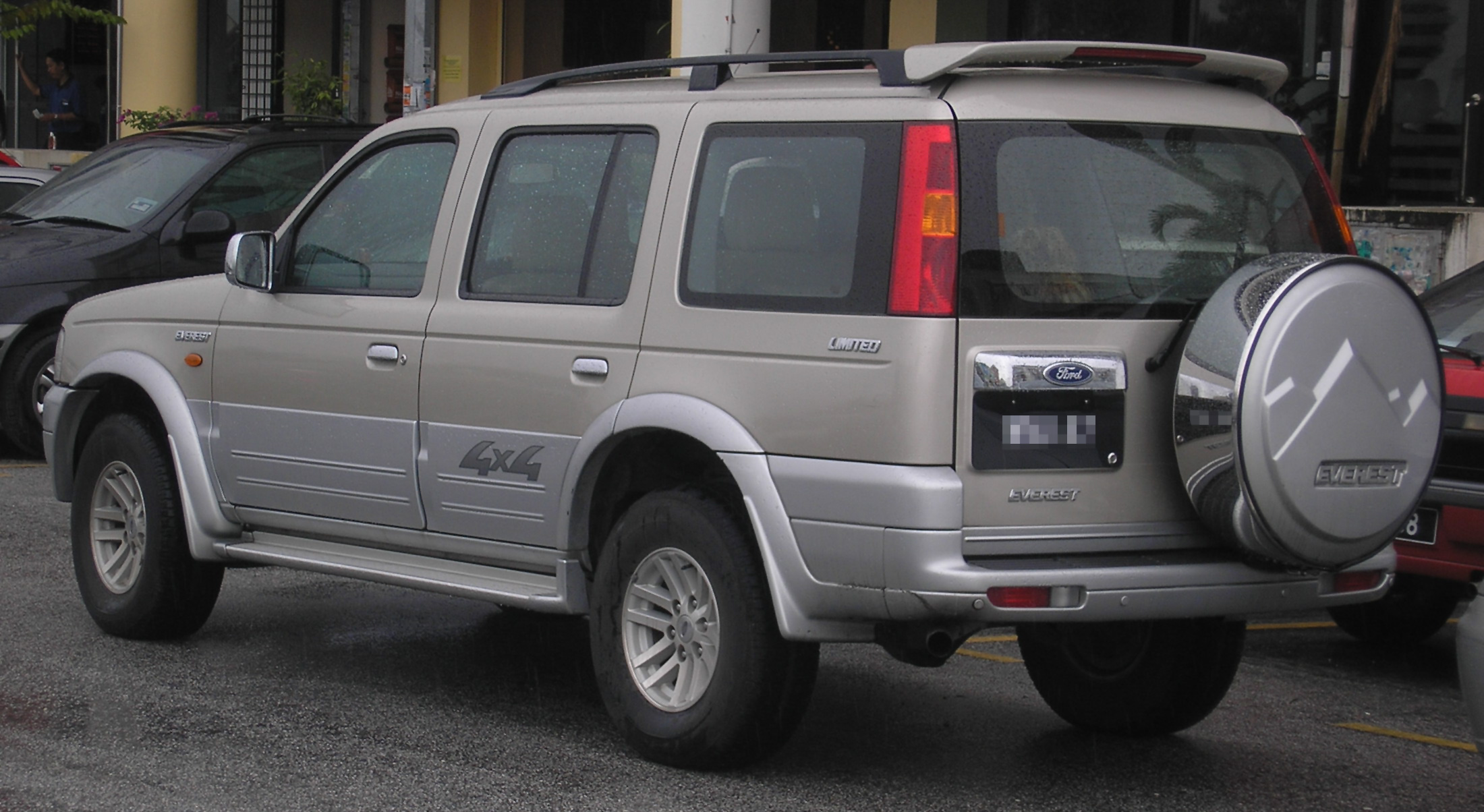
Rear view

Ford unveiled the first-generation Everest in January 2, 2003 at the 24th Bangkok International Motor Show. Developed specifically for Asian markets under the lead of chief platform engineer Masaki Makihara, the Everest shares 60 percent of the Ranger's components, including its 2.5-litre intercooled turbo-diesel engine and the exterior styling from the front to the B-pillars. It was revealed that the development of the car took four years and costs US$100 million including investments needed to manufacture the Everest.

As it is based on the Ranger, the Everest retained the double wishbone independent front suspension and a live axle with leaf spring rear suspension from the Ranger with several adjustments. It lacks a lockable rear differential.

The first-generation Everest was offered in a three-row, seven-seater configuration, while in some markets such as Indonesia it was also available as a 10-seater with face-to-face third row bench seats.

The Everest was sold in Southeast Asia, India, Middle East, Central America, the Bahamas and several African countries. It was built at the AutoAlliance Thailand plant in Rayong, and as CKD kits in Chengalpattu, India and Hai Duong, Vietnam. In India, the vehicle was launched as the Endeavour on 14 October 2003.

In February 28, 2006 The Ford Everest 1st Generation Pre-Facelift 2.5 TDI was already ended production, due to Launched Of the 1st Facelift 3.0 TDCI Starting In March 1, 2006 at Bangkok, Thailand.

=== Facelift ===
In March 2006, the Everest underwent a major facelift that saw the whole front and side body panels replaced to match the redesign of its base vehicle, the Ranger. Changes also included an updated front fascia, new transmission and an improved engine. In addition, the redesign featured the new 5-speed automatic transmission with BorgWarner transfer case, and an Active-Shift-on-the-Fly function (4x4 only) for the first time. Despite the massive changes, it retained most mechanical parts along with its U268 project code. However, the 2006–2015 model is sometimes referred to as the second-generation Everest by Ford or journalists. The first-generation facelifted Ford Everest with the 3.0L TDCi engine was launched in the Philippines since July 1, 2006 though exact day-specific local launch records pin general availability and media drives in mid-2006. In August 2006 Ford sold their 1st Facelift 3.0 TDCI 2nd Generation Everest In Jakatara Indonesia.

A second facelift was introduced in May 2009. While the changes were less prominent than the previous facelift, Everest now sports a rounder fascia than its predecessor and is similar to the facelifted Ranger. The changes were achieved by changing the front fender assembly, front hood, front headlights, front grille and front bumper, while it also featured larger 18-inch polished alloy wheels, a redesigned tailgate and new tail lamps.

Another smaller update was introduced in September 2012, now sporting a revised front grille. In August 2013, the Everest received a final facelift, featuring a redesigned front bumper in line with some other global Ford cars.

==== First facelift ====
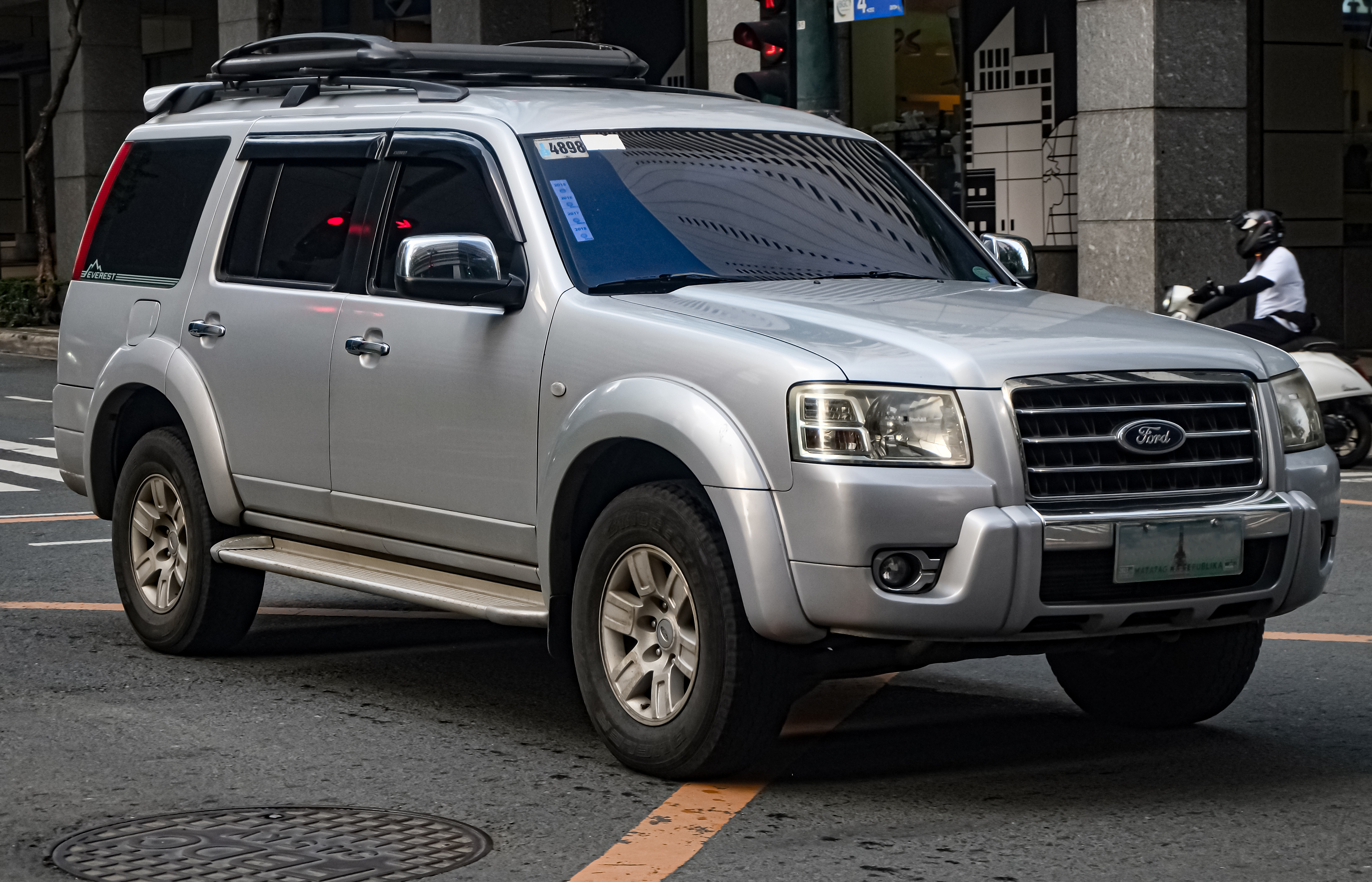
2006 Ford Everest (first facelift)

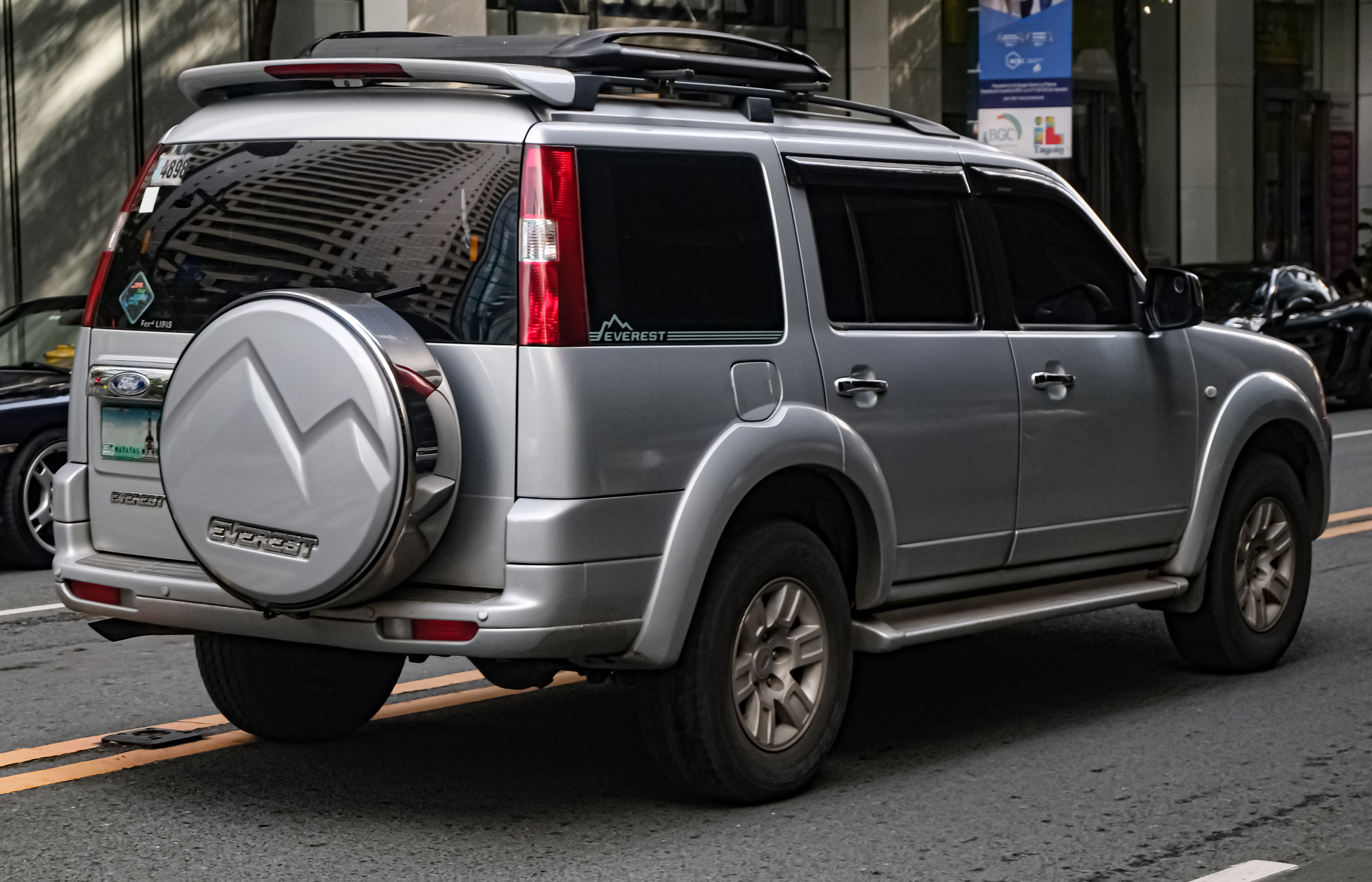
2006 Ford Everest (first facelift)

==== Second facelift ====
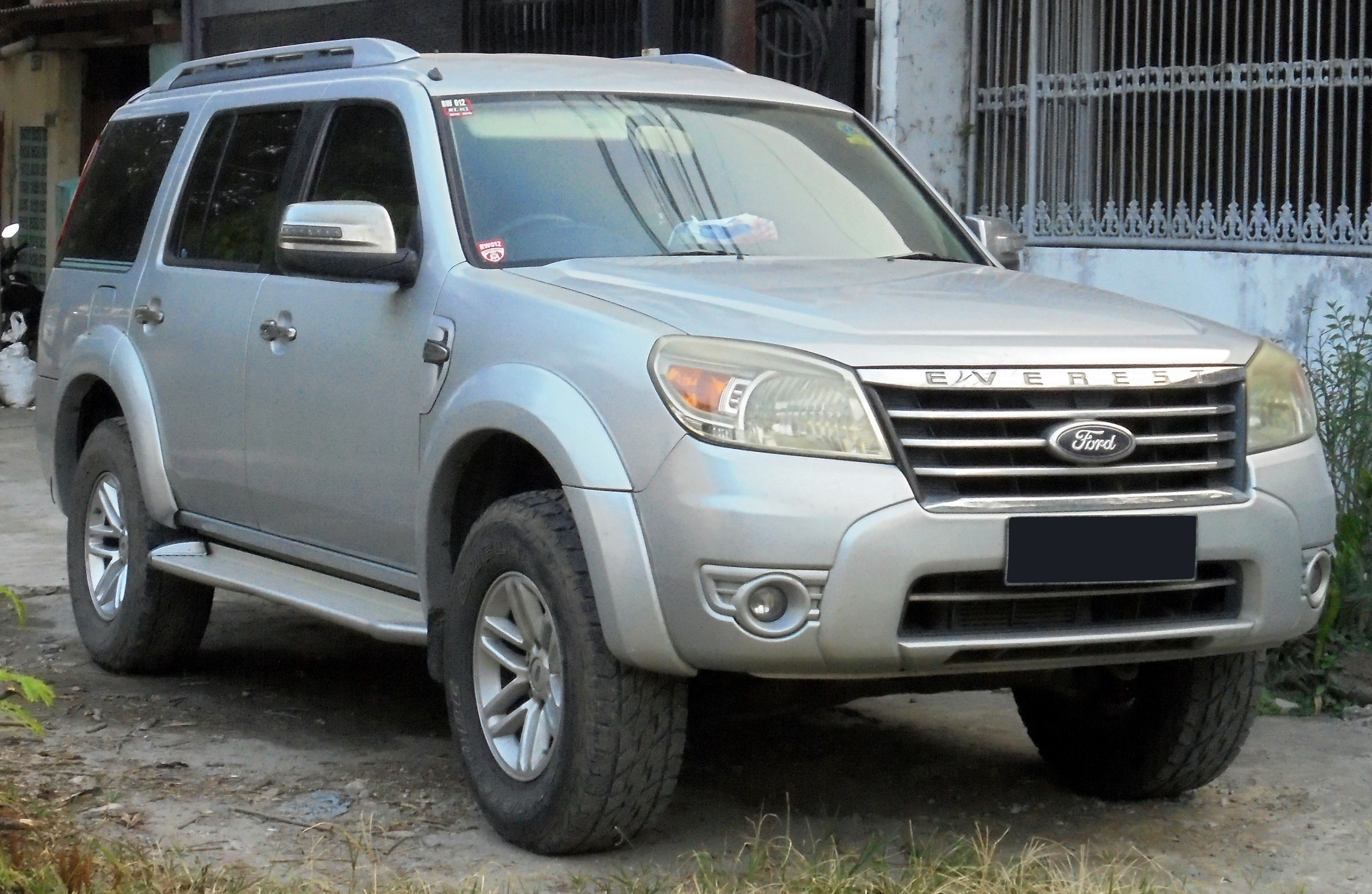
2010 Ford Everest (second facelift)

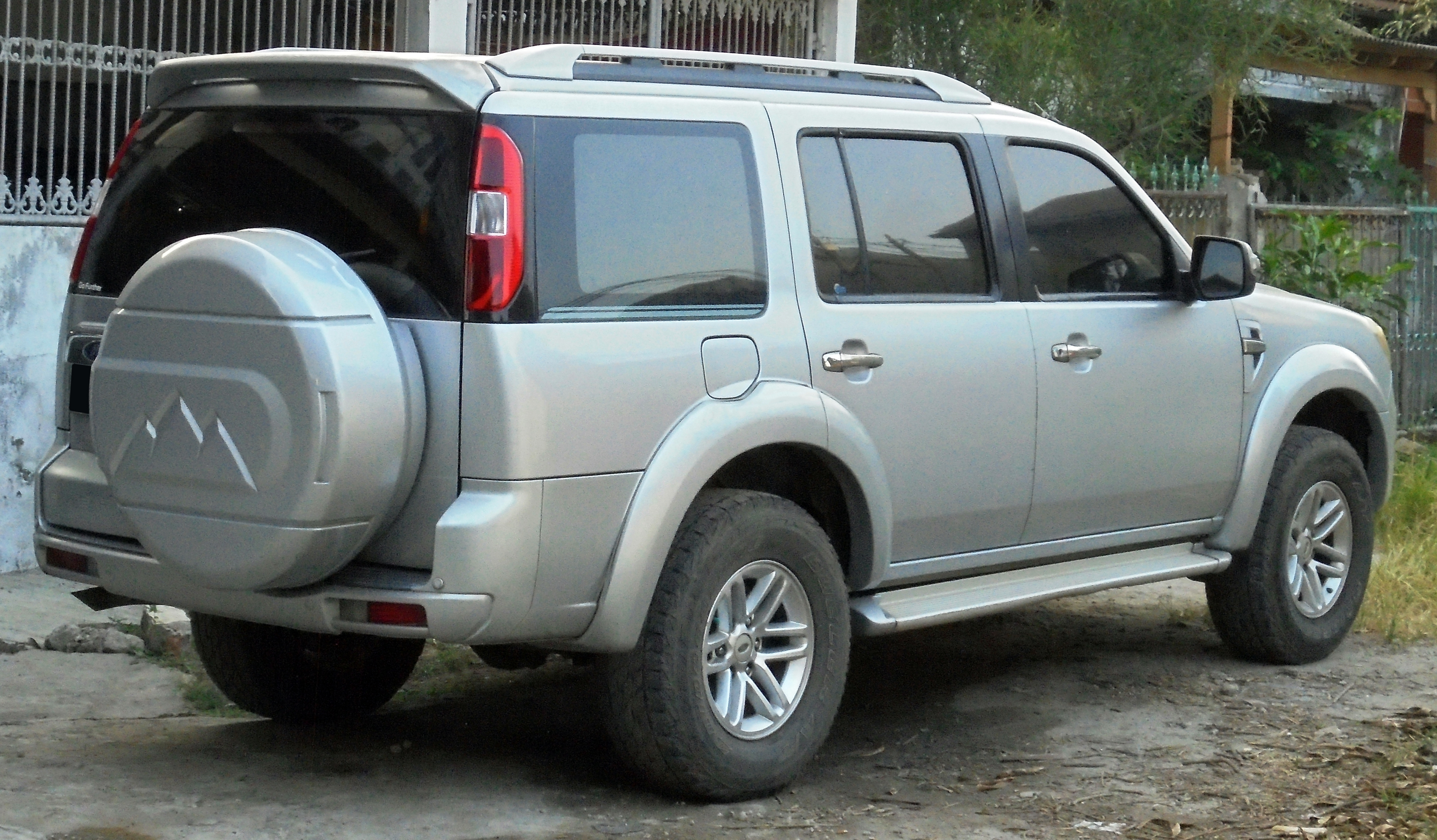
2010 Ford Everest (second facelift)

==== Third facelift ====
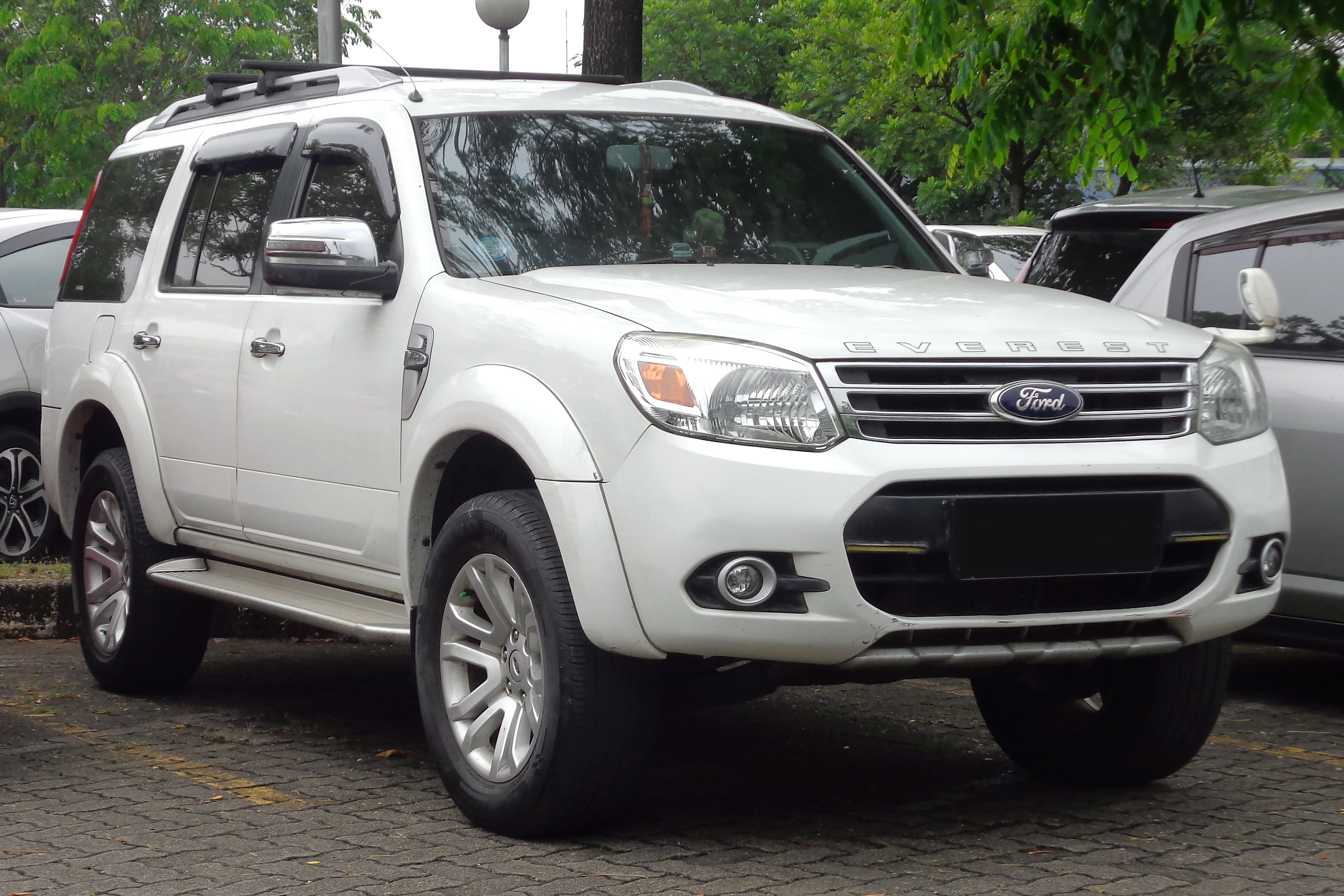
2014 Ford Everest (third facelift)

== Second generation (U375/UA; 2015) ==
Second generation
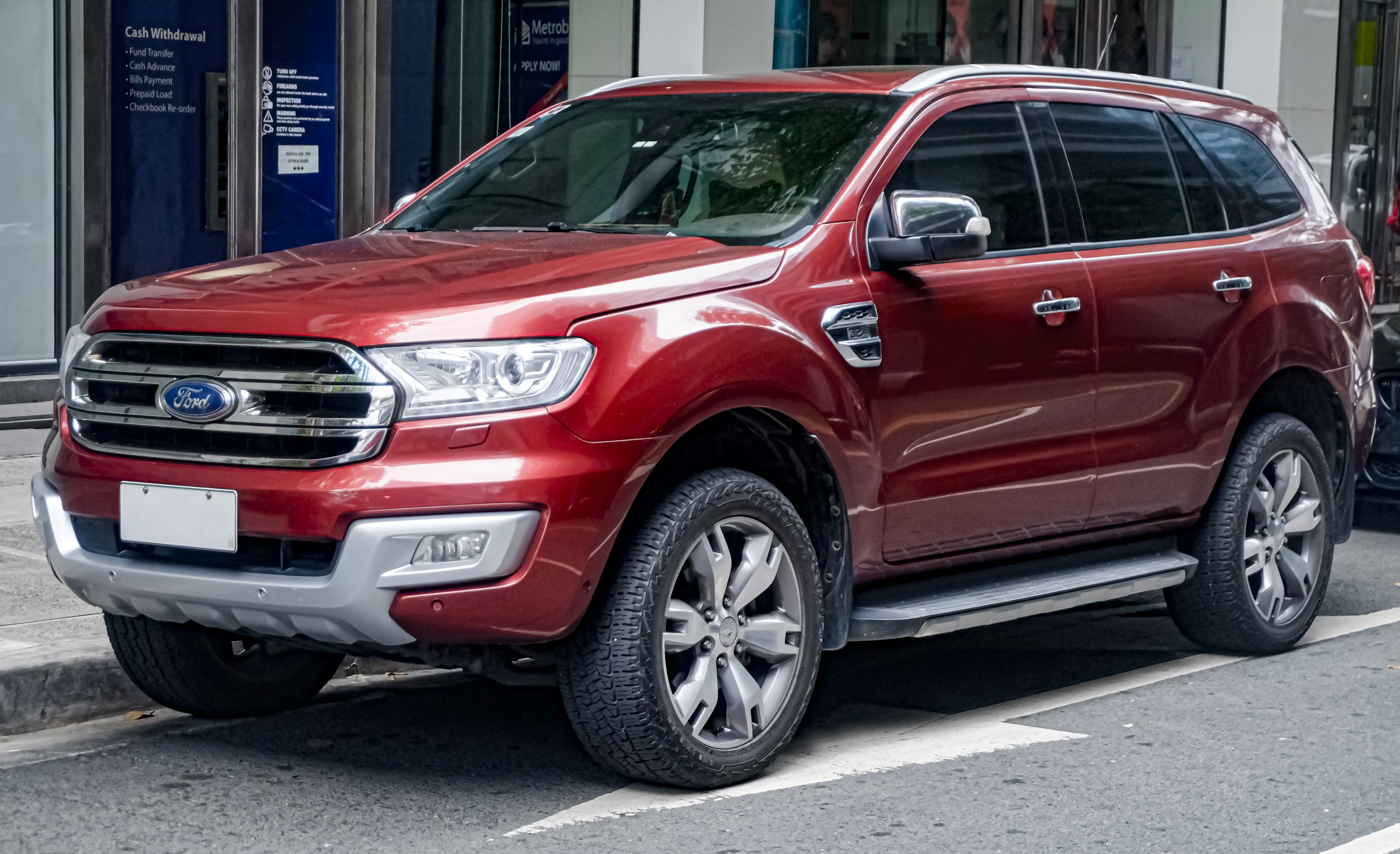
- Ford Everest Titanium (pre-facelift)

Overview
- Model code: U375; UA
- Also called: Ford Endeavour (India); ACMAT/Arquus Trapper VT4 (French military)
- Production: 2015–2022; 2016–2021 (India)
- Assembly: Thailand: Rayong (AAT); China: Nanchang (JMC-Ford); South Africa: Silverton, Pretoria (Ford South Africa); India: Chennai (Ford India); Cambodia: Pursat (Ford Cambodia)

Body and chassis
- Platform: Ford T6
- Related: Ford Ranger (P375)

Powertrain
- Engine: Petrol: 2.0 L EcoBoost I4 turbo; 2.3 L EcoBoost I4 turbo; Diesel: 2.0 L EcoBlue I4 turbo; 2.0 L EcoBlue I4 twin-turbo; 2.2 L Duratorq I4 turbo; 3.2 L Duratorq I5 turbo
- Transmission: 5-speed M5OD manual 6-speed Getrag MT-82 manual 5-speed 5R55E automatic 6-speed 6R80 automatic 10-speed 10R80 automatic

Dimensions
- Wheelbase: 2,850 mm (112.2 in)
- Length: 4,893–4,903 mm (192.6–193.0 in)
- Width: 1,862–1,869 mm (73.3–73.6 in)
- Height: 1,836 mm (72.3 in)
- Curb weight: 2,408 kg (5,308.7 lb)

Chronology
- Predecessor: Ford Territory (Australia and New Zealand)

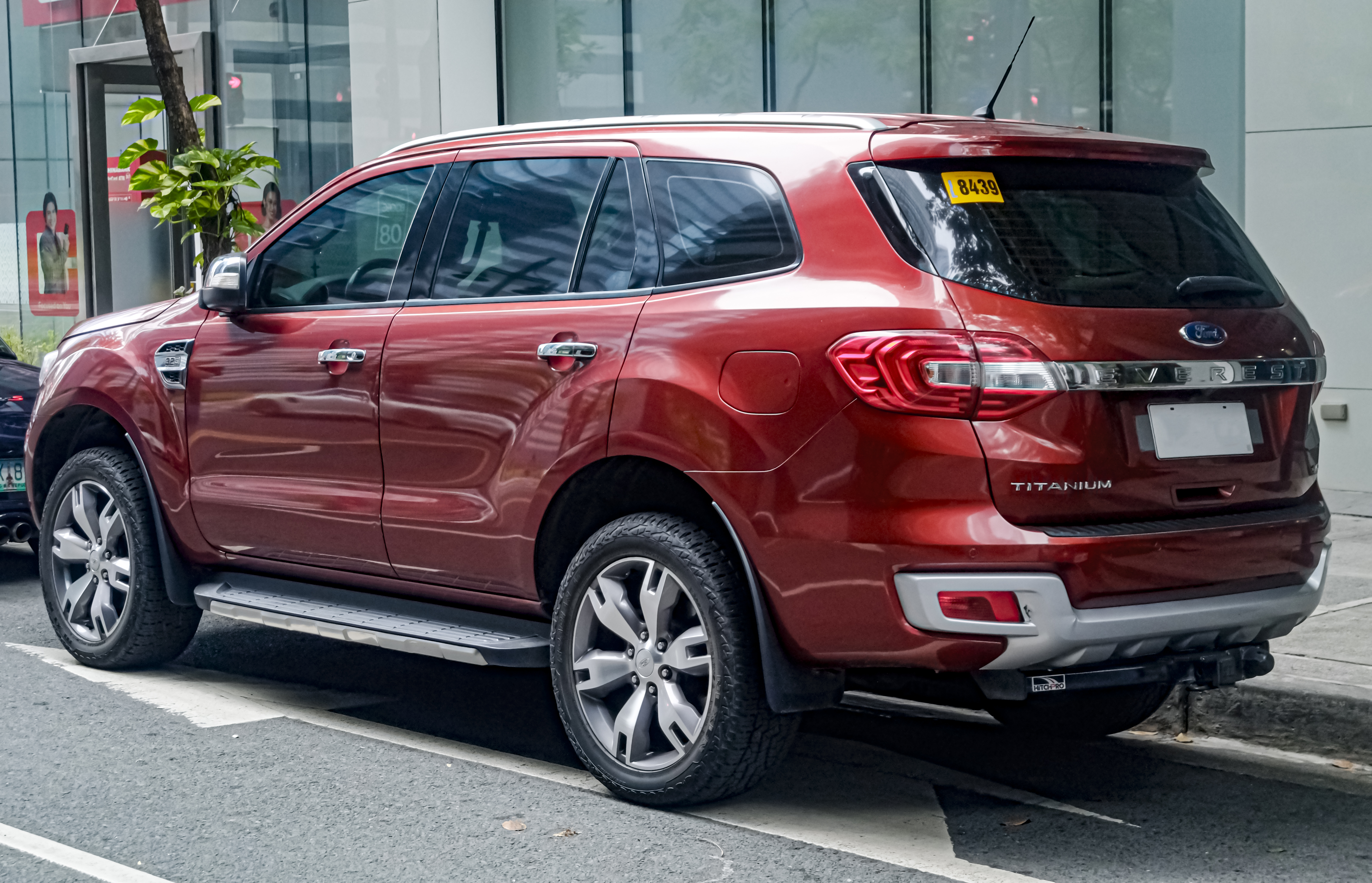
Rear

The second-generation Everest first previewed at a 'Go Further' future product event in Sydney, Australia as a near-production concept vehicle in August 2013. It was also showcased at the Bangkok Motor Show in March 2014, and as a production version November 2014 ahead of its public debut at the Guangzhou International Motor Show.

Based on the T6 Ranger, the vehicle was developed by Ford Australia under the lead of American chief program engineer Todd Hoevener. The development code was designated U375, and the model code in Australia was designated UA series. In China, the Everest was manufactured by the JMC-Ford joint venture, at JMC's Nanchang factory.

The second-generation Everest features a complete redesign which featured rounder proportions for a more modern appearance. Dimension-wise, the vehicle is shorter in length but wider and taller, altering its proportions compared to its predecessor. The wheelbase has been reduced from 2,860 mm (112.6 in) to 2,850 mm (112.2 in).

Production and sales of the Endeavour in India ended on 9 September 2021 due to the closure of all Ford manufacturing plants in the country. Attempts to continue its production in the country through a contractual basis fell through.

=== Facelift ===
This model received a facelift in May 2018, coinciding with the Ranger facelift. The facelift included design tweaks, equipment list update, new 2.0-litre bi-turbo diesel engine and 10-speed automatic gearbox. Other changes include Autonomous Emergency Braking, a standard kick-activated power liftgate, and new alloy wheels. Interior changes include more soft touch materials such as ebony dark colour scheme. Another facelift was released for the 2021 year model in November 2020 in Thailand.

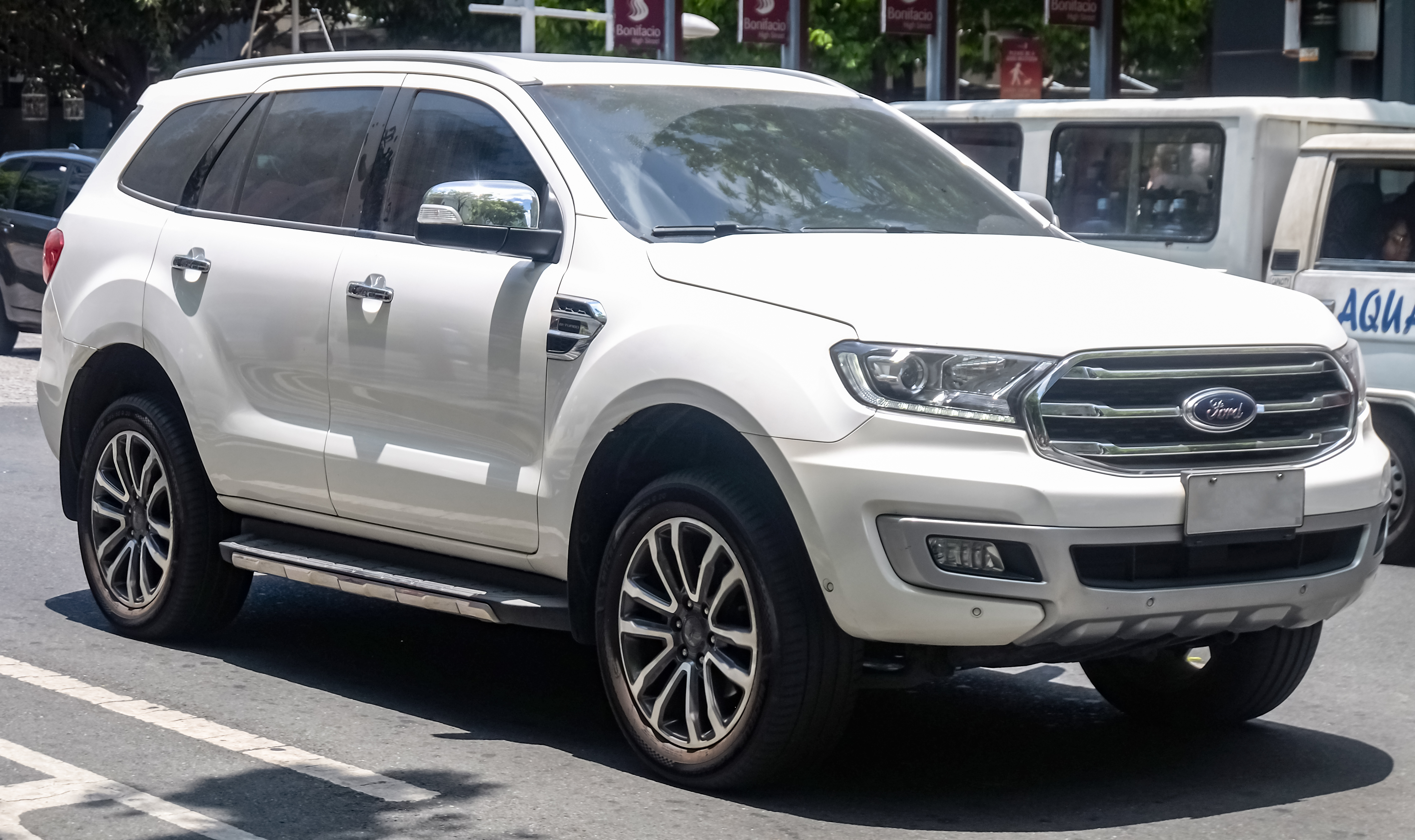
Ford Everest Titanium (facelift)

=== Arquus Trapper VT4 ===
The second-generation Everest is used as a basis for a light-duty tactical vehicle for the French military, called the Arquus Trapper VT4. On 15 September 2022, Arquus announced the production of the 4,000th model. On 3 August 2023, all VT4s were delivered to the French military.

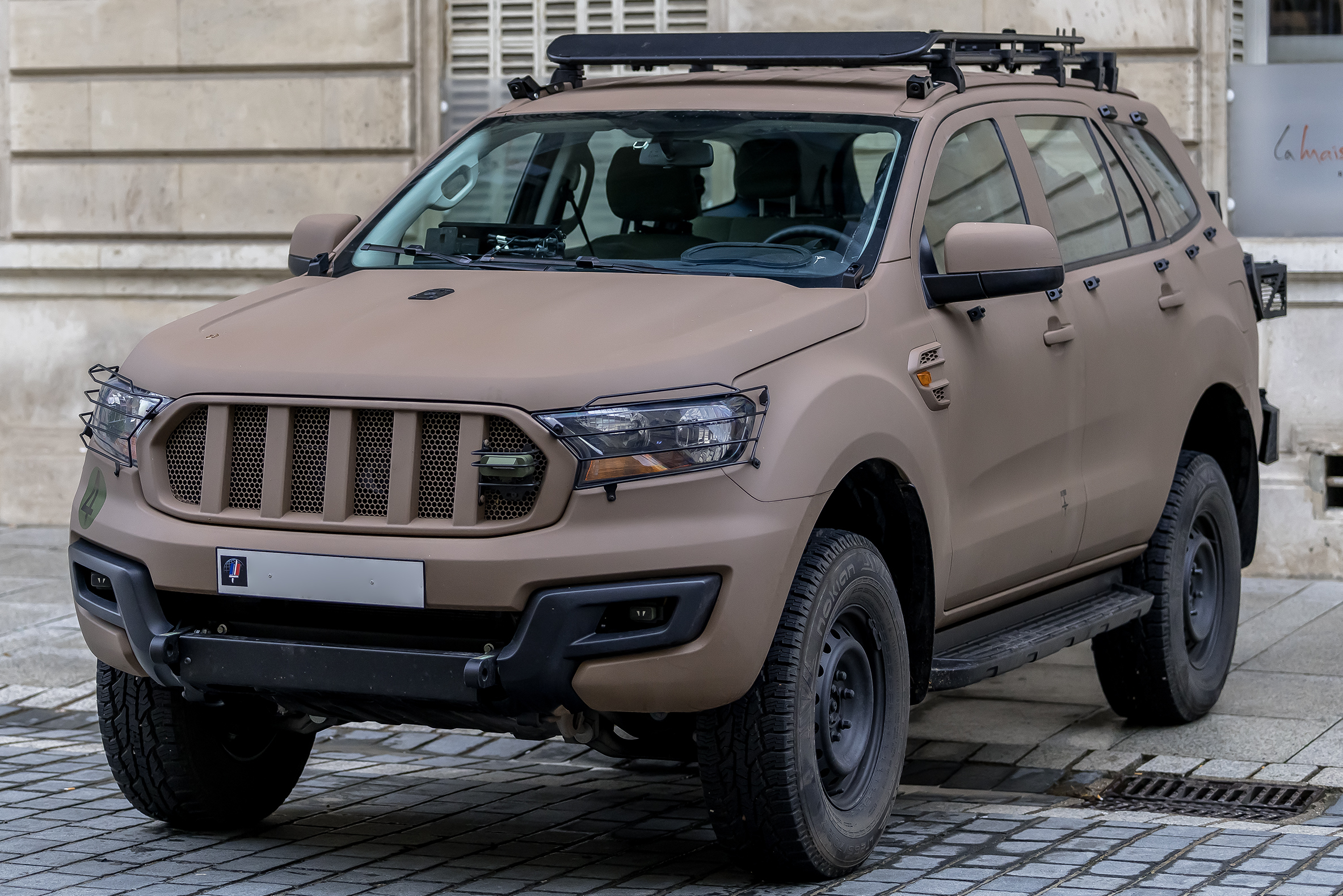
Arquus Trapper VT4

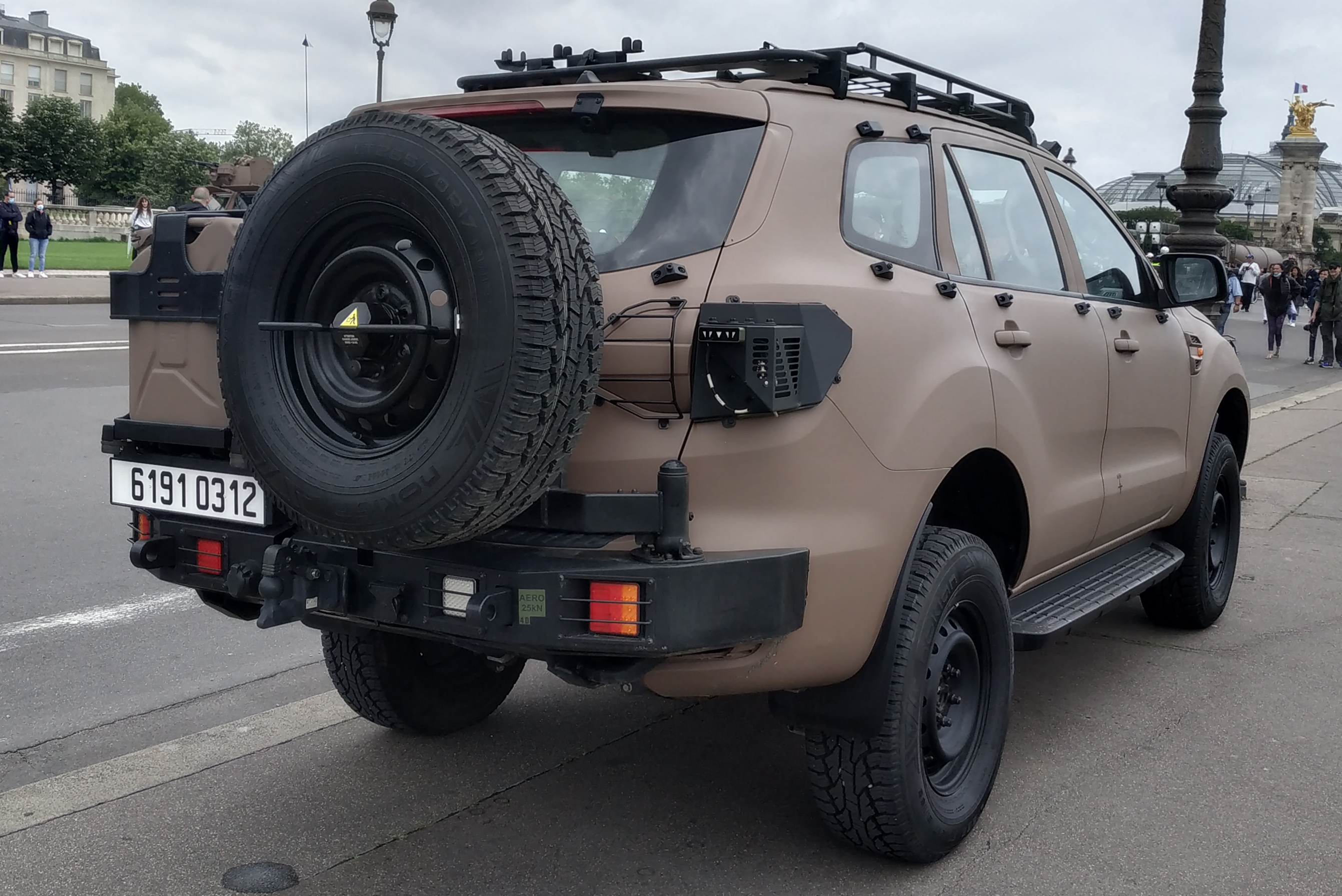
Arquus Trapper VT4

=== Safety ===
ANCAP test results* Ford Everest (2015)
Test	Score
Overall	5 /5 stars
Frontal offset	15.38/16
Side impact	16/16
Pole	2/2
Seat belt reminders	2.6/3
Whiplash protection	Good
Pedestrian protection	Adequate
Electronic stability control	Standard

ASEAN NCAP test results Ford Everest I5 3.2L Trend (2015)
Test	Points	Stars
Adult occupant:	15.38	5 /5 stars
Child occupant:	81%	4 /5 stars
Safety assist:	NA	

== Third generation (U704/UB; 2022) ==
Third generation
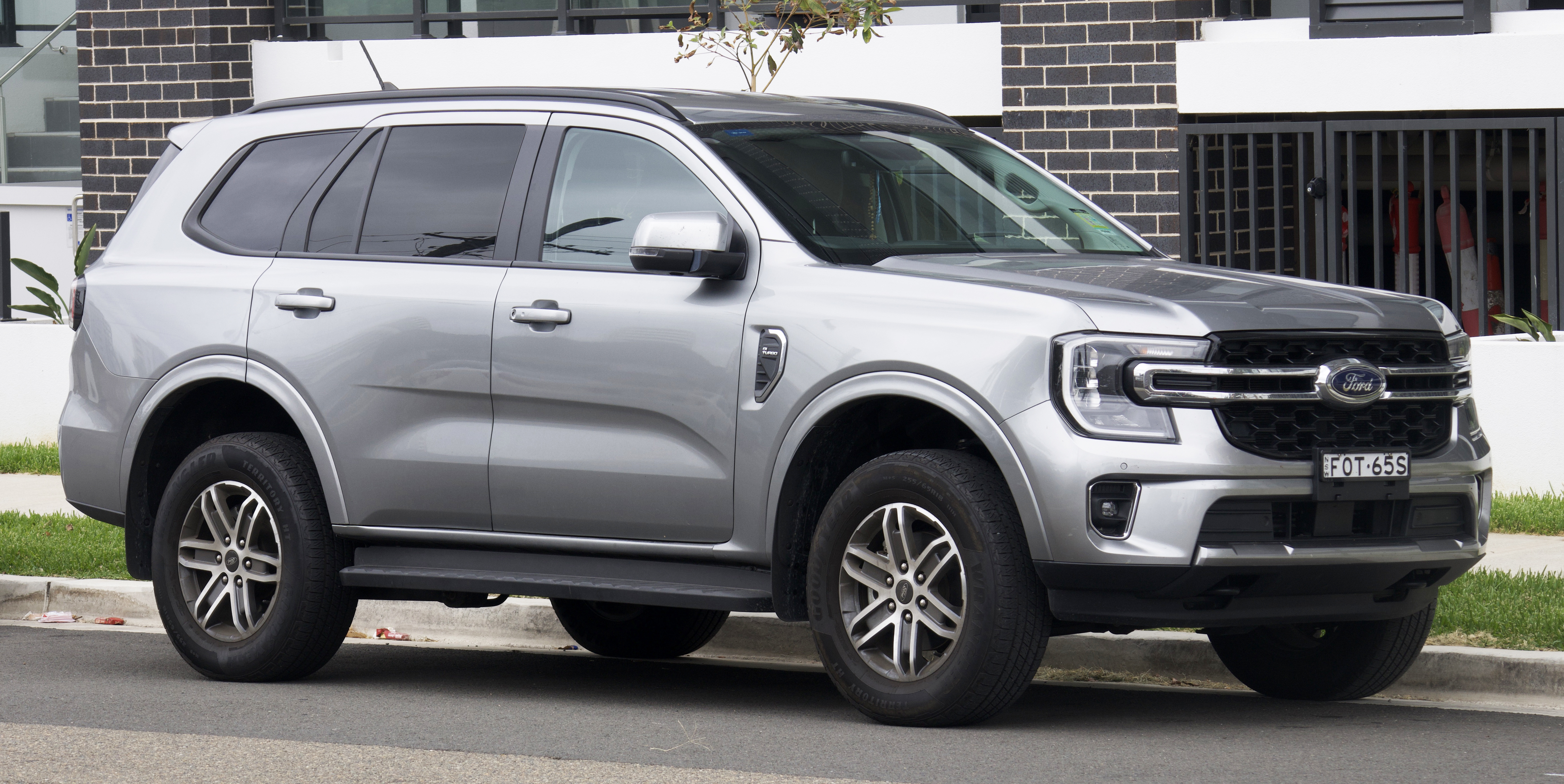
- Ford Everest Trend

Overview
- Model code: U704; UB
- Production: 2022–present
- Assembly: Thailand: Rayong (AAT); Cambodia: Pursat (Ford Cambodia)

Body and chassis
- Platform: Ford T6
- Related: Ford Ranger (P703); Volkswagen Amarok Mk2

Powertrain
- Engine: Petrol: 2.3 L EcoBoost turbo I4; 2.7 L EcoBoost twin-turbo V6; Diesel: 2.0 L EcoBlue turbo I4; 2.0 L EcoBlue twin-turbo I4; 3.0 L Power Stroke turbo V6
- Transmission: 6-speed 6R80 automatic; 10-speed 10R80 automatic

Dimensions
- Wheelbase: 2,900 mm (114.2 in)
- Length: 4,914 mm (193.5 in)
- Width: 1,923 mm (75.7 in)
- Height: 1,842 mm (72.5 in)

The third-generation Everest was revealed on 1 March 2022. It was developed by Ford Australia under the U704 development code, also known as the UB series. Sharing most of the front end components with the P703 Ranger, overall dimensions of the third-generation Everest remain mostly the same, with an additional 50 mm (2.0 in) in wheel track and wheelbase. The changes was done to achieve a longer dash-to-axle ratio to accommodate the optional V6 engine and a slightly wider wheel track.

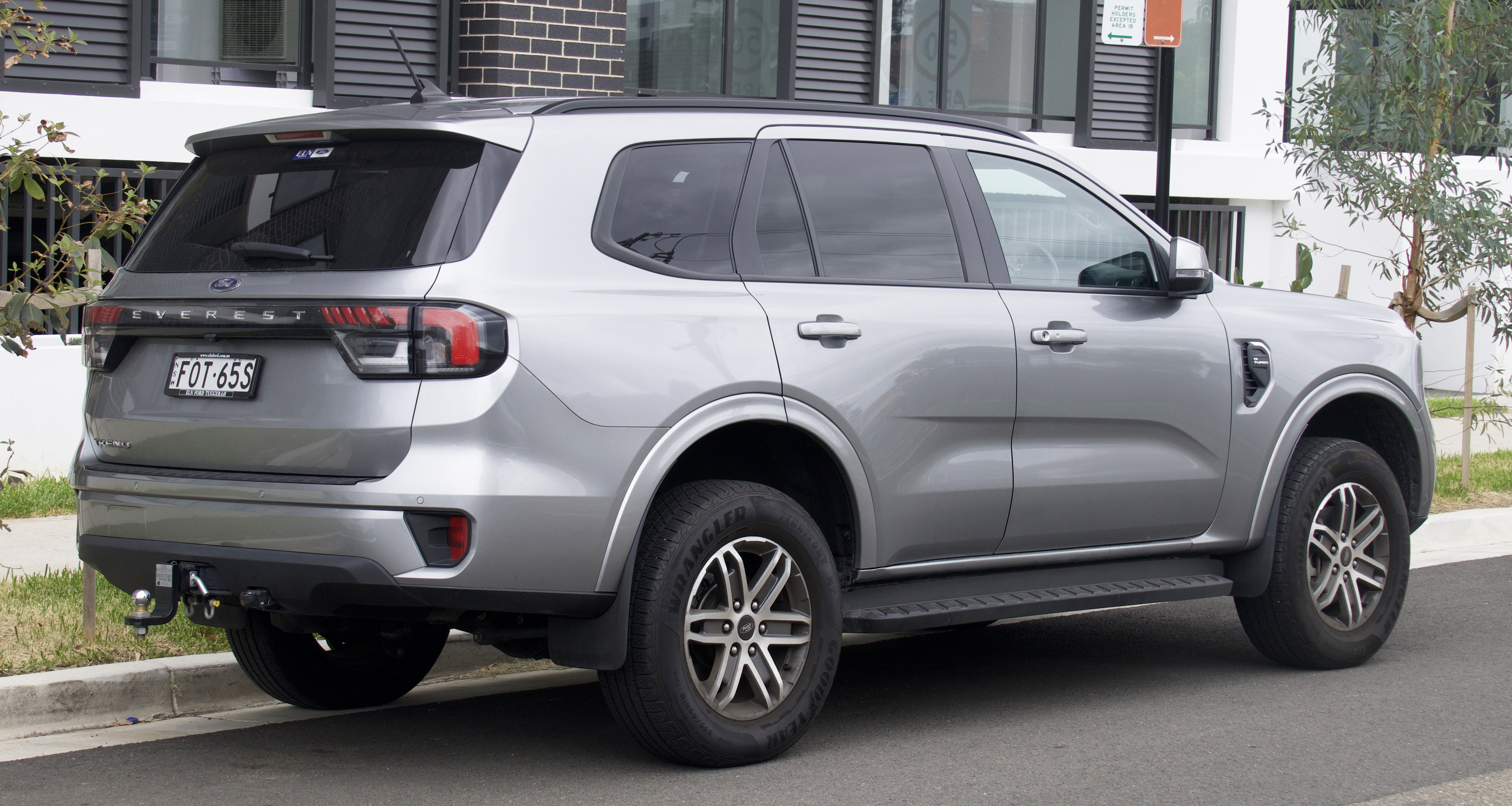
Rear view

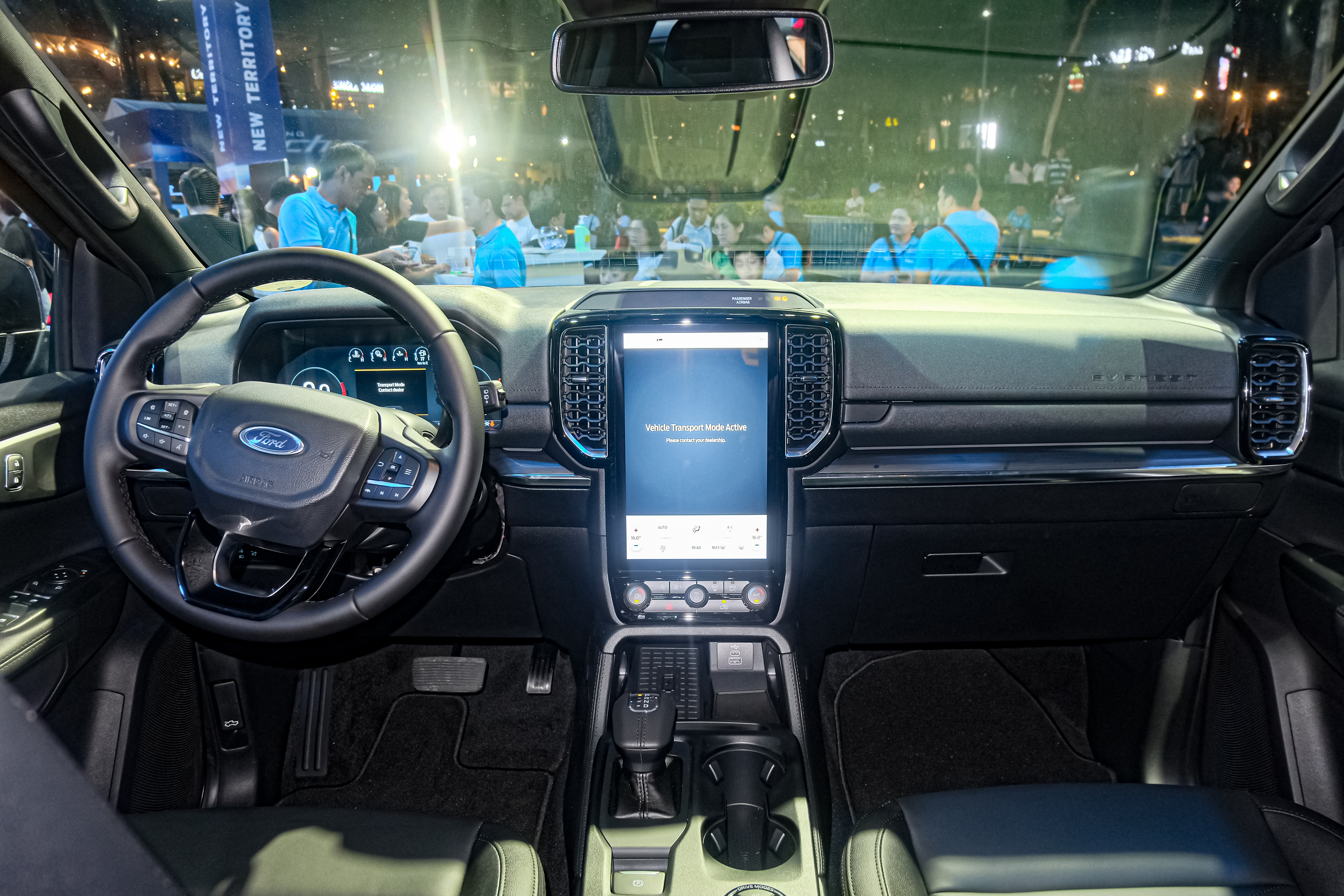
Interior

The T6 platform continues to underpin the Everest with upgrades, such as longer control arms for the independent front suspension and Watts' link rear suspension to suit the wider wheel track. All Everest models in this generation are equipped with underbody protection, a rear locking differential, selectable off-road drive modes, and two functional tow hooks at the front. The vehicle also offers 800 mm (31.5 in) of wading depth.

The four-wheel-drive model is available with the option of 3.0-litre turbo-diesel V6 and 3,500 kg (7,716 lb) towing capacity. To accommodate the increased towing capacity, Ford worked on the engine cooling package, stiffened the frame and increased the front and rear axle load capacities.

Instead of using a more conventional centre differential with a limited-slip or locking function for off-road driving, the Everest uses an electromechanical clutch pack that would connect and disconnect the front and rear wheels. It allows the Everest to operate in rear-wheel drive on high traction surfaces, and move the front wheels if needed. The clutch pack can engage completely in off-road situations.

=== Markets ===
==== Middle East ====
The third-generation Everest was released in the Middle Eastern markets on 10 October 2023, it is powered by a 2.3-litre EcoBoost turbo-petrol engine paired to a 10-speed automatic transmission. It is offered in three grades: XLS, XLT, and Limited.

At the 2025 Liwa International Festival, the Middle Eastern version of the Everest Tremor was revealed. Unlike the Everest Tremor sold in Australia, the Middle Eastern version uses a 2.7-litre twin-turbocharged petrol engine from the Ford F-150 and the North American version of the P703 Ford Ranger. It produces 310 horsepower (231 kW; 314 PS) and 400 pound force-feet (542 N⋅m) of torque. It comes with four-wheel drive as standard and uses the same 10-speed automatic as Australia's Everest Tremor. The 2.7-litre version of the Everest Tremor will be exclusive to the Middle East.

==== Oceania ====
===== Australia =====
The third-generation Everest went on sale in Australia on 12 May 2022, with four trim levels available at launch: Ambiente, Trend, Sport and Platinum. For engines, the Ambiente and Trend trims use the 2.0-litre EcoBlue bi-turbo engine, while the Sport and Platinum trims use the 3.0-litre V6 turbo-diesel engine. Four-wheel drive is an option for Ambiente and Trend trims which both trims comes standard with two-wheel drive, while the Sport and Platinum trims comes standard with four-wheel drive. The Everest was awarded Wheels Car of the Year in 2022, the first Ford vehicle to win Australia's most prestigious new car award since the SX Territory in 2004. In October 2022, the Sport 4x2 variant was added to the line-up. In May 2023, the Wildtrak model using the 3.0-litre V6 turbo-diesel engine (4x4) was added to the line-up. In January 2024, the Trend 4x2 variant was removed from the line-up. In August 2024, the off-road focused Tremor model using the 3.0-litre V6 turbo-diesel engine (4x4) was introduced in Australia. In August 2025, the two-wheel drive (4x2) Everest variants were discontinued, due to the New Vehicle Efficiency Standard (NVES) regulations and the two-wheel drive (4x2) variants are categorised as passenger vehicles (Type 1 vehicles) under the regulations which are subjected to more stringent restrictions. In September 2025, the limited edition Sport Bi-Turbo variant using the 2.0-litre EcoBlue bi-turbo engine was made available limited to 700 units. In November 2025, the 2.0-litre EcoBlue bi-turbo was replaced by the single-turbo unit as the base engine option, the 3.0-litre V6 turbo-diesel engine was made available for all trims, and the introduction of the entry-level Active trim replaced both the Ambiente and Trend trims. In April 2026, the Wildtrak model using the 3.0-litre V6 turbo-diesel engine (4x4), features orange exterior accents, return to the line-up limited to 1,000 units.

===== New Zealand =====
The third-generation Everest was launched in New Zealand in September 2022, with three trim levels: Trend, Sport and Platinum. For engines, the Trend use the 2.0-litre EcoBlue bi-turbo engine, while the Sport and Platinum use the 3.0-litre V6 turbo-diesel engine, and all variants are four-wheel drive.

==== South Africa ====
The third-generation Everest was launched in South Africa on 28 September 2022, with two trim levels available at launch: Sport and Platinum. For engines, the Sport use the 2.0-litre EcoBlue bi-turbo engine, while the Platinum use the 3.0-litre V6 turbo-diesel engine, and both variants are four-wheel drive. In May 2023, the entry-level XLT and flagship Wildtrak trims were added to the line-up along with the introduction of two-wheel drive variants, therefore the number of available variants was increased from two to six. In July 2024, an armoured version of the Everest produced by SVI Engineering, went on sale available to both corporate and private clients, in two variants corresponding to the level of in-car protection. In May 2026, the 2.0-litre Ecoblue single-turbo engine was upgraded and became paired with a 10-speed automatic, the 2.0-litre Ecoblue bi-turbo engine was discontinued, the 2.3-litre EcoBoost turbo petrol engine was introduced for the Sport trim, the 3.0-litre V6 turbo-diesel engine was made available for the Sport trim, and a new Active trim replaced the XLT as the entry-level trim.

==== Southeast Asia ====
===== Indonesia =====
The third-generation Everest was launched in Indonesia by importer RMA Indonesia on 8 June 2023 alongside the Ranger (T6). It is available in two trim levels: XLT and Titanium, both variants are powered by the 2.0-litre EcoBlue bi-turbo engine and four-wheel drive. In April 2025, the Sport model, equipped with exclusive black exterior accents and uses the 2.0-litre EcoBlue single-turbo engine (2WD), was added to the line-up. In July 2026, the Platinum model using the 3.0-litre V6 turbo-diesel engine (4WD) was introduced as the flagship variant.

===== Malaysia =====
The third-generation Everest was launched in Malaysia on 24 September 2022, with three variants available at launch: 2WD Sport, 4WD Trend and 4WD Titanium. For engines, the Sport variant use the 2.0-litre EcoBlue single-turbo engine, while the Trend and Titanium variants use the 2.0-litre EcoBlue bi-turbo engine. In November 2023, the Wildtrak model using the 2.0-litre EcoBlue bi-turbo engine (4WD) was added to the line-up. In June 2026, the Platinum model using 3.0 V6 turbo diesel and 2.0 turbo diesel engine was added to the line-up.

===== Philippines =====
The third-generation Everest was launched in the Philippines on 28 July 2022 alongside the Ranger (T6). At launch, it was available with five variants: Trend 4x2, Limited 4x2, Sport 4x2, Titanium+ 4x2 and Titanium+ 4x4. For engines, all variants use the 2.0-litre EcoBlue single-turbo engine, while the range-topping Titanium+ 4x4 variant use the 2.0-litre EcoBlue bi-turbo engine. In August 2023, the Everest Wildtrak model using the 2.0-litre EcoBlue single-turbo engine (4x2) was available as a limited edition variant. In May 2025, the Sport Special Edition (4x2) was added to the line-up. In September 2025, the Everest Wildtrak model return to the line-up as a permanent model using either 2.0-litre EcoBlue single-turbo (4x2) and bi-turbo (4x4) engines, but was briefly discontinued in May 2026. In July 2026, the limited edition Titanium+ 4x4 model equipped with powered side steps was made available

In September 2026, the Everest line-up was updated in the Philippines with four variants: Active (4x2), Sport (4x2), Wildtrak (4x4) and Platinum (4x4). The update saw the introduction of the 3.0-litre V6 turbo-diesel engine for the flagship Platinum variant, with other variants receiving the 2.0-litre EcoBlue single-turbo engine.

===== Thailand =====
The third-generation Everest was launched in Thailand on 21 March 2022 alongside the Ranger (T6). At launch, it was available with two variants: 2.0 Turbo Sport 2WD and 2.0 Bi-Turbo Titanium+ 4WD. During the 43rd Bangkok International Motor Show, the Everest received a total of 914 bookings. In July 2022, two variants were added: 2.0 Trend 2WD and 2.0 Bi-Turbo Titanium+ 2WD. In March 2023, the Wildtrak model using the 2.0-litre EcoBlue bi-turbo engine (4WD) was added to the line-up. In March 2024, the Platinum model using the 3.0-litre V6 turbo-diesel engine (4WD) was added to the line-up. In August 2024, the Sport (2WD) model, equipped with the Adventure Pack and Driving Assistance Technology Package, was added to the line-up. In March 2025, Sport Special Edition (2WD) variant, equipped with additional special exterior and interior decorations from the Sport model, was added to the line-up. In March 2026, the Platinum model became available with the 2.0-litre EcoBlue bi-turbo engine (4WD).

===== Vietnam =====
The third-generation Everest was launched in Vietnam on 1 July 2022, with four trim levels available at launch: Ambiente, Sport, Titanium and Titanium Plus. For engines, all trims use the 2.0-litre EcoBlue single-turbo engine and two-wheel drive except for the Titanium Plus, while the Titanium Plus trim uses the 2.0-litre EcoBlue bi-turbo engine and four-wheel drive. In May 2023, the Wildtrak model using the 2.0-litre EcoBlue bi-turbo engine (4WD) was added to the line-up. The Platinum model using the 2.0-litre EcoBlue bi-turbo engine (2WD) was added to the line-up. In April 2025, the Sport Special Edition (2WD) variant was added to the line-up.

In May 2026, the Everest line-up was updated in Vietnam with five variants: Active (4x2), Sport (4x2), Platinum (4x2), Platinum (4x4) and Platinum+ (4x4). The update saw the introduction of the 2.3-litre EcoBoost turbo-petrol engine for the flagship Platinum+ variant.

=== Safety ===
ANCAP test results* Ford Everest all variants excluding Tremor (2018, aligned with Euro NCAP)
Test	Points	%
Overall:	5 /5 stars	
Adult occupant:	32.99	86%
Child occupant:	45.66	93%
Pedestrian:	39.96	74%
Safety assist:	13.89	86%

== Sales ==
Year	Thailand	India	Philippines	Vietnam	Australia	South Africa	Indonesia
2003							392
2004							1,489
2005							1,492
2006							649
2007							1,627
2008							1,870
2009							1,334
2010							1,197
2011		3,003					1,520
2012		1,510					1,212
2013		788					959
2014	201	249				291	480
2015	4,967	10			1,245	543	202
2016	7,011	6,564		685	3,614	2,128	—N/a (Note: Official sales and imports were halted in 2016 following the closure of PT Ford Motor Indonesia, before the model line officially returned to the market in 2022.)
2017	8,131	6,286		2,205	4,607	5,751	—N/a
2018	9,628	6,244		1,009	5,482	4,793	—N/a
2019	6,355	6,787	4,165	6,317	5,333	3,544	—N/a
2020	5,349	5,484	1,522	4,810	5,996	1,588	—N/a
2021	5,057	6,317	1,772	5,485	8,359	2,372	—N/a
2022	9,767			6,979	10,314	1,256	N/A
2023	12,037		8,569	9,960	15,071	3,113	N/A
2024	8,128		8,538	10,841	26,494	3,109	497
2025	7,110			13,056	26,161		426
