= New Vehicle Efficiency Standard Act 2024 =

2024 Australian legislation

Parliament of Australia
- Long title: An Act to establish a vehicle efficiency standard, and for related purposes
- Territorial extent: Australia
- Enacted by: House of Representatives
- Enacted by: Senate
- Assented to by: Governor-General; David Hurley
- Assented to: 31 May 2024
- Commenced: 1 January 2025

Legislative history

Initiating chamber: House of Representatives
- Bill title: New Vehicle Efficiency Standard Bill 2024
- Introduced by: Catherine King

Final stages
- Finally passed both chambers: 16 May 2024

Amends
- Clean Energy Regular Act 2011; Road Vehicle Standards Act 2018

Summary
- sets CO_{2} emission limits for vehicles
- Status: Current legislation

The New Vehicle Efficiency Standard Act 2024 (NVES) is an Australian act of parliament that imposes emissions limits on vehicles. The law was implemented on 1 January 2025, with it coming into effect on 1 July 2025.

Companies are fined A$50 (increasing to $100 if unpaid) for every gram of carbon dioxide per kilometre (g/km of CO_{2}) average over the limit and credits for every g/km of CO_{2} under the limit. Credits can be sold to other companies or be banked for future years. Vehicles with a gross vehicle mass over 3.5 tonnes are exempt from the bill.

Fines will be first issued in 2028, for the 2025 reporting period, called interim emissions value (IEV) which ran from 1 July to 31 December 2025. The results of the 2025 IEV will be publicised in February 2026.

The bill has two classifications of vehicles with emission targets. Type 1 vehicles: passenger cars and SUVs. Type 2 vehicles: light commercial vehicles, such as utes and vans. SUVs can count as a Type 2 vehicle if they are built with four wheel drive with a body on frame construction, and have three tonnes braked towing capacity.

The Australian Design Rule ADR 114/00 will require some light-duty vehicles between 3.5 tonnes and 3,855kg to have their emissions tested. A discussion on whether the vehicles tested should be subject to NVES was closed on 20 July 2026, the results of the discussion are yet to be announced as of September 2026.

== Emission targets ==
The emission targets are adjusted based on the weight of the vehicle, with all fluids and a fuel tank of fuel. Pinned to a reference mass for Type 1 and Type 2 vehicles, the limit of CO_{2} lower if the vehicle is lighter and are higher if the vehicle is heavier. As of 2025 Type 1 vehicles have a slope of 0.0663 with a reference mass of 1,723kg and Type 2 vehicles have a slope of 0.0324 and a reference mass of 2,155kg.

NVES g/km of CO_{2}
Year	Type 1 vehicles	Type 2 vehicles
2025	141	210
2026	117	180
2027	92	150
2028	68	122
2029	58	110

== Reactions ==
In 2025, Ford Australia and Isuzu dropped their 4×2 variants of their Ford Everest and Isuzu MU-X SUVs in Australia due to not meeting emissions requirements for passenger vehicles. In 2026, Kia discontinued the 3.5 liter V6 petrol engine powered versions of the Kia Carnival MPV and Kia Sorento SUV models in Australia as the engine is unable to be modified to meet 2024 NVES regulations mandated on all new passenger vehicles sold in Australia from 2026.

Ford cited NVES as a reason for the raised price of the Mustang and Ranger in 2025, and stated that a broad range of cars will help the company hit the targets, including the introduction of the Bronco Basecamp extended-range electric vehicle and Transit City electric vehicle.

In July 2026 the Chevrolet Silverado increased the GVM of the vehicle, classifying it as a NB1 vehicle and using an off-road clause to avoid Australian Design Rules around automated emergency braking systems, the increase of GVM also excepted it from NVES. The Ford Ranger Super Duty is also except from NVES due to its weight of 4.5 tonnes, with Ford stating it was a coincidence. The Nissan Patrol Y63 has a GVM of 3,550 kg (7,826 lb) to avoid NVES fines, raised by 50 kg (110 lb) from the previous generation.

The Federal Chamber of Automotive Industries (FCAI) criticised NVES, including the claim that NVES would cause the prices of cars to increase. Tesla and Polestar both quit the FCAI in March 2024 for the comments. In September 2026 the Liberal–National Coalition announced a policy to drop net-zero emissions targets, including NVES, if they win the next Australian Federal Election (which is set to take place by May 2028).

== See also ==
- ADR27A
