= Plug-in electric vehicles in Norway =

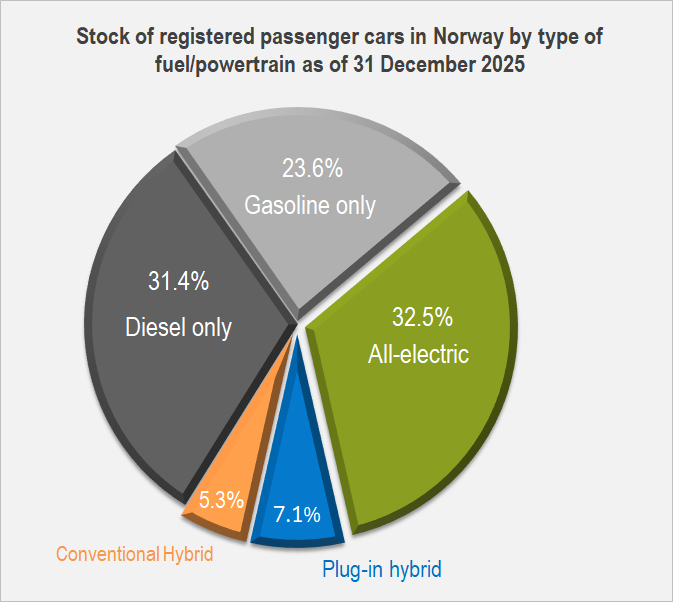
Distribution of the Norwegian stock of passenger cars in use by type of fuel or powertrain at the end of December 2025

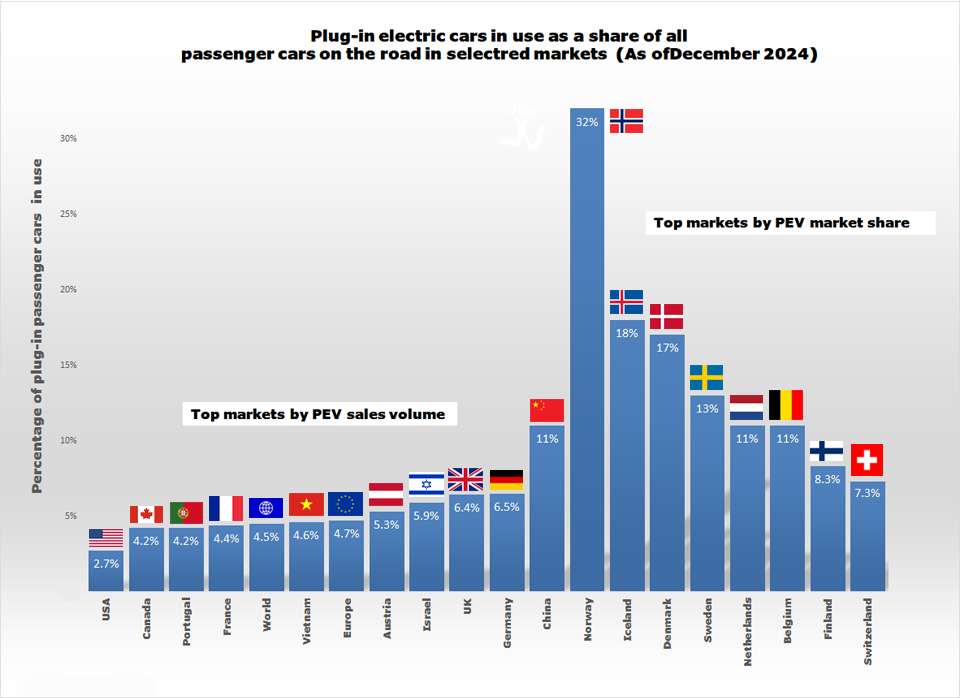
Plug-in electric cars in use as a share of all passenger cars on the road in selected countries and regional markets by the end of 2024

The Norwegian fleet of plug-in electric vehicles is the largest per capita in the world. In December 2016, Norway became the first country where five in every 100 passenger cars on the road were plug-in; attained 10% in October 2018, and reached 25% in September 2022.

The Norwegian plug-in car segment market share has been world's highest for several years, achieving 29.1% of new cars sold in 2016, 39.2% in 2017, 49.1% in 2018 55.9% in 2019, 74.7% in 2020, and 88.9% in 2024. The record uptake rate achieved in 2020 allowed Norway to become the first country in the world where annual sales of all-electric cars outsold the combined volume of all passenger cars with internal combustion engines. In January 2024, the share of combined EV was 93.9%: 92.1% full electrics (BEVs), and 1.8% plugin hybrids (PHEVs).

According to a 2018 analysis by McKinsey & Company, Norway has already reached a critical mass of electric vehicles. Therefore, the country is the only one in the world in the third stage of a disruptive trend, and the EV disruption is inevitable.

As of 31 December 2021, the stock of light-duty plug-in electric vehicles in Norway totalled 647,000 units in use, consisting of 470,309 all-electric passenger cars and vans (including used imports), and 176,691 plug-in hybrids. Norway listed as the top selling plug-in country market in Europe for three consecutive years, from 2016 to 2018. The Nissan Leaf is the country's all-time best selling plug-in electric car, with over 65,500 units registered through 2020.

The fleet of electric cars is one of the cleanest in the world since about 98% of the electricity generated in the country comes from renewable energy sources, mainly hydropower. In 2017, and as a result of its fast growing EV adoption, Norway was able to achieve its climate target for average fleet CO_{2} emissions (85 g/km) for new passenger cars three years earlier than pledged.

The adoption and deployment of zero emission vehicles in Norway has been driven by policy, and actively supported by the government since the 1990s. In addition to non-monetary incentives, all-electric cars and vans are exempt from all non-recurring vehicle fees, including purchase taxes, and 25% VAT on purchase, making electric car purchase price competitive with conventional cars. Also, a tax reduction for plug-in hybrids went into effect starting in July 2013.

In 2015 the Parliament agreed to reduce and phase out some of the incentives beginning in 2018. Also local authorities were granted the right to decide whether electric cars can park for free and use public transport lanes. In 2016, through its National Transport Plan 2018–2029 (NTP), a goal was set for all sales of new cars, urban buses and light commercial vehicles by 2025 to be zero emission vehicles.

Several unintended consequences have resulted from the successful policies implemented to promote EV adoption, and raised several complaints and criticism. These include: high public subsidies as compared to the value of the reduced carbon footprint of electric vehicles; the possibility of traffic congestion in some of Oslo's bus lanes due to the increasing number of electric cars; the loss of revenue for some ferry operators due to the large number of electric cars exempted from payment; and the shortage of parking spaces for owners of conventional cars due to preference to electric cars.

== Government goals and incentives ==
=== Existing incentives ===
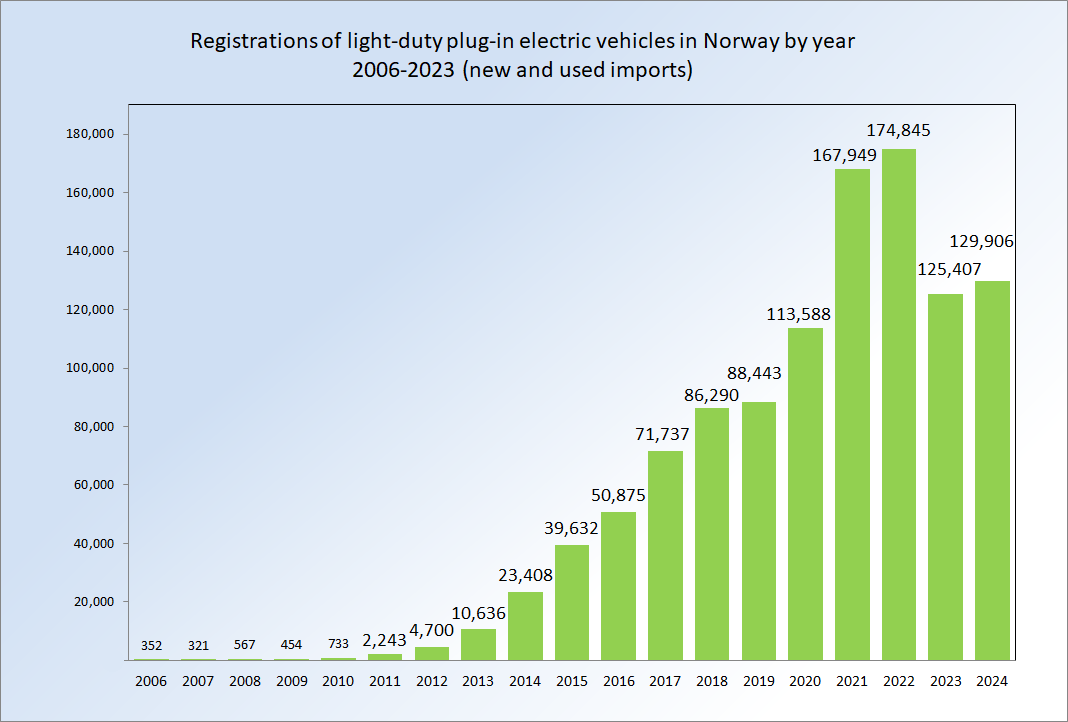
Registration of plug-in electric vehicles in Norway by year between 2004 and 2024

The adoption and deployment of electric vehicles in Norway, particularly zero emission vehicles, has been driven by policy, and since 1990, actively supported by the Norwegian government. The Parliament of Norway set the goal to reach 50,000 zero emission vehicles by 2018. Among the existing incentives, all-electric cars and utility vans are exempt in Norway from all non-recurring vehicle fees, including purchase taxes, which are extremely high for ordinary cars, and 25% VAT on purchase, together making electric car purchase price competitive with conventional cars. As an example, by early 2013 the price of the top selling Nissan Leaf was 240,690 kroner (around US$42,500) while the purchase price of the 1.3-lt Volkswagen Golf is 238,000 kroner (about US$42,000). Electric vehicles are also exempt from the annual road tax, all public parking fees, and toll payments, as well as being able to use bus lanes. These incentives are in effect until the end of 2017 or until the 50,000 EV target is achieved.

Timeline of government incentives and zero-emission vehicle milestones
| Date | Milestone |
|---|---|
| 1990 | Temporary exemption from import tax |
| 1996 | Import tax exemption made permanent |
| 1996 | Reduced annual registration tax |
| 1997 | Exemption from road tolls |
| 1998 | International launch of Th!nk in Brussels |
| 1999 | Special "EL" series plates introduced |
| 1999 | Free parking in public spaces |
| 1999 | The Danish company Kewet becomes Norwegian |
| 2000 | Reduced company car tax |
| 2001 | VAT reduced to zero percent |
| 2003 | Access to bus lanes in the Oslo region |
| 2005 | Access to bus lanes made permanent and extended nationwide |
| 2008 | Oslo launched municipal EV charging infrastructure program |
| 2009 | Free access to road ferries |
| 2011 | Mitsubishi i-MiEV and Nissan Leaf launched in Norway |
| 2012 | Norwegian Parliament extends electric car incentives until 2018, or when the 50,000 EV target is reached |
| 2012 | 10,000th electric car registered |
| Jul 2013 | Weight tax deduction for plug-in hybrids introduced |
| Aug 2013 | Tesla Model S launched in Norway |
| Sep 2013 | First country in the world to have an electric car topping the new car sales monthly ranking (Tesla Model S) |
| Mar 2014 | 1% of all cars in use are plug-in electrics |
| Apr 2015 | 50,000th all-electric car registered |
| May 2015 | Decision to keep existing incentives through 2017 |
| May 2015 | Parliament agreed to reduced EV tax incentives gradually beginning in 2018 |
| May 2015 | Local authorities granted right to decide about EV use public of bus lanes and free parking |
| Apr 2016 | 100,000th plug-in electric vehicle registered. |
| Jul 2016 | First EVs with the "EK" prefix series plates on the road. |
| Dec 2016 | 100,000th all-electric vehicle registered. |
| Dec 2016 | 5% of passenger cars on the road are plug-in electrics. |
| Dec 2017 | Over 200,000 plug-in electric vehicles registered. |
| Dec 2017 | 5% of all cars on the road are all-electric. |
| Dec 2017 | Average new fleet CO_{2} emissions in 2017 were 82g/km, achieving the government's target set for 2020. |
| Jul 2018 | First EVs with the "EV" prefix series plates on the road. |
| Oct 2018 | 10% of passenger cars on the road are plug-in electrics. |
| Dec 2018 | 200,000th all-electric vehicle registered. |
| Dec 2018 | The Nissan Leaf was the best selling new passenger car in 2018, first time an electric car topped annual sales. |
| Jan 2019 | 50,000th Nissan Leaf registered. |
| Sep 2019 | First EVs with the "EB" prefix series plates on the road. |
| Dec 2019 | The Tesla Model 3 listed as the best selling new car model, the second time an all-electric car topped annual sales. |
| Apr 2020 | 10% of all cars on the road are all-electric. |
| Jun 2020 | 300,000th battery electric vehicle was registered. |
| Dec 2020 | Over 15% of all cars on the road are plug-in electric. |
| Dec 2020 | Plug-in car segment achieved a record market share of 74.7% of annual new passenger car sales. |
| Dec 2020 | More than half of annual car sales were fully electric (54.3%). |
| Sep 2021 | Over 20% of all cars on the road are plug-in electric. |
| April 2022 | 500,000 all-electric cars on the road. |
| Sep 2022 | Over 25% of all cars on the road are plug-in electric. |
| June 2024 | Over 25% of all cars on the road are all-electric. |

Sales of plug-in hybrids have had a much smaller market penetration than pure electric car sales. Plug-in hybrids are not eligible for the same tax exemptions and other government incentives enacted for electric cars. Because the Norwegian tax system levies higher taxes to heavier vehicles, plug-in hybrids are more expensive than equivalent petrol and diesel-driven cars due to the extra weight of the battery pack and its additional electric components. Beginning on 1 July 2013, the existing weight deduction for conventional hybrids and plug-in hybrids of 10% was increased to 15% for PHEVs. The weight deduction was increased to 26% effective since January 2015. This fiscal incentive combined with a broader range of models available in the market resulted in record sales of plug-in hybrids in 2015, with almost 8,000 new units registered, up from about 1,700 in 2014. The plug-in hybrid market share rose to 5.2%, up from just over 1% in 2014, and from 4.2% in September 2015 to 13.9% in September 2016.

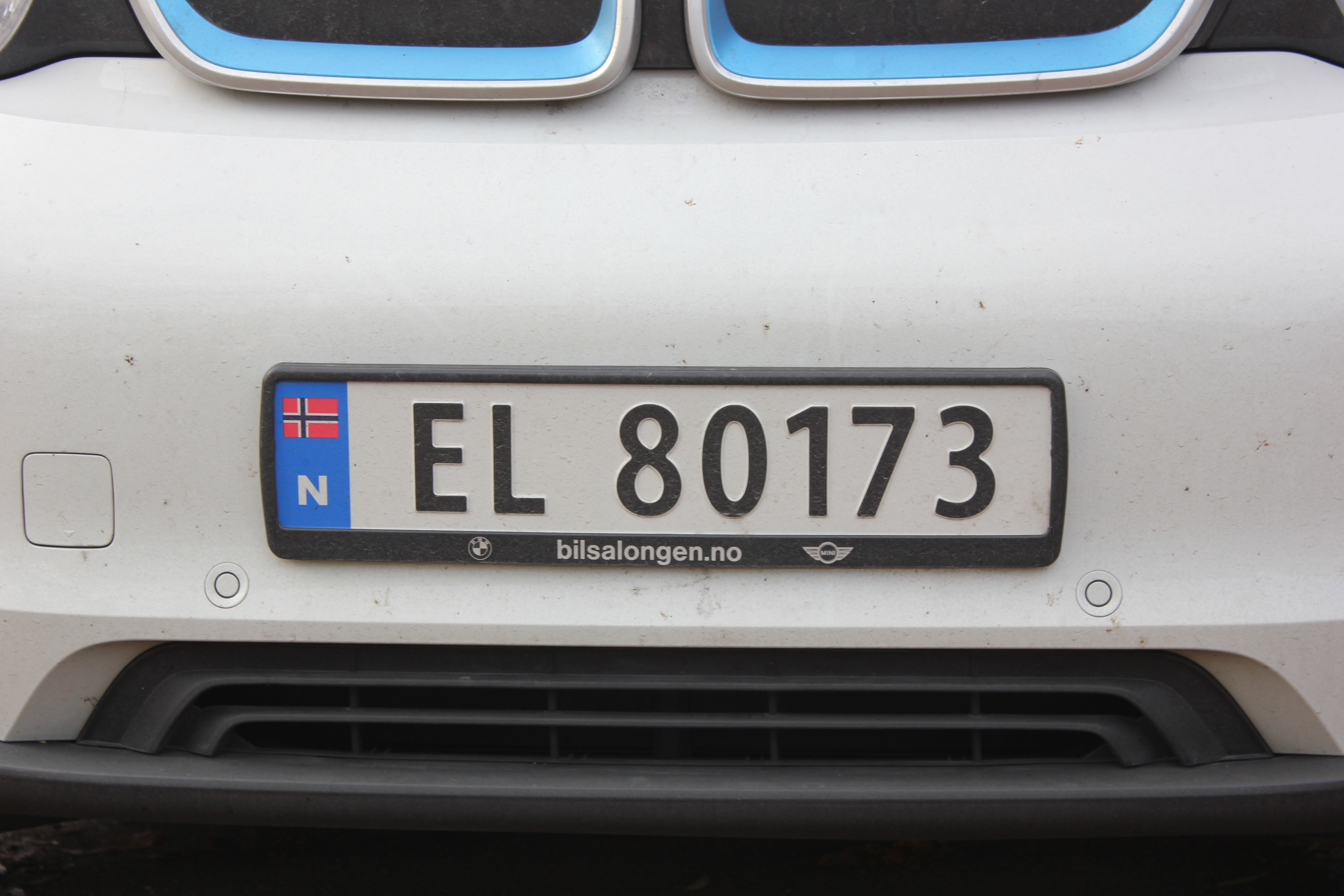
The "EL" licence plate prefix was depleted in July 2016.

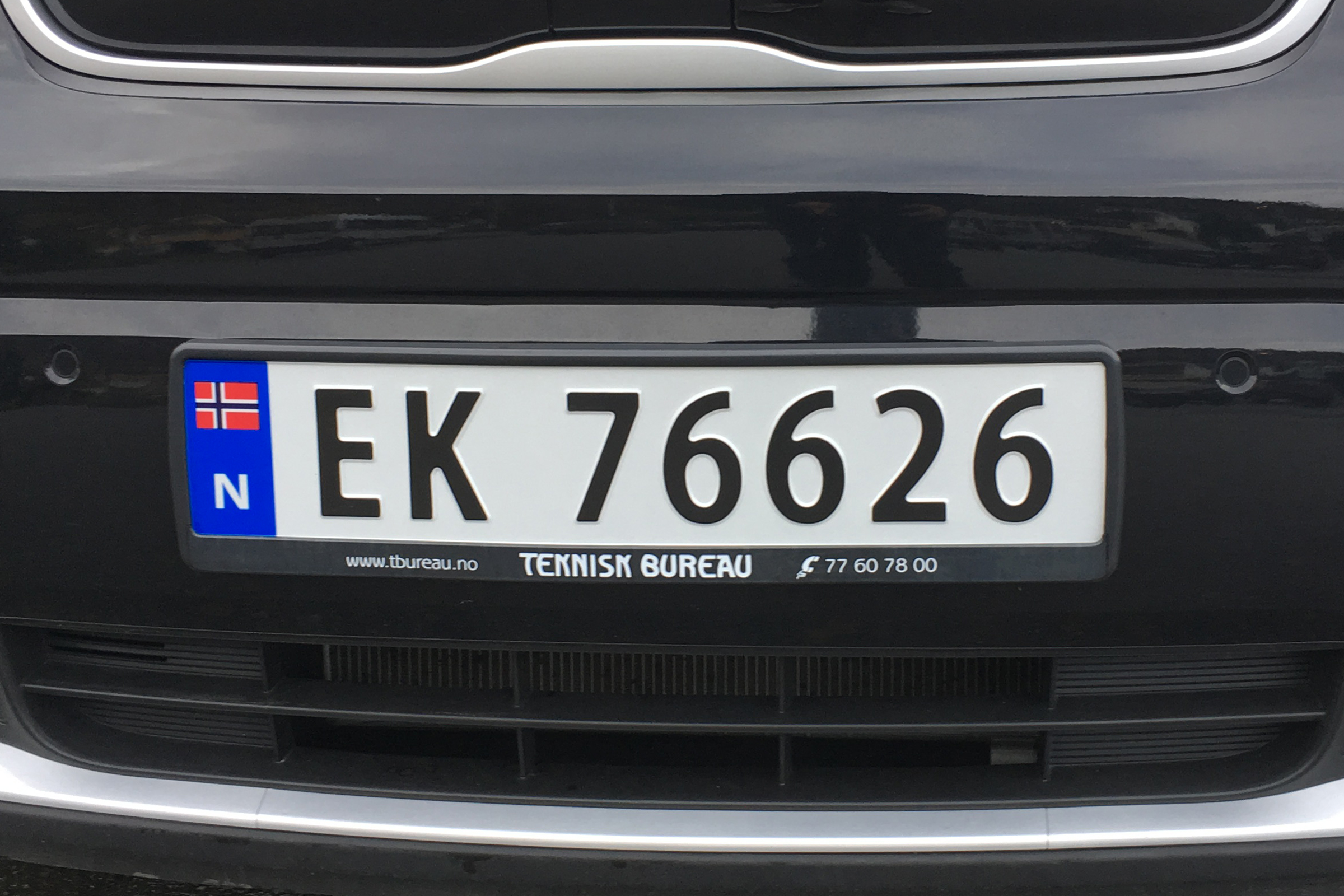
The "EK" licence plate prefix was depleted in July 2018.

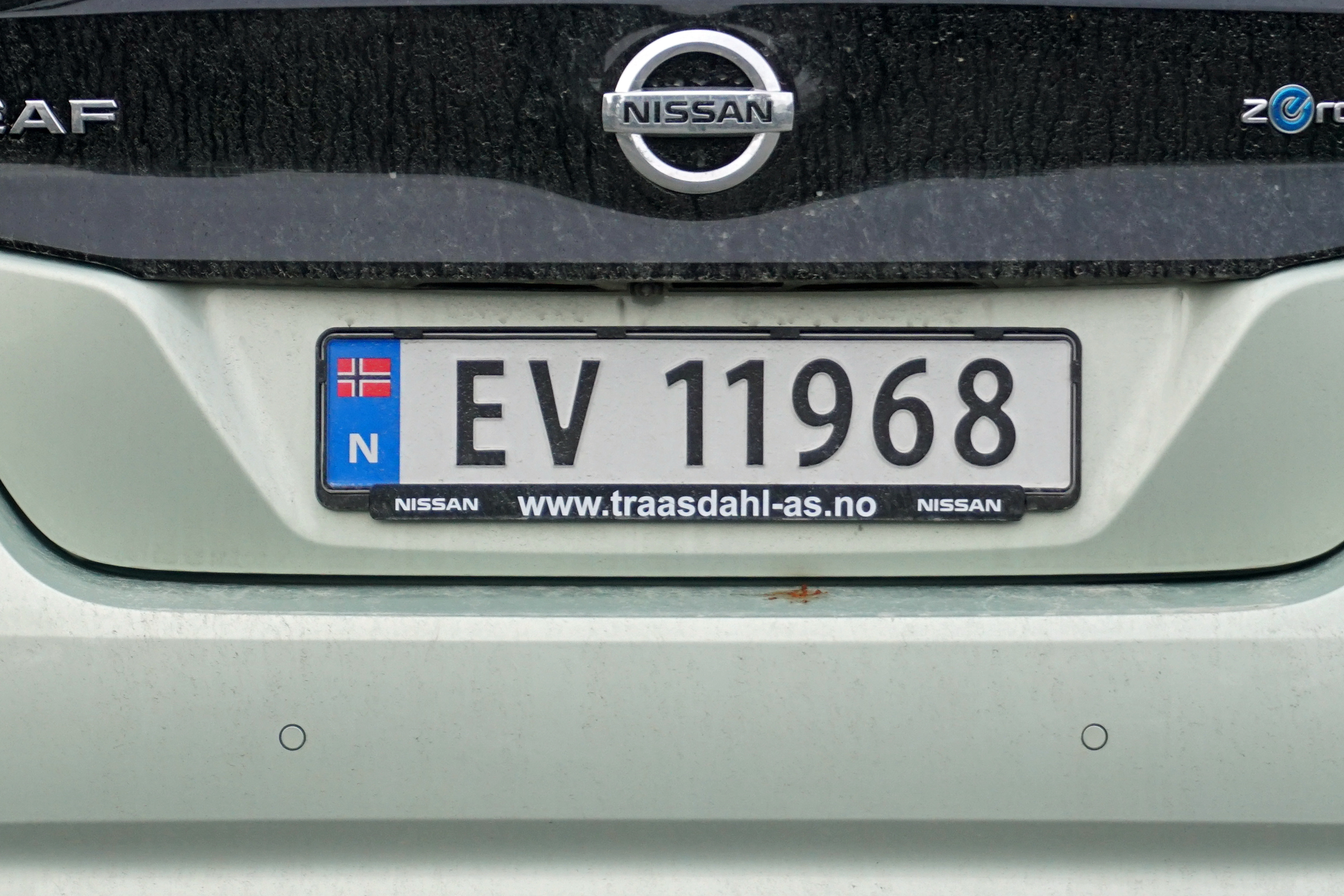
The Norwegian licence plates of pure electric vehicles have a prefix "EL", "EK", "EV" or "EB" to enforce the incentives and perks to which EVs are entitled to.

The government set identifying letters ("EL", "EK", "EV" and "EB") for use on licence plates of electric vehicles to facilitate the enforcement of EV incentives and perks such a free parking, free passage through toll booths etc. Correspondingly, hydrogen vehicles have "HY" as identifying letters. There is no equivalent for plug-in hybrids.

As the number of registered electric cars and vans reached 60,000 units by July 2015, and because the "EL" prefix was set to end at "EL 99999" (most vehicles in the country have five-digit registration numbers between 10000 and 99999), the Norwegian Public Roads agency opted for the prefix "EK" for the second series of plates, to signify "elektrisk kjøretøy", Norwegian for electric vehicle. The "EV" prefix was set aside for future electric cars.

In July 2016, the first electric vehicles registered with the new "EK" series were on the road. About 90,000 pure electric vehicles have been registered by the end of August 2016, depleting the "EL" prefix plates. Just over two years later, in July 2018, the "EK" series was depleted, and the prefix "EV" plates were deployed. The first vehicles with the "EB" prefix series were registered in September 2019. The prefix "EB" stands for "elektrisk bil", Norwegian for electric car. The next special series will be "EC" with no particular meaning.

In September 2013, the Norwegian Parliament approved, as part of the revised 2014 budget, an exemption from the 25% VAT for leasing electric vehicles effective on 1 January 2014. However, as of September 2014, the exemption had not gone into effect because the Minister of Finance decided to deferred the measure, pending a formal consultation with the EFTA Surveillance Authority (ESA) to ensure that the VAT exemption for leasing was not in violation of the European Economic Area (EEA) Agreement. The government's loss of revenue due to the still not implemented leasing exemption is estimated at 47 million kroner (around US$7.3 million) per year. One Member of Parliament has criticised the government for the delay. He argued that the initial VAT exemption for all electric vehicles was never approved in ESA. In addition, an ESA spokesman confirmed that the Government has not sent any request as of September 2014, nor has the agency received any complaints about Norway's original EV tax exemption. The MP said he would demand that the decision be implemented when Parliament meets in October 2014. The consultation was presented to ESA in November 2014, and the authority ruled in April 2015 that the implementation of the VAT exemption on leasing of electric vehicles and electric vehicle batteries is in line the EEA Agreement, since the goal is to reduce greenhouse gas emissions. The approval from ESA initially applies until the end of 2017, but the government can apply for an extension if the zero rate for VAT is kept. The exemption for leasing of electric vehicles went into effect in July 2015.

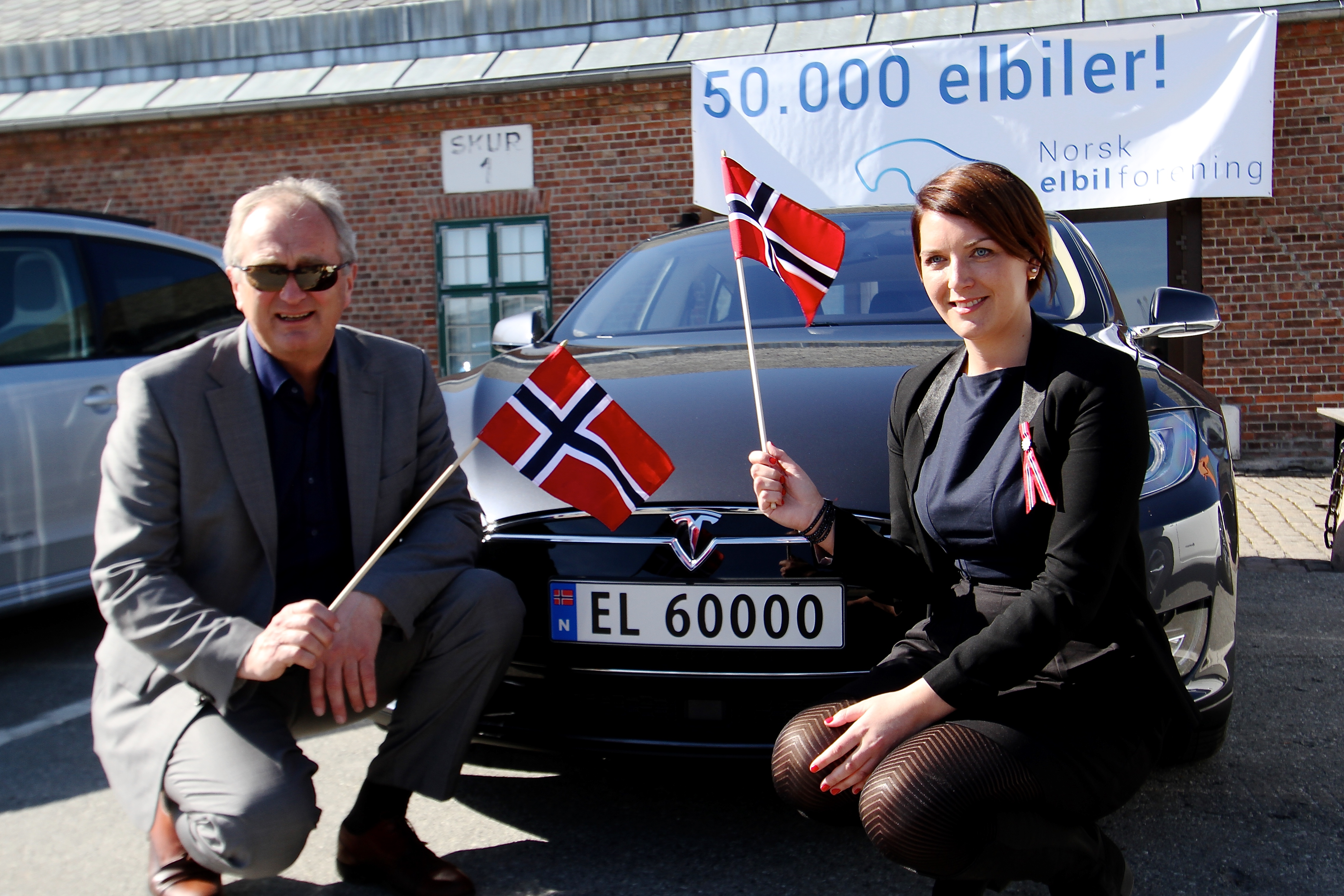
The government's initial goal of 50,000 electric cars on Norwegian roads was reached on 20 April 2015. The plate "EL 60000" was granted to the 50,000th electric car registered.

The target of 50,000 electric cars on Norwegian roads was reached on 20 April 2015, more than two years earlier than expected. The milestone was commemorated by the Norwegian Electric Vehicle Association in Drammen where the 50,000th electric car registered, a Tesla Model S, was granted the licence plate "EL 60000." The special electric vehicle series began with "EL 10000." By reaching a stock of 50,000 electric cars, the market penetration of pure electric vehicles reached 2% of all passenger cars registered in Norway. The milestone of 100,000 light-duty battery electric vehicles was achieved in December 2016, representing about 10% of all pure electric cars that have been sold worldwide. According to the Norwegian Electric Vehicle Association, if the country wants to reach the ambitious climate goals set by the Parliament, the next goal is to have 400,000 battery electric vehicles by 2020. However, by early June 2020, the 300,000th light-duty battery electric vehicle was registered.

==== Phase out of incentives ====
As one of the criteria to end the incentives was achieved, as of April 2014, no decision was made by the authorities about the reintroduction of the 25% VAT on purchase of electric vehicles. Among the options considered by the government were to introduce the tax in a step-wise fashion. However, Prime Minister Erna Solberg announced the government decided not to make any changes about the electric car benefits in the 2015 budget.

In early March 2015, negotiations began among parties represented in the Parliament to define the future of all motor vehicles and fuel taxes. The Liberal Party wanted all the benefits to continue beyond the established quota. The Ministry of Finance also made a comprehensive review of all motor vehicle taxes. The two purchase tax exemptions cost the government about 3 billion kroner (around US$480 million) in lost revenue just in 2014, and up to 4 billion kroner (around US$640 million) if all the other benefits are accounted for. In May 2015, the Government decided to keep the existing incentives through 2017, and the political parties in Parliament agreed to reduced and phase out some of the incentives. Beginning in January 2018, electric car owners will be required to pay half of the yearly road licence fee and the full rate as of 2020. The value-added tax (VAT) exemption for electric cars was scheduled to end in 2018, but replaced by a new scheme, which may be subjected to a ceiling that could be reduced as technology develops. The agreement also gave local authorities the right to decide whether electric cars can park for free and use public transport lanes.

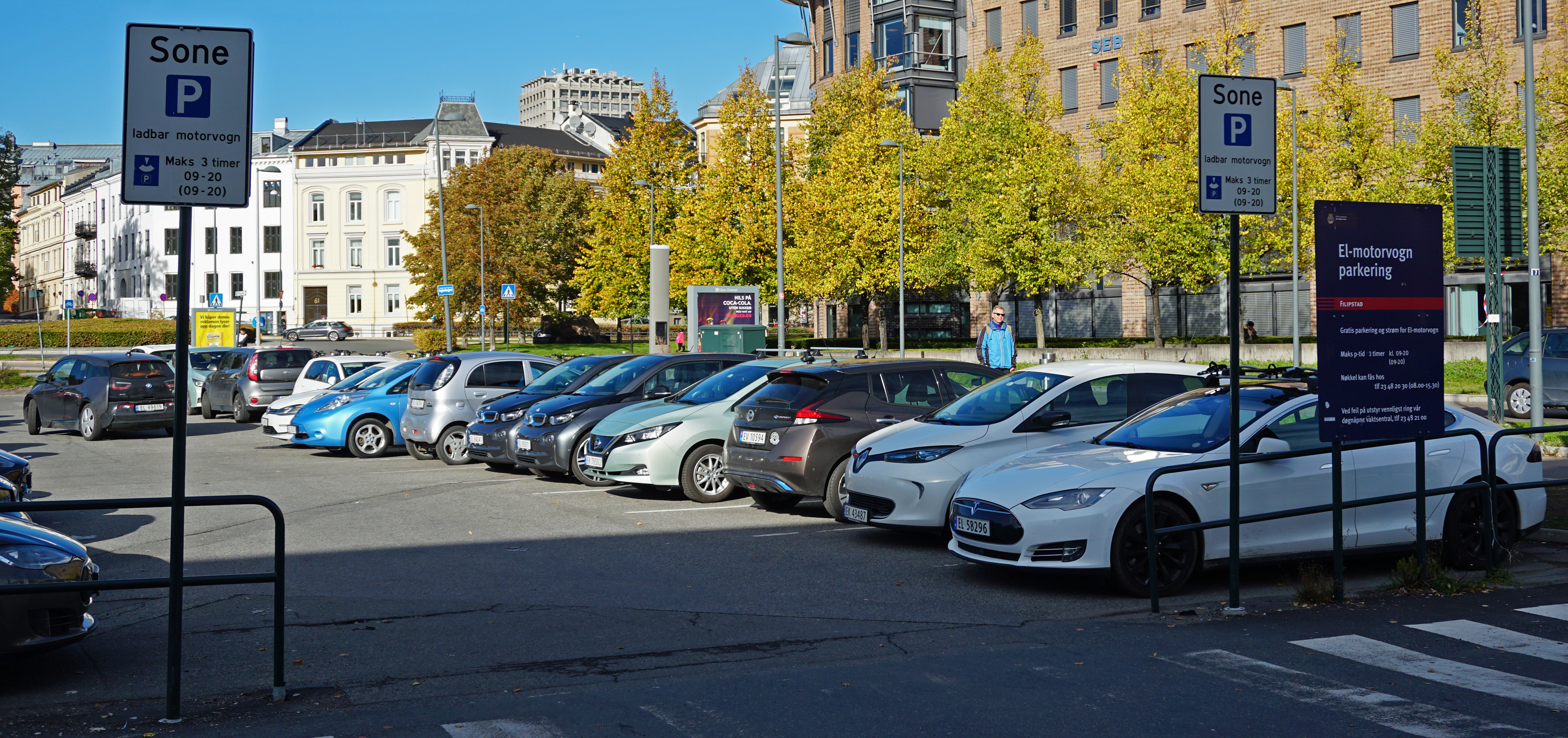
All-electric cars at a free parking lot reserved for charging in Oslo (2018), which kept the perk. Since January 2017, free parking for EVs was terminated in 34 major municipalities.

In March 2016, the Ministry of Transport issued new regulations for parking in locations with access to the general public. The new parking regulations, that went into effect on 1 January 2017, terminated the free parking for zero-emission vehicles, but established that Municipalities are allowed to introduce payment exemption for electric and hydrogen powered motor vehicles on municipal parking locations. As of September 2016, the municipal councils of Trondheim Municipality and Tønsberg Municipality decided to introduce full payment for EVs from 2017; the cities of Bodø and Tromsø introduced payment for parking in downtown but exempted parking outside the city's center; and the cities of Oslo, Mandal and Drammen decided to keep free parking for zero-emission vehicles. As of January 2018, 24 out of 58 major municipalities kept the free parking for EVs. Among the 34 municipalities that terminated the benefit, six kept different variants of partial free parking.

For the 2017 National Budget, the Government proposed to extend the VAT exemption for zero-emission vehicles until 2020. It also put forward a national rule to keep a maximum tax rate of zero-emission vehicles equal to half the value charged to conventional cars. The budget proposal also included an adjustment to exempt plug-in hybrids from the higher taxes levied to heavier vehicles, and instead, to charge taxes based on their fuel economy under the New European Driving Cycle (NEDC). Until 2016, all plug-in hybrids had a weight allowance of 26% regardless of their all-electric range or fuel efficiency.

In October 2017, the National Government proposed in its 2018 Budget a new tax for EVs based on weight. This proposal would affect mainly bigger electric car models, all Tesla vehicles, and in particular the Tesla Model X. After some public controversy, the proposal was dropped. Nevertheless, Tesla's sales surge at the end of 2017 for consumers' fear of the introduction of the new tax.

=== Goals for 2018–2029 ===
In February 2016, the government opened for public discussion until 1 July 2016 the proposed National Transport Plan 2018–2029 (NTP). The plan explains that the transportation sector accounts for emissions of about 16.5 million tons of CO_{2}, which is about one third of the total greenhouse gas emissions produced domestically in Norway. And road traffic, including both private cars and heavy vehicles, account for about 10 million tons of CO_{2}. The NTP set policies and actions to reduce greenhouse gas emissions from private cars, trucks, ships, aircraft and construction equipment by about one half until 2030.

In order to achieve this objective, among others, the NTP sets the goal for all sales of new cars, urban buses and light commercial vehicles in 2025 to be zero emission vehicles, this is, all-electric and hydrogen vehicles. By 2030, heavy-duty vans, 75% of new long-distance buses, and 50% of new trucks must be zero emission vehicles. Also, by 2030, 40% of all ships in short sea shipping should be using biofuels or be low- or zero-emission ships. The proposed strategy states that until zero-emission vehicles take over, all internal combustion engine cars sold be plug-in hybrids, and wherever possible, biofuels must be used. Also, government agencies should as far as possible make use of biofuels, low- and zero-emission technologies in private and hired vehicles and vessels. The plan also calls to support the deployment of zero emission vehicles, but also for the reduction of the existing incentives, and proposes to invest more in public transport, walking and cycling.

=== Criticism of the incentives ===
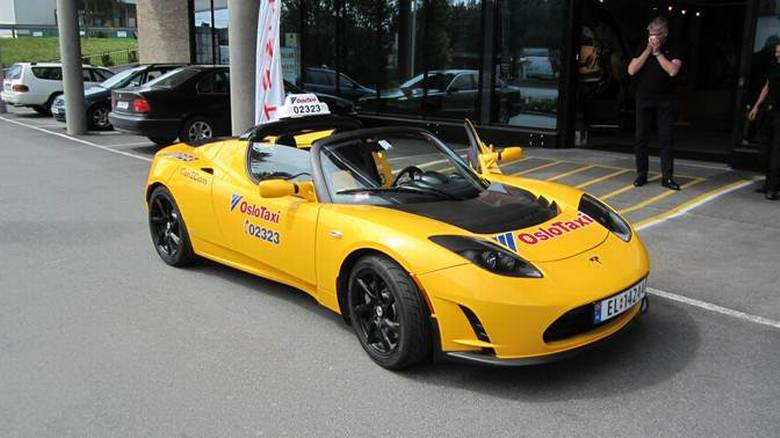
Tesla Roadster providing taxi cab service in Oslo

Since 2013 several complaints and criticism have arisen due to the rapid increase in the number of electric vehicles on the roads as a result of the existing incentives to promote EV adoption, and particularly about the non-fiscal incentives. These include high public subsidies as compared to the value of the reduced carbon footprint of electric vehicles; the travel mode shift by people who buy an electric vehicle as a second car instead of taking buses and trains; the potential traffic congestion in Oslo's bus lanes due to the increasing number of electric cars; the loss of revenue for some ferry operators due to the large number of electric cars exempted from payment; and shortage of parking spaces for owners of conventional cars due to preference to electric cars and lack of a cap on parking time.

==== Excessive subsidies ====
According to the results of a study published by Reuters in March 2013, prepared by Bjart Holtsmark, an analyst of Statistics Norway, the tax exemptions on the purchase of an electric car are worth almost US$11,000 in comparison to the fully taxed price of a regular internal combustion engine car, which is equivalent to US$1,400 a year over a car's lifetime (8 years). The value of the toll exemption for driving into Oslo are worth US$1,400 per year, the free parking is worth US$5,000 per year, and electric cars avoid other charges worth US$400 a year. Without adding value to the benefit of driving in bus lanes, the annual benefit of owning an electric car in Oslo is estimated at US$8,200 per car, per year. The analysis used a Toyota Prius Plug-in Hybrid as the benchmark vehicle. Mr. Holtsmark also pointed out that "by encouraging people who can afford it to buy a second car instead of taking buses and trains, the electric car scheme may ironically be aggravating environmental problems and causing traffic jams".

The Norwegian project Grønn bil (Green Car) disputed these figures because they consider the analysis is based on unrealistic assumptions. The group argues that the analysis used a very short total vehicle lifespan of 7.8 years, while Norway's average is closer to 18 years; it is very unlikely that a vehicle can be parked in Oslo between 1,875 hours and 3,000 hours per year to save the estimated US$5.000 considering the existing time limits for parking; and the typical EV owner drives around 15,000 km (9,300 mi) per year, not the 6,500 km (4,000 mi) implicit in the analysis. Using what they consider more realistic assumptions, Grønn bil estimates that the annual benefit of owning an electric car in Oslo is estimated at US$3,336 per car, per year, 40% of Holtsmark's estimation. They also found that the cost per tonne of CO_{2} emissions reduced is US$2,499, not the US$13,600 estimated by Holtsmark.

==== Bus lane congestion ====
In December 2013 the newspaper Budstikka conducted an informal test to measure the difference in travel time between an electric car and a petrol-driven car during the morning rush hour on a stretch of road between the suburban municipality of Asker in Akershus, and Skøyen, a neighbourhood of Oslo. The electric car completed the trip in 19 minutes using the bus lane while it took 51 minutes for the conventional car travelling in the normal lanes. Around noon, the same trip took the electric car just 13 minutes.

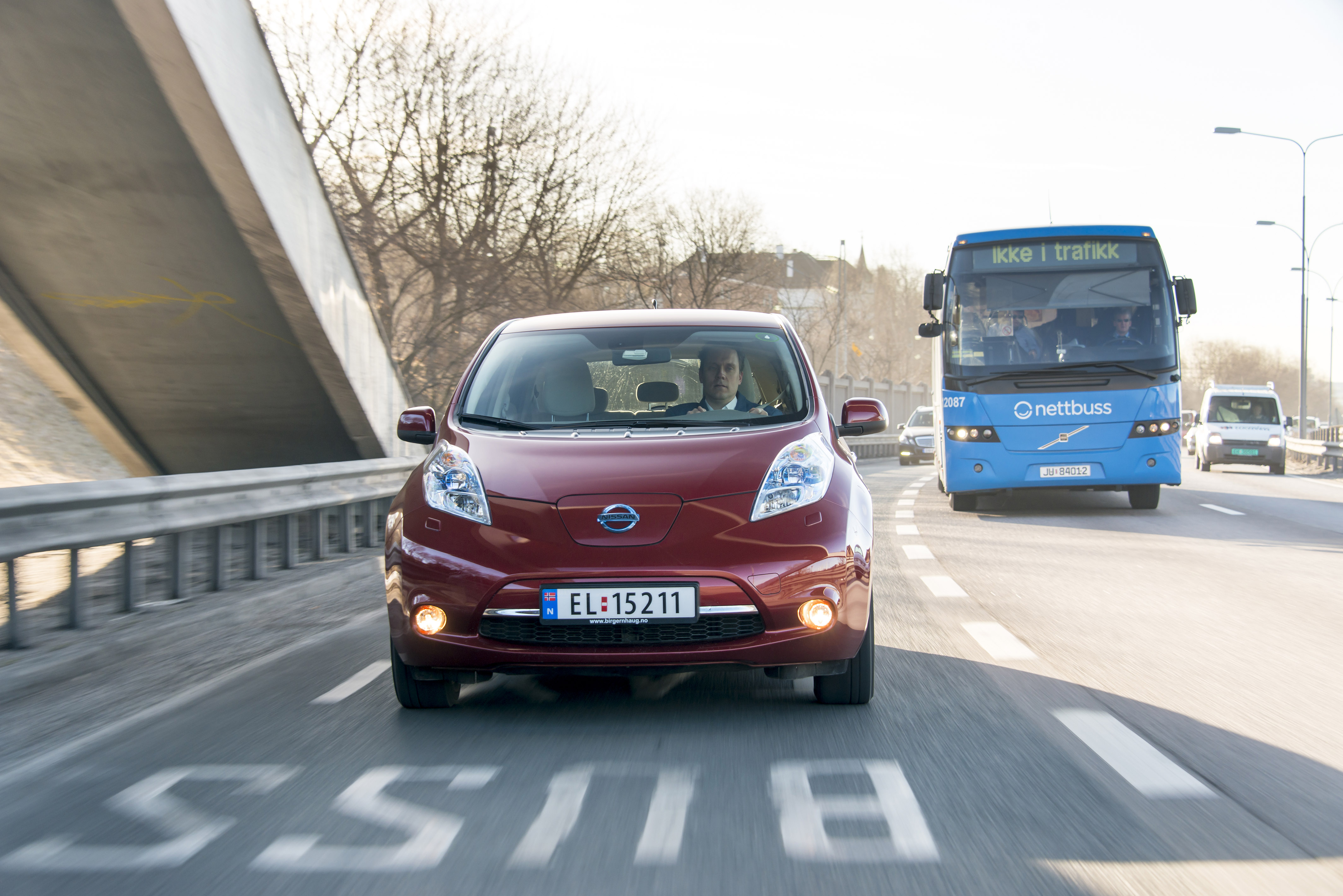
All-electric cars have access to bus lanes in Norway. Shown a Nissan Leaf, the top selling plug-in electric car for three years running (2012–2014).

Budstikka also did a count of the number of vehicles travelling in the bus lane during the rush hour on 3 December 2013. The newspaper found that a total of 829 vehicles used the bus lane between 7:30 and 8:30 am, of which, 618 vehicles were electric cars (74.5%). Buses accounted for only 7.5% of the traffic in the bus lane, and taxis, two-wheelers and mini-buses made up the rest. The deputy director of the Institute of Transport Economics (TØI) explained that the normal capacity of a highway lane is between 1,800 and 2,000 vehicles per hour, but because of the ramp entrances and exits, and the buses manoeuvring in and out the bus lane to do their stops, the traffic flow starts to become troublesome when the number of vehicles in the bus lane is about 1,000 vehicles per hour. Although by December 2013 the traffic is approaching this limit, TØI's Deputy Director did not want to predict when this critical situation will occur. The Manager of the green car advocate group Grønn Bil warned that "if the only reason people bought an electric car is to drive in the bus lane, they will probably be disappointed sooner or later".

By mid-2014, bus drivers in some parts of Oslo begun complaining about the delays caused by the ever-increasing number of electric cars. An interviewed bus driver expressed his concern that the electric cars "can create a vicious circle – tired of being stuck in traffic, bus users could be tempted to buy an electric car themselves, worsening the congestion problem." According to the Norwegian Public Roads Administration, as of August 2014, electric cars represent 85% of traffic in the bus lanes during rush hours. As of late August 2014, Norwegian ministers are under increasing pressure to reduce the non-financial incentives and tax breaks for electric cars in order to reduce a rising congestion problem, but no decision has been made by the central government authorities. The success of electric car adoption was unexpected, as the authorities planned to keep the incentives in place until the end of 2017, or until they reach 50,000 units. At the pace of sales reached during 2014, the target of 50,000 EVs registered could be met by April or May 2015.

According to local authorities from the city of Oslo, the negative effects on the bus lanes occur only at certain places and in certain times of the day, particularly at the Norwegian National Road E18, west of Oslo. The problems are concentrated at the exit and entry ramps that in the long term might have serious consequences for bus accessibility. All the involved agencies are monitoring the situation and Oslo's authorities consider that restrictions for EVs to access the bus lanes should be considered only when it becomes a major problem for the buses.

==== Burden on ferry operators ====
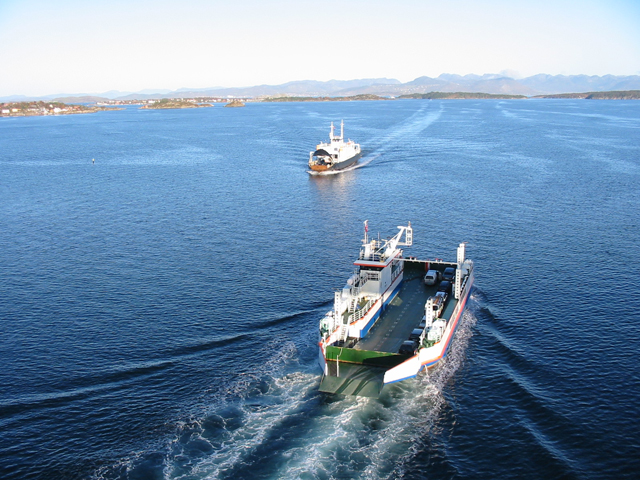
Electric cars are exempted from payment of ferryboat fees.

As part of the incentives to promote EV adoption, plug-in electric vehicles are exempted from payment of ferryboat fees, but only the car crosses for free, the driver and each passenger pay the ordinary fare. The accelerated growth of electric cars on some ferry routes has caused complaints from ferryboat operators due to the increasing loss on their farebox revenues. According to FosenNamsos Sea AS, an operator with four ferry lines servicing Hordaland county, during the first seven months of 2014 the number of electric vehicles riding the service Krokeidet-Hufthamar from Hordaland increased by 215% compared to the same period last year, for a total of 9,226 electric cars not paying the ferry fee through the end of July. The company argues that "no one could foresee the tremendous growth of electric cars we see on some ferry routes, but the Austevoll satellite connection involves a significant loss of revenue for us."

On 1 June 2014, the company's home county of Sør-Trøndelag repealed the payment exemption for electric vehicles on the county ferries. The company has also requested to Transport of Hordaland a similar end of the exemption or some form of the income loss compensation. FosenNamsos Sea AS has argued that the financial burden should be on the government not the ferry operators. As of 1 September 2014, the county of Hordaland had 5,016 registered electric cars, the second largest in Norway after Oslo. Hordaland transport authorities are studying the request but already have stated that the agency must follow state regulations for ferry rates and the regulations established for electric cars.

==== Unfairness of free parking ====
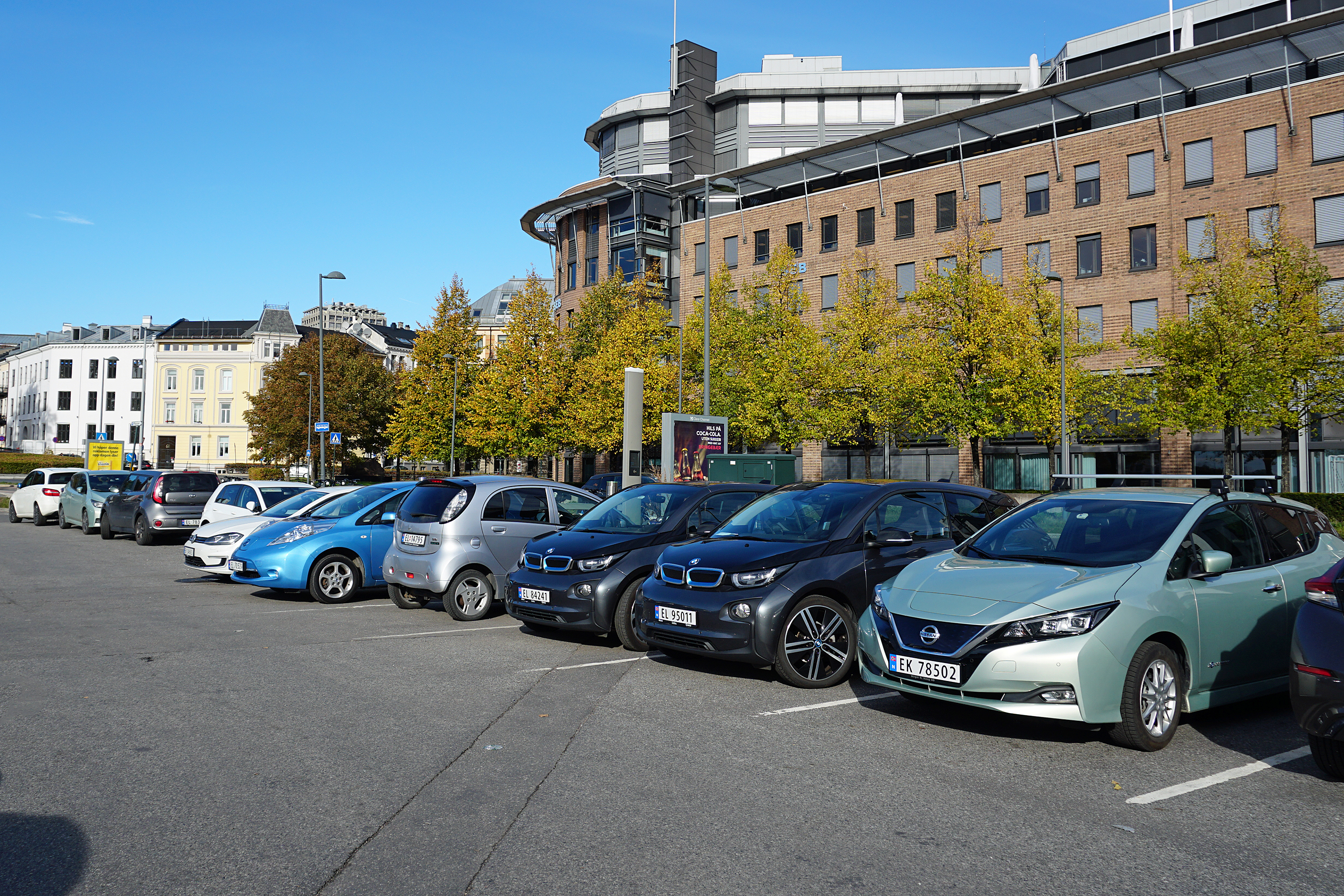
Free parking lot exclusive for all-electric cars in Oslo, Norway

As an incentive to promote EV adoption, plug-in electric vehicles are exempted from public parking fees. Politicians in Trondheim, in Sør-Trøndelag county are complaining about the lack of parking spaces for owners of conventional cars due to preference to electric cars. The city has a five-hour time limit for electric cars to use street parking for free, but electric car owners who use their car to commute keep moving their cars during the day and end up having free parking all day while they are at work. A city council member noted that in many streets there are large numbers of plug-in electric vehicles parked all day, and sometimes there are more electric cars than regular cars. This situation makes it difficult to find parking for those who come to the city to shop. In addition, the municipality of Trondheim is losing revenue. The city councillor wants to end the incentives electric car owners have to park downtown Trondheim all day long for free.

=== Charging infrastructure ===
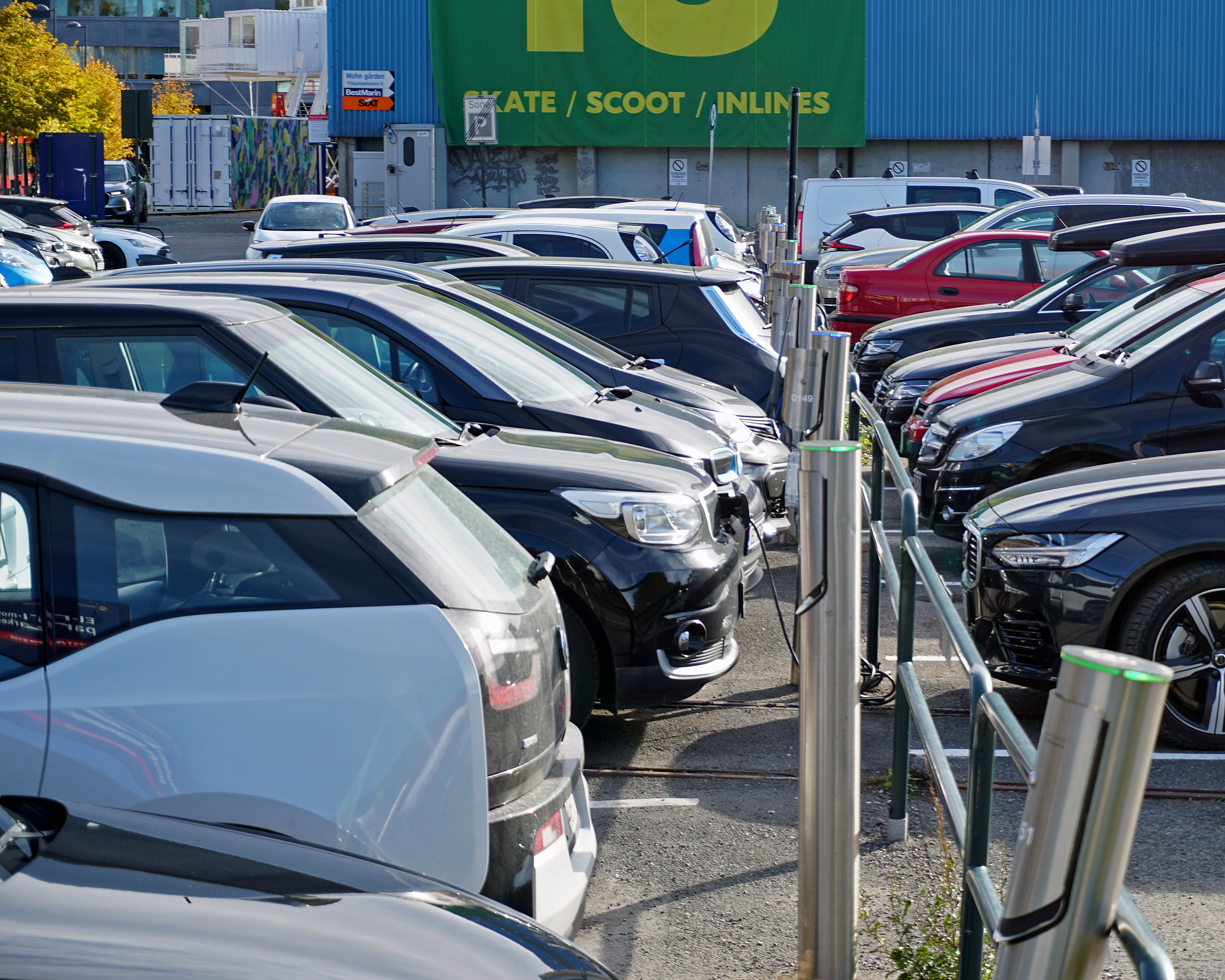
Parking lot with normal charging points in Oslo

As of March 2016, there were in the country 7,632 electric recharge points. The county with the most stations is Oslo with 1,996 points, followed by Akershus with 1,117, and Hordaland with 932.

As of December 2019, a total 13,687 public charging points were available in Norway, up from 10,711 in 2018. Of these, 770 were fast charging points at Tesla supercharger stations, 1,487 were CHAdeMO quick charging points, and 1,592 were CCS 50 kW+. By early 2020, the counties with the most quick chargers were Viken (198 Tesla and 388 CHAdeMO/CCS), Vestland (128 Tesla and 290 CHAdeMO/CCS), and Innlandet (128 Tesla and 173 CHAdeMO/CCS). Oslo has 118 CHAdeMO/CCS (none Tesla).

== Usage patterns and attitudes ==
=== 2013 survey ===
In June 2013, the Norwegian Electric Vehicle Association (Norsk Elbilforening) conducted a survey among all-electric car owners, with a total of 1,858 respondents, representing over 15% of all the electric car owners in Norway. The study found that the typical electric car owner is a middle-aged family father with higher education and income, and he owns a Nissan Leaf as one of two cars. A total of 85% of the respondents had two or more cars in their household because they need a second car for longer journeys given the limited range current electric cars can provide. However, for everyday needs, the study found that one electric car is sufficient. Norwegians travel 42 km on average every day, mostly by car. Based on the survey, the study found that 15% of the electric car owners do their daily travel with just their one electric car. These users opt for public transport or car rental/sharing for longer trips, because high taxation on traditional cars in Norway makes it expensive to own a car.

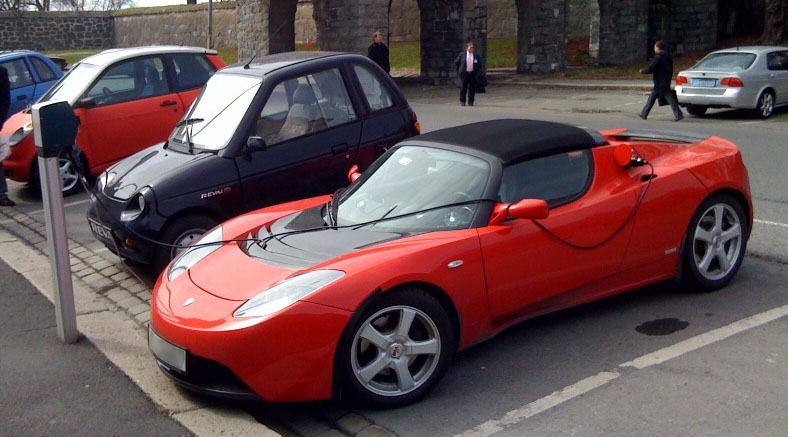
Several electric cars at a free parking and charging station in Oslo, Norway, c. 2010. From farthest to closest, a Th!nk City, a REVAi, and a Tesla Roadster.

The study also found that about half of the respondents to the 2013 survey own a Nissan Leaf the best-selling electric car in Norway and among the top five at the general model ranking. About 5% of the respondents had more than one electric car, as some owners kept their old electric car (such as Th!nk and Buddy) when they bought a new one. The survey showed that in most cases electric cars replaced a traditional car (87%), but also use of public transport (10%), and walking and bicycling (1%). Regarding everyday use of electric cars, the study found that owners use the electric car mostly for commuting to work (89.6%), shopping (88.4%) and driving to after work activities (77.0%). Other uses include delivery of children to school or kindergarten (40.9%) and for business purposes (40.2%). On the other hand, use of the electric car for holiday travel is very limited (11.7%).

As for the charging patterns, the 2013 survey found that 85% of the respondents could charge in their own garage or parking lot, and 10% had access to charging in the shared apartment building where they live. This means that 95% of the respondents were able to charge their electric cars at home during the night. The survey showed that 59% of the respondents had access to charging where they work, and 48% at public charging stations in the area they normally use the electric car.

=== 2016 survey ===
The Norwegian Institute of Transport Economics conducted in March 2016 a survey among over 8,000 vehicle owners in Norway. The study's aim was to identified how the plug-in vehicles are used, why they are bought and how the technology is rated compared to owners of internal combustion engine (ICE) vehicles. The sample consisted of 3,111 all-electric vehicles (BEV) owners, 2,065 private plug-in hybrid (PHEV) owners, and 3,080 ICE vehicle owners. The study found that buyers of BEVs and PHEVs have different transport needs but both are motivated by economy of use and environment, whereas all-electric vehicle owners are also motivated by the free toll road incentive. The survey showed that normally diesel and petrol vehicles are replaced with the purchase of a plug-in vehicle, but a larger share of battery electric vehicles become extra vehicles in households. BEV owners are younger, have more children, travel a longer distance to work and own more vehicles than other vehicle owners.

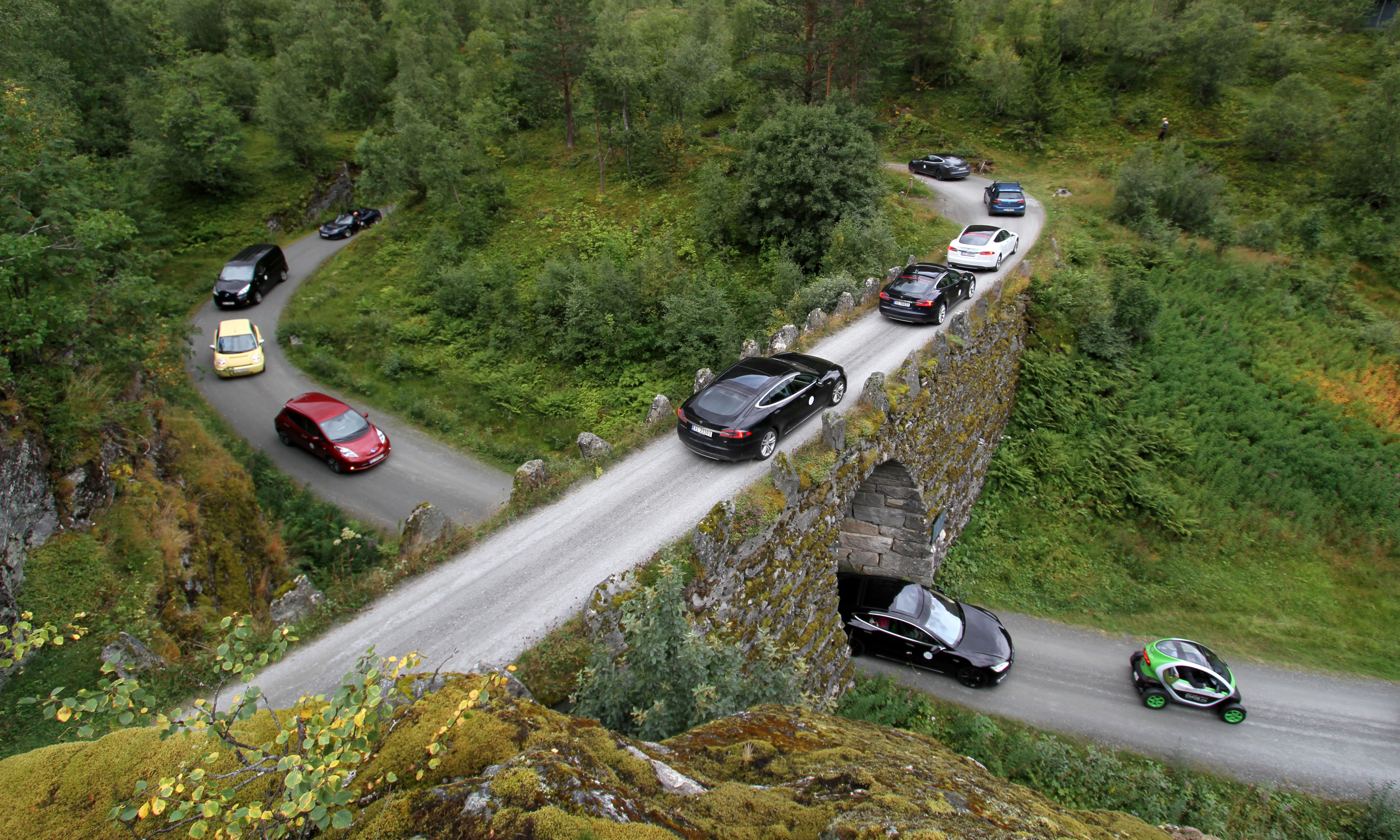
Electric vehicle festival in Geiranger

Most BEV owners (71%) also own an ICEV, 4% a PHEV, and 4% more than one BEV. The remaining 21% only have one BEV. 46% of PHEV owners and 48% of ICEV owners belong to single vehicle household. The most multipurpose BEV, Tesla Model S, is twice as common in single BEV households as in households also owning ICEVs, and four times as common in households owning several BEVs. Based on the survey, the researchers found that plug-in hybrid owners in Norway drive on average 55% of their annual distance in charge-depleting or all-electric mode (EV mode), and the share goes up to about 63% for work trips. The share of electric travel is higher for trips to work and in the summer, and lower in the winter. The average plug-in hybrid user in the survey drives 60% of the total distance in EV mode in the summer and 53% in winter. The estimate for work trips is higher at 70% in the summer and 59% in winter. On the other hand, the study found that battery electric vehicles are driven more in total and in everyday traffic.

According to the survey results, plug-in vehicles are mainly charged at home, whether in their garage or at an outdoor parking on the owner property, with 59% of BEV owners and 74% of PHEV owners charging this way. Only 6% of BEV owners and 5% of PHEV owners never charge at home. Charging at work is relatively common among BEV owners, 28% do it more than twice a week, 38% weekly. About 21% of PHEV owners do it at least weekly. Charging elsewhere is rare, but BEVs owners more frequently recharged at public charging stations and shopping centers than PHEV owners. Fast charging is used for irregular trips where users plan to use fast chargers to accomplish the trip or to solve a problem on the go. Most battery electric vehicle owners manage everyday life well and are satisfied with the vehicle which in combination with attractive local incentives not available to plug-in hybrid owners and other vehicle users.

Peer-to-peer influences is particularly important to diffusion of battery electric vehicles being the biggest source of information leading to the purchase. Plug-in hybrid buyers received most information leading to the purchase from dealers and advertising material. The four reasons most frequently mentioned by the 89% of BEV owners who say they will buy a BEV again are economy of use, environmental performance, future proof technology, and the free usage of toll roads without paying. Less than 1% will not buy a BEV again. The reasons not to buy again are range and charging issues. The three main reasons why 80% of PHEV owners say they will buy one again are economy of use, environmental performance and that the technology is future proof. Only 2% will not buy a PHEV again. The main reasons not to buy again are the short range in all-electric mode and inability to use EV mode when it is cold.

=== 2018 survey ===
The Norwegian Electric Vehicle Association (Norsk Elbilforening) conducted a survey among all-electric car owners in June 2018, with a total of 9,520 respondents. The study found that 63% of Norwegian households with electric cars also have a fossil car or hybrid car, down from 70% in 2017. The survey also found that among respondents having only one car in the household, one third (32.4%) are electric car owners, up from 26.3% in 2017.

== Market and sales ==
Cumulative light-duty plug-in electric vehicle sales in Norway compared to the world's top-selling countries and regional markets. As of December 2021, Norway is the European country with the fourth largest stock of light-duty plug-in electric vehicles.

The government's initial goal of 50,000 pure electric vehicles on Norwegian roads was achieved by late April 2015. The stock of light-duty plug-in electric vehicles registered in Norway passed the 100,000 unit milestone in April 2016, and registrations of light-duty all-electric vehicles achieved the 100,000 unit milestone in December 2016. By December 2017, there were over 200,000 plug-in electric vehicles registered. As of December 2019, Norway had the largest European stock of plug-in cars and vans, and the third largest in the world after China and the U.S.

Norway was the top selling plug-in country market in Europe in 2016, surpassing the Netherlands, Europe's top market in 2015. Again in 2017 and 2018, Norway listed as the best selling European country market. In 2019, with more than 100,000 plug-in cars registered, Germany surpassed Norway as Europe's top selling plug-in electric country market, leading both the all-electric and the plug-in hybrid segments.

=== Used imports ===
Sales of used imports in Norway are significant, and as of December 2015, over 11,500 used plug-in vehicles imported from neighbouring countries had been registered, mainly pure electric cars. Registrations of used all-electric cars totalled 2,086 units in 2013, 3,063 in 2014 and 5,122 in 2015. In addition, about 1,300 used electric cars were imported into Norway before 2013.

By September 2014 most imports came from France, particularly the Nissan Leaf model. Just in 2015, Norwegians imported a total of 21,756 used cars in 2015, of which highly sought plug-in electric models topped the list of imported cars, the Nissan Leaf with 2,088 and the Kia Soul EV with 2,044, the latter, all imported from Germany.

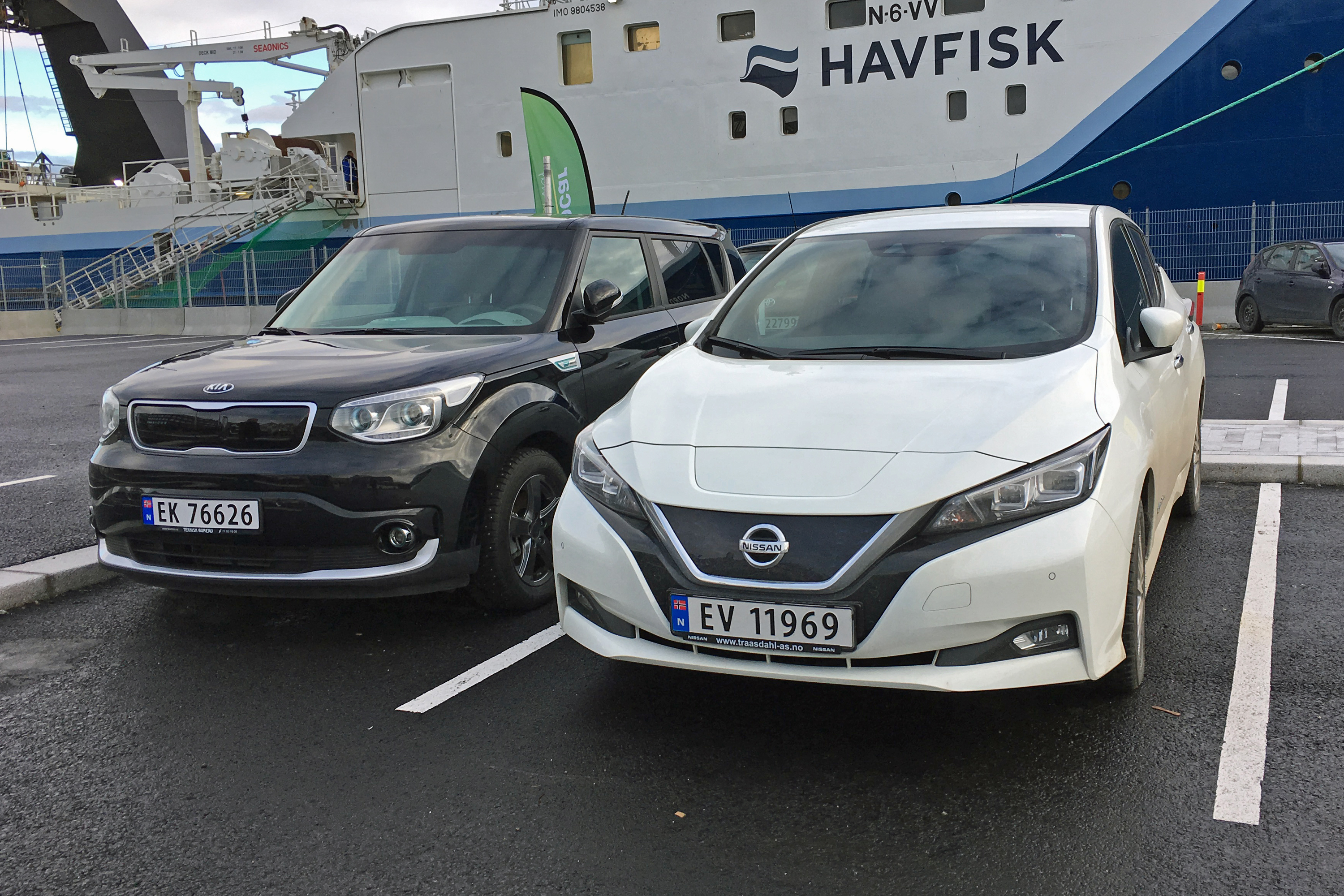
As of February 2021, the Nissan Leaf (right) and the Kia Soul EV (left) are the two most popular used imports in Norway.

A total of 5,281 used imported electric cars were registered in 2016, up 3.1% from 2015, with registrations led by two popular plug-in models, the Kia Soul (2,494) and the Nissan Leaf (2,112). In 2018, used imports represented 20% of all passenger car sales in the country. This phenomenon can be explained by the high demand for electric vehicles in Norway, and as manufacturers are unable to supply enough vehicles, there is a trend to import newly registered electric cars from other European countries. A number of second-hand electric vehicles from other countries are also imported in Norway because of their cheaper price relative to new vehicles.

As of 27 February 2021, cumulative registrations of used imports from neighbouring countries totalled 51,333 all-electric cars and utility vans, representing 13.8% of all light-duty pure electric vehicles ever registered in Norway. The most popular second hand import models are the Nissan Leaf with 19,281 units, Kia Soul EV with 13,464, VW e-Golf with 4,113, Fiat 500e with 1,615, BMW i3 with 1,445, Hyundai Ioniq with 1,399, Volkswagen e-Up! with 1,113, Nissan e-NV200 with 945, and Hyundai Kona EV with 902.

=== Market penetration ===
In March 2014, Norway became the first country where over one in every 100 registered passenger cars is plug-in electric, out of a fleet of over 2.52 million passenger cars. All-electric vehicles reached a market penetration of 1.02% of the total registered passenger fleet, and for the entire plug-in electric segment the market penetration increases to 1.07% when plug-in hybrids are accounted for.

In March 2015, the plug-in segment market penetration passed 2%, and the all-electric segment alone reached 2% of the country's 2.5 million registered passenger cars by late April 2015. The market penetration of the country's plug-in electric car segment passed 3% in December 2015. The all-electric segment achieved a market penetration of 3.5% in September 2016. As of 31 December 2016, plug-in cars represented 5% of the all passenger cars on Norwegians roads, and the 10% milestone was achieved in October 2018.

In April 2020, the stock of all-electric passenger cars represented 10% of all cars on the road in Norway, and during 2020, the fleet of plug-in electric cars passed the 15% mark. By the end of 2021 the market penetration was 22.1%, of which, 16.0% corresponds to battery electric cars in use.

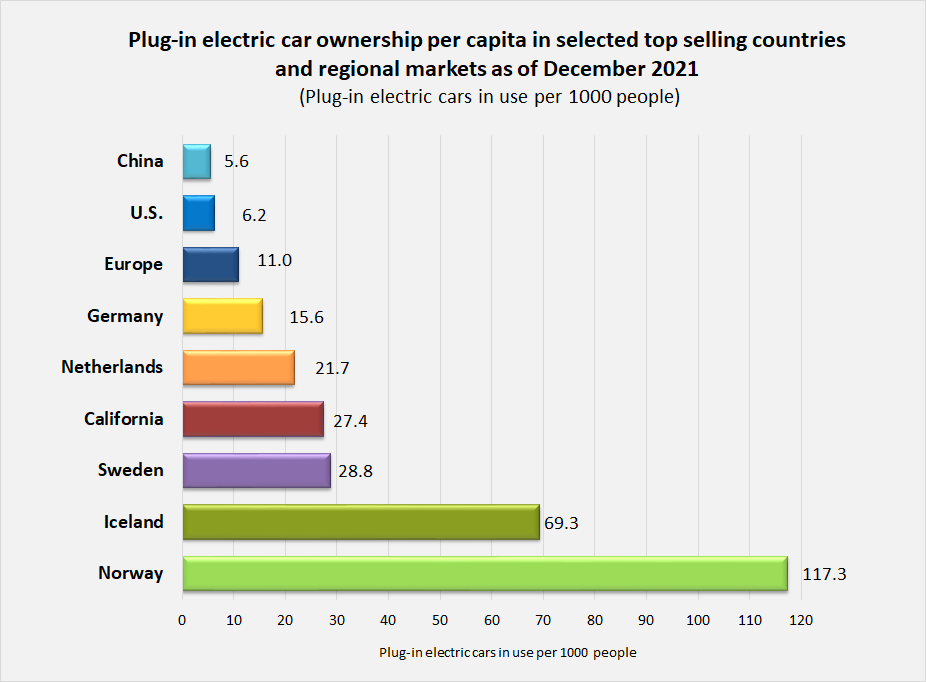
Comparison of Norway's ownership of plug-in electric cars per 1,000 people with other top selling plug-in car countries and regional markets, as of December 2021

=== Ownership per capita ===
Also, due to its population size, Norway is the country with the largest EV ownership per capita in the world, In 2013 the EV concentration reached four plug-in electric vehicles per 1,000 people in 2013, nine times higher than the U.S., the world's largest plug-in electric car market at the time. By July 2016, the market concentration had increased to 21.5 registered plug-in cars per 1,000 people, 3.6 times higher California's, the leading American market, and 14.2 times higher than the U.S. average concentration, then the world's largest country market.

=== Evolution of market share ===
The Norwegian plug-in electric car market share of new car sales is the highest in the world. The segment's market share rose from 1.6% in 2011, to 3.1% in 2012, and reached 5.6% in 2013. Only the Netherlands, with 5.34% in 2013, achieved a similar market share. In 2014 the overall plug-in car take rate climbed to 13.8%, and reached 22.4% in 2015. With a plug-in market share of 9.7% in 2015, the Netherlands had the world's second largest market share after Norway.

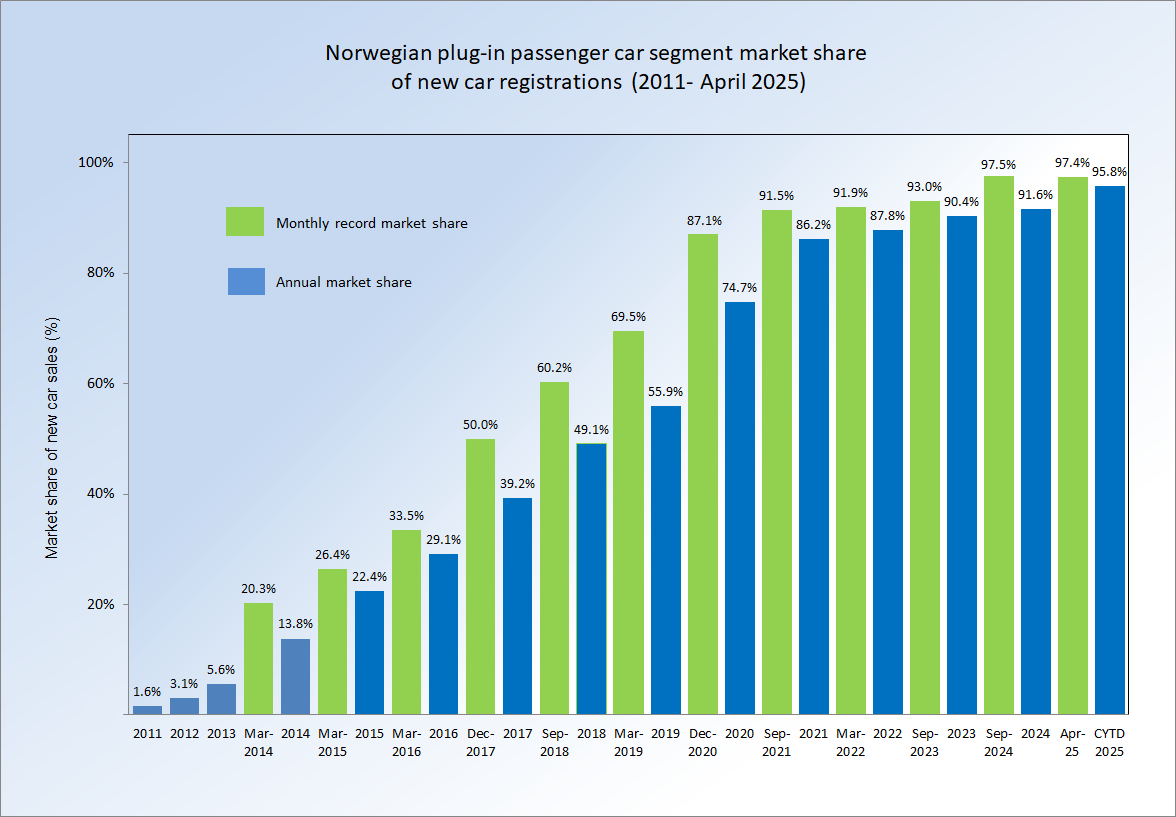
Historical evolution of the Norwegian plug-in electric car segment market share of annual new car sales and monthly records 2011-April 2025 (source OFV)

A record plug-in market share of 29.1% of new car sales was achieved in 2016. The all-electric segment register a market share of 15.7%, down from 17.1% in 2015, while the market share of plug-in hybrids rose to 13.4%. This result reflects a new trend in the Norwegian plug-in electric market that began in 2016, as annual sales and the market share of all-electric cars suffered a decline over the previous year, while the plug-in hybrid segment experienced significant growth.

A new monthly record was set in December 2017, when the plug-in car segment achieved 50% of new registrations. The plug-in segment again set a record market share in 2017 with 39.2% of new passenger cars registered, with 20.8% for the all-electric segment and 18.4% for plug-in hybrids. Adding conventional hybrids, the electrified segment for the first time ever surpassed the combined annual registrations of cars only powered by petrol or diesel, with a market share of 52.2% of new cars registrations in 2017.

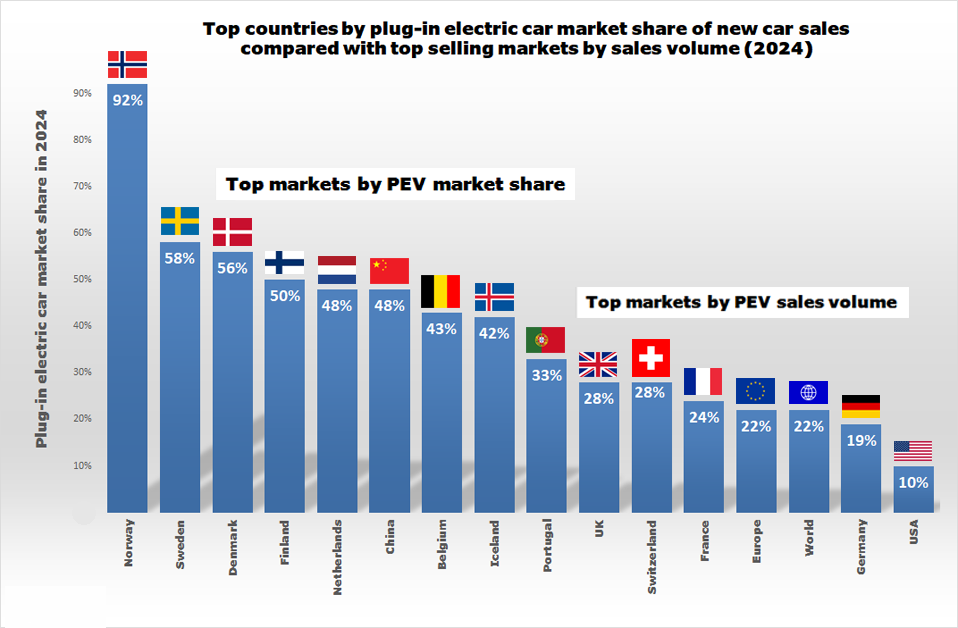
Norwegean plug-in car market share in 2024 compared with the uptake in other leading countries (Source: IEA)

The market share of the plug-in segment reached 49.1% in 2018, meaning that every second new passenger car sold in Norway in 2018 was a plug-in electric. According to a 2018 analysis by McKinsey & Company, the high market shares attained by Norway in last two years show that the country has reached a critical mass of electric vehicles, locating Norway in the third stage of a disruptive trend, meaning that the EV disruption is inevitable. According to McKinsey, except for China and Sweden, most other countries are still in the first stage of a disruptive trend. The study concludes that "Norway stands largely alone in its mass-market embrace of electric vehicles, so it provides a real-world picture of future EV sales proportions that developed markets could experience over the next five to ten years."

The take rate rose to 55.9% in 2019, and achieved a new record market share of 74.7% in 2020, 54.3% for the all-electric segment and 20.4% for plug-in hybrids. In September 2021, the combined market share of the plug-in car segment achieved a new record of 91.5% of new passenger car registrations, 77.5% for all-electric cars and 13.9% for plug-in hybrids, becoming the world's highest-ever monthly plug-in car market share attained by any country.

=== Sales records ===
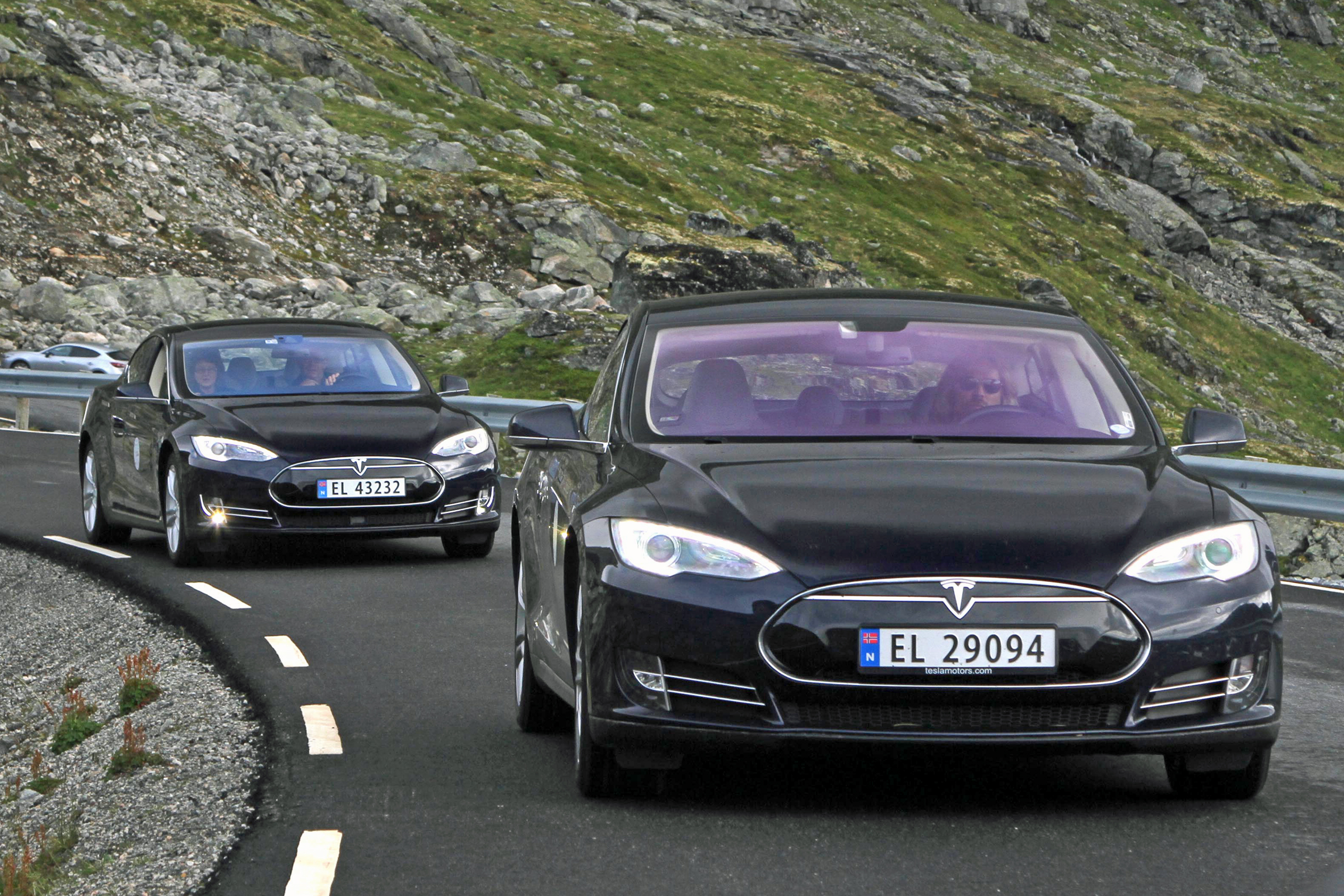
In March 2014, the Tesla Model S broke the 28-year-old Norwegian record for the highest monthly sales of a single model regardless of its power source.

Norway was the first country in the world where plug-in electric cars have been listed among its top 10 best selling new cars in a given month, and the first one to have all-electric cars topping the new car sales monthly ranking. Since 2013, plug-in cars have topped the new car sales monthly ranking nine times. The Tesla Model S has been the top selling new car four times, twice in 2013, first in September and again in December, and one more time in March 2014, and again in March 2015. The Nissan Leaf has topped the monthly new car sales ranking twice, first in October 2013 and again in January 2014. Both the Nissan Leaf and the Tesla Model S were listed among the Norwegian top 20 best selling new cars in 2013, with the Leaf ranking third with 4,604 units and a 3.2% market share; and the Model S ranking 20th with a 1.4% market share of new car sales in 2013.

In March 2014, the Tesla Model S also broke the 28-year-old record for monthly sales of a single model regardless of its power source, with 1,493 units sold, surpassing the Ford Sierra, which sold 1,454 units in May 1986. In July 2016, when new car registrations are break down by type of powertrain, for the first time a plug-in hybrid, the Mitsubishi Outlander P-HEV, listed as the top selling new car. In September 2016, the Tesla Model X ranked as the top selling new car model in Norway when registrations are broken down by type of powertrain. The BMW i3 was the top selling new passenger car in November 2016. In March 2019, the Tesla Model 3, with over 5,300 cars delivered, set the all-time record for monthly sales of a single passenger car model.

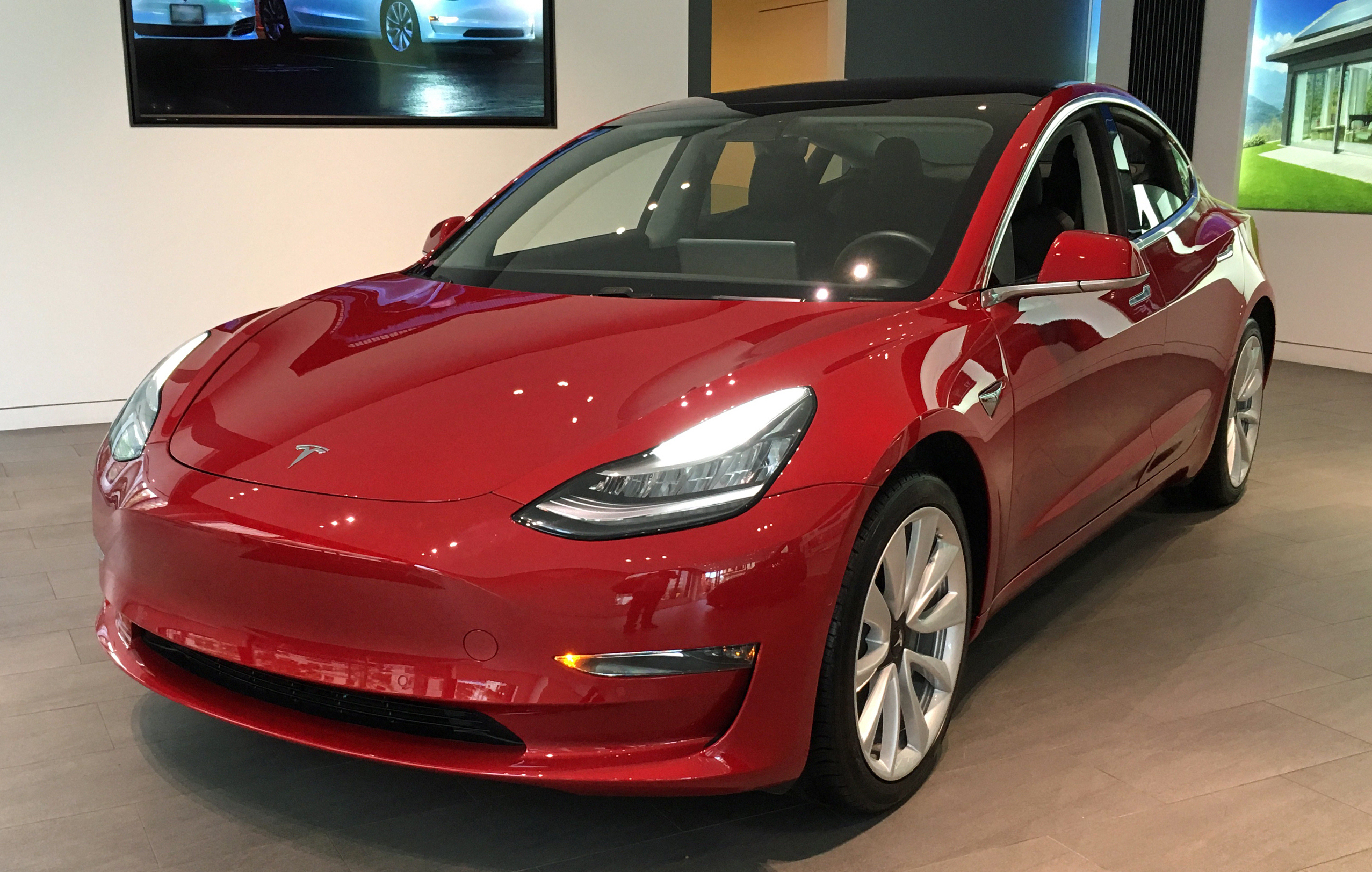
The Tesla Model 3 was the best selling car model in 2019, with a sales volume that is the third largest ever. Also in March 2019, the Model 3 set the all-time record for monthly sales of a single passenger car model.

Norway was also the first country in the world to have all-electric cars listed as the best selling passenger car model of the year, and for two consecutive years. First, the Nissan Leaf, with 12,303 units registered in 2018, was the country's best selling new passenger car model, marking the first time an electric car tops annual sales of the passenger car segment. Thereafter, the Tesla Model 3 topped annual passenger car sales in 2019 with 15,683 units registered. The sales volume achieved by the Model 3 in 2019 is the third largest in Norwegian history, exceeded only by the Volkswagen Bobla (Beetle) in 1969 (16,706), and Volkswagen Golf in 2015 (16,388).

The 53 year old VW Beetle annual sales record was surpassed by the Tesla Model Y with 17,572 sales registered in 2022.

Another record was set in 2018, as the top 5 best selling new passenger cars that year were all plug-in electric models, with the VW e-Golf ranking second (7,238) after the Leaf, followed by the BMW i3 (5,687), the Tesla Model X (4,981), and the Mitsubishi Outlander P-HEV (4,323). And again in 2019, the top 5 best selling passenger car models were all plug-in electric models, with the VW e-Golf ranking second (9,195 out of 10,125 of the entire Golf line-up), followed by the Nissan Leaf (6,127), the Audi e-tron (5,377), and the Mitsubishi Outlander P-HEV (5,048).

=== Sales by year ===
==== 2011–12 ====
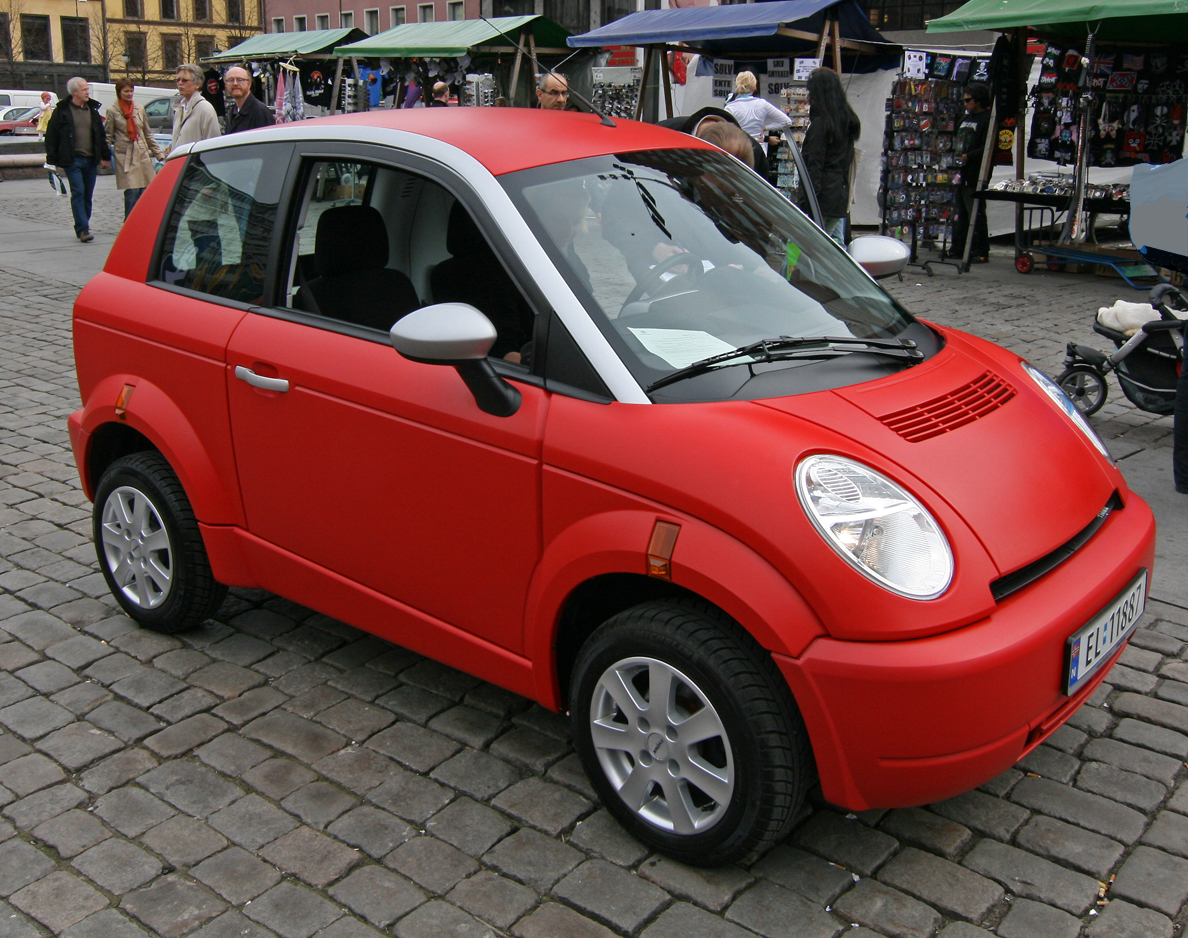
The Th!nk City was the all-time best-selling electric car in the Norwegian market until the end of 2011.

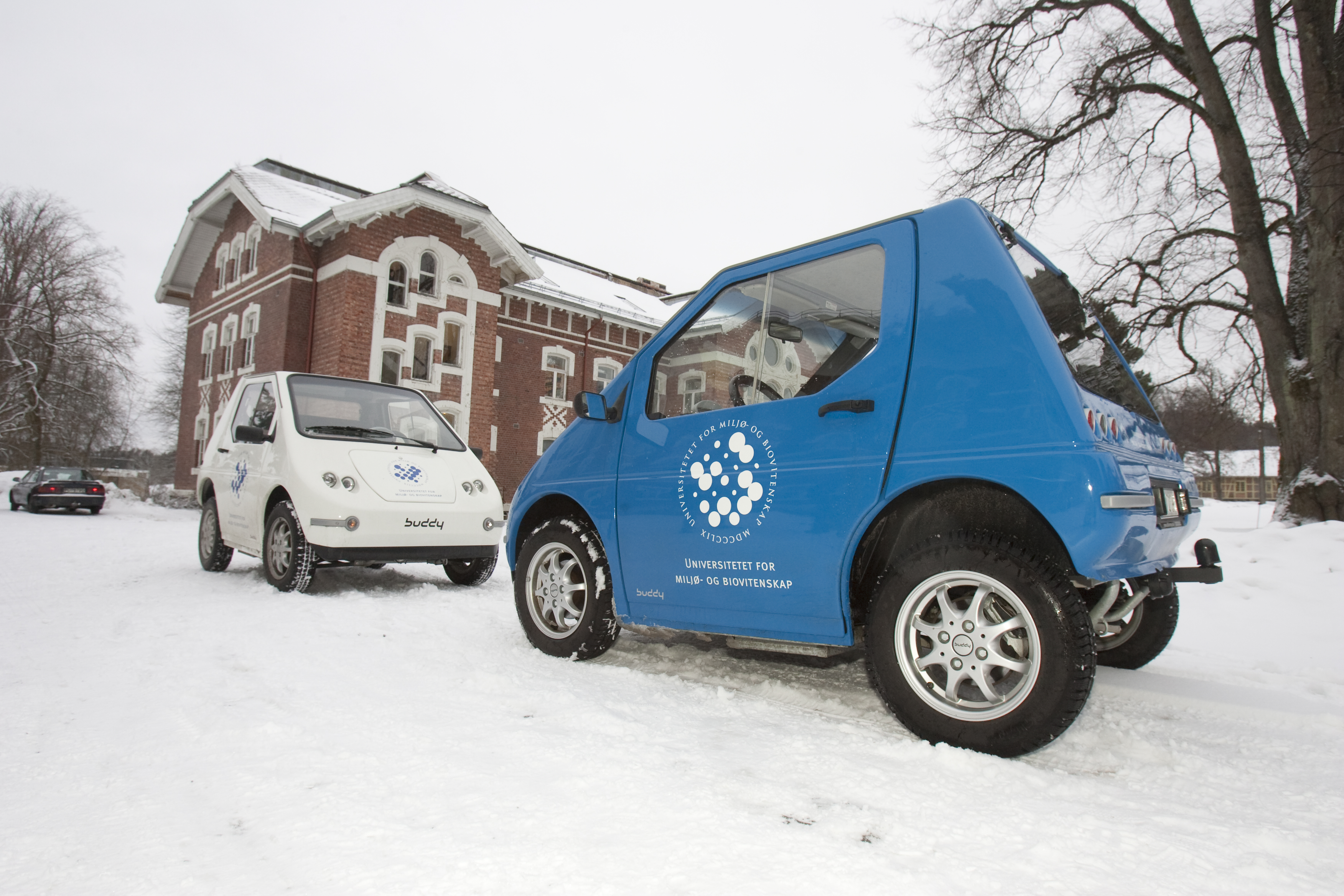
The Buddy was among the top selling electric cars in Norway until 2011.

A total of 2,240 electric cars were sold in 2011, up from 722 in 2010. A total of 5,411 electric cars and vans were registered in the country at the end of 2011. Sales in 2011 were led by the Mitsubishi i-MiEV family with 1,477 units including 1,050 i-MiEVs, 217 Peugeot iOns and 210 Citroën C-Zeros, together representing 66% of electric car sales in Norway that year. All-time registrations were led by the Th!nk City with 1,216 units registered at the end of 2011, followed by the Kewet/Buddy with 1,125 units and the Mitsubishi i-MiEV with 1,050 units.

At the end of the first quarter of 2012 the Th!nk City (1,205 units) was surpassed as the all-time top selling electric car by the Mitsubishi i-MiEV (1,223), while registrations during this quarter were dominated by the Nissan Leaf with over 600 units registered. Registrations totalled 4,679 plug-in electric cars in 2012, including 318 plug-in hybrids and 59 electric vans. Plug-in electric-drive sales in 2012 represented a 3.1% market share of passenger car sales in the country, up from 1.6% in 2011. Registrations in 2012 included 300 imported used electric vehicles, representing 1.0% of total used imports in the country. Among the top selling countries of all-electric cars in 2012, Norway ranked fifth with a 7% market share of global EV sales.

Sales in 2012 were led by the Nissan Leaf with 2,487 units registered, including 189 imported used Leafs, and Leaf sales represented 53% of the plug-in segment sales that year. Cumulative sales reached 2,860 Leafs since its launch in September 2011, accounting for more than 5% of the Leaf's global sales. Norway was the first country in the world where an electric car ranked among the top 10 best selling cars, as the Nissan Leaf ranked ninth in October new car sales, and ended 2012 in the 13th place, representing a market share of 1.7% of all new car sales in the country, up from 0.3% in 2011. The other top selling models in 2012 were the Mitsubishi i-MiEV with 672 units (7 used imports), Citroën C-Zero 560 (47 used imports), and Peugeot iOn 477 (47 used imports), for a total of 1,709 i MiEV family cars registered. Since 2009, the i-MiEV family sold 3,147 new electric cars through December 2012.

==== 2013 ====
Plug-in electric car registrations totalled 10,769 units in 2013, of which used imports represented 20%. Total registrations included 387 plug-in hybrids and 355 all-electric light commercial vans, together representing 6.9% of total 2013 registrations, and reflecting the continued dominance of pure electric vehicles in the Norwegian market. The plug-in electric segment in Norway grew 129% from 2012 to 2013, achieving the second highest growth rate in the world after the Netherlands (338%).

As of 30 September 2013, the total plug-in electric registered stock included over 2,500 heavy quadricycles, such as the Kewet/Buddy (1,087), Th!nk City (1,120), and the REVAi (299). These city cars are entitled to the special "EL" licensed plate reserved for Norwegian electric vehicles.

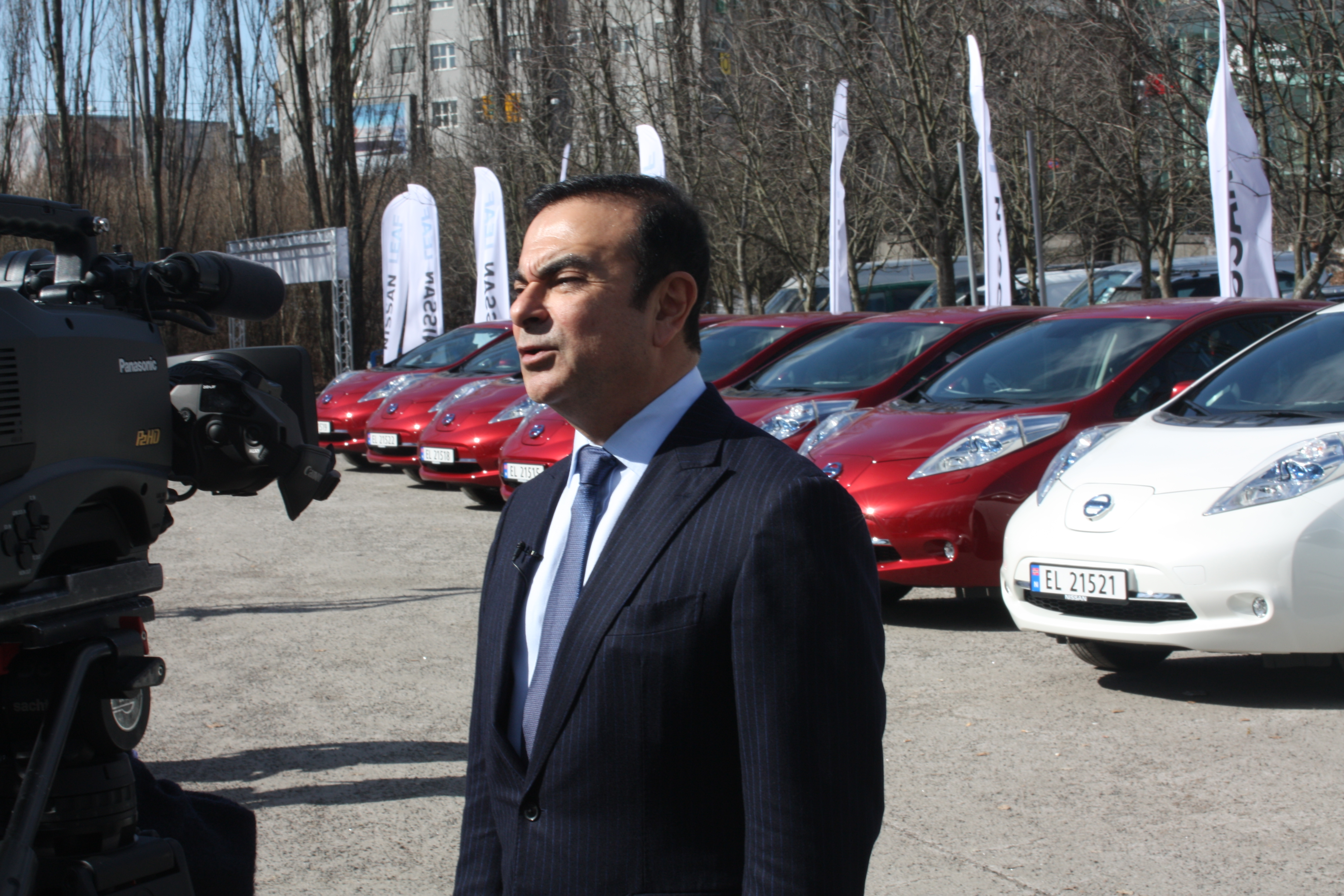
Nissan Renault CEO Carlos Ghosn visited Norway to launch the 2013 model Leaf. Since 2012 the Nissan Leaf is the all-time top-selling plug-in electric car in Norway.

The Nissan Leaf continued leading the Norwegian plug-in market with 4,604 new units sold in 2013, representing 58.4% of all plug-in car sales. The Tesla Model S ranked second with 1,986 units (25.2%), followed by the Volkswagen e-Up! with 580 units (7.4%). Since September 2011, a total of 7,275 new Leaf cars have been sold in the country through December 2013. Accounting for used Leafs imported from neighbouring countries, of which, 1,608 units were registered during 2013, a total of 9,080 Leafs have been registered in Norway through December 2013, representing 9.4% of the 96,847 Leafs delivered worldwide through December 2013. The Toyota Prius Plug-in Hybrid was top selling plug-in hybrid in 2013 with 184 units, followed by the Opel Ampera and Volvo V60 Plug-in Hybrid, both with 94 units.

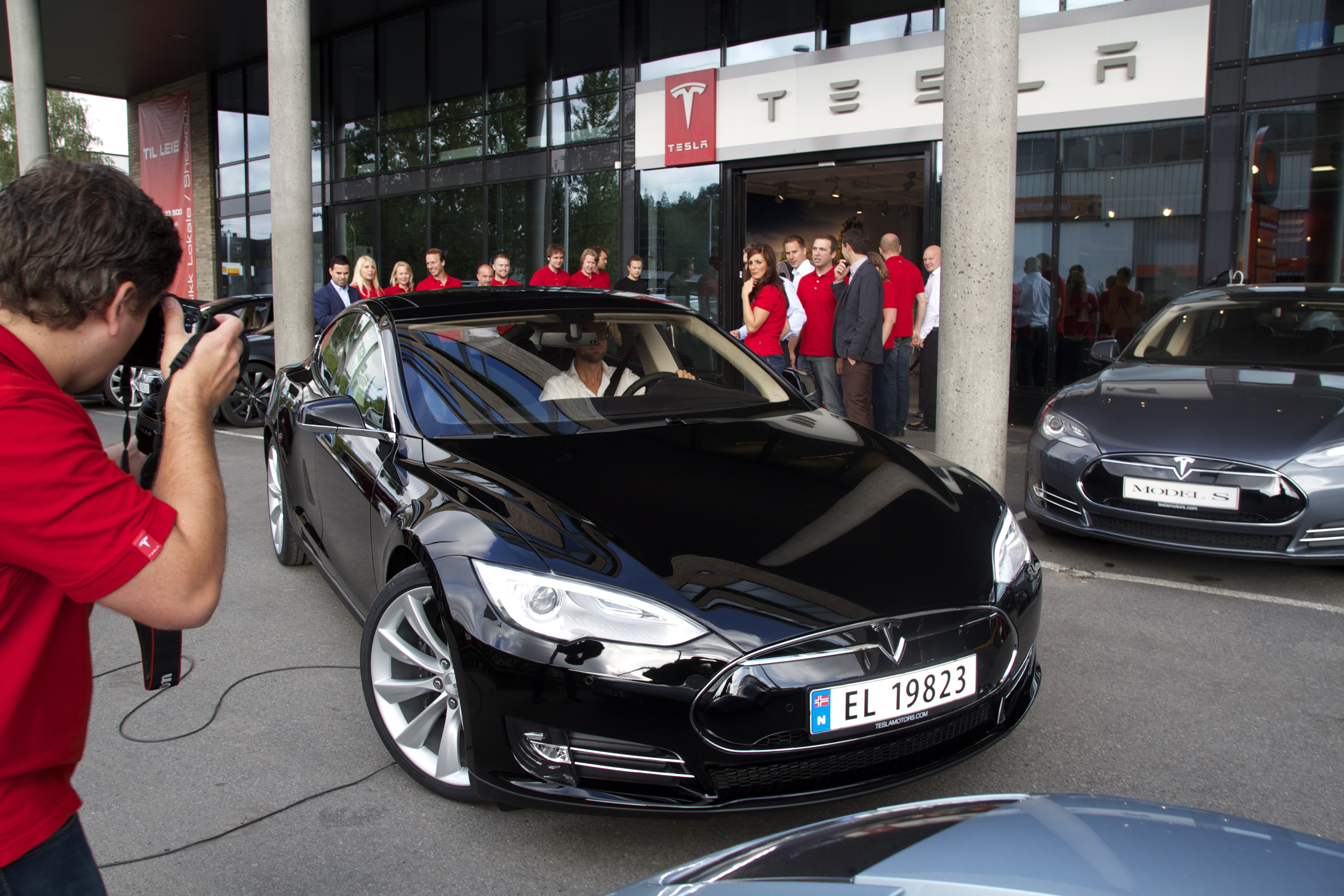
The first European deliveries of the Tesla Model S took place at Tesla's store in Oslo in August 2013.

Tesla Model S deliveries began in Oslo on 7 August 2013, it was the first European retail delivery of a Model S. The first Model S was delivered to Frederic Hauge, a Norwegian environmental activist. Model S sales together with record Leaf sales, allowed the electric car segment to reach its best monthly sales and a record 6.0% market share of new passenger car sales in August 2013. Model S sales surged in September 2013, with a total of 616 units delivered, making the Tesla Model S the top selling car in Norway during this month, representing a market share of 5.1% of all the new cars sold in the country, and contributing to a record 8.6% market share for all-electric vehicle sales during September. The share climbs to 9.0% when plug-in hybrids and electric vans are accounted for. According to Reuters, the demand for the Model S is so high that there was a five-month waiting list, and as a result of the shortage, a used market has appeared.

In October 2013 an all-electric car was the best selling car in the country for a second month in a row. This time was the Nissan Leaf with 716 units sold, representing a 5.6% of new car sales. In December 2013, with 553 units sold and a 4.9% market share, the Model S was the top selling new car in the country for the second time in 2013. A total of 1,986 new Model S cars were sold through December 2013, allowing Tesla's electric car to rank as the second top selling electric vehicle in 2013 after the Nissan Leaf. According to Elon Musk, by the end of 2013 Norway became Tesla's largest per capita sales market for the Model S, together with Switzerland.

==== 2014 ====
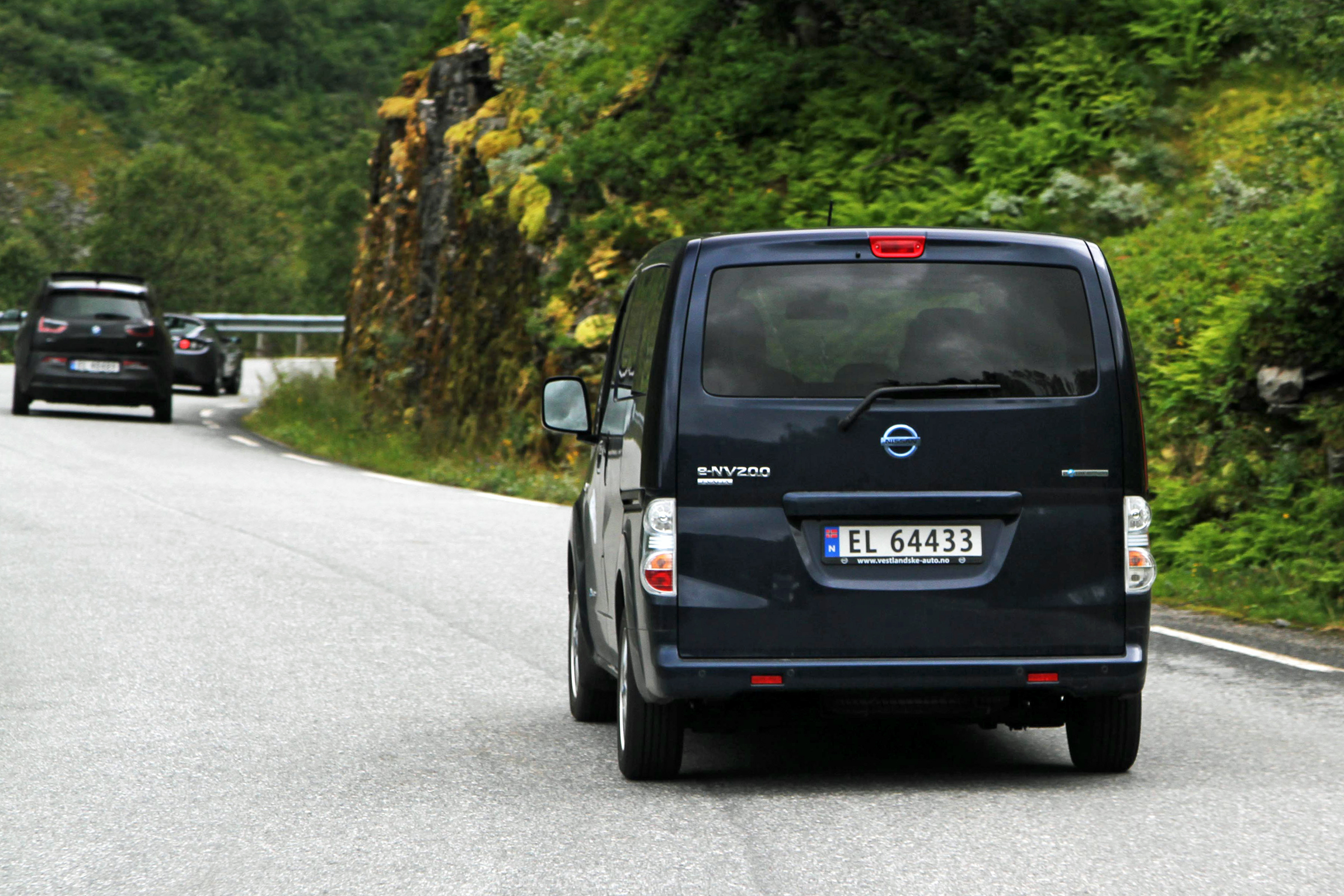
The all-electric Nissan e-NV200 van was released in Norway in 2014.

A total of 23,390 plug-in electric vehicles were registered in Norway in 2014, consisting of 18,094 new all-electric cars, 3,063 used imported all-electric cars, 1,678 new plug-in hybrid cars and 555 new all-electric vans. Combined sales of new and used plug-in electric vehicles captured a 13.84% market share of total passenger car registrations in 2014. The new all-electric car segment reached a market share of 12.5%. New all-electric passenger car registrations were up 129.5% from 2013, and the plug-in hybrid segment grew 411.6% from a year earlier. Norway was the top selling European country with 18,649 passenger cars and utility vans registered, representing a third of all European all-electric car sales in 2014.

In January 2014, the Leaf topped for a second time the ranking of top selling new cars in Norway, with 650 units sold, representing a 5.7% of new car sales that month. Nissan Leaf registrations passed the 10,000 unit milestone in February 2014. The Model S topped the monthly sales ranking for a third time in March 2014, with 1,493 units sold, capturing a 10.8% market share of new car sales that month, and contributing to a record market share for the all-electric car segment of 20.3% of total new car sales. The monthly market share of the plug-in electric car segment set a new record in January 2014, 18.0% for all-electric cars and 3.1% for plug-in hybrids, for a combined market share of 21.1% of total new car registrations.

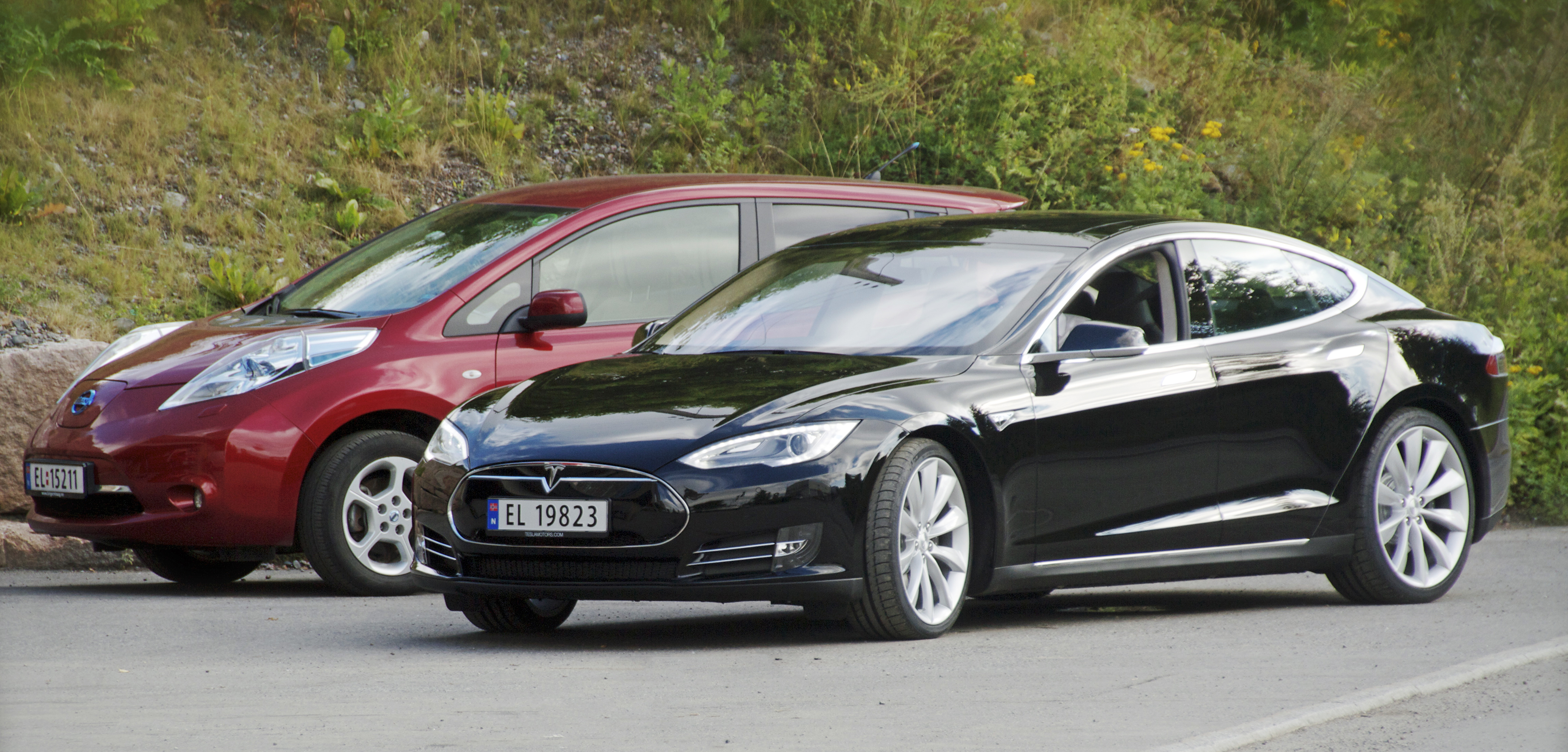
The Nissan Leaf (left) and the Tesla Model S (right) were the two best selling plug-in electric cars in Norway in 2014.

A total of 2,056 Model S cars were sold during the first quarter of 2014, making the Model S the best selling new car in Norway during 2014 so far, capturing a 5.6% market share of new car sales. The Renault Zoe was officially launched in the Norwegian market in April 2014, and unlike other European countries, the Zoe is sold with the battery pack included.

During the first half of 2014, the Model S, with 3,136 units sold, ranked as the second best selling new car in Norway with a market share of 4.3% of new car sales; and also was the top selling plug-in electric car, with a 33.5% share of the all-electric segment sales. The Leaf, with 2,665 units, ranked fourth among the top selling new cars, capturing a 3.7% market share of new car sales; and listed as the second top selling plug-in car after the Model S, with a share of 28.5% of the all-electric segment sales. The other top selling plug-in cars were the Volkswagen e-Up! with 1,551 units and 16.6% share of the all-electric segment; the BMW i3 with 1,159 units, including sales of the variant with the range-extender (REx) option, and captured a 12.4% share of the all-electric segment. The recently released Volkswagen e-Golf was the top selling plug-in electric car in July 2014 with 391 units sold and representing 34.4% of the Golf nameplate sales (1,136), which was country's top selling new car that month. The e-Golf was again the top selling plug-in electric car in August 2014 with 467 units sold, representing 43.4% of the Golf nameplate sales that month (1,075). In two months and a half a total of 925 Volkswagen e-Golf cars have been sold, surpassing initial Model S sales which delivered 805 units during its first two months in the Norwegian market.

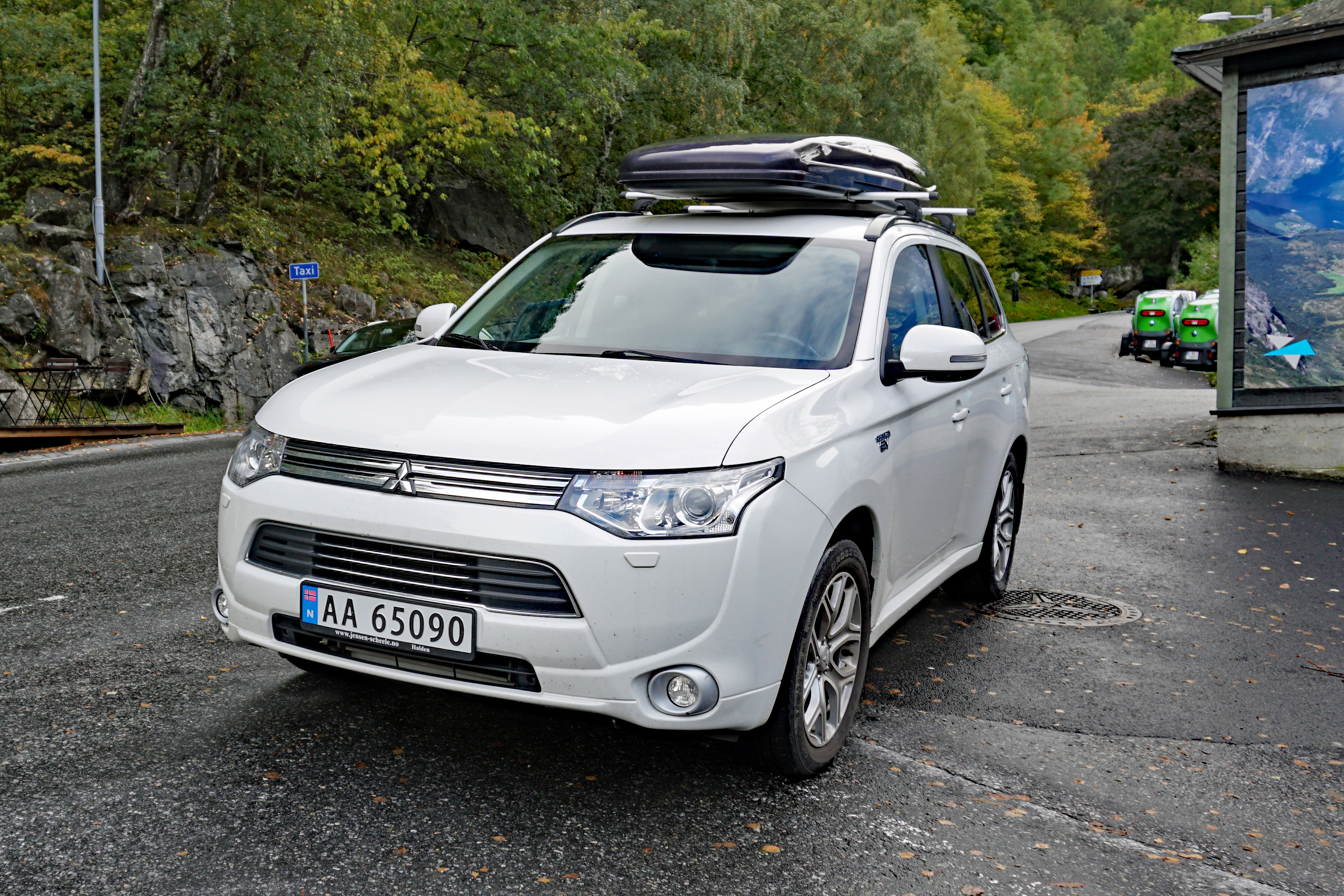
The Mitsubishi Outlander P-HEV was the top selling plug-in hybrid in Norway in 2014.

Sales of plug-in hybrids increased significantly during the first half of 2014, with 856 units sold. Sales were driven by the Mitsubishi Outlander P-HEV with 818 units sold between January and June 2014, representing 95.6% of the Norwegian plug-in hybrid segment. Only 25 Volvo V60 Plug-in Hybrids, 21 Prius PHVs and 15 Amperas were sold during this period. The Outlander plug-in version represented almost 54% of the 1,523 Outlanders sold in Norway in the first half of 2014. The Outlander P-HEV passed the 1,000 unit mark in August 2014.

Plug-in electric car sales in 2014 were led by the Nissan Leaf with 4,781 new registrations, followed by Tesla Model S with 4,040 units. The Leaf ended 2014 as the third top selling new car in Norway. The top selling plug-in hybrid in 2014 was the Mitsubishi Outlander P-HEV with 1,485 units sold, out of almost 1,700 plug-in hybrids sold in the country that year.

As of December 2014, a total of 12,056 new Leafs had been sold in the country. In addition, there were 3,626 used imported Leafs registered in the country as of 30 September 2014. With about 16,000 units registered including used imports, the Leaf ranks as the country's all-time top selling electric car, representing 39% of the country's all-electric registered fleet. The Tesla Model S, released in August 2013, ranks second with cumulative sales of 6,023 new units up until December 2014, with about 14% of the total registered plug-in electric vehicle stock. As of July 2014, Norway is the Model S largest overseas market, with an average of 436 sedans sold per month since August 2013.

==== 2015 ====
Record registrations and the highest monthly market share ever were registered in March 2015, with 3,391 new all-electric cars sold that month representing 23.4% of new car sales, and 357 plug-in hybrids representing a market share of 2.52% that month, together reaching a combined PEV market share of 26.4%. In addition, a total of new 73 all-electric vans and 320 all-electric used import cars were registered in March 2015, raising total March registrations of light-duty plug-in vehicles to 4,141 units. March sales set another record, with three all-electric cars ranking as the top 3 selling new cars in the country, the Tesla Model S with 1,140 units, the Volkswagen e-Golf with 956 (out of a total of 1,421 units sold by the Golf nameplate), and the Nissan Leaf with 526.

A total of 39,632 light-duty plug-in electric vehicles were registered in Norway in 2015, up from 23,408 in 2014 (69.3%). New plug-in sales totalled 34,455 units, consisting of 25,779 pure electric cars, 7,964 plug-in hybrids, and 712 all-electric utility vans. A total of 5,177 used imports were registered, consisting of 5,122 used imported pure electric cars and 55 vans. The combined sales of new plug-in cars reached a market share of 22.4% of all new passenger cars sold in 2015, with the all-electric car segment reaching 17.1%, up from 12.5% in 2014, while the plug-in hybrid segment reached 5.2%, up from 1% in 2014.

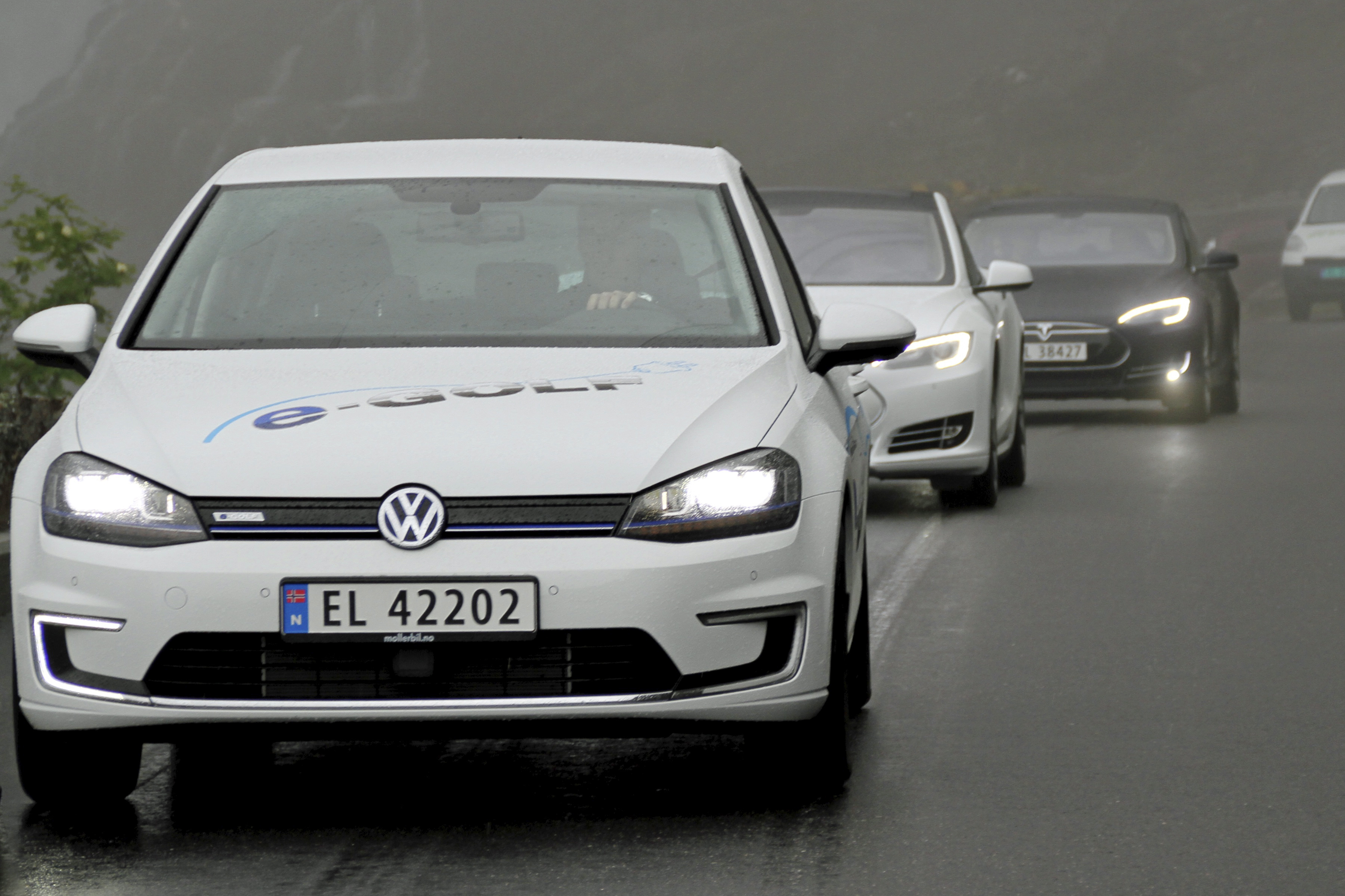
The Volkswagen e-Golf was the best-selling plug-in electric car in Norway in 2015.

The VW e-Golf, with 8,943 units sold, was the best-selling plug-in electric car in Norway in 2015, representing 34.7% of the plug-in segment sales, ahead of the Tesla Model S (4,039) and the Nissan Leaf (3,189). The e-Golf variant represented 54.6% of total new VW Golf nameplate sales in the country in 2015. For the second year running, the Mitsubishi Outlander P-HEV was top selling plug-in hybrid in 2015 with 2,875 units, becoming the all-time top selling plug-in hybrid in the country, with 4,360 units registered since 2014. In 2015, the Outlander was followed by the Volkswagen Golf GTE with 2,000 units, and the Audi A3 e-tron with 1,684 units, together representing 84% of the plug-in hybrid segment sales in 2015.

As of December 2015, the Nissan Leaf continued as the all-time best selling plug-in electric car in the country with a total of 15,245 new Leafs registered since 2011. In addition, a significant number of used imported Leafs from neighbouring countries have been registered in the country, raising the stock of registered Leafs to over 20,000 units, meaning that more than 10% of Leafs sold in the world are on Norwegian roads by November 2015. Ranking second is the Volkswagen e-Golf, with 10,961 new units registered since 2014, followed by the Tesla Model S, with 10,062 new units registered in Norway through December 2015, representing about 10% of the Model S global sales.

==== 2016 ====
A total of 50,875 plug-in electric vehicles were registered in Norway in 2016, consisting of 24,222 new electric cars, 5,281 used imported all-electric cars, 20,663 new plug-in hybrid cars, 607 new all-electric vans, and 102 used imported all-electric vans. New light-duty plug-in registrations totalled 45,492 plug-in cars and vans registered. with new plug-in passenger car registrations were up 32% from 2015. Registrations of new plug-in cars reached a market share of 29.1% of all new passenger cars registered in 2016, with the all-electric car segment reaching 15.7%, down from 17.1% in 2015, and the plug-in hybrid segment climbed to 13.4%, up from 5.3% in 2015. When conventional hybrids sales are accounted for, the combined market share of the electric-drive segment achieved 40.2% of new passenger car sales in 2016.

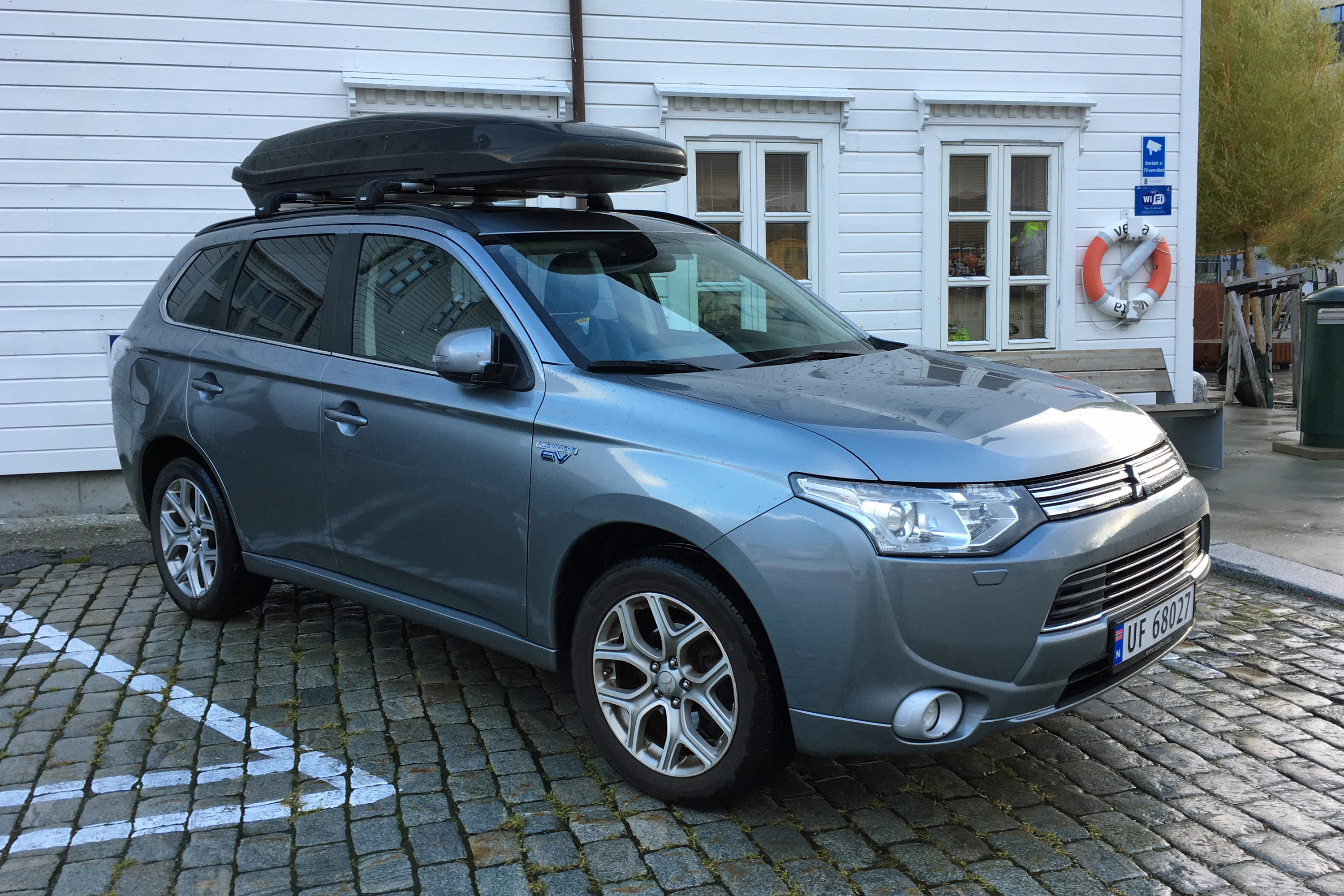
The Mitsubishi Outlander was the top selling plug-in car in 2016, the first time ever a plug-in hybrid topped the Norwegian list of best selling plug-in electric cars.

The stock of light-duty plug-in electric vehicles registered in Norway passed the 100,000 unit milestone in April 2016, making Norway the country with the fourth largest stock of plug-in cars and vans in the world after China, the U.S. and Japan, and also the European country with largest stock of light-duty plug-in vehicles. Registrations of light-duty all-electric vehicles achieved the 100,000 unit milestone in December 2016, with three models, the Nissan Leaf, Tesla Model S and Volkswagen e-Golf, accounting for more than half of total stock of pure electric cars on Norwegian roads at the end of November 2016. Norway was the best selling plug-in country in Europe in 2016, surpassing the Netherlands, Europe's top market in 2015.

The Outlander PHEV ended 2016 listed as the best selling plug-in car in Norway with 5,136 units sold, the first time ever a plug-in hybrid topped the Norwegian list of top selling plug-in electric cars. Ranking next were the Volkswagen e-Golf (4,705), Volkswagen Golf GTE (4,337), Nissan Leaf (4,162), and BMW i3 (3,953). Registrations of used imports were led by the Kia Soul (2,494) and the Nissan Leaf (2,112). When new car sales in 2016 are breakdown by powertrain or fuel, nine of the top ten best-selling models were electric-drive models: three plug-in hybrids, three battery electric cars, three conventional hybrids, and only one diesel-powered car.

A record market share for the plug-in electric passenger segment was achieved in March 2016 with 33.5% of new car sales; the all-electric car segment had an 18.7% market share among new passenger cars, while the plug-in hybrid segment had a 14.8%. Also in March 2016, combined sales of the Golf plug-in variants totalled 1,216 units out of 1,411 new Golf nameplate units registered that month, representing 86.2% of the model total registrations.

When new car registrations in July 2016 are broken down by type of powertrain, a total of five plug-in cars ranked among the top 10 best selling new cars in Norway that month, with the Mitsubishi Outlander P-HEV ranking for the first time as the top selling new car with 504 units registered in July 2016. Ranking next were the Volkswagen Golf GTE (412), Volkswagen Passat GTE (294), Volkswagen e-Golf (279), and Nissan Leaf (237). By the end of August 2016, about 90,000 pure electric vehicles have been registered in the country, including used imports, triggering the introduction of the new "EK" special licence plate series dedicated to all-electric vehicles.

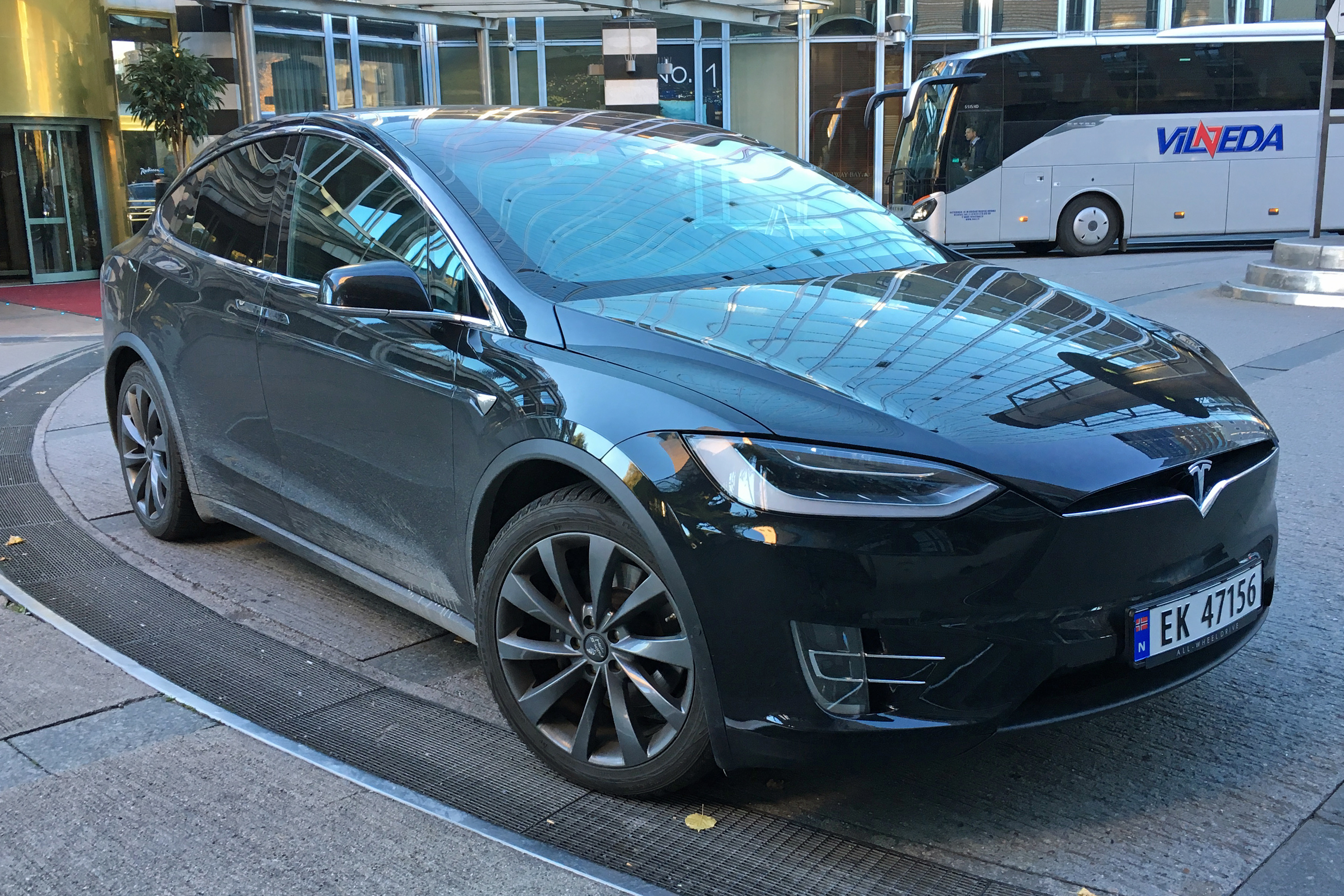
The Tesla Model X was the top selling new car model in Norway in September 2016.

The VW Golf nameplate led new car registrations in September 2016 with 996 units, followed by the Tesla Model X with 601 and the BMW i3 with 520. However, when Golf family sales are broken down by each variant's powetrain, the all-electric e-Golf registered 392 units, the Golf GTE plug-in hybrid 358, and the internal combustion-powered Golf 242 units. Therefore, the Model X not only led sales in the plug-in electric segment, but also was the top selling new car model in September 2016. In addition, when models are ranked considering their powertrain, a total of five plug-in cars ranked among the top 10 best selling new cars in Norway that month. In addition to the Model X and the i3, the other top selling plug-in models were the Mitsubishi Outlander P-HEV (427), Volkswagen e-Golf (392), and Volkswagen Golf GTE (358). Again in November 2016, an electric car topped new cars sales in the country. The BMW i3 listed as the top selling new passenger car model with 1,014 units registered, capturing a market share of 7.7% of new car sales that month.

As of 30 December 2016, the Nissan Leaf remains as the all-time best selling plug-in electric car in the country with a total of 19,407 new Leafs registered since 2011. When used imported Leafs are accounted for, there were 27,115 Leafs on Norwegian roads at the end of November 2016. Ranking second is the VW e-Golf with 16,216 units registered followed by the Tesla Model S with 11,878 units. As of December 2016, the Outlander PHEV is the all-time top selling plug-in hybrid car with 9,499 new units registered since 2013.

==== 2017 ====
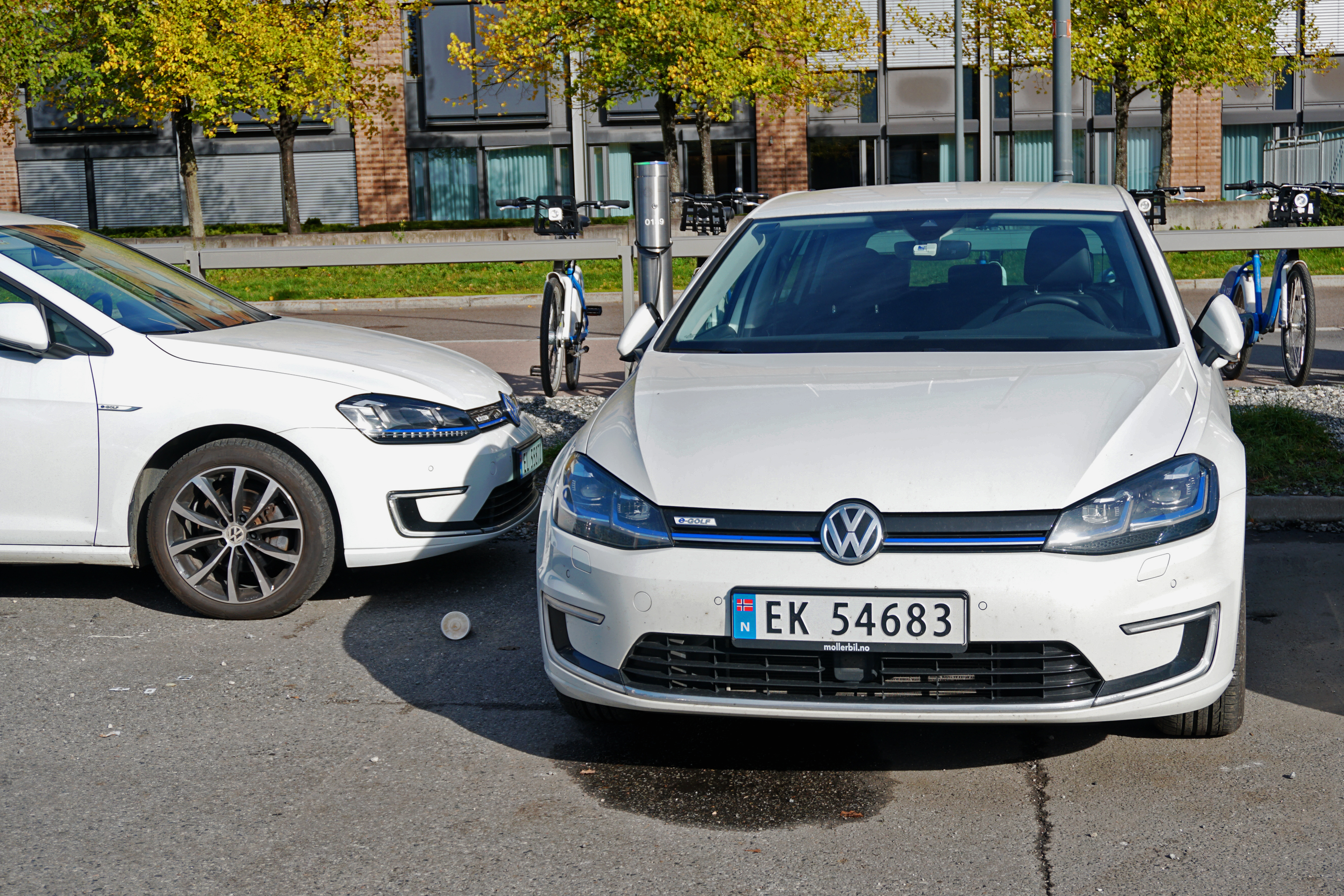
The Volkswagen e-Golf was the best-selling plug-in electric car in 2017, and also led new car sales in the country, regardless of powertrain.

A record monthly market share for the plug-in electric passenger segment was achieved in January 2017 with 37.5% of new car sales; the plug-in hybrid segment had a 20.0% market share of new passenger cars, while the all-electric car segment had 17.5%. In January 2017 the electrified segment for the first time ever surpassed combined sales of cars with a diesel or petrol engine. Sales of plug-in hybrids, all-electric cars and conventional hybrids achieved a market share of 51.4% of new car sales that month. Another market share record was set in December 2017, when the combined plug-in segment achieved 50% of new registrations, 27.6% for all-electric cars and 22.4% for plug-in hybrids. When conventional hybrids are accounted for, the electrified segment achieved a record 58.4% of new car registrations that month.

A total of 71,737 plug-in electric vehicles were registered in Norway in 2017, consisting of 33,025 new electric cars, 8,558 used imported all-electric cars, 29,236 new plug-in hybrid cars, 742 new all-electric vans, and 176 used imported all-electric vans. Additionally, 55 new zero emissions hydrogen cars were registered in 2017. The all-electric segment market share was 20.8% and the plug-in hybrid car segment was 18.4%, for a combined market share of 39.2% of new passenger cars registered in 2017. Adding conventional hybrids, the electrified segment for the first time ever in any country surpassed annual registrations of cars only powered by [petrol] or diesel, with a market share of 52.1% of new cars registrations in 2017.

The Volkswagen e-Golf was the best-selling plug-in electric car with 6,639 new units registered, followed by the BMW i3 with 5,035 (plus one unit with range-extender), and the Tesla Model X with 4,748 units. The Mitsubishi Outlander P-HEV ended 2017 with 4,067 new units registered, and rises to around 6,500 when used imports are accounted for. These sales results allow the Outlander P-HEV to rank as the top selling plug-in hybrid in 2017, and the Norwegian segment's top selling model for four years running (2014–2017). It is the all-time top selling PHEV with 13,566 new units sold as of December 2017.

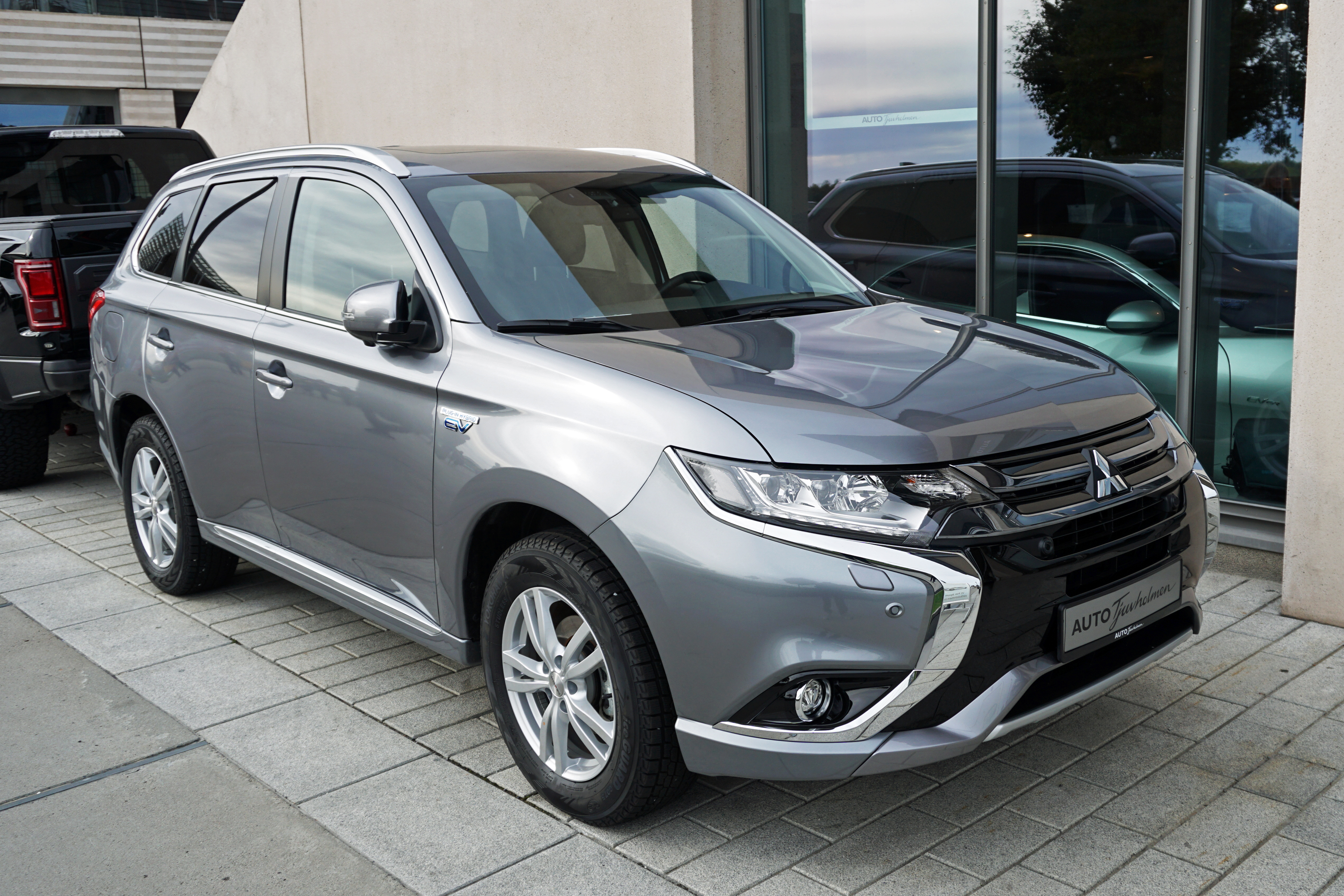
The Mitsubishi Outlander P-HEV has been the top selling plug-in hybrid for four years running (2014–2017), and, as of December 2017, also ranked as the all-time top selling plug-in hybrid.

Among the top 20 best selling new cars in Norway in 2017, half were plug-in passenger cars: six all-electric cars and four plug-in hybrids. The Volkswagen e-Golf was the country's top selling new car in 2017, and the BMW i3 the second best selling new car. The Tesla Model X ranked fourth overall. The complete Volkswagen Golf line-up was the top selling new car in 2017, completing ten consecutive years as the leading model in the Norwegian market, but 54.6% were electric models (e-Golf) and 20% were plug-in hybrids (Golf GTE), as a result, 3 out of 4 new VW Golf cars registered in 2017 had a plug.

As of December 2017, and accounting for both new and used imports registrations, a total of 141,951 all-electric passenger cars and vans, and 67,171 plug-in hybrids have been registered in the country since 2010. The registered plug-in stock included almost 2,700 all-electric vans. Registration of used imports totalled 20,944 cars in 2017, mostly imported from European countries. Many of these imports were registered in their country of origin and shortly after shipped to Norway. A large proportion were electric cars, such as the Nissan Leaf and Kia Soul, and plug-in hybrids, mainly Mitsubishi Outlander. Accounting for total registrations, that is, including used imports, a total of 13 plug-in cars ranked among the top 20 best selling new cars in Norway in 2017, seven pure electrics and six plug-in hybrids. The list was completed by three conventional hybrids and three diesel-powered automobiles. Among the top 10, none was exclusively powered by an internal combustion engine, seven were plug-in cars and three conventional hybrids. The top four positions were occupied by plug-in models: VW e-Golf, Nissan Leaf, Mitsubishi Outlander P-HEV and BMW i3 all-electric. The Toyota RAV4 Hybrid was fifth.

As of December 2017, two Norwegian cities are listed among the world's top 25 cities with the largest plug-in electric vehicle markets, accounting for 44% of the world's stock of plug-in electric cars, Oslo with about 75,000 vehicles and Bergen with about 40,000. The top 25 list is led by Shanghai with cumulative sales of over 162,000 electric vehicles, followed by Beijing with 147,000 and Los Angeles with 143,000. Among the 25 cities, Bergen has the highest market share of the plug-in segment, with about 50% of new car sales in 2017, followed by Oslo with 40%.

==== 2018 ====
In September 2018, the market share of all-electric cars reached 45.3% and plug-in hybrids 14.9%, for a combined market share of the plug-in car segment of 60.2% of new car registrations that month, becoming the world's highest-ever monthly market share for the plug-in electric passenger segment in Norway, and in any country. The market share for diesel-powered cars fell to 12.4% of new registrations and for petrol cars was 16.1%. Accounting for conventional hybrids, the electrified segment achieved a record 71.5% market share in September 2018. The plug-in electric passenger car market share continued above 55% in October and November 2018, and totalled 49.1% in 2018.

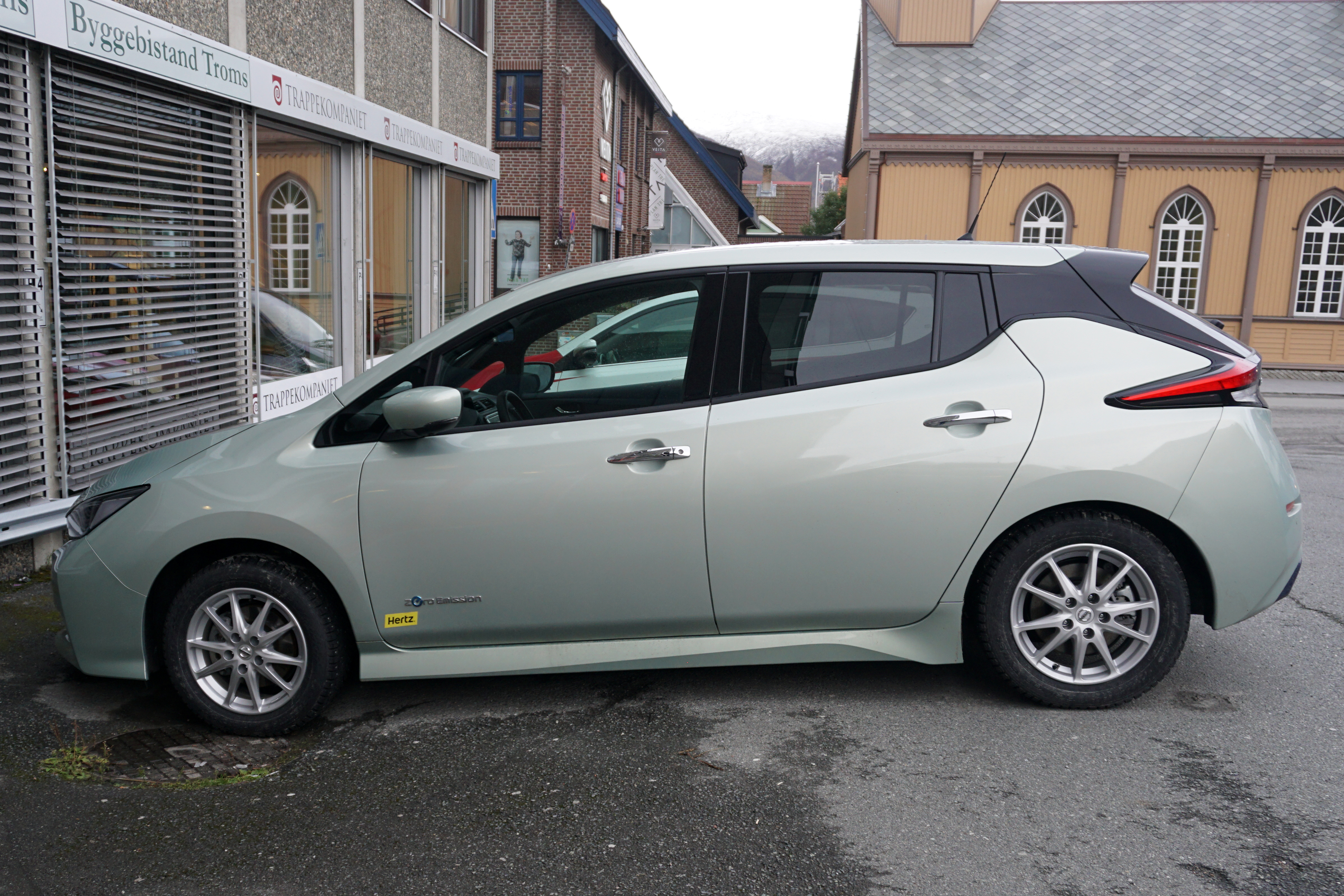
As of December 2018, the Nissan Leaf listed as the all-time most popular plug-in car in Norway with 25% of total all-electric car registrations.

In October 2018, Norway became the first country where 1 in every 10 passenger cars registered is a plug-in electric vehicle. The 200,000th all-electric vehicle was registered in December 2018. As of 31 December 2018, Norway's stock of passenger cars totalled 2.7 million units registered, of which, 7.2% were all-electric passenger cars, and 3.5% were plug-in hybrid cars. Conventional hybrid cars represented 3.9% of the total stock, for the electrified segment accounting for 14.6% of all cars on Norwegian roads.

The Nissan Leaf, with 12,303 units registered in 2018, was both the country's best selling new passenger car model, and the top selling plug-in electric car, marking the first time an electric car tops annual sales of the passenger car segment. Also, the top 5 best selling new passenger cars in 2018 were all plug-in electric models, with the VW e-Golf ranking second (7,238), followed by the BMW i3 (5,687), the Tesla Model X (4,981), and the Mitsubishi Outlander P-HEV (4,323). In addition, among the top 10 best selling new car models, seven were plug-in electric cars (Tesla Model S and Renault Zoe in addition to the top 5), two were conventional hybrids (Toyota Yaris and RAV4), and one model with multiple powertrains (Volvo XC60).

As of March 2018, the Mitsubishi Outlander P-HEV remained as the top selling plug-in hybrid with 14,196 new units sold. The Nissan Leaf continued to be the most popular model in the plug-in segment with 49,823 units registered by early December 2018, representing 25% of total all-electric car registrations in Norway.

==== 2019 ====
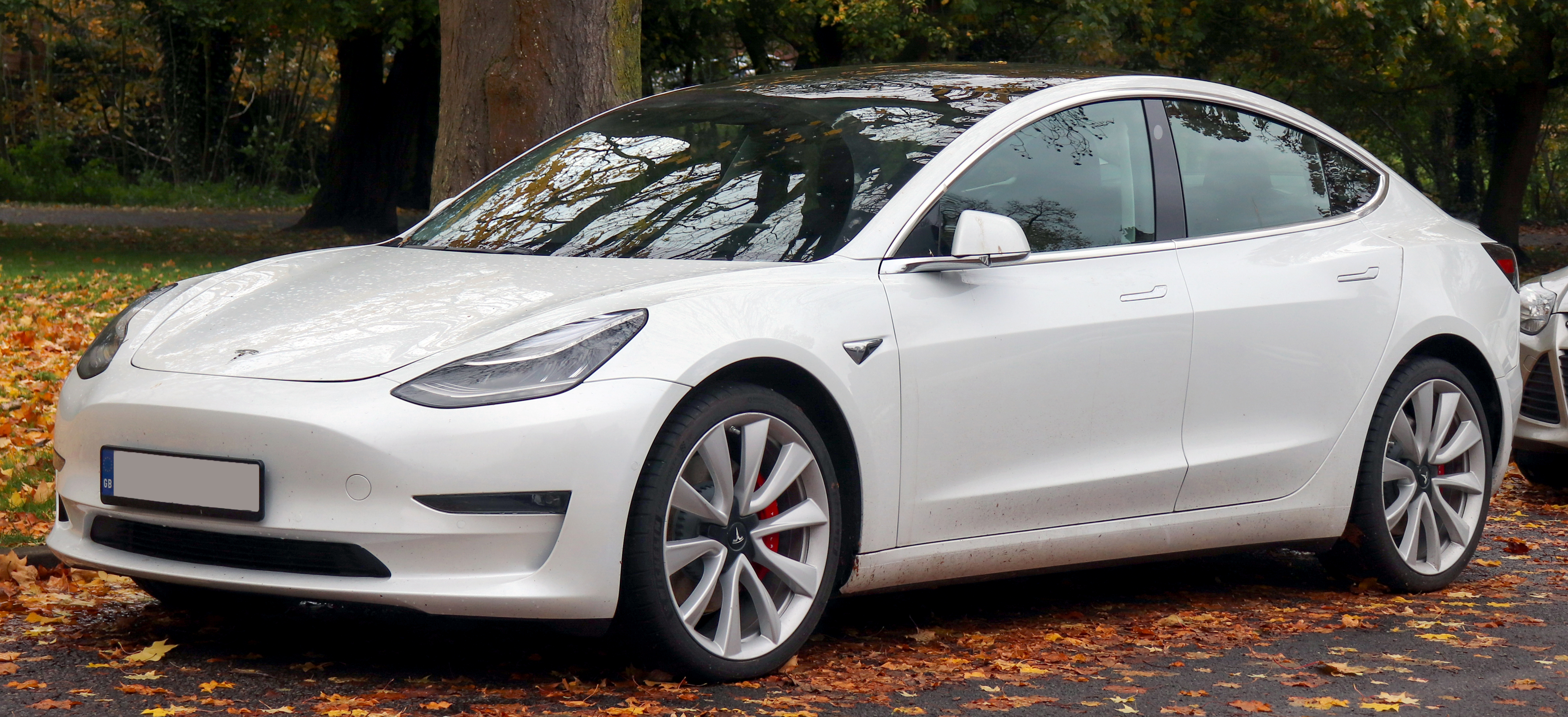
The Tesla Model 3 was Norway's best selling passenger car model in 2019. In March 2019 set the all-time record for monthly sales of a single model the country.

In January 2019, the 50,000th Nissan Leaf was registered. In March 2019, the Model 3, with over 5,300 cars delivered, established the all-time record for monthly sales of a single passenger car model in Norway.

A total of 88,443 light-duty plug-in electric vehicles were registered in Norway in 2019, consisting of 60,316 new electric cars, 6,802 used imported all-electric cars, 19,295 new plug-in hybrid cars, 1,928 new all-electric vans, and 102 used imported all-electric vans. Additionally, 29 new zero emissions hydrogen cars were registered. The all-electric segment market share was 42.4% and the plug-in hybrid car segment was 13.6%, for a combined market share of 55.9% of new passenger cars registered in 2019, meaning that just over one out of two new passenger car registered in 2019 was a plug-in electric car.

The Tesla Model 3 was the best selling passenger car model in 2019 with 15,683 units registered, an annual sales volume that became the country's third largest ever. The other top selling plug-in cars were the Volkswagen e-Golf (9,195), Nissan Leaf (6,127), Audi e-tron (5,377) and the Mitsubishi Outlander P-HEV(5,048), all models, also listed in the same order as the best selling passenger car models in the overall market. Out of the top 10 best selling cars in Norway in 2019, eight were plug-in cars.

As of 31 December 2019, the Norwegian stock of light-duty plug-in electric vehicles totalled 375,866 units on the road use consisting of 260,688 all-electric passenger cars and vans, and 115,178 plug-in hybrids.

==== 2020 ====
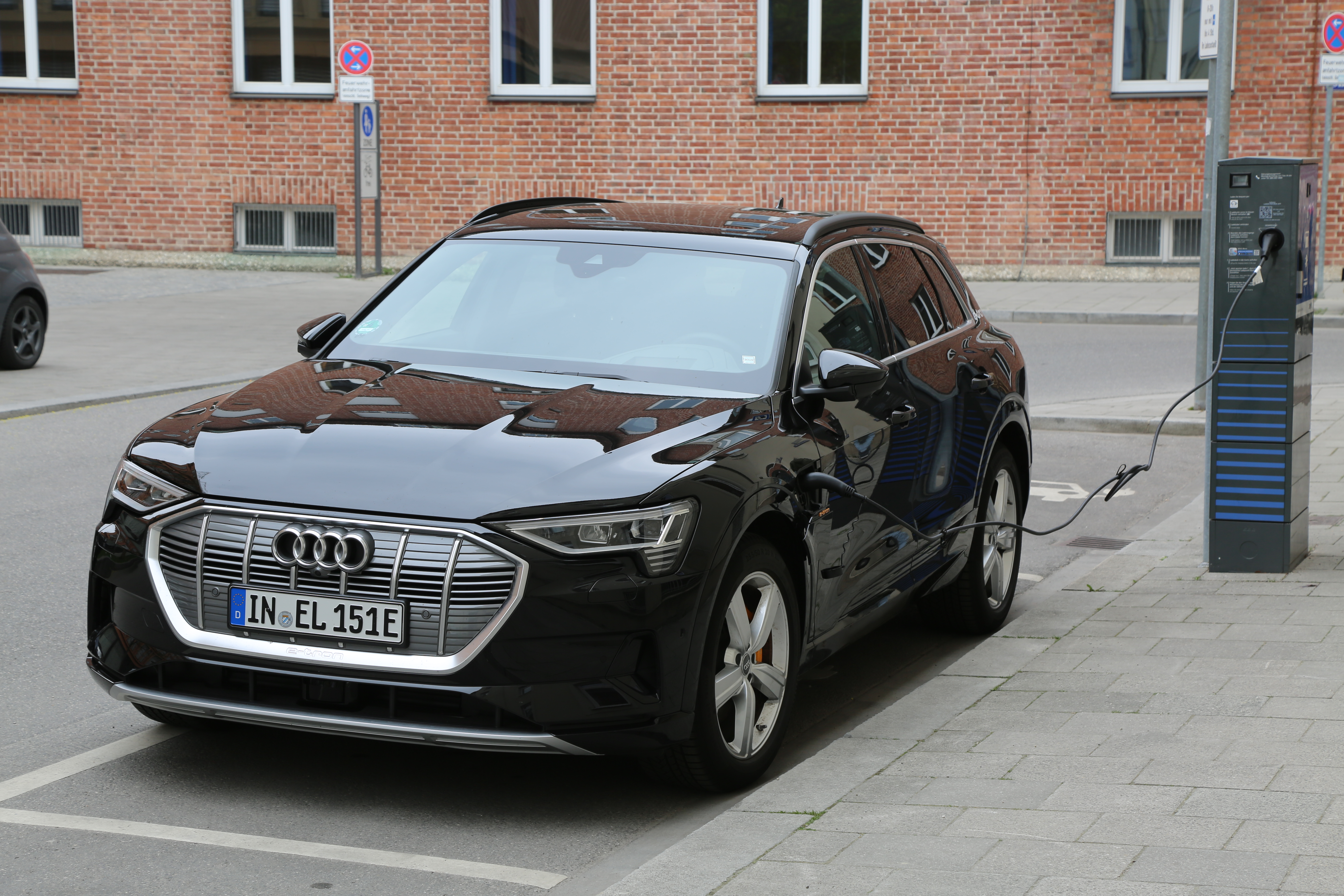
The Audi e-tron was Norway's top selling plug-in car and also the best selling passenger car in 2020.

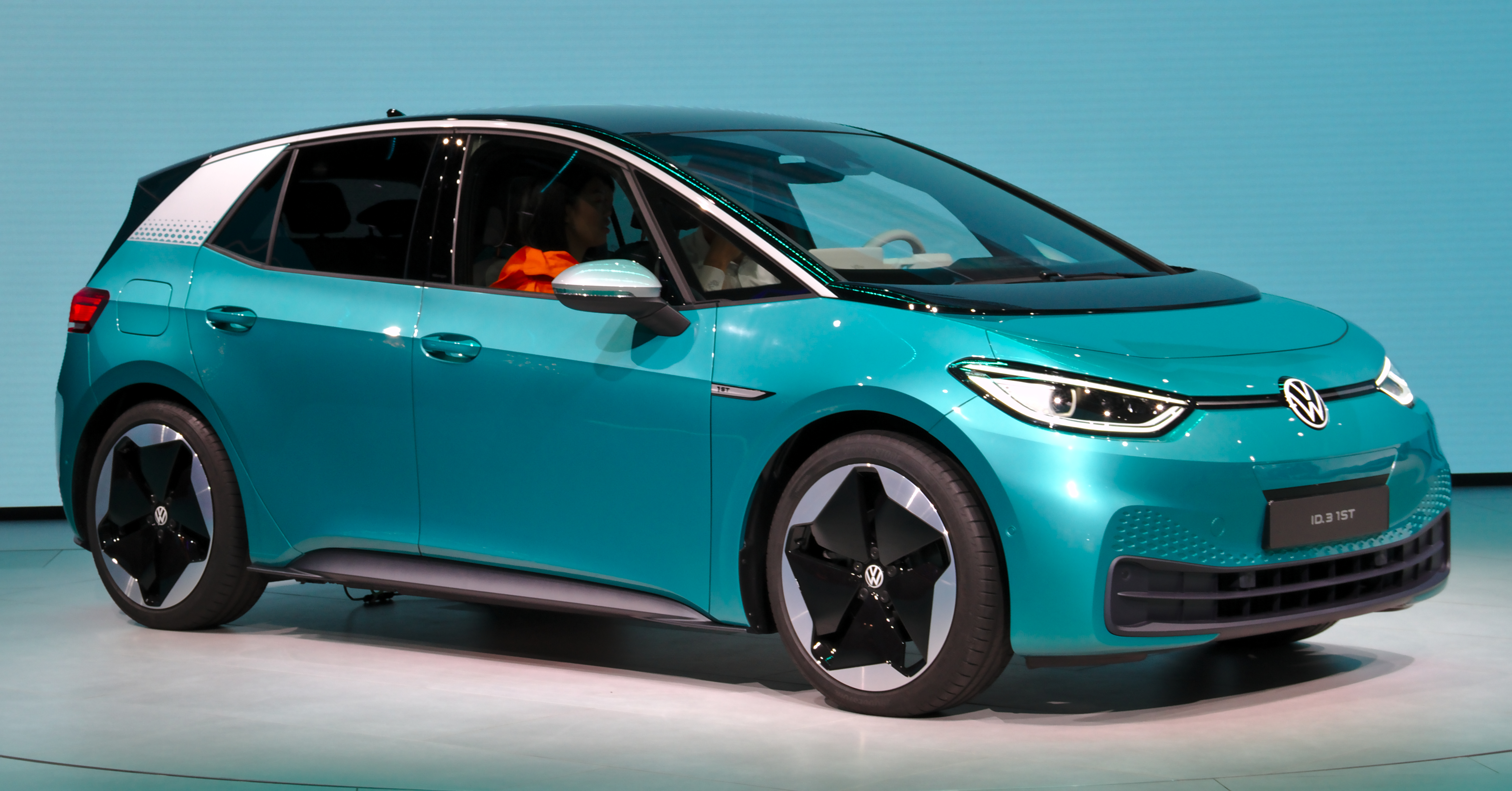
The all-electric Volkswagen ID.3 listed among Norway's top 5 best selling passenger cars in 2020.

Despite the global strong decline in car sales brought by the COVID-19 pandemic, new plug-in electric car sales in Norway between January and April 2020 remained about the same as in the same period in 2019. Even with the pandemic, the Norwegian plug-in car segment achieved a new record market share of 75.16% of new passenger car sales in March 2020, of which, 55.9% were all-electric cars.

In April 2020, the Norwegian stock of fully electric cars in use achieved the milestone of 10% of all cars in circulation in Norway. The 300,000th all-electric light-duty vehicle was registered in early June 2020. The world's highest-ever monthly market share for sales of plug-in electric passenger cars was achieved by Norway in December 2020, with a take rate of 87.1% of new registrations.

A total of 113,588 light-duty plug-in electric vehicles were registered in Norway in 2020, consisting of 76,789 new electric cars, 5,425 used imported all-electric cars, 28,905 new plug-in hybrid cars, 2,442 new all-electric vans, and 27 used imported all-electric vans. Additionally, 15 new zero emissions hydrogen cars were registered. The all-electric segment market share was 54.3% and the plug-in hybrid car segment was 20.4%, for a combined record market share of 74.7% of new passenger cars registered in the country in 2020. This volume of annual sales, allowed Norway to become the first country in the world where sales of fully electric cars outsold the combined volume of models containing internal combustion engines.

The Audi e-tron, with 9,227 units registered, listed as both the top selling plug-in car and Norway's top selling passenger car. The Tesla Model 3 ranked second with 7,770 units, followed by the VW ID.3 with 7,754, and the Nissan Leaf with 5,221. As of 31 December 2020, the Nissan Leaf continued to lead plug-in registrations with 65,528 units, of which, about 19,100 were registered as used imports.

Since 2010, a total of 489,669 light-duty electric vehicles have been registered through December 2020, of which, 346,822 are fully electric cars and vans, and 142,847 are plug-in hybrid cars. Since the introduction of EV incentives in the 1990s, total light-duty all-electric vehicle registrations rise to 359,656 units, as a result, cumulative registrations passed the 500,000 units mark in 2020. At the end of 2020, more than 15% of the passenger cars on the road were plug-in electric cars.

==== 2021 ====
In September 2021, the combined market share of the plug-in car segment achieved a new record of 91.5% of new passenger car registrations, 77.5% for all-electric cars and 13.9% for plug-in hybrids, becoming the world's highest-ever monthly plug-in car market share attained by any country.

==== 2024 ====
In 2024, the combined market share of the plug-in car segment achieved another new record of 91.6% of new passenger car registrations, 88.9% for all-electric cars and 2.7% for plug-in hybrids. Another 5.3% was for other hybrids.

=== Latest trends ===
==== Plug-in segment is replacing diesel cars ====
During the first quarter of 2016 petrol-driven cars kept almost the same market share as 2015, while the share of diesel-powered cars declined by 8.9%, almost corresponding to the gain of the plug-in hybrid segment. In September 2016 the Norwegian electric-drive segment had achieved a record 47.8% market share of new cars sales that month.

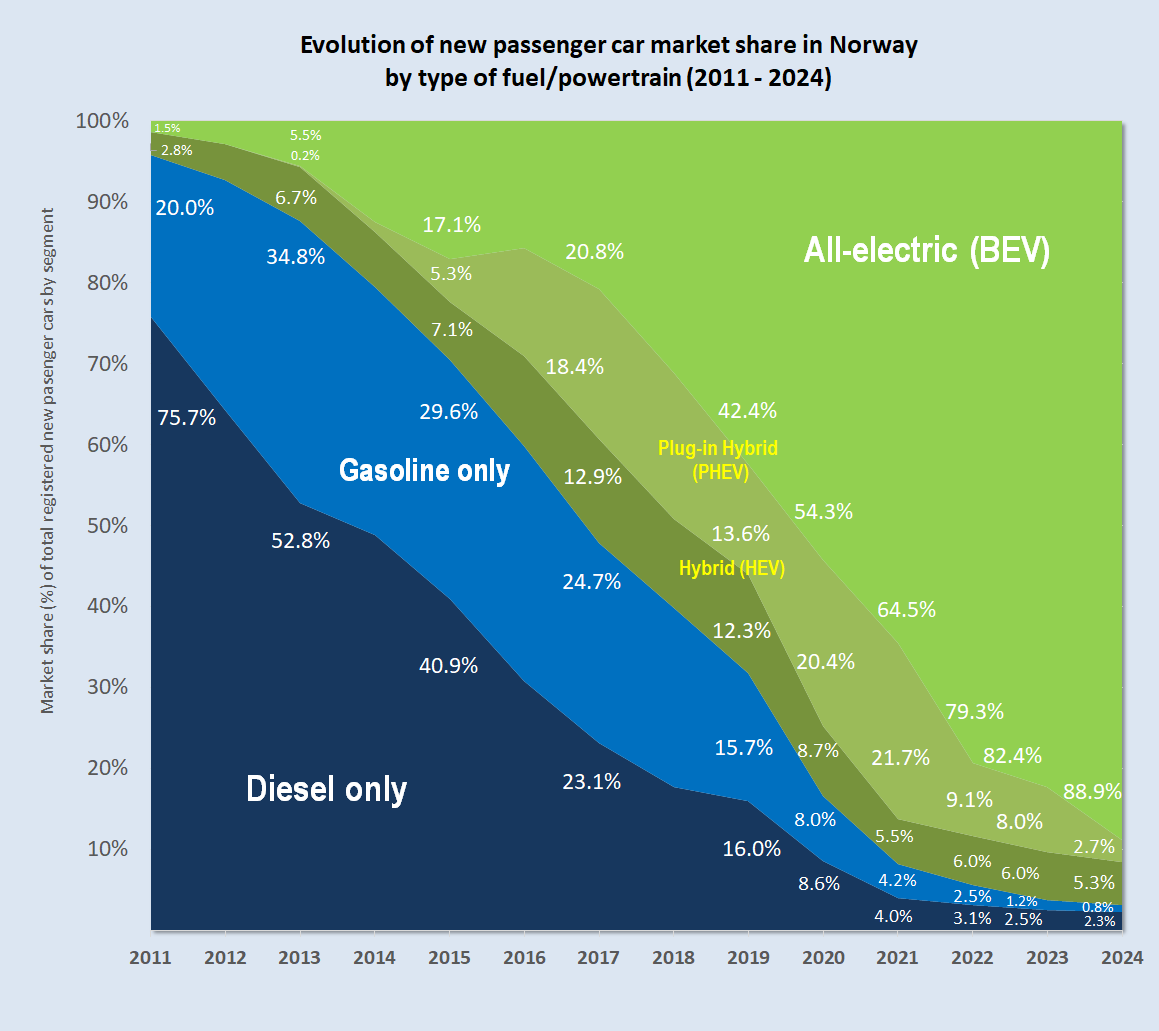
Evolution of new passenger car fleet market share in Norway by type of fuel or powertrain between 2011 and 2024. Source: Norwegian Road Federation (OFV).

In 2016 the more general category of hybrid electric cars, which in Norway includes plug-in hybrids, had a market share of 24.5% of new car sales, up from 12.4% in 2015. Accounting together the market shares of all-electric cars (15.7%), plug-in hybrids (13.4%), and conventional hybrids (11.1%), the Norwegian electric-drive segment achieved a record 40.2% market share of new cars sales in 2016. In contrast, the market share of new diesel-powered cars declined to 30.8% from 40.8% in 2015, and petrol-driven cars had a 29.0% market share, slightly down from 29.6% in 2015. These trends indicate that the diesel segment, and in a lesser degree, the petrol segment, are losing market share in favour of conventional hybrids and plug-in electric cars, particularly plug-in hybrids. Sales of plug-in cars were expected to overtake diesel-powered cars in Norway in 2017.

In January 2017 the electrified passenger car segment for the first time ever surpassed monthly combined sales of new cars with a conventional diesel or petrol engine. Sales of plug-in hybrids, all-electric cars and conventional hybrids achieved a market share of 51.4% of new car sales. The diesel car segment excluding hybrids had a market share of 23.9%. A new record was set in December 2017, when the plug-in car segment achieved a monthly market share of 50% of new registrations, 27.6% for all-electric cars and 22.4% for plug-in hybrids, both individually surpassing the market share of the diesel car segment excluding hybrids (18.8%). Cars powered only by petrol represented 22.7% of new car sales. The plug-in segment set a new record market share in 2017 with 39.2% of new passenger cars registered. The all-electric segment market share was 20.8% and the plug-in hybrid car segment was 18.4%, while the diesel-only segment was 23.1%, down from 30.8% in 2016, and petrol-only was 24.7%, down from 29.0% in 2016. Adding conventional hybrids, the electrified segment for the first time ever in any country surpassed the combined annual registrations of cars only powered by petrol or diesel, with a market share of 52.2% of new cars registrations in 2017.

The combined market share of the plug-in car segment in September 2018 rose to 60.2% of new car registrations, becoming the world's highest-ever monthly market share for the plug-in electric passenger segment in Norway, and in any country. The market share of all-electric cars was 45.3% and 14.9% for plug-in hybrids, while the market share for cars powered only by diesel fell to 12.4% and petrol-only to 16.1%. Accounting for conventional hybrids, the electrified segment achieved a record 71.5% market share in September 2018.

The combined market share of plug-in passenger cars reached 49.1% in 2018, and passed the 50% mark in 2019 with 55.9%, of which, electric cars represented 42.4% of new car registrations. In 2019 the market share of diesel-powered passenger cars fell to 16.0% and for petrol car dropped to 15.7%.

==== Plug-in hybrid segment growth to the expense of pure electrics ====
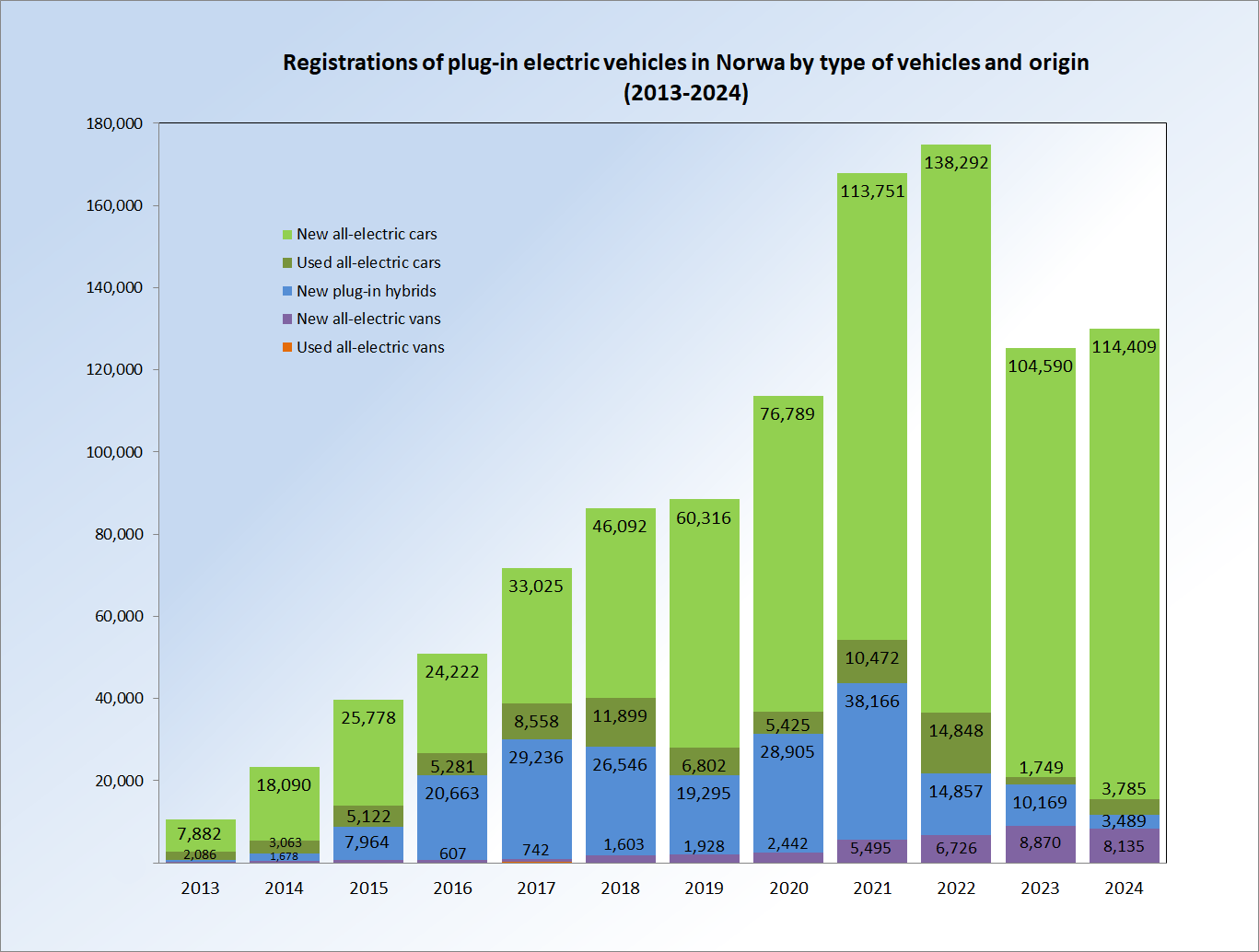
Annual registration of new and used imports by type of light-duty plug-in electric vehicle (2013–2024)

The plug-in hybrid segment outsold all-electric cars for the first time ever in the month of April 2016. Registrations of new passenger plug-in vehicles during the first half of 2016 totalled 11,744 all-electric cars and 10,338 plug-in hybrids, with the all-electric car segment reaching a market share of 15.1%, down from 18.4% in the same period in 2015, while the plug-in hybrid segment reached a record 13.3%, up from 4.5% in 2015. These sales results for the first half of 2016 revealed a new trend in the Norwegian plug-in electric market. After years of spectacular growth, the market share of all-electric cars suffered a decline over the previous year, while the plug-in hybrid segment experienced significant growth. In terms of sales volume during the first half of 2016, for the first time plug-in hybrid registrations (10,338) were very close to all-electrics (11,744). Accounting for registrations during the first three-quarters of 2016, plug-in hybrids grew nearly three-fold from the same period in 2016.

According to the Norwegian Electric Vehicle Association this new trend is the result of uncertainty created by the government about the future incentives for zero-emission vehicles. Also, buyers have more models to choose from, as the number of plug-in hybrid cars available in the market has increased significantly, as of August 2016, there were 19 plug-in hybrid models in the market and 15 all-electric cars. Accounting for cumulative registrations between January and July 2016, four plug-in hybrids were listed among the top 10 selling plug-in electric cars, with a plug-in hybrid ranking for the first time ever in first place. As the trend of stronger plug-in hybrid sales continued in July 2016, the split between battery electric cars and plug-in hybrids almost reached parity, with 12,855 electric cars (51.3%) registered in the first seven months of 2016 compared to 12,203 plug-in hybrids registered in the same period (48.7%).

In September 2016, the Norwegian Electric Vehicle Association proposed to the government to change the rules in the 2017 budget to limit the incentives for plug-in hybrids with insufficient all-electric range and luxury models featuring an electric powertrain with a small battery with the sole purpose of increasing power output. Nevertheless, after the introduction of several long-range electric cars, sales of plug-in hybrids began to decline in 2018, with 9.2% less units than 2017, and fell further in 2019, with a decline of 27.3% from 2018 registrations.

==== Customers in waiting lists ====
In May 2018, European Federation for Transport and Environment, based on research by the EU Electromobility Platform, reported that there is evidence from Norway and other European countries suggesting that EV adoption is being hampered locally by insufficient supply of electric cars to match the existing level of demand. In the particular case of Norway, despite being a small country, demand is outstripping supply, and as a result, the waiting time for customers wanting to buy an electric car is between 8 months and 2 years, while thousands have paid deposits to be on a waiting list for new models.

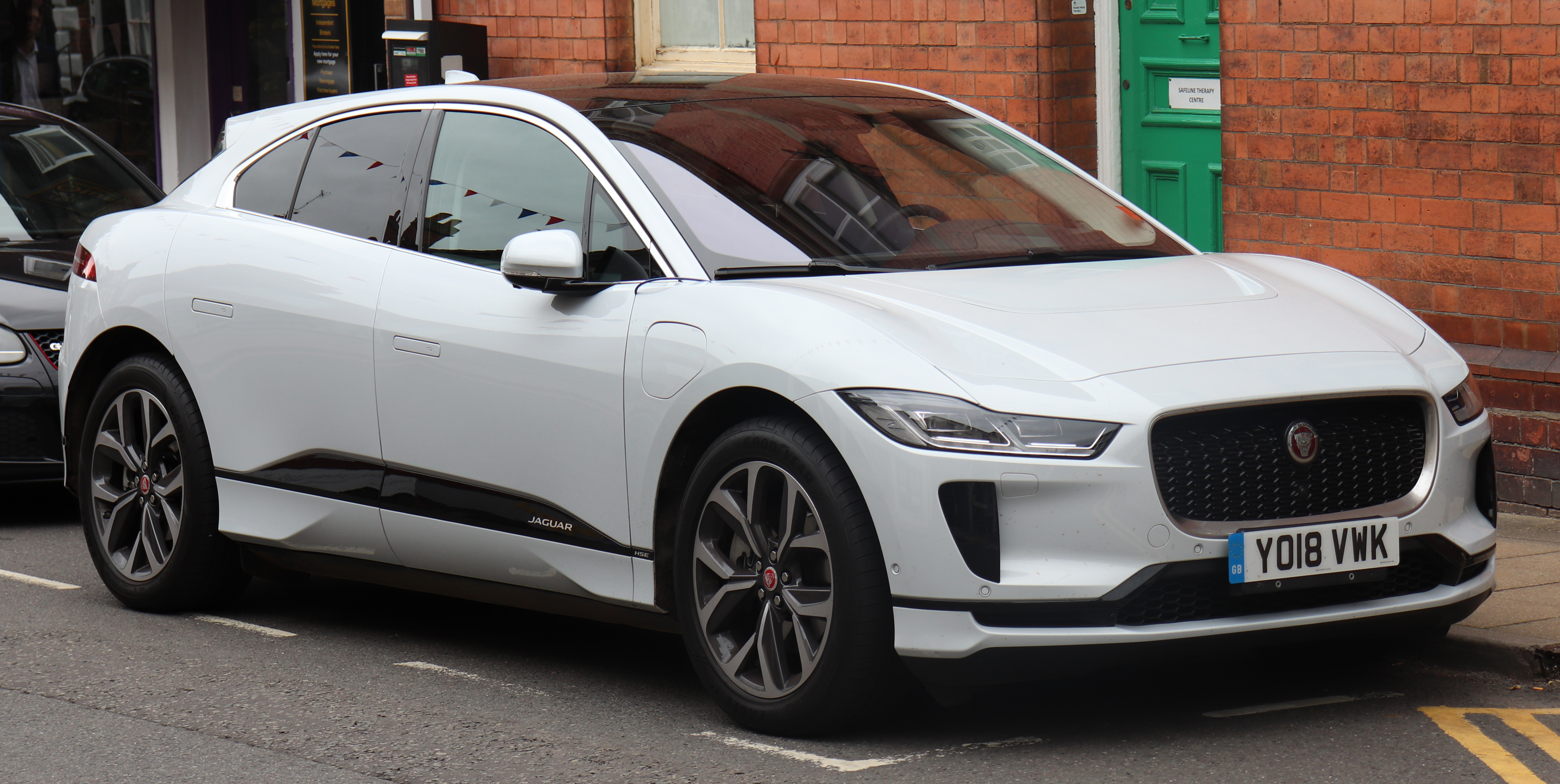
The Jaguar I-Pace was among the models already released with customers wait listed in Norway due to short supply.

In October 2018, the Norwegian Electric Vehicle Association (Norsk Elbilforening) reported that there is a supply shortage of some electric cars models already released, and also, there are many customers who already paid a deposit for reservation of a future model, for a combined total of about 30,000 electric car customers listed on different waiting lists.

As of October 2018, the waiting list for models already released include the Tesla Model 3 (10,000), Hyundai Kona Electric (6,000), second generation Nissan Leaf (3,000), and Jaguar I-Pace (3,000). The waiting list for models slated for release in the Norwegian market in the near future include: the Audi e-tron quattro (6,300), Kia e-Niro (5,900), Porsche Taycan (2,300), Mercedes-Benz EQC (2,200), DS Crossback E-Tense (1,350), and BMW iX3 (1,000). Total paid reservations amount to more than 40,000 pre-orders, as some customers signed in for more than one model. According to NRK estimates, the total amount paid by customers in these waiting lists is about 400 million krone (about US$48 million). By monetary value, the waiting list is led by the Audi e-tron quattro and the Tesla Model 3.

=== Registrations by model ===
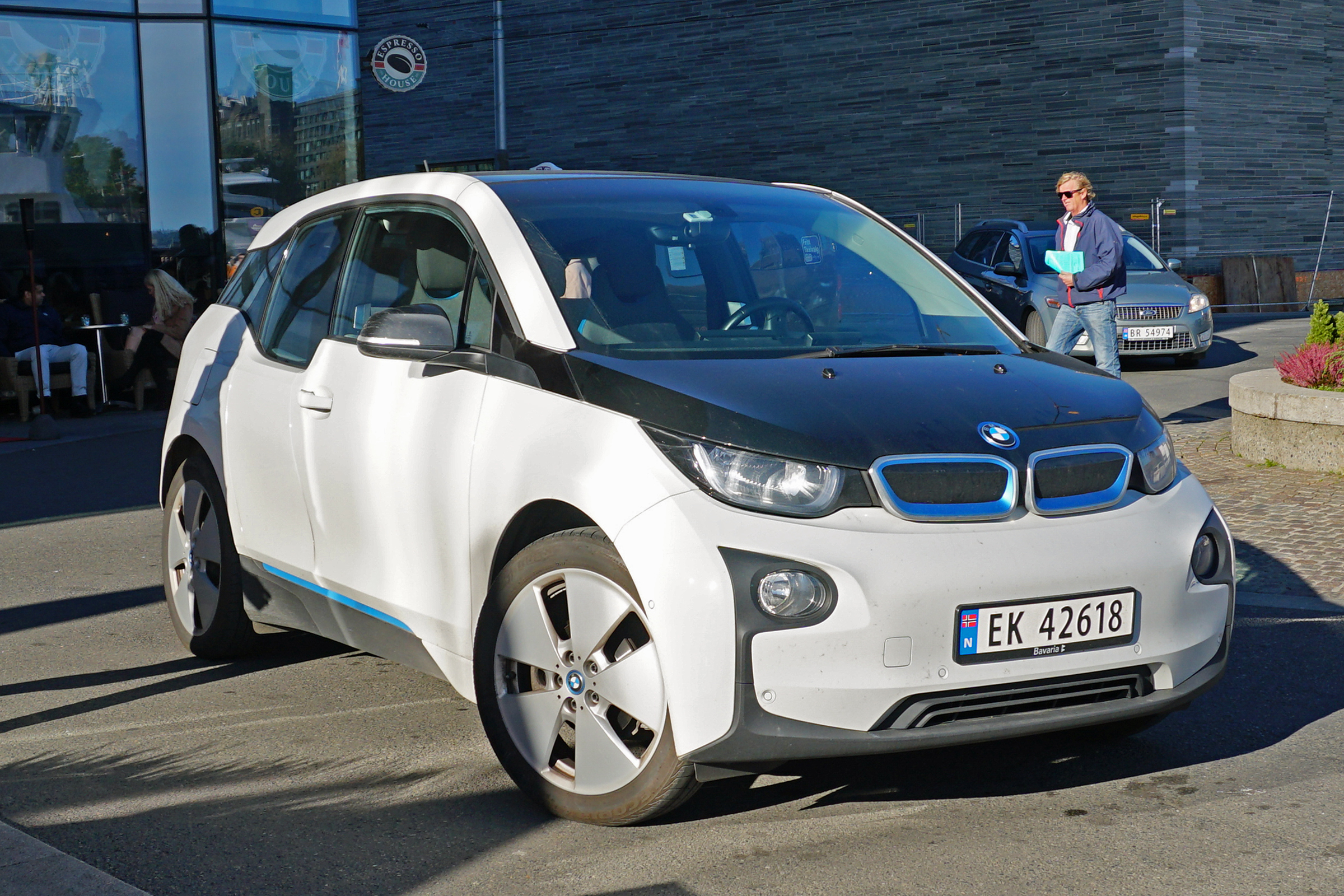
The BMW i3 was among Norway's best-selling electric cars in 2019.

As of 4 January 2025, the Nissan Leaf continues to be the all-time best selling plug-in-electric car in Norway, with 80,967 units registered since inception, including 21,848 used imports. Accounting only for new car sales, the Tesla Model Y ranks and the best selling model, with 65,564 units sold since inception.

Other popular all-electric models, including used imports, are the Tesla Model 3 with 48,469 units, the Volkswagen e-Golf with 48,306 units, the Volkswagen ID.4 with 34,507, the BMW i3 with 31,087, the Audi e-tron with 30,757, the Škoda Enyaq with 25,985, the Hyundai Kona with 25,904, and the Kia Soul EV with 24,532. Together, these top ten models represent 46.8% of the 890,533 fully electric cars and vans that had been registered in Norway since the 2000s. These figures include 80,939 used imports from neighboring countries, representing 9% of all first time registrations.

== Effects on oil consumption ==
Historical trend of annual sales of petroleum products for road motor vehicles in Norway, 2016–2026. Source: Statistisk sentralbyrå (Statistics Norway).

Despite having for many years the world's highest growth rates and highest penetration of EVs, Norway's crude oil consumption for motor vehicles increased from 2013 to 2016, particularly dutiable diesel fuel. One factor in the slow decline of oil consumption is Norway's relatively rapid population growth. Another factor is the significant number of petrol- and diesel-driven vehicles still on the roads, with only 5% being plug-in electric passenger cars by the end of 2016.

However, according to Forbes, government figures for the sales of petroleum products in 2017, show that for the first time since 2014 Norway's consumption of petrol and diesel declined across the board in 2017. Motor petrol sales declined by 2.9%, dutiable diesel fell by 2.7%, and duty-free diesel (used by agricultural equipment) declined by 2.6%. This decline follows oil sales that were flat in 2014, and then grew by 1% in 2015 and 3.2% in 2016. Between 2016 and 2025, sales of petrol and auto diesel declined by 26.7%, with a larger drop of 28.1% in the petrol segment, which includes conventional hybrids and plug-in hybrids.

== Effects on average fleet CO_{2} emissions ==
A 2009 European Union regulation set a mandatory average CO_{2} emissions target for new cars of 130 g/km, that were phased in between 2012 and 2015. A target of 95 g/km will apply from 2021. This regulation applies to the average fleet emissions of new passenger cars sold in the European Union and EEA member states. A car manufacturer who fails to comply has to pay an "excess emissions premium" for each car registered according with amount of g/km of exceedance. The average emissions level of a new car sold in 2017 was significantly below the 2015 target, at 118.5 grams of CO_{2} per km. Norway achieved in 2016 the European target set for 2021, with average CO_{2} emissions for all new passenger cars registered in 2016 of 93 g/km, down 7 g/km from 2015.

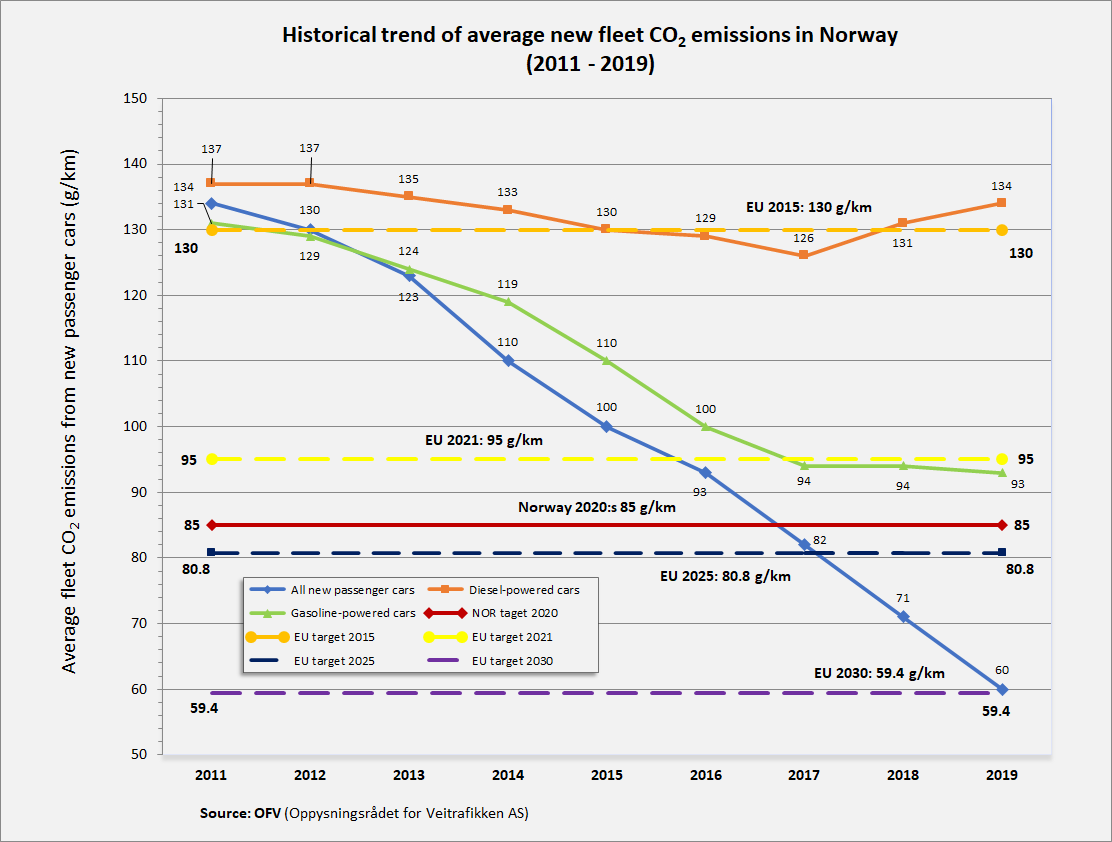
Historical trend of annual average new fleet CO_{2} emissions in Norway (2011–2019). Source: Norwegian Road Federation (OFV)

In order to reduce the country's greenhouse gas emissions, the Norwegian government pledged in 2012, among other measures, a target for the average fleet CO_{2} emission rate of new passenger cars of 85 g/km by 2020, 10 g/km lower than the European Commission's targets for 2021.

As a result of its fast growing EV market penetration, average fleet CO_{2} emissions have been falling in Norway from month to month. Average CO_{2} emissions for all new passenger cars registered in 2017 was 82 g/km, down from 93 g/km in 2016, and below the government's target of 85 grams set for 2020. With all-electric cars accounting for just over 5% of the total stock of passenger cars registered at the end of 2017, Norway achieved its transportation emissions target three years before the pledged deadline.

In September 2018, the average CO_{2} emissions from all first-time registered new passenger cars achieved a new record low of 55 g/km, down from 71 g/km in September 2017. An explanation of the new records, among other things, is found in the record sales of all-electric cars that took place in September 2018, when for the first time ever, zero emissions cars stood for almost half of passenger car sales for a month (45.3%). Such a large number of electric cars caused a record low average fleet CO_{2} emissions. Annual average new passenger car fleet CO_{2} emissions reached an all-time low in 2019 with 60 g/km, 11 g/km lower than in 2018. Nevertheless, the average for petrol-driven cars declined only 1 g/km from 2018 to 93 g/km, while diesel-powered cars increase their average CO_{2} emissions from 131 g/km in 2018 to 134 g/km in 2019. The net gain in reduction of average fleet CO_{2} emissions is due to the large market share of 42.4% of new car sales achieved by the all-electric segment in 2019 (including 29 fuel cell hydrogen vehicles).

== Controversies ==
=== Piggyback on French subsidies ===
Some car dealers in Norway have been importing new and used plug-in electric cars, in particular from Sweden, Denmark, Belgium, Netherlands, Germany, France, Italy and Spain. In the case of the Nissan Leaf, these dealers buy mostly new cars at a lower price than Norway's retail price thanks to the moderate demand for Leaf in other countries, where better price deals are offered. Then, the cars are sold in the Norwegian market up to 30,000 kr (~ US$5,000) cheaper than from Norway's dealerships. Official Norwegian dealers have raised questions about the kind of guarantee offered for the imports. Out of 1,412 all-electric cars registered in the country during the first quarter of 2013, 269 were used imports, representing 19% of all registrations during this quarter.

In September 2013, several French news outlets reported that according to the Norwegian newspaper Dagens Næringsliv, some car dealers in Norway have been buying electric cars in France and earning the €7,000 (~ US$9,465) government subsidy. These cars are then imported to Norway and after discounting the freight costs, they are sold at a discount. Dagens Næringsliv cited the case of one dealer near Oslo with 70% of its electric car sales corresponding to vehicles imported from France, and with at least 40 Leafs imported, totalling €280,000 ( ~ US$378,600) in benefits at a cost of the French taxpayers. These dealers are taking advantage of a loophole in the French law, which only requires to have an address in the country when buying a new car.

=== Loophole to EU regulations ===
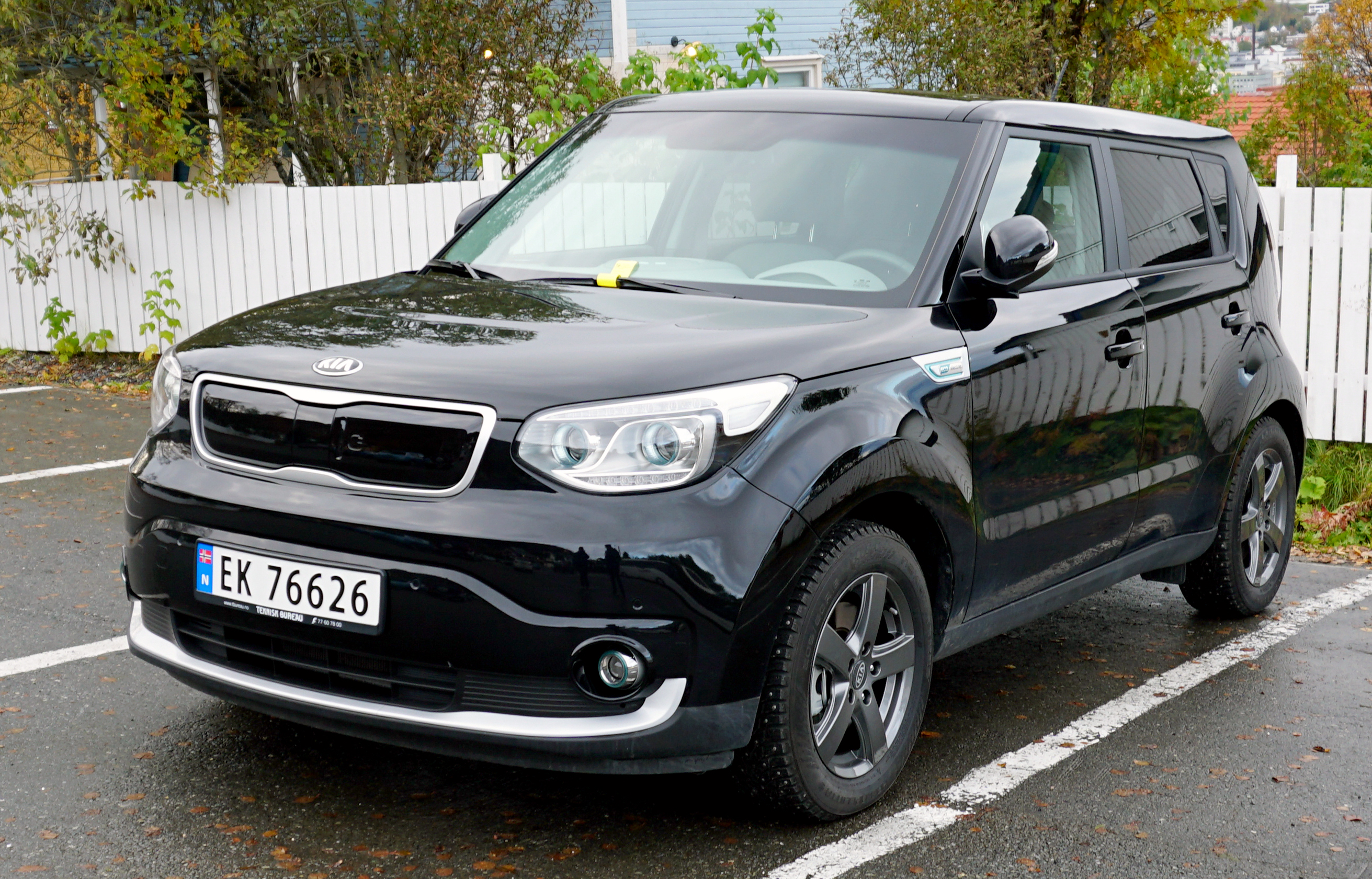
During 2015 a total of 2,044 used Kia Soul EVs were imported in Norway, mainly from Germany.

According to Der Spiegel, by the early fourth quarter of 2015 the Kia Soul EV ranked as the top-selling plug-in electric car in Germany during 2015 with 2,459 units sold, with almost 1,000 registered in October, nevertheless, there were actually only a few of them on German roads. At the time, about 1,400 Soul EVs had been shipped to Norway and sold as used cars, where availability of new Soul EVs is limited. According to the magazine, Kia Motors is registering the electric cars in Germany and then shipping them to Norway, which does not belong to the European Union, as a strategy to reduce the average CO_{2} fleet emissions of the entire Hyundai-Kia Group. This strategy allows the carmaker to comply with European Union regulations that mandate 130 grams of CO_{2} emission per km in 2015, and so they avoid to pay a fine of €70 million per year for each gram above the established average limit. According to German authorities this strategy is legal. A total of 2,044 Kia Soul EVs were imported to Norway as used cars during 2015.

== See also ==
- Energy in Norway
- Government incentives for plug-in electric vehicles
- List of modern production plug-in electric vehicles
- Renewable energy in Norway
