= Christian Collovà =

Italian rally driver

- Nationality: (Italy) Italian
- Born: 21 January 1972 (age 54) Koblenz, Germany

FIA Alternative Energies Cup career
- Debut season: 2005
- Former teams: Citroën

Championship titles
- 2007, 2008, 2010: FIA Alternative Energies Cup

Christian Collovà is an Italian rally co-driver and Italian champion in the FIA Alternative Energies Cup. He is currently an Intellectual Property lawyer.

== Early life and education ==
Collovà was born in Koblenz, Germany and grew up in Paris, France.

He graduated from the University of Rome. Collovà is currently a copyright and entertainment lawyer.

== Career ==
Along with rally driver Vincenzo Di Bella, Collovà was FIA Alternative Energies Cup runner-up in 2007, 2008 and 2010. In 2007 and 2008, he came in behind Giuliano Mazzoni as the World Championship runner-up.

In 2010, as the co-driver of the Citroën C5 along with driver Vincenzo Di Bella, Collovà won the Italian Championship. He was also the World Championship runner-up behind French rally driver Raymond Durand (driving a Toyota Prius) in the FIA Alternative Energies Cup, Additionally, he has won the Monza and Franciacorta races, and came in second place at the Green Prix EcoTarga Florio and Ecorally San Marino - Vaticano races.

In addition to his sporting activity, he works as a lawyer, specializing in intellectual property, copyright in the film industry and legal aspects of filmmaking. Since 2015, Collovà serves on the Board of Directors of the Italian Chapter of Association Littéraire et Artistique Internationale (ALAI Italia), Since 2018, he serves on the Board of Directors of the Campania Region Film Commission Foundation.

== Personal life ==
Collovà speaks Italian, French, and English.

== See also ==
- FIA Alternative Energies Cup
- Vincenzo Di Bella
- Massimo Liverani
