= Tesla Rally =

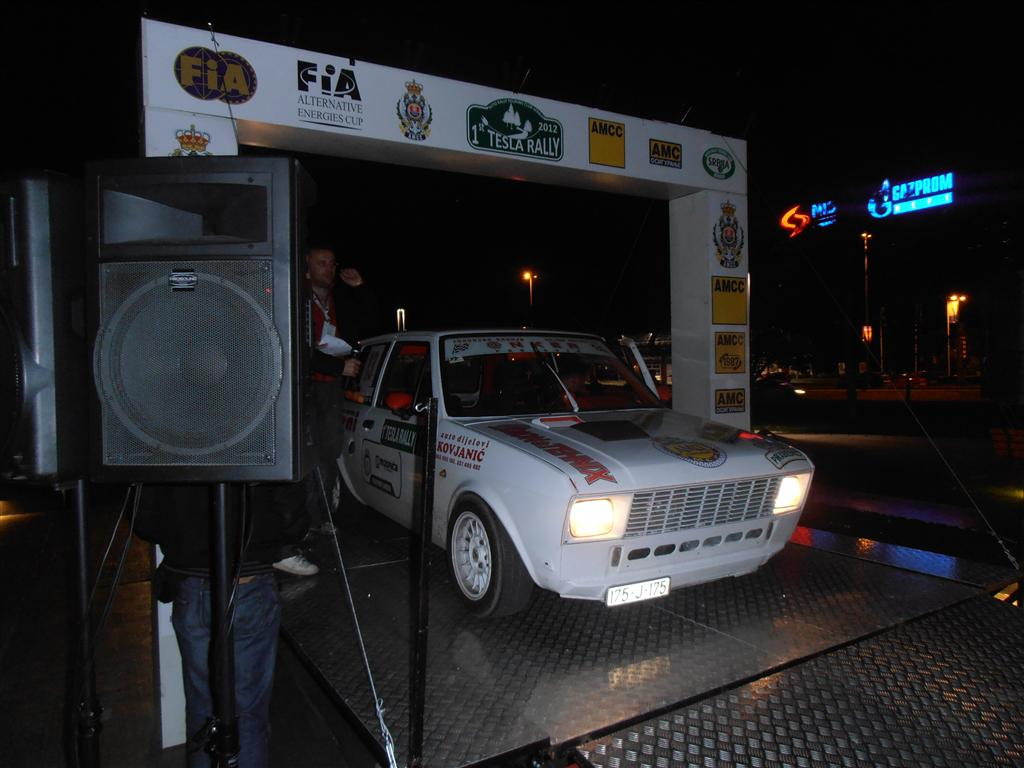
Zastava Yugo 65 at Tesla Rally. Belgrade, 27 October 2012.

The Tesla Rally is a FIA Alternative Energies Cup event named after the scientist Nikola Tesla. Reserved to vehicles with alternative energy propulsion, it starts and finishes in Belgrade.

== Winners ==
Year	Winners	2nd place	3rd place
2012	(Italy) Massimo Liverani (Italy) Fulvio Ciervo (Fiat 500 Abarth)	(Italy) Guido Guerrini (Italy) Emanuele Calchetti (Alfa Romeo MiTo)	(Monaco) Fulvio Maria Ballabio (Italy) Massimiliano Sorghi (Alfa Romeo GTV)
2013	(Italy) Massimo Liverani (Italy) Fulvio Ciervo (Fiat 500 Abarth)	(Italy) Guido Guerrini (Italy) Francesca Olivoni (Alfa Romeo MiTo)	(Slovenia) Gregor Zdvoc (Serbia) Nenad Stojanović (Toyota Prius)
2014	(Slovenia) Gregor Zdvoc (Slovenia) Ana Ivanšek (Toyota Prius)	(Italy) Massimo Liverani (Italy) Fulvio Ciervo (Fiat 500 Abarth)	(Italy) Guido Guerrini (Italy) Isabelle Barciulli (Alfa Romeo MiTo)
