= 2012 FIA Alternative Energies Cup =

Seasons
- ← 2011 2013 →

The 2012 FIA Alternative Energies Cup was a season of the FIA Alternative Energies Cup, a world championship for vehicles with alternative energy propulsion organized by the Fédération Internationale de l'Automobile. The season had eight rallies, beginning with Rally Montecarlo on 22 March.

For the final classifications, 50% rounded up of the best results plus one was taken into account.

== Calendar and winners ==
Date	Race	Winners cat. VII/VIII		Winners cat. III	
March 22, 2012	(Monaco) Rallye Montecarlo	(France) Sylvain Blondeau (France) Jean-Luc Hasler	(Romania) Dacia Logan	(France) James Morlaix (France) Valérie Palmarole	(United States) Tesla Roadster
June 1, 2012	(Spain) IV Eco Rallye Vasco Navarro, Vitoria-Gasteiz	(Spain) Maykel del Cid (Spain) Carlos García	(Japan) Toyota Prius	(Spain) Antonio Zanini (Spain) Eduardo Anzotegui	(Japan) Mitsubishi i-MiEV
June 9, 2012	(Italy) 1° Mendola-Mendel Ecorally	(Italy) Alberto Donghi (Italy) Renato Delbara	(France) Peugeot 3008	(Italy) Fuzzy Kofler (Italy) Christian Frei	(Norway) Think City
June 29, 2012	(Italy) 1° Sestriere Ecorally	(Italy) Massimo Liverani (Italy) Alessandro Talmelli	(Italy) Fiat 500 Abarth	(Italy) Fuzzy Kofler (Italy) Franco Gaioni	(Norway) Think City
September 28, 2012	(Canada) Rallye Énergie Alternative, Montreal	(Canada) Vin Pham (Canada) Alan Ockwell	(Japan) Toyota Prius	(Canada) Réjean Losier (Canada) Brian Maxwell	(Japan) Mitsubishi i-MiEV
October 5, 2012	(Greece) Hi-Tech Ecomobility Rally, Athens	(Italy) Guido Guerrini (Italy) Emanuele Calchetti	(Italy) Alfa Romeo Mito	(Greece) Georgios Liveris (Greece) Dionissios Liveris	(Japan) Mitsubishi i-MiEV
October 12, 2012 (cat. VII/VIII); November 3, 2012 (cat. III)	7° Ecorally San Marino – Vaticano	(Italy) Massimo Liverani (Italy) Valeria Strada	(Italy) Fiat 500 Abarth	(Italy) Valerio Rimondi (Italy) Liana Fava	(Japan) Mitsubishi i-MiEV
October 26, 2012	(Serbia) 1st Tesla Rally, Belgrade	(Italy) Massimo Liverani (Italy) Fulvio Ciervo	(Italy) Fiat 500 Abarth	(Spain) Jesús Echave (Spain) Juanan Delgado	(Japan) Nissan Leaf

== Driver Standings cat. VII & VIII ==
Points	Driver
74	(Italy) Massimo Liverani
64	(Italy) Guido Guerrini
20	(Spain) Maykel del Cid, (Canada) Vin Pham
19	(Italy) Roberto Viganò
17	(Italy) Vincenzo Di Bella
16	(San Marino) Stefano Pezzi, (Spain) Iker Torrontegui
14	(Italy) Isabelle Barciulli
12	(Greece) Ioannis Kepetzis, (Italy) Nicola Ventura, (Spain) Txema Foronda, (Canada) Sébastien Kroetsch, (Monaco) Fulvio Maria Ballabio
10	(Bulgaria) Mariya Mihailova, (Canada) Bertrand Martin, (France) Sylvain Blondeau, (Greece) Nikolaos Karapanagiotis, (Italy) Alberto Donghi, (Spain) Roberto Uriarte
8	(Serbia) Branko Nadj, (France) Bernard Darniche, (Italy) Marcello Saporetti, (Spain) Javier del Cid, (Canada) Frédéric Charpentier
6	(Greece) Georgios Chyssanthakopoulos, (San Marino) Alen Burgagni, (France) Stéphane Deschamps
5	(France) Jean-Claude Andruet
4	(France) Jean-Paul Marcaillou, (Canada) Dominic Garceau, (Serbia) Nenad Stojanović, (Greece) Dimitrios Malathritis
3	(France) Bryan Bouffier, (Italy) Roberto Valentini
2	(Bosnia and Herzegovina) Dragan Strazivuk, (Spain) Jon Martínez, (Italy) Fabio Gemelli, (Italy) Gerard Albertengo, (Greece) Constantinos Lambouras, (Canada) Jonathan Routhier, (France) Raymond Durand
1	(France) Charlotte Berton, (Italy) Eugenio Buttiero

== Co-Driver Standings cat. VII & VIII ==
Points	Co-Driver
62	(Italy) Emanuele Calchetti
36	(Italy) Fulvio Ciervo
30	(Italy) Valeria Strada
20	(Spain) Carlos García, (Canada) Alan Ockwell
19	(Italy) Andrea Fovana
18	(Italy) Alessandro Talmelli
17	(Italy) Alberto Conte
16	(San Marino) Valentino Muccini, (Spain) Ianire Fernández
14	(Italy) Francesca Olivoni
12	(Canada) Eric Bernier-Meunier, (Greece) Michalis Dafnomilis, (Italy) Leonardo Burchini, (Spain) Pilar Rodas, (Italy) Monica Porta, (Italy) Massimiliano Sorghi
10	(Bulgaria) Zvezdelina Belnikolova, (France) Jean-Luc Hasler, (Italy) Renato Delbara, (Spain) Asier Lasa, (Greece) Fotios Vrotsis, (Canada) Sébastien Robert
8	(Serbia) Stevo Rauš, (Canada) Bertrand Gaudet, (France) Joseph Lambert, (Italy) Vincenzo Blandino, (Spain) Iñaki Pradells
6	(San Marino) Antonio Burgagni, (Canada) Jonathan Routhier, (Greece) Dimitris Chyssanthakopoulos
5	(France) Patrick Lienne
4	(Canada) Robert Thouin, (Greece) Efichia Zacharopoulou, (France) Jean Claude Lamorlette, (Serbia) Stefan Todorović
3	(France) Eric Mallen, (Italy) Federica Valentini
2	(Italy) Monica Eusebio, (Bosnia and Herzegovina) Mladen Vasilić, (Italy) Daniele Pizzo, (Spain) Maite Seara, (Greece) Valter Filippakis, (Canada) Sylvain Légaré, (France) Christian Fine
1	(France) Olivier Sussot, (Italy) Christian Buttiero

== Manufacturer Standings cat. VII & VIII ==
Points	Manufacturer
89	(Italy) Fiat
76	(Italy) Alfa Romeo
67	(Japan) Toyota
40	(Japan) Lexus
39	(France) Peugeot
31	(Japan) Honda
26	(United States) Ford
16	(Germany) Opel
14	(Germany) Mercedes
13	(United States) Chevrolet, (France) Citroën
10	(Romania) Dacia
8	(United States) General Motors, (Germany) BMW, (Germany) Audi
6	(Germany) Porsche, (France) Renault
4	(Serbia) Zastava, (China) Byd, (Germany) Volkswagen
2	(Czech Republic) Škoda, (Japan) Subaru
