= Desara Muriqi =

Albanian rally driver (born 1985)

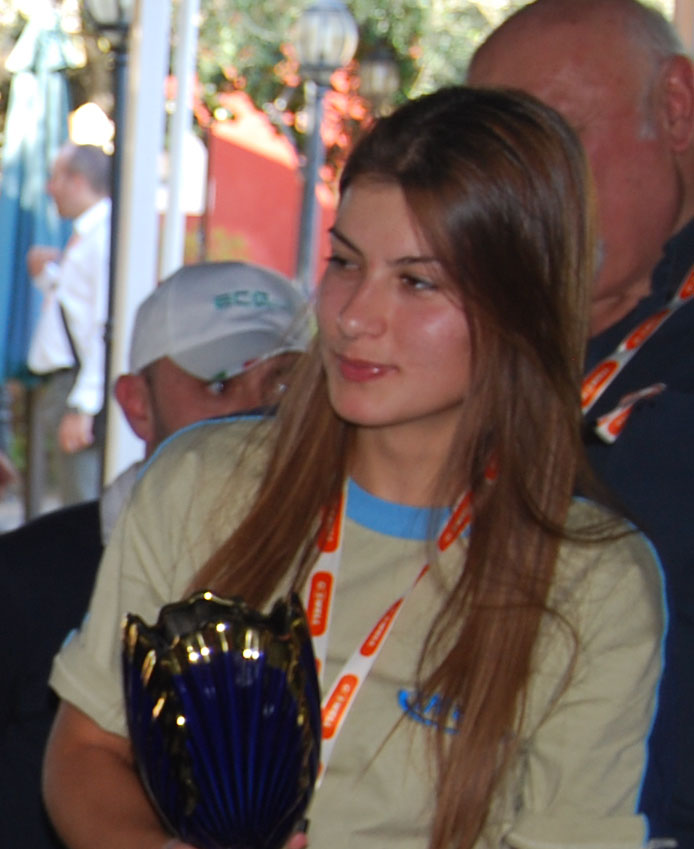
- Desara Muriqi after the Ecorally San Marino - Città del Vaticano. Rome, 16 October 2011.
- Nationality: (Albania) Albanian
- Born: 27 May 1985 (age 41) Shkodër, Albania

FIA Alternative Energies Cup career
- Current team: Gonow

Desara Muriqi (27 May 1985) is an Albanian rally driver born in Shkodër. She moved to Sansepolcro, Italy in 2002, and in 2011 she took a degree in Foreign languages and literatures at the University of Siena.

In the 2011 FIA Alternative Energies Cup season, with the sixth place obtained in the Ecorally San Marino - Città del Vaticano (together with the Ukrainian co-driver Yulia Lutsyk on Gonow GA200), Muriqi reached the best result for a female team in the history of the FIA Alternative Energies Cup. She was also the first Albanian driver to gain points in an official FIA world championship.

== See also ==
- FIA Alternative Energies Cup
- Massimo Liverani
- Guido Guerrini (driver)
