= Ecorally San Marino – Città del Vaticano =

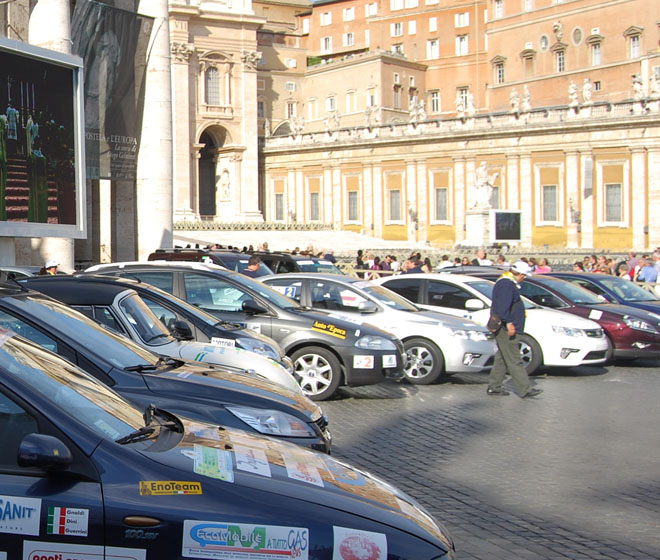
Cars in Saint Peter's Square, Vatican City, after the 5th Ecorally, October 24, 2010.

The Ecorally San Marino – Città del Vaticano (Italian pronunciation: [ekoˈrɛlli sam maˈriːno tʃitˈta ddel vatiˈkaːno]) is a FIA Alternative Energies Cup event organized since 2006 by the S.M.R.O. – San Marino Racing Organization. Reserved to vehicles with alternative energy propulsion, it starts from the Republic of San Marino and goes through Central Italy to Vatican City.

== Winners ==
Year	Combined classification	Regularity	Consumption	Press Category
2006	–	(Italy) Cesare Romani (Italy) Giuseppe Grossi	(Italy) Giuliano Mazzoni (Italy) Marcello Aranci	–
2007	–	(Italy) Vincenzo Di Bella (Italy) Alessandro Vatri	(Italy) Vincenzo Di Bella (Italy) Alessandro Vatri	–
2008	(Italy) Giuliano Mazzoni (Italy) Massimo Liverani	(Italy) Giuliano Mazzoni (Italy) Massimo Liverani	(Italy) Vincenzo Di Bella (Italy) Alessandro Vatri	–
2009	(France) Raymond Durand (France) Jean-Pierre Bertrand	(Italy) Guido Guerrini (Italy) Andrea Gnaldi Coleschi	(France) Raymond Durand (France) Jean-Pierre Bertrand	(Italy) Roberto Chiodi (Italy) Maria Rita Degli Esposti
2010	(Italy) Massimo Liverani (Italy) Valeria Strada	(San Marino) Stefano Pezzi (San Marino) Valentino Muccini	(Spain) Jesús Echave (Spain) Juanan Delgado	(Italy) Roberto Chiodi (Italy) Maria Rita Degli Esposti
2011	–	(Italy) Roberto Viganò (Italy) Andrea Fovana	–	(Italy) Roberto Chiodi (Italy) Silvana Chiodi
2012	–	(Italy) Massimo Liverani (Italy) Valeria Strada	–	(Italy) Nicola Ventura (Italy) Monica Porta
2013	–	(Italy) Massimo Liverani (Italy) Valeria Strada	–	(Italy) Nicola Ventura (Italy) Monica Porta
