= 2015 FIA Alternative Energies Cup =

Seasons
- ← 2014 2016 →

The 2015 FIA Alternative Energies Cup is the ninth season of the FIA Alternative Energies Cup, a world championship for vehicles with alternative energy propulsion organized by the Fédération Internationale de l'Automobile.

For the final classifications of the Cup the sum of up to three best results for each Category or amalgamated Category of vehicles will be taken into account.

== Calendar and winners ==
Date	Race	Winners cat. VII - VIII		Winners cat. IIIA	
30-31 Jan	(Italy) Eco-Snow Trophy	(Italy) Nicola Ventura (Italy) Guido Guerrini	Abarth	(Italy) Fuzzy Kofler (Italy) Hanno Mayr	Volkswagen
18–22 March	(Monaco) Rallye Montecarlo	(Italy) Nicola Ventura (Italy) Guido Guerrini	Abarth	(Monaco) Pascal Ferry (France) Aurore Ferry	Renault
15–17 May	Ecorally San Marino-Vaticano	(Poland) Artur Prusak (France) Thierry Benchetrit	Toyota	(Spain) Jesus Echave (Spain) Juanan Delgado	Kia
29–30 May	(Spain) Ecorallye Vasco Navarro	(Spain) Iker Torrontegui Llona (Spain) Igor Casado Basabe	Toyota	(Spain) Jesus Echave (Spain) Juanan Delgado	Kia
6–7 June	(Italy) Ecorally Della Mendola	(Poland) Artur Prusak (France) Thierry Benchetrit	Toyota	(Spain) Jesus Echave (Spain) Juanan Delgado	Kia
31 July-2 August	(Bulgaria) Eco-Rally	(Italy) Massimo Liverani (Italy) Fulvio Ciervo	Alfa Romeo	-	-
3–4 October	(Greece) Hi-Tech Eco Mobility Rally	(Poland) Artur Prusak (France) Thierry Benchetrit	Toyota	(Greece) Antonis Adanalis (Greece) Paraskevi Loukaki	BMW

== Championship standings ==
=== Drivers' championships Cat. VII-VIII ===
Points	Driver
60	(Poland) Artur Prusak
52	(Italy) Massimo Liverani
48	(Italy) Nicola Ventura

=== Co-Drivers' championships Cat. VII-VIII ===
Points	Driver
60	(France) Thierry Benchetrit
48	(Italy) Guido Guerrini
48	(Italy) Valeria Strada
