= 2011 FIA Alternative Energies Cup =

Seasons
- ← 2010 2012 →

The 2011 FIA Alternative Energies Cup was a season of the FIA Alternative Energies Cup, a world championship for vehicles with alternative energy propulsion organized by the Fédération Internationale de l'Automobile. The season had eight rallies, beginning with Rally Montecarlo on 3 April.

For the final classifications, 50% rounded up of the best results plus one was taken into account.

== Calendar and winners cat. VII & VIII ==
Date	Race	Winner	Co-Driver	Car
April 3, 2011	(Monaco) 5^{e} Rallye Montecarlo	(France) Raymond Durand	(France) Bernard Vialar	(Japan) Toyota Auris
May 8, 2011	(Belgium) Clean Week 2020, Zolder	(Italy) Massimo Liverani	(Italy) Alessandro Talmelli	(Italy) Fiat Croma JTD
August 14, 2011	(Iceland) Rally Reykjavík	(France) Raymond Durand	(France) Bernard Vialar	(Japan) Toyota Auris
August 27, 2011	(Spain) III Eco Rallye Vasco Navarro, Vitoria-Gasteiz	(Spain) Txema Foronda	(Spain) Pilar Rodas	(Japan) Toyota Prius
September 25, 2011	(Greece) 5th High-Tech Ecomobility Rally, Athens	(Italy) Massimo Liverani	(Italy) Alessandro Talmelli	(Italy) Fiat Croma JTD
September 30, 2011	(Italy) Green Prix Eco Targa, Palermo	(Italy) Massimo Liverani	(Italy) Valeria Strada	(Italy) Fiat Croma JTD
October 2, 2011	(Canada) Rallye Énergie Alternative, Montreal	(Canada) Sebastien Kroetsch	(Canada) Eric B. Meunier	(Japan) Lexus CT 200h
October 16, 2011	6° Ecorally San Marino – Città del Vaticano	(Italy) Roberto Viganò	(Italy) Andrea Fovana	(Italy) Alfa Romeo Mito

== Driver Standings cat. VII & VIII ==
Points	Driver
82	(Italy) Massimo Liverani
66	(Italy) Guido Guerrini
58	(France) Raymond Durand
56	(Spain) Jesús Echave
20	(Spain) Txema Foronda, (Canada) Sébastien Kroetsch, (Italy) Roberto Viganò, (Italy) Vincenzo Di Bella
18	(France) Frédéric Thizy
16	(Italy) Gianmaria Aghem, (Iceland) Kristján Einar Kristjánsson, (Spain) Adrian Oiarbide
12	(Switzerland) Massimo Beltrami, (Spain) Maykel Del Cyd, (Canada) Vinh Pham
10	(Belgium) Maarten Longueville, (Greece) Aristotelis Kosmas, (Canada) Martyn Ouellet, (San Marino) Stefano Pezzi
8	(France) Océane Pozzo, (Belgium) Eric Van Wesemael, (Iceland) Gunnar Pálsson, (Greece) Nikolaos Karapanagiotis, (Canada) Yves Boulanger
6	(Belgium) Frédérique Vervisch, (Iceland) Dali (Örn Ingólfsson), (Greece) Ioannis Kepetzis, (Canada) Pierre Girard, (Albania) Desara Muriqi
4	(Spain) Luis Murguia, (Belgium) Michel Meulemans, (United Kingdom) Jon Knighton, (Spain) Mireia Saizar, (Greece) Miltos Tsoskounoglou, (Canada) Pascal Tourangeau, (Italy) Massimiliano Sorghi
2	(France) Christophe Ponset, (Iceland) Bjarney Annelsdóttir, (Spain) Eduardo Encina, (Canada) Pierre Piché

== Co-Driver Standings cat. VII & VIII ==
Points	Co-Driver
56	(Spain) Juanan Delgado
48	(Italy) Valeria Strada
40	(France) Bernard Vialar, (Italy) Alessandro Talmelli
36	(Italy) Emanuele Calchetti
22	(Italy) Andrea Gnaldi Coleschi
20	(Spain) Pilar Rodas, (Canada) Eric B. Meunier, (Italy) Andrea Fovana, (Italy) Claudio Canale
18	(France) Christian Fine, (France) Yves Pavoux
16	(Italy) Leonardo Burchini, (Italy) Rossella Conti, (Iceland) Haukur Vidar Jonsson, (Spain) Feliz Estibaliz
12	(Switzerland) Giovanni Merzari, (Spain) Carlos García, (Canada) Piotr Nytko
10	(Belgium) Nick Laeremans, (Greece) Vassiliki Kosmas, (Canada) Frédéric Bouchard, (San Marino) Valentino Muccini
8	(France) Jean François, (Belgium) Jan Van Wesemael, (Iceland) Sigurdur Astgeirsson, (Greece) Grigorios Karachalios, (Canada) Martin Cédras
6	(Belgium) Angélique Detavernier, (Iceland) Arni Oli Fridriksson, (Greece) Katerina Sevastou, (Canada) Jean Briand, (Ukraine) Yulia Lutsyk
4	(Spain) Javier Urmeneta, (Belgium) Danny Cami, (United Kingdom) Steve Partridge, (Spain) Iban Zelaia, (Greece) Alexandros Tsoskounoglou, (Canada) David Rozon, (Italy) Fulvio Ciervo
2	(France) Serge Pastor, (Iceland) Gudny Ingibjorg Einarsdottir, (Spain) Alfonso Olarbide, (Canada) Normand Béique

== Manufacturer Standings cat. VII & VIII ==
Points	Manufacturer
92	(Japan) Toyota
84	(Italy) Fiat
76	(Italy) Alfa Romeo
46	(Japan) Honda
28	(United States) Chevrolet
26	(Germany) Volkswagen, (Japan) Lexus
18	(Germany) Mercedes
16	(South Korea) Kia
12	(France) Citroën
10	(China) Gonow, (United States) GMC, (South Korea) Hyundai, (France) Renault
8	(Japan) Subaru
6	(United States) Ford, (Japan) Daihatsu
4	(United States) Chrysler, (Germany) Porsche
2	(France) Peugeot
