= Yulia Lutsyk =

Ukrainian co-rally driver (born 1990)

- Nationality: (Ukraine) Ukrainian
- Born: 10 March 1990 (age 36) Novovolynsk, Ukrainian SSR, Soviet Union

FIA Alternative Energies Cup career
- Former teams: Gonow

Yulia Oleksandrivna Lutsyk (Ukrainian: Юлія Олександрівна Луцик; 10 March 1990) is a Ukrainian rally co-driver.

== Biography ==
Lutsyk was born in Novovolynsk in 1990 and moved with her family to Sansepolcro, Tuscany, Italy in 2003.

In the 2011 FIA Alternative Energies Cup season, with the sixth place obtained in the Ecorally San Marino - Città del Vaticano (together with the Albanian driver Desara Muriqi on Gonow GA200), she reached the best result for a female team in the history of the FIA Alternative Energies Cup. Lutsyk was also the first Ukrainian co-driver to gain points in an official FIA world championship.

== See also ==
- FIA Alternative Energies Cup
