= Isabelle Barciulli =

Italian rally driver (born 1986)

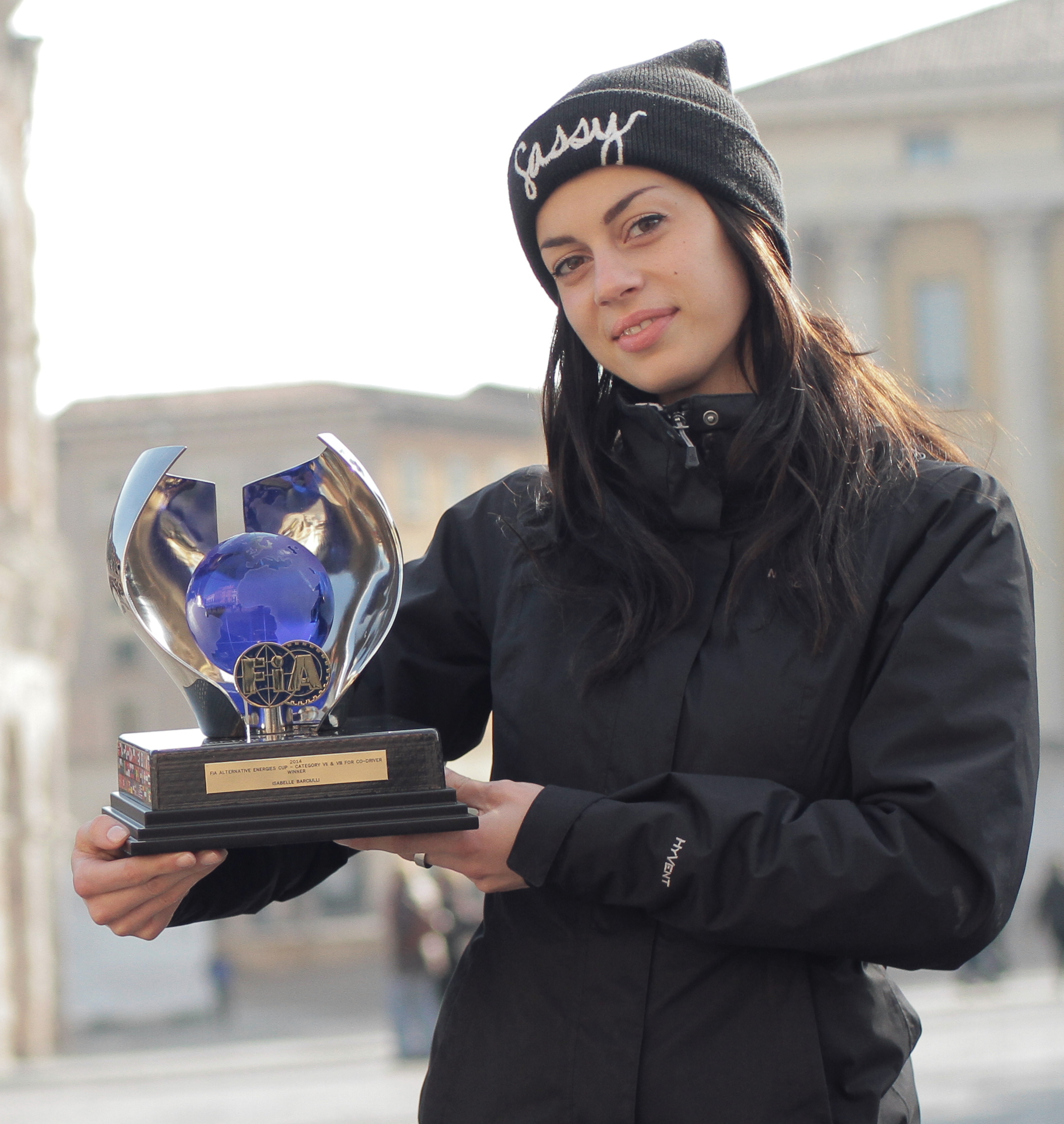
- Nationality: (Italy) Italian
- Born: 21 April 1986 (age 40) Florence, Tuscany, Italy

FIA E-Rally Regularity Cup career
- Former teams: Nissan, Alfa Romeo

Championship titles
- 2014: FIA E-Rally Regularity Cup

Isabelle Barciulli (born 21 April 1986) is an Italian rally driver and co-driver currently competing in the FIA E-Rally Regularity Cup. As a co-driver, she was the 2014 FIA Alternative Energies World Champion.

== Biography ==
Barciulli made her debut in the FIA Alternative Energies Cup as a driver in 2012 paired with Francesca Olivoni. She finished in fifth place at the Hi-Tech Ecomobility Rally in Athens and sixth at the Ecorally San Marino – Città del Vaticano, ending the season in ninth place in the overall standings. In the same year, she participated as co-driver in the Campionato Italiano Energie Alternative alongside Guido Guerrini. In 2013, she managed to score points both as a driver, finishing sixth with Olivoni at the Hi-Tech of Greece and at the Ecorally of San Marino and as a co-driver with Guerrini, having finished second in the Rally Eco Bulgaria. In the 2014 season, she became co-driver world champion as a result of four podiums obtained paired with Guerrini, having finished in second place at the Ecorally della Mendola, the Rally Eco Bulgaria and the Hi-Tech in Athens and third place at the Tesla Rally in Belgrade.

== In other media ==
In 2015, Barciulli made her film debut in Sergio Castellitto's film You Can't Save Yourself Alone.
