= Prusak (surname) =

Prusak or Prusac is a surname. Notable people with the surname include:

- Artur Prusak, Polish rally driver
- Lola Prusac (1895–1985), French fashion designer
- Mikhail Prusak (1960–2025), Russian politician
- Rachel Prusak (born 1975), American politician
- Sergiusz Prusak (born 1979), Polish footballer
