= 2009 FIA Alternative Energies Cup =

Seasons
- ← 2008 2010 →

The 2009 FIA Alternative Energies Cup was a season of the FIA Alternative Energies Cup, a world championship for vehicles with alternative energy propulsion organized by the Fédération Internationale de l'Automobile. The season consisted of six rallies, beginning with Rally Montecarlo on 29 March, and ended with Green Prix Eco Targa on 9 October.

France's Raymond Durand won the Drivers championship, and Toyota secured their third Manufacturers' title.

== Calendar and winners ==
Date	Race	Winner
March 29, 2009	(Monaco) 3^{e} Rallye Montecarlo	(France) Raymond Durand
June 14, 2009	(Italy) Aria Nuova, Monza	(Italy) Giuseppe Invernizzi
July 26, 2009	(Italy) Green Rally dei Laghi, Omegna	(Italy) Giuliano Mazzoni
September 20, 2009	4° Ecorally San Marino – Città del Vaticano	(France) Raymond Durand
September 29, 2009	(Canada) Rallye Énergie Alternative, Montreal	(Canada) Martyn Ouellet
October 9, 2009	(Italy) Green Prix Eco Targa, Palermo	(Italy) Giuliano Mazzoni

== Driver Standings ==
Points	Driver (First places)
48	(France) Raymond Durand
36	(Italy) Giuliano Mazzoni
20	(Canada) Martyn Ouellet, (Italy) Vincenzo Di Bella
16	(Spain) Luis Murguia

== Manufacturer Standings ==
Points	Manufacturer (First places)
62	(Japan) Toyota
45	(Japan) Honda
36	(Germany) Opel
28	(France) Citroën
27	(Italy) Fiat
