= 2013 FIA Alternative Energies Cup =

Seasons
- ← 2012 2014 →

The 2013 FIA Alternative Energies Cup is a season of the FIA Alternative Energies Cup, a world championship for vehicles with alternative energy propulsion organized by the Fédération Internationale de l'Automobile.

For the final classifications, 50% rounded up of the best results plus one is taken into account.

== Calendar and winners ==
Date	Race	Winners cat. VII/VIII		Winners cat. III	
March 20, 2013	(Monaco) Rallye Montecarlo	(France) Jean Verrier (France) Jean Rick	(Japan) Honda Civic	(Monaco) Jean Ferry (Monaco) Patrick Curti	(Japan) Mitsubishi i-MiEV
May 31, 2013	(Spain) V Eco Rallye Vasco Navarro, Vitoria-Gasteiz	(Spain) Txema Foronda (Spain) Pilar Rodas	(Japan) Toyota Prius	(France) James Morlaix (France) Sébastien Chol	(United States) Tesla Roadster
June 8, 2013	(Italy) 2° Mendola-Mendel Ecorally	(Italy) Roberto Viganò (Italy) Andrea Fovana	(Italy) Alfa Romeo MiTo	(Italy) Fuzzy Kofler (Italy) Luca Gastaldi	(Norway) Think City
June 28, 2013	(Italy) 2° Sestriere Ecorally	(Italy) Roberto Viganò (Italy) Andrea Fovana	(Italy) Alfa Romeo MiTo	(Italy) Fuzzy Kofler (Italy) Franco Gaioni	(Norway) Think City
July 10, 2013	(Serbia) 2nd Tesla Rally, Belgrade	(Italy) Massimo Liverani (Italy) Fulvio Ciervo	(Italy) Abarth 500	(France) James Morlaix (France) Sébastien Chol	(United States) Tesla Roadster
July 19, 2013	Rally Eco Bulgaria	(Italy) Massimo Liverani (Italy) Fulvio Ciervo	(Italy) Abarth 500	(Spain) Jesús Echave (Spain) Juanan Delgado	(Japan) Mitsubishi i-MiEV
October 5, 2013	(Greece) Hi-Tech Ecomobility Rally, Athens	(Italy) Massimo Liverani (Italy) Fulvio Ciervo	(Italy) Abarth 500	(France) James Morlaix (France) Janiel Collet	(United States) Tesla Roadster
October 18, 2013 (cat. VII/VIII)	8° Ecorally San Marino – Vaticano	(Italy) Massimo Liverani (Italy) Valeria Strada	(Italy) Abarth 500		

== Driver Standings cat. VII & VIII ==
Points	Driver
88	(Italy) Massimo Liverani
64	(Italy) Guido Guerrini
26	(Italy) Roberto Vigano, (Slovenia) Gregor Zdovc

== Co-Driver Standings cat. VII & VIII ==
Points	Co-Driver
60	(Italy) Fulvio Ciervo
39	(Italy) Francesca Olivoni
34	(Italy) Valeria Strada

== Manufacturer Standings cat. VII & VIII ==
Points	Manufacturer
96	(Italy) Abarth
74	(Italy) Alfa Romeo
64	(Japan) Toyota
42	(Germany) Opel
30	(Romania) Dacia
28	(Japan) Honda
26	(France) Peugeot
24	(Japan) Infiniti
16	(France) Renault
12	(Germany) Audi
10	(Japan) Nissan, (Czech Republic) Škoda

== Driver Standings cat. III ==
Points	Driver
54	(France) James Morlaix
39	(Spain) Jesus Echave
38	(Italy) Fuzzy Kofler

== Co-Driver Standings cat. III ==
Points	Co-Driver
50	(France) Sébastien Chol
39	(Spain) Juanan Delgado
34	(France) Frederic Mlynarczyc

== Manufacturer Standings cat. VII & VIII ==
Points	Manufacturer
54	(United States) Tesla Motors
44	(Japan) Mitsubishi
40	(Norway) Think City
28	(Romania) Dacia Metron
16	(France) Peugeot
11	(Japan) Nissan
