= Emanuele Calchetti =

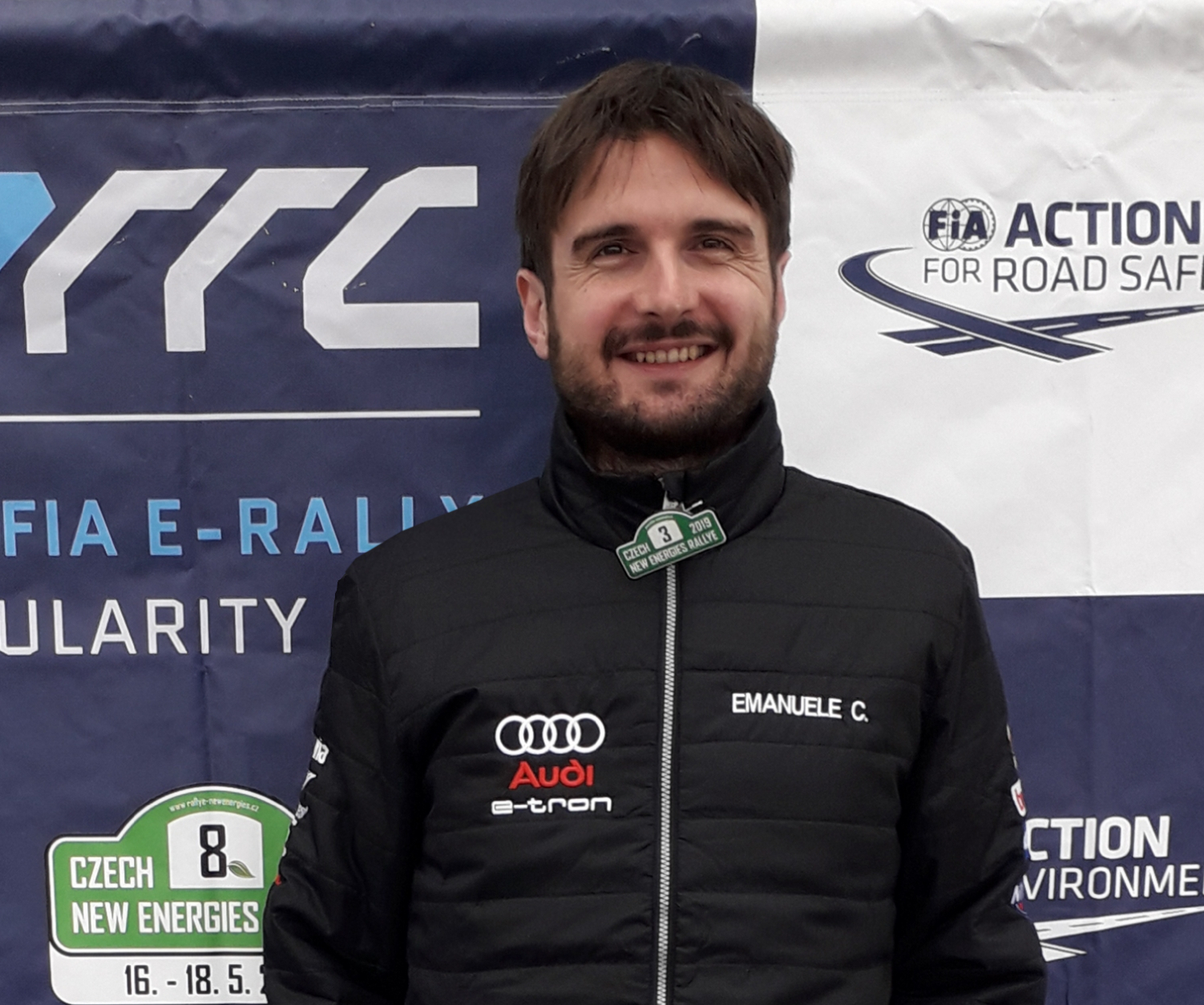
- Emanuele Calchetti at the start of the Czech New Energies Rallye. Rainbach im Mühlkreis, May 16, 2019.
- Nationality: (Italy) Italian
- Born: 2 February 1981 (age 45) Sansepolcro

FIA Electric and New Energy Championship career
- Former teams: Citroën, Alfa Romeo, Audi
- Starts: 30
- Wins: 2

Championship titles
- 2012: FIA Alternative Energies Cup
- Statistics up to date as of 10-29-2019.

Emanuele Calchetti (Italian pronunciation: [emanuˈɛːle kalˈketti]; born 2 February 1981 in Sansepolcro) is an Italian rally co-driver, in 2012 FIA Alternative Energies World Champion.

== Biography ==
Calchetti has participated in the FIA Alternative Energies World Champion since 2010. During that season, with the driver Guido Guerrini, he won the regularity standings of the circuit race in Monza (with Citroën C1) and Franciacorta (Citroën C5).

In 2011, with Alfa Romeo Mito, he gained the second place in San Marino and the third place in Athens.

In 2012, again with Alfa Romeo Mito, Calchetti became World Champion in the co-drivers' category, winning in Athens and arriving second in Montréal and Belgrade.

In 2019 he came back to the races with Guido Guerrini on an Audi e-tron in the FIA E-Rally Regularity Cup. Toscan crew won in Switzerland (Rallye du Chablais) and reached the podium other six times, finishing the season at the third place of the general standings and winning the manufacturers' championship.

In 2024 Guerrini and Calchetti, on a Nio ET5, conquered the first EcoRally Cup China, winning 3 of the 5 stages and the final classification of Greater Huangshan International Ecorally held in the Anhui province.

Journalist, Calchetti is since 2008 a member of the City council of Sansepolcro. In 2011 he wrote with Guido Guerrini the travel book Via Stalingrado (Stalingrad Road). In 2016 he voiced the Italian character of Gianni, played by Enzo Cilenti, in the Russian version of British film Bridget Jones's Baby.

== Bibliography ==
- (in Italian) Emanuele Calchetti, Guido Guerrini, Via Stalingrado, Petruzzi Editore, Città di Castello, 2011, pp. 216. ISBN 978-88-89797-31-0.
- (in Italian) Emanuele Calchetti, Socialismo lunare, in 70 ore nel futuro, Fuorionda, 2013, pp. 180. ISBN 978-88-97426-42-4.
- (in Italian) Emanuele Calchetti, Siberia, in Guido Guerrini, Eurasia. Dall'Atlantico al Pacifico con il gas naturale, Sansepolcro, 2018. ISBN 978-88-94407-60-0.
