= 2014 FIA Alternative Energies Cup =

Seasons
- ← 2013 2015 →

The 2014 FIA Alternative Energies Cup was the eighth season of the FIA Alternative Energies Cup, a world championship for vehicles with alternative energy propulsion organized by the Fédération Internationale de l'Automobile.

For the fourth successive year, Massimo Liverani won the Category VII/VIII title for hybrid vehicles, despite winning only one of the seven events during the season. He won the championship by 24 points ahead of Guido Guerrini, who finished as the championship runner-up for the fourth successive year. Third place went to Kalin Dedikov, who won his home event in Bulgaria. The other wins were shared by Sylvain Blondeau, Txema Foronda, Massimo Zanasi, Gregor Zdovc, as well as Roberto Viganò, who was ineligible to score points towards the championship. Guerrini's co-driver Isabelle Barciulli was the winner of the co-drivers' championship, as Liverani used both Valeria Strada and Fulvio Ciervo during the season. Strada finished second to Barciulli, four points in arrears. Abarth were the winners of the manufacturers' championship.

In the all-electric Category III, it was Walter Kofler who claimed the championship title, after winning four out of the category's seven events. His tally of 50 points was over 4 times that of his nearest competitor, James Morlaix, who scored 11. Jesús Echave, Greg Jonkerlinck and Akash Makhan shared third place overall, with one-off category victories. Franco Gaioni was the winner of the co-drivers' championship, with Think the winners of the manufacturers' championship.

== Calendar and winners ==
| Date | Race | Winners cat. III | | Winners cat. VII/VIII | |
|---|---|---|---|---|---|
| March 19 | (Monaco) Rallye Montecarlo | (France) Greg Jonkerlinck (France) Yves Munier | (France) Renault Zoe | (France) Sylvain Blondeau (France) Jean-Luc Hasler | (Germany) Opel Ampera |
| May 9 | Ecorally San Marino-Vaticano | Not held | | (Italy) Massimo Zanasi (Italy) Giuseppe Scalora | (Italy) Fiat Multipla |
| May 30 | (Spain) Ecorallye Vasco Navarro | (Spain) Jesús Echave (Spain) Juanan Delgado | (Germany) BMW i3 | (Spain) Txema Foronda (Spain) Pilar Rodas | (Germany) BMW i3 |
| June 7 | (Italy) Ecorally Della Mendola | (Italy) Fuzzy Kofler (Italy) Josef Unterholzner | (Norway) Think City | (Italy) Roberto Viganò (Italy) Andrea Fovana | (Italy) Alfa Romeo MiTo |
| July 10 | (Serbia) Tesla Rally | (Italy) Fuzzy Kofler (Italy) Franco Gaioni | (Norway) Think City | (Slovenia) Gregor Zdovc (Slovenia) Ana Ivanšek | (Japan) Toyota Prius |
| July 25 | (Bulgaria) Eco-Rally | (Italy) Fuzzy Kofler (Italy) Franco Gaioni | (Norway) Think City | (Bulgaria) Kalin Dedikov (Bulgaria) Georgi Pavlov | (China) Great Wall C30 |
| October 4 | (Greece) Hi-Tech Eko Mobility Rally | (Italy) Fuzzy Kofler (Italy) Franco Gaioni | (Norway) Think City | (Italy) Massimo Liverani (Italy) Valeria Strada | (Italy) Abarth 500 |

== Championship standings ==
=== Drivers' championships ===
==== Category VII/VIII ====
| Points | Driver First positions |
|---|---|
| 80 | (Italy) Massimo Liverani |
| 62 | (Italy) Guido Guerrini |
| 34 | (Bulgaria) Kalin Dedikov |
| 20 | (France) Sylvain Blondeau |

=== Co-drivers' championships ===
==== Category VII/VIII ====
| Points | Driver First positions |
|---|---|
| 62 | (Italy) Isabelle Barciulli |
| 58 | (Italy) Valeria Strada |
| 34 | (Bulgaria) Georgi Pavlov |
| 28 | (Italy) Fulvio Ciervo |

=== Manufacturers' championships ===
==== Category VII/VIII ====
| Points | Manufacturer First positions |
|---|---|
| 86 | (Italy) Abarth |
| 64 | (Italy) Alfa Romeo |
| 52 | (Japan) Toyota |
| 37 | (Germany) Opel |
