= Nio ET5 =

Battery electric compact executive car

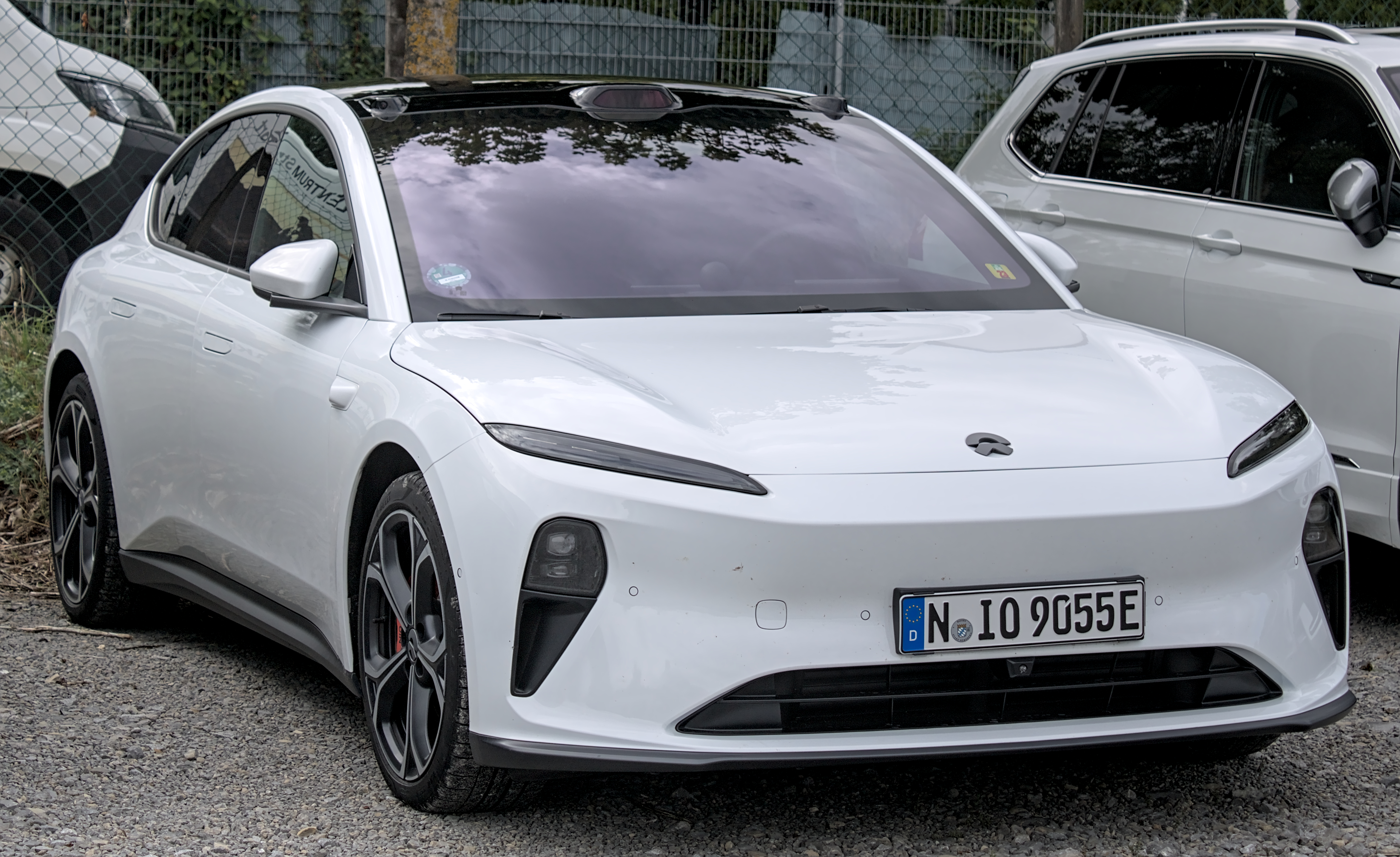

Overview
- Manufacturer: Nio Inc.
- Production: September 2022 – present
- Assembly: China: Hefei, Anhui

Body and chassis
- Class: Compact executive car (D)
- Body style: 4-door sedan; 5-door station wagon
- Layout: Dual-motor, all-wheel-drive
- Platform: NT 2.0/NT 2.5

Powertrain
- Electric motor: AC induction, permanent magnet synchronous
- Power output: 358 kW (487 PS; 480 hp)
- Battery: 75 kWh LFP CATL; 100 kWh NMC CATL/CALB; 150 kWh semi-solid state NMC WeLion
- Electric range: 550–1,000 km (342–621 mi) (NEDC)

Dimensions
- Wheelbase: 2,888 mm (113.7 in)
- Length: 4,790 mm (188.6 in)
- Width: 1,960 mm (77.2 in)
- Height: 1,499 mm (59.0 in)
- Curb weight: 2,145–2,245 kg (4,729–4,949 lb)

The Nio ET5 is a battery electric compact executive car manufactured by Chinese electric car company Nio since 2022. A wagon version called the Nio ET5T or ET5 Touring was introduced in 2023.

== Overview ==
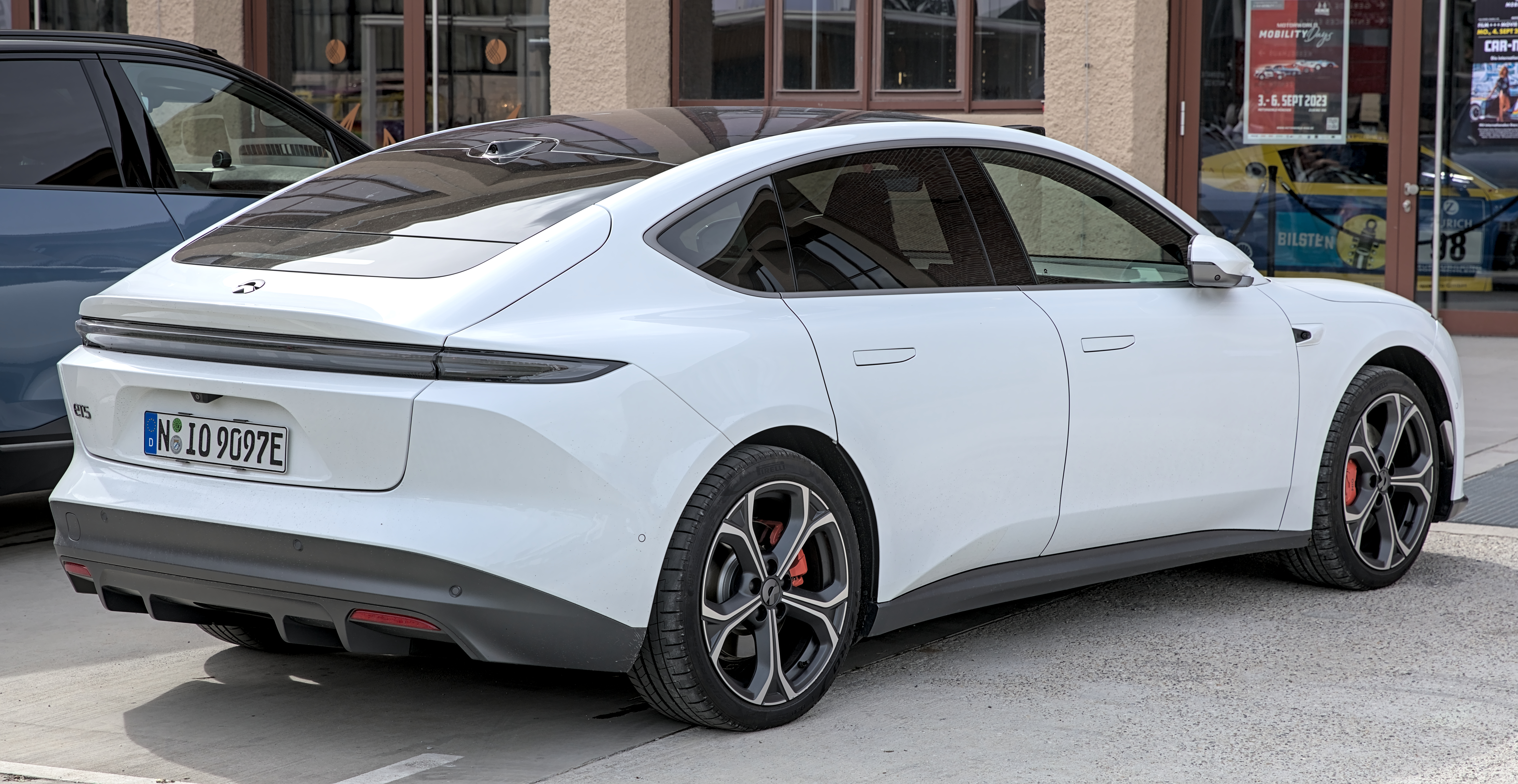
Rear view

The Nio ET5 was unveiled in China on 18 December 2021 at the 'Nio Day' event in Suzhou's Olympic Sports Centre. It was on sale in September 2022 with a starting price of ¥328.000 (~US$46,100) and acts as a direct competitor to Tesla's Model 3 sedan and the Xpeng P7.

The ET5's exterior design is said to evoke Nio's EP9 supercar DNA and be ready for "Autonomous Driving”. ET5 is 4,790 mm (188.6 in) long and integrates high-performance autonomous driving sensors. The car has a rear ducktail spoiler, front air curtain, flush doorhandles, soft close doors and frameless windows to improve aerodynamic efficiency, achieving a drag coefficient of 0.24C_{d}. The car has a 1.28m² panoramic roof, said to protect up to 99.9% of UV rays from the sun.

The interior of the ET5 features a panoramic digital cockpit with AR and VR technology. ET5's interior was inspired by trends in furniture, fashion, and footwear. It features new colours such Terracotta, a deep and fiery orange. ET5 features a range of recycled and more sustainable materials such as Clean+ sustainable fabric. Like the Nio ET7, ET5 has invisible air vents and 256 colour ambient lights. A Dolby Atmos 7.1.4 surround sound system, standard on the car.

=== ET5T/ET5 Touring ===
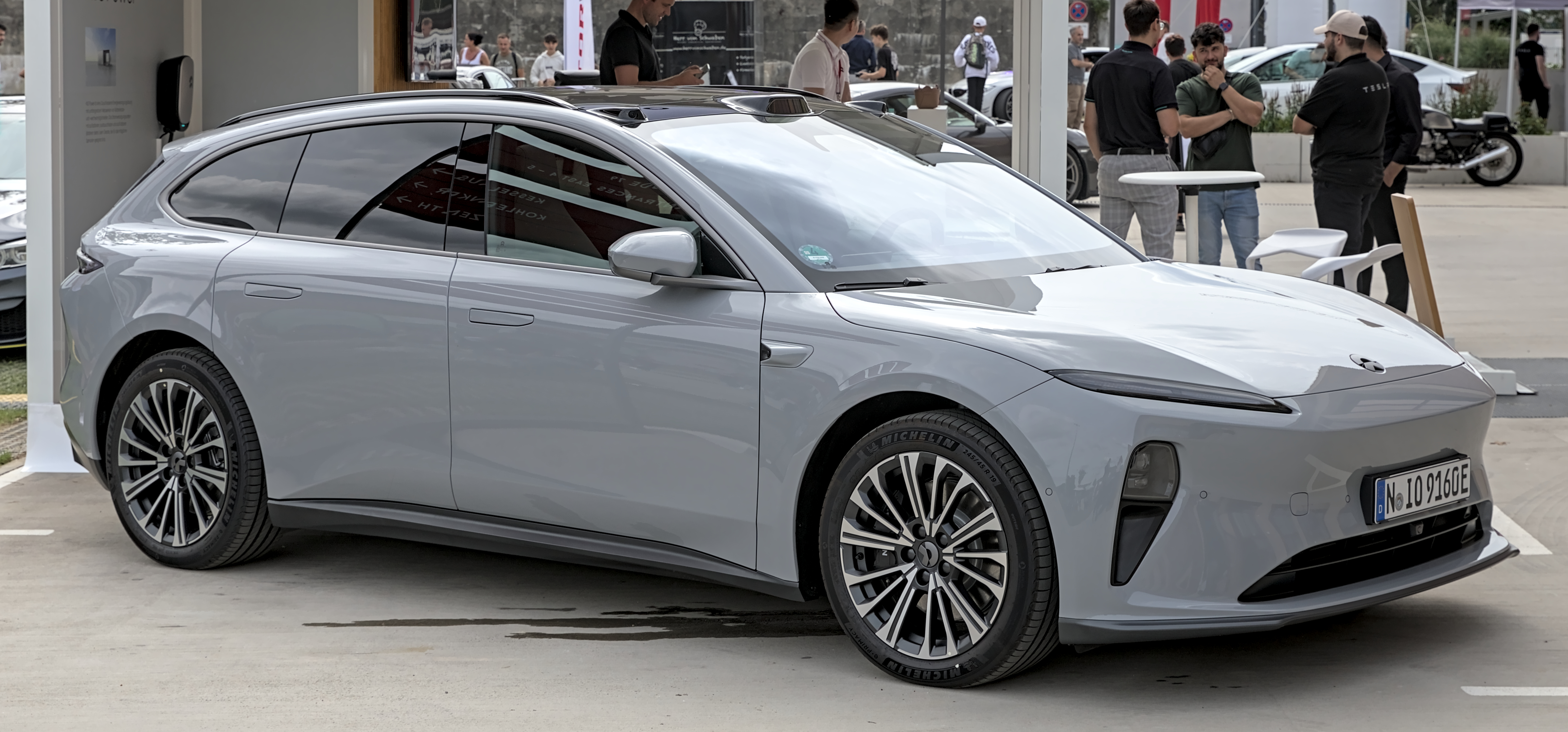
Nio ET5T (front view)

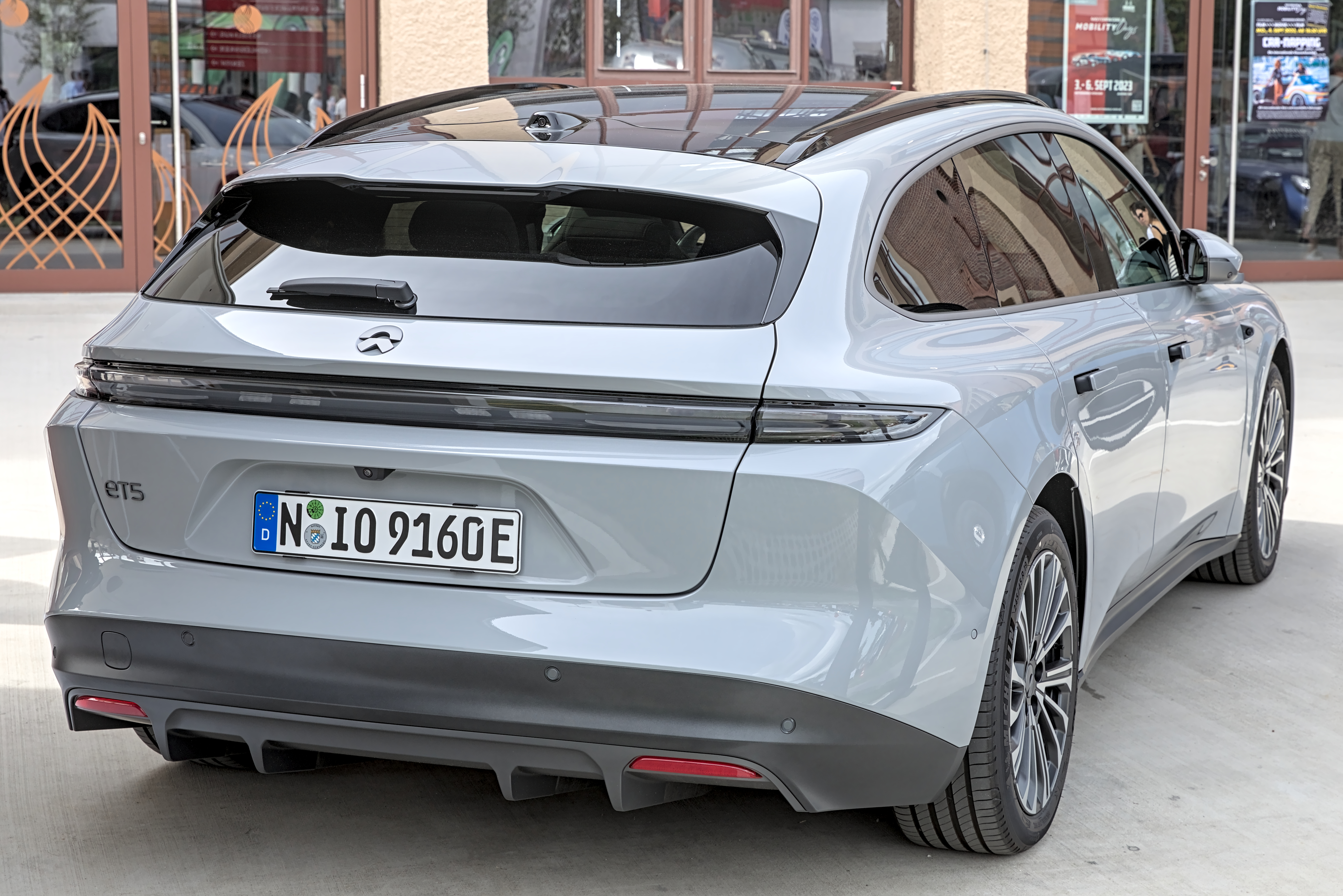
Nio ET5T (rear view)

The Touring model was unveiled on 16 June 2023 and measures in the same length as the sedan. The only differences compared to the sedan were the Touring model has 17mm additional headroom and a boot space of 470 L (17 cu ft) that expands to 1,300 L (46 cu ft) when the 40:20:40 rear seats are folded down.

=== Facelift (2025) ===
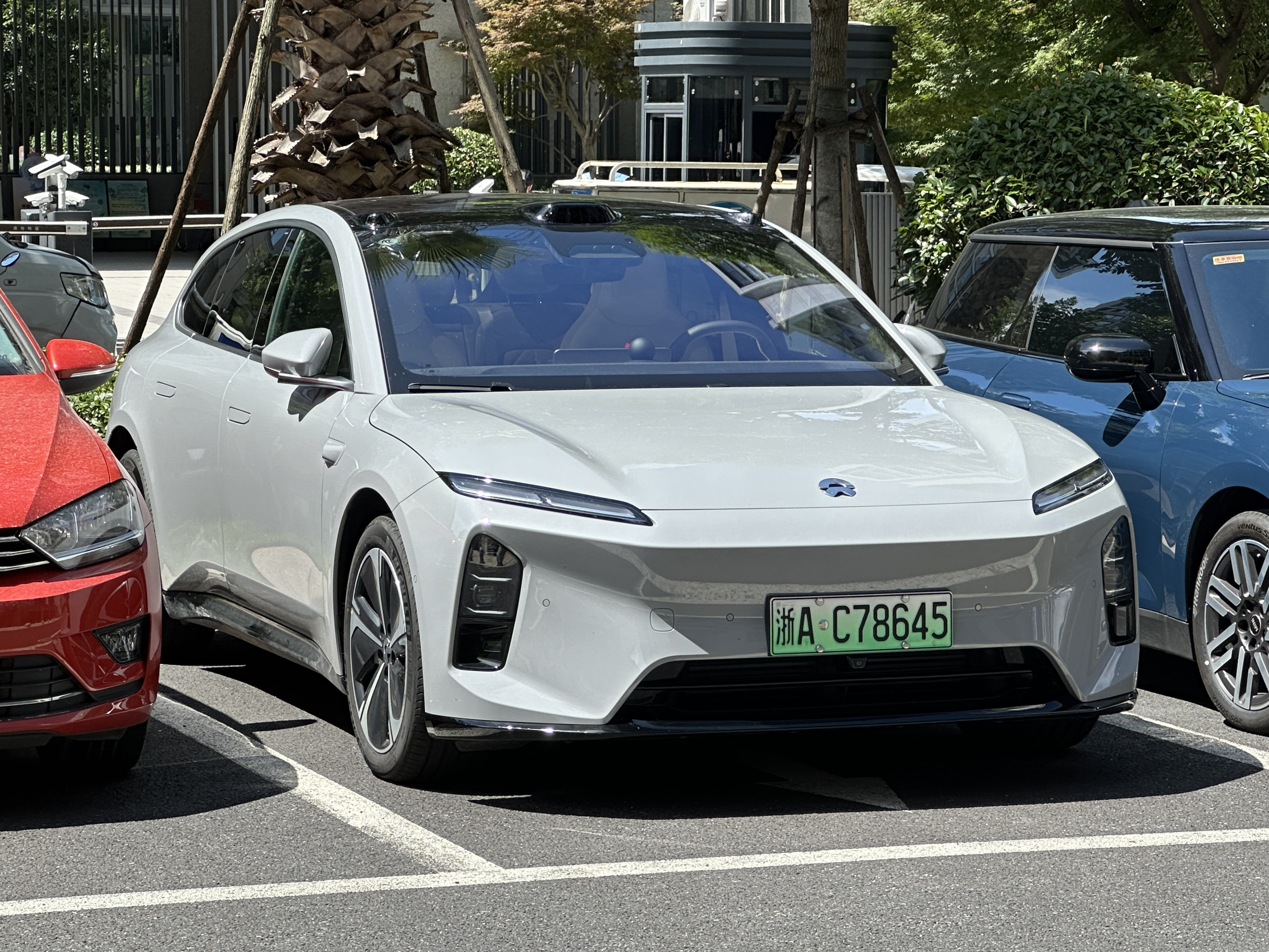
Nio ET5T 2025 (facelift)

On 10 May 2025, Nio revealed a refreshed version of the ET5 and ET5T, with deliveries beginning on 27 May. It is based on the NT2.5 platform, and features similar updates to the ES6/EC6 refresh released in the same month.

The exterior features minor changes, with the addition of adaptive driving beam headlights with a rectangular headlight module shape and adjusted daytime running lights, new black accents on the side skirts and diffuser, new 5-spoke 20-inch wheels with aerodynamic inserts, and the addition of two new paint colors: Glow and New Moon Silver.

In the interior, the central infotainment touchscreen has been upgraded to a 15.6-inch AMOLED panel and is now horizontally oriented to improve split-screen functionality, and the existing 10.25-inch digital instrument cluster is now complemented by a 50-inch AR-HUD. Additionally, it is now equipped with a digital rearview mirror, and the shifter has been moved to the steering column allowing space for dual 50-watt active-cooled wireless charging pads and redesigned cupholders in the center console. Additionally, the seats have been redesigned with a lower seating position and extended thigh support, with 14-way adjustment with heating, ventilation, and massage functions. along with a new upholstery quilting pattern. It features a 23-speaker 7.1.4 sound system and an auto-dimming panoramic sunroof.

The ADAS system has been updated, and now uses a single of Nio's self-developed Shenji NX3091 SoC, which Nio claims performs better than the previous Adam system which consists of four Nvida Orin-X chips with a total of 1016 TOPS. It uses a sensor-suite called Aquila which consists of 29 sensors, including a 300-line equivalent LiDAR unit and 4D mmWave radars. The refreshed ET5 is now equipped with continuous damping control and hydraulic dampers, the suspension and steering has been retuned, and the sound insulation has been improved.

The powertrain remains unchanged, but all models are now equipped with previously missing AC charging capabilities. Sedan models achieve CLTC range estimates of 585, 740, 1,055 km (364, 460, 656 mi) and 550, 710, 1,010 km (342, 441, 628 mi) for Touring models with the 75, 100, and 150 kWh battery options respectively. Touring models also have a 1,400 kg (3,100 lb) towing capacity.

=== Update (2026) ===
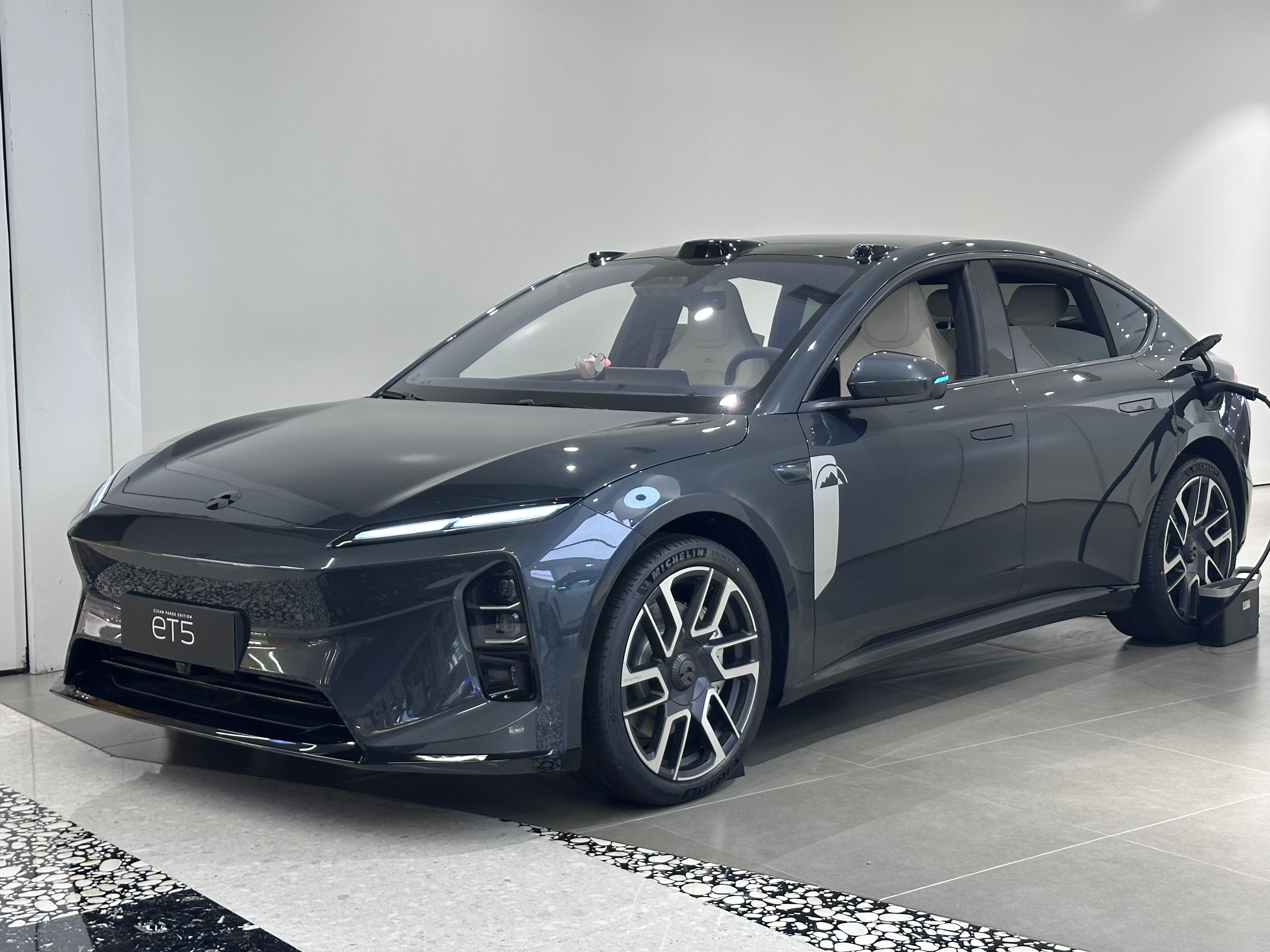
Nio ET5 Clean Parks Edition (2026)

The 2026 model year adds the intelligent driving status indicator light to the exterior mirrors and updated Moon 3.0 exterior kit applying a matte black finish to trims and badges. Additionally, Intelligent driving runs on the Cedar S 1.4.6 version. Previous optional features including heated steering wheel, front seat ventilation and massage, rear seat heating, negative ion air purification, Nappa leather seats, and micro-suede headliner are all standard across the range for the 2026 model year. A special Clean Parks Edition was also available for the 2026 model year ET5, ET5T, ES6 and EC6, adding exclusive decals, Easter egg details on accessories, and a new set of 20" wheel.

== Specifications ==
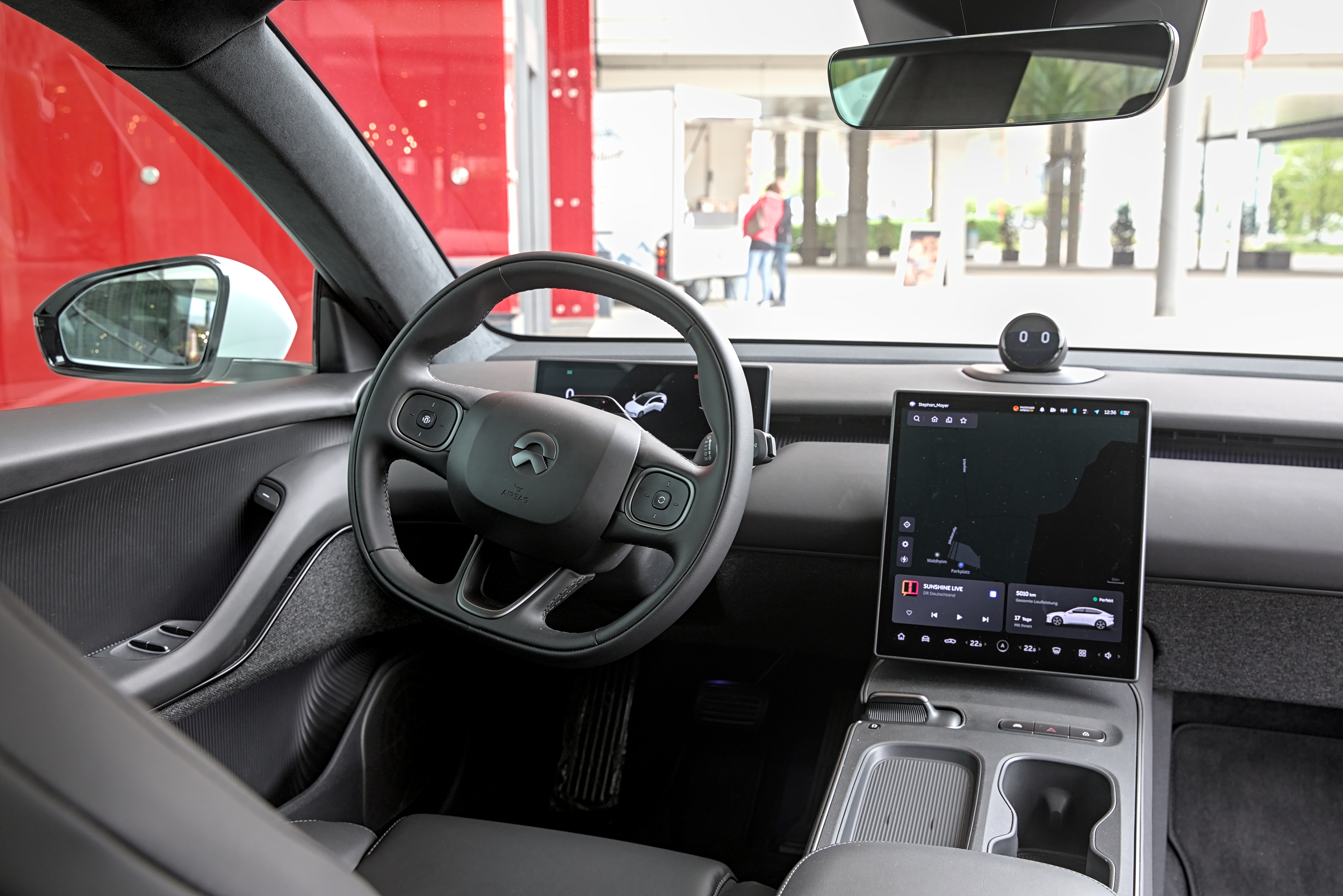
Interior

The ET5 is compatible with Nio Power's battery swap stations that allow the vehicle swap the battery in a few minutes and, as of 2026, are available in China, Norway, and Germany.

The ET5 has two electric motors: a 150 kW (201 hp; 204 PS) induction motor in the front, and a 210 kW (282 hp; 286 PS) permanent magnet motor in the rear of the car, which produce a combined output of 480 hp (358 kW; 487 PS) and 700 N⋅m (520 lb⋅ft). The 0 to 100 km/h (0 to 62 mph) acceleration time is 4.0 seconds and the braking distance from 100 to 0 km/h (62 to 0 mph) is 33.9 m (111.2 ft).

=== Battery and range ===
The Nio ET5 comes available with two battery options: a 75 kWh battery with 550 km (342 mi) NEDC range or 445 km (277 mi) WLTP range, and a 100 kWh battery with 700 km (435 mi) NEDC range or 580 km (360 mi) WLTP range. Additionally, a 150 kWh Ultra High Range semi-solid-state battery with an NEDC range of 1,000 km (621 mi) and a cell energy density of 360 Wh/kg is available for short term rental from a swap station.

== Motorsport ==
In 2024 Nio ET5 won the first EcoRally Cup China with the Italian driver Guido Guerrini and co-driver Emanuele Calchetti.

== Safety ==
Euro NCAP test results Nio ET5 19" rims 75 kWh (2023)
Test	Points	%
Overall:	5 /5 stars	
Adult occupant:	38.5	96%
Child occupant:	42.0	85%
Pedestrian:	52.5	83%
Safety assist:	14.7	81%

== Sales ==
Year	China	
Year	ET5	ET5T
2022	11,813	—
2023	40,848	21,361
2024	26,510	50,869
2025	16,665	47,571

== Awards ==
In December 2022, the ET5 was chosen as one of the Top 10 cars in China and won the Special Interior Design award in the 10th annual Xuanyuan awards, run by EFS Consulting and Automotive Business Review.
