= Michal Žďárský =

Czech rally driver

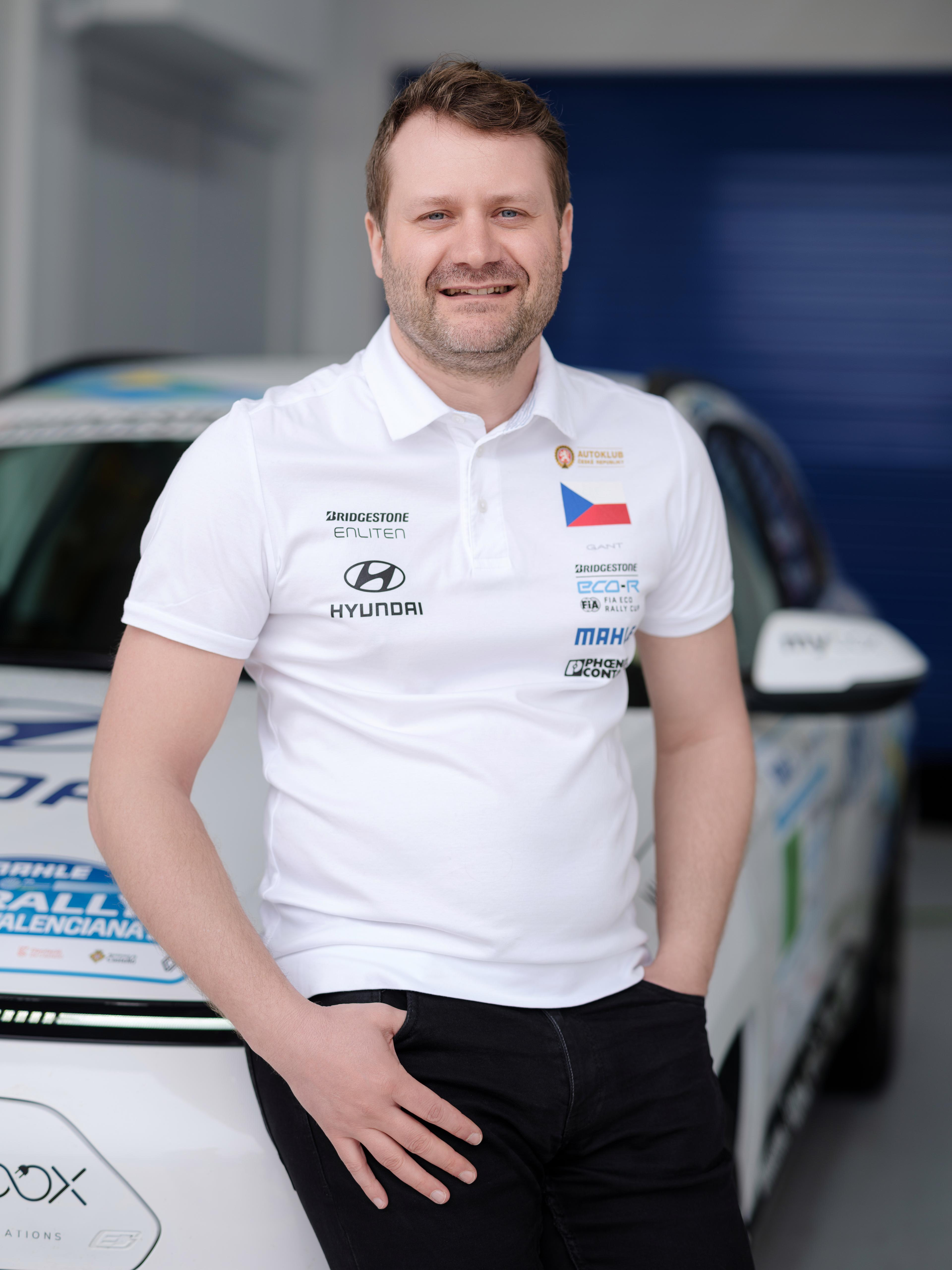
- Nationality: (Czech Republic) Czech
- Born: 1982 (age 43–44) Prague, Czech Republic
- Current team: ACCR Hyundai Janík Motorsport

Championship titles
- 2023 2024: FIA ecoRally Cup

Michal Žďárský (Prague, 1982) is a journalist, Czech rally driver, in 2023, 2024 winner of the Bridgestone FIA ecoRally Cup. Champion of Czech Championship ecoRally in years 2022, 2023, 2024, 2025.

== Career ==
He and co-driver Jakub Nábělek, in a Hyundai Kona, placed third in the FIA ecoRally Cup in 2021 and 2022 and won the championship in 2023 and 2024. They won 5 times (2021, 2022, 2024, 2025 and 2026) the Czech New Energies Rallye in Český Krumlov, twice (2023 e 2024) the Oeiras Eco Rally and once (2024) the Eco Rallye de la Comunitat Valenciana in Castellón de la Plana, Slovenia MAHLE Eco Rallye, Eco Rally Scotland, Swiss Eco Rally, Rally China and the eRally Iceland. In 2025 Žďárský also placed first in the Greater Hungshan International EcoRally Cup China.

During 2026 season team of Michal Žďárský switch the cars after Eco Rallye de la Comunitat Valenciana and after Hyundai Kona Electris they started to race with smaller Hyundai Inster. They won 4 rallies in a row - Czech New Energies Cesky Krumlov, MAHLE Eco Rally Slovenia and both Baltics - Eco Rally Litguania and Neste MY Renewable Charge EV Rally Latvia 2026.

Czech representative, Team ACCR Hyundai Janík Motorsport.

A former floorball player, Žďárský became a referee in the Czech Superliga florbalu.
