= Eneko Conde Pujana =

Spanish rally driver

Eneko Conde
- Nationality: (Spain) Spanish
- Born: 1978 (age 47–48) Basauri, Spain
- Current team: Kia Motors

Championship titles
- 2021, 2022: FIA ecoRally Cup

Eneko Conde Pujana (Basauri, 1978) is a Spanish rally driver.

== Career ==
He won FIA E-Rally Regularity Cup in 2021 with co-driver Loren Serrano and in 2022 with co-driver Lukas Sergnese. From 2016 to 2021 he won six times Spanish championship for alternative energies.
