= Jakub Nábělek =

Czech rally driver

- Nationality: (Czech Republic) Czech
- Born: 1982 (age 43–44) Prague, Czechoslovakia
- Current team: Hyundai

Championship titles
- 2023: FIA ecoRally Cup

Jakub Nábělek (Prague, 1982) is a Czech rally co-driver, in 2023 winner of the FIA ecoRally Cup.

== Career ==
Together with the driver Michal Žďárský on Hyundai Kona concluded in the third place the FIA ecoRally Cup in 2021 and 2022 and won the championship in 2023 and 2024.

A former floorball player, Nábělek became a referee in the Czech Superliga florbalu.
