= Guido Guerrini =

Italian rally driver and co-driver (born 1976)

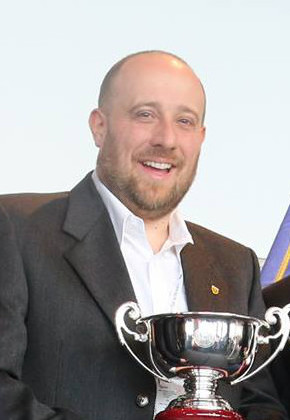
- Guido Guerrini during the award ceremony of the Rallye Monte Carlo des Energies Nouvelles in Monte Carlo, 22 March 2015
- Nationality: (Italy) Italian (San Marino) Sammarinese
- Born: 12 January 1976 (age 50) Arezzo, Italy

FIA Alternative Energies Cup career
- Debut season: 2009
- Current team: Lancia
- Former teams: Citroen, Alfa Romeo, Abarth, Renault, Nissan, Audi, Kia Motors
- Starts: 123
- Wins: 25

Championship titles
- 2025 (driver), 2016, 2017 (co-driver): FIA ecoRally Cup
- Statistics up to date as of 26 October 2026.

Guido Guerrini (born 12 January 1976 in Arezzo, Italy) is an Italian rally driver and co-driver with Russian citizenship, world champion of the FIA ecoRally Cup in 2025 as a driver and in 2016 and 2017 as a co-driver. Since 2016, he is based in Kazan, Russian Federation. Since 2025, he has been competing with a San Marino racing license.

== Career ==
=== Driver ===
Guerrini debuted as a driver in the FIA Alternative Energies Cup in 2009, a competition reserved for hybrid and endothermic vehicles, together with co-driver Andrea Gnaldi Coleschi. In 2010, Guerrini achieved 3rd place in the Italian championship standings and 5th place in the world championship, which was won by French driver Raymond Durand.

The following year, together with co-driver Emanuele Calchetti in an Alfa Romeo MiTo, Guerrini finished second in both the world and Italian championships, behind Massimo Liverani. He repeated the same result in 2012 and 2013. In 2013, he and Emanuele Calchetti also won the Hi-Tech Ecomobility Rally in Athens. In 2014, alongside with Isabelle Barciulli, Guerrini secured another second place in the World Cup and third place in the Italian championship.

In 2019, Guerrini participated as a driver in the FIA E-Rally Regularity Cup with Emanuele Calchetti in an Audi e-tron, winning the manufacturers' championship and finishing third in the drivers' standings. In 2020, together with Francesca Olivoni, he obtained second place in the overall standings of a shortened FIA ERRC season due to Covid19 and won two races of the Italian Championship with Emanuele Calchetti.

In 2021, he participated in the FIA Cup with Francesca Olivoni and, in the last races of the season, with Artur Prusak, who became his co-driver in 2022, 2023 and 2024 in a Kia eNiro. Together, they won the EcoDolomitesGT in Fiera di Primiero three times (2022, 2023 and 2024), the Winter Eco Rally in Östersund twice (2023 and 2024), and the Azores Eco Rallye (2024) and Mahle Eco Rally in Nova Gorica once (2024).

In 2024, Guerrini and Emanuele Calchetti, driving a Nio ET5, conquered the first EcoRally Cup China, winning 3 of the 5 stages and the final classification at the Greater Huangshan International Ecorally in Anhui province.

In 2025, Guido Guerrini competed under a Sammarinese racing licence, achieving together with Artur Prusak the overall victory in the FIA ecoRally Cup. The result was obtained by winning six events (Comunitat Valenciana, Portugal, Ardenne Roads, Madeira, Monte Carlo and Dolomites) and securing three second and three third places over the 13 rounds of the season. The Gass Racing team duo also won the Iberian Eco Rally Challenge.

=== Co-driver ===
In the 2015 season, Guerrini took part in the championships as a co-driver, together with driver Nicola Ventura on an Abarth 500, finishing at second place in the world championship after Thierry Benchetrit and winning the Italian championship ex-aequo with Valeria Strada.

In the 2016 season, Ventura and Guerrini on a Renault Zoe passed to the category reserved for purely electric cars and they won the World Cup. In 2017, Guerrini won the FIA Electric and New Energies Championship, which joined both the previous hybrid and purely electric categories.

In 2026 he took part in the Dakar Rally, alongside Lorenzo Delladio driving a Porsche 959.

== Travels ==
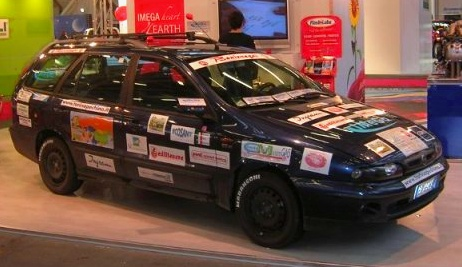
"Turin-Beijing" Fiat Marea at the Bologna Motor Show in 2008.

Guido Guerrini is also a car traveler, the first person to go from Europe to China covering the whole route by a gas-fuelled car.

The project, called Torino-Pechino, la macchina della pace (Turin-Beijing, the peace machine), was organized in 2008: overall, Guerrini and Andrea Gnaldi Coleschi (born 27 October 1978 in Arezzo, Italy), covered 25,852 km (16,064 mi) using a 1999 Fiat Marea 1.6 16V from the seat of the 2006 Winter Olympics (in Turin) to the seat of the 2008 Summer Olympics (in Beijing) and returning to Italy. The trip started on 6 July 2008 and passed through 17 countries to finish on 21 September 2008, and used LPG for fuel for 95% of the journey. The project is described in the 2008 book Aregolavanti (Always Forward).

In winter 2011, together with Emanuele Calchetti, he traveled from Rome to Volgograd with a gas-fuelled Gonow pick-up, crossing Eastern Europe, Moldova, Transnistria, and Ukraine. This experience originated the travel book Via Stalingrado (Stalingrad Street, 2011).

Among his many other car travels, Guerrini reached the extremes of Europe (North Cape, Istanbul, Gibraltar), and completed an expedition to the Caspian Sea through the Caucasian republics in 2010, another travel to Volgograd in December 2013 and January 2014 on an Iveco Daily with a mixed system methane-diesel, the Arezzo-Chernobyl on a methane-propelled Peugeot Expert in the following winter and the Milan-Astana on an LPG Seat Altea in 2016.

In June 2018, he started a new "Turin-Beijing" project on a diesel-methane propelled Toyota Hilux. It is described in the travel book Eurasia.

== Results in the FIA AEC ==
=== Driver ===
Driver results in the FIA AEC
Season	Car	Co-drivers	Starts	Victories	Podiums	Points	Ranking
2009	(Italy) Fiat Marea	(Italy) Andrea Gnaldi Coleschi	1	0	0	5	20th
2010	(France) Citroën C1 (France) Citroën C5	(Italy) Andrea Gnaldi Coleschi (Italy) Emanuele Calchetti	7	0	2	31	5th
2011	(Italy) Alfa Romeo Mito	(Italy) Andrea Gnaldi Coleschi (Italy) Emanuele Calchetti (Italy) Leonardo Burchini	7	0	4	66	2nd
2012	(Italy) Alfa Romeo Mito	(Italy) Emanuele Calchetti (Italy) Leonardo Burchini	8	1	5	74	2nd
2013	(Italy) Alfa Romeo Mito	(Italy) Francesca Olivoni (Italy) Isabelle Barciulli (Italy) Emanuele Calchetti	6	0	4	69	2nd
2014	(Italy) Alfa Romeo Mito	(Italy) Isabelle Barciulli	5	0	4	62	2nd
2016	(Italy) Abarth 500	(Italy) Francesca Olivoni	1	-	-	10	9th
2019	(Germany) Audi e-tron	(Italy) Emanuele Calchetti	12	1	7	95,5	3rd
2020	(Germany) Audi e-tron	(Italy) Francesca Olivoni	2	-	2	45	2nd
2021	(Germany) Volkswagen ID.4 (Germany) Volkswagen ID.3	(Italy) Francesca Olivoni (Poland) Artur Prusak	6	-	2	46,5	5th
2022	(South Korea) Kia eNiro	(Poland) Artur Prusak	7	2	6	105,5	2nd
2023	(South Korea) Kia eNiro	(Poland) Artur Prusak	8	2	4	80	2nd
2024	(South Korea) Kia eNiro	(Poland) Artur Prusak	12	4	9	140,5	2nd
2025	(South Korea) Kia eNiro (China) Nio ET5T	(Poland) Artur Prusak	13	6	12	176,5	1st
2026	(South Korea) Kia eNiro (China) Chery Fulwin A9 (Italy) Lancia Ypsilon	(Poland) Artur Prusak	11	1	5	98	3rd
Total			106	17	66	1104,5	-

=== Co-driver ===
Co-driver results in the FIA AEC
Season	Car	Drivers	Starts	Victories	Podiums	Points	Ranking
2015	(Italy) Abarth 500	(Italy) Nicola Ventura	6	2	5	76	2nd
2016	(France) Renault Zoe	(Italy) Nicola Ventura	3	3	3	30	1st
2017	(Japan) Nissan Leaf (South Korea) Hyundai Ioniq	(Italy) Nicola Ventura (Italy) Vincenzo Di Bella (Poland) Artur Prusak (Bulgaria) Svetoslav Dojčinov	6	3	4	38	1st
2018	(Japan) Nissan Leaf (France) Renault Zoe	(Poland) Artur Prusak	2	-	1	8	3rd
Total			17	8	13	152	-

== Bibliography ==
- (in Italian) Andrea Gnaldi Coleschi, Guido Guerrini, Nicola Dini, Aregovalanti, Città di Castello, 2008, 160 pp.
- (in Italian) Emanuele Calchetti, Guido Guerrini, Via Stalingrado, Petruzzi Editore, Città di Castello, 2011, 216 pp. ISBN 978-88-89797-31-0.
- (in Italian) Guido Guerrini, Eurasia. Dall'Atlantico al Pacifico con il gas naturale, Sansepolcro, 2018. ISBN 978-88-94407-60-0.
