= 2010 FIA Alternative Energies Cup =

Seasons
- ← 2009 2011 →

The 2010 FIA Alternative Energies Cup was a season of the FIA Alternative Energies Cup, a world championship for vehicles with alternative energy propulsion organized by the Fédération Internationale de l'Automobile. The season consisted of ten rallies, beginning with Rally Montecarlo on 25 March, and ended with Ecorally San Marino - Città del Vaticano on 22 October.

France's Raymond Durand won the Drivers championship, his second consecutive title, and Toyota secured their fourth Manufacturers' title.

== Calendar and winners ==
Date	Race	Winner	Regularity	Consumption
March 25, 2010	(Monaco) 4^{e} Rallye Montecarlo	(Spain) Luis Murguia	(Belgium) Raphaël Van der Straeten	(France) Yannick Rondeau
May 5, 2010	(Belgium) Clean Week 2020, Zolder	(France) Raymond Durand	(Belgium) Raphaël Van der Straeten	(France) Raymond Durand
May 29, 2010	(Italy) Aria Nuova, Monza	(Italy) Vincenzo Di Bella	(Italy) Guido Guerrini	(Italy) Pier Luigi Berna
July 17, 2010	(Spain) II Eco Rallye Vasco Navarro, Vitoria-Gasteiz	(Spain) Txema Foronda	(Spain) Jesús Echave	(Spain) Ander Aramburu
August 12, 2010	(Iceland) Rally Reykjavík, Reykjavík	(France) Raymond Durand	(France) Raymond Durand	(France) Raymond Durand
August 28, 2010	(Italy) Daniel Bonara Cup, Franciacorta	(Italy) Vincenzo Di Bella	(Italy) Guido Guerrini	(Italy) Vincenzo Di Bella
September 17, 2010	(Greece) 4th High-Tech Ecomobility Rally, Athens	(Greece) Miltiadis Tsoskounoglou	(Greece) Constantinos Lambouras	(France) Raymond Durand
October 1, 2010	(Canada) Rallye Énergie Alternative, Montreal	(Canada) Max Caron	(Canada) Martyn Ouellet	(Canada) Maxime Dubois
October 9, 2010	(Italy) Green Prix Eco Targa, Palermo	(Italy) Massimo Liverani	(Italy) Marcello De Simone	(Italy) Massimo Liverani
October 22, 2010	5° Ecorally San Marino – Città del Vaticano	(Italy) Massimo Liverani	(San Marino) Stefano Pezzi	(Spain) Jesús Echave

== Driver Standings ==
Points	Driver
64	(France) Raymond Durand
52	(Italy) Vincenzo Di Bella
48	(Spain) Jesús Echave
43	(Italy) Massimo Liverani
31	(Italy) Guido Guerrini
20	(Spain) Txema Foronda, (Greece) Miltiadis Tsoskounoglou
17	(Italy) Massimiliano Sorghi
16	(Iceland) Kristjan Einar
14	(Belgium) Raphael Van Der Straeten
12	(Iceland) Hronn Bjarkar Hardardottir, (Spain) Gaizka Lazarobaster, (Greece) Constantinos Lambouras
10	(Spain) Luis Murguia, (Spain) Maykel Del Cyd, (Iceland) Gunnar Pall Palsson, (Spain) Roberto Uriarte, (Greece) Dimitrios Malathritis, (Italy) Filippo Mulé, (Canada) Max Caron, (San Marino) Stefano Pezzi
8	(Belgium) Pascale De Ravet, (Italy) Marcello De Simone, (Canada) Luck Mervil
6	(Monaco) Bernard Hostein, (Greece) Nikos Pomonis, (Italy) Gianfranco Mavaro
5	(Belgium) Leo Van Hoorick, (Italy) Pierluigi Berna, (Canada) Éric Bernier-Meunier
4	(Belgium) Marc Nelles, (France) Christophe Ponset, (Spain) Adrian Oiarbide, (Greece) Viassios Koutsoukos, (Italy) Salvatore Riolo, (Canada) Martyn Ouellet, (San Marino) Caterina Zonzini
3	(Canada) Maxime Dubois
2	(Belgium) Thyas Genbrugge, (Italy) Mario Montanucci, (Spain) Juan Echaide, (Greece) Manthos Kallios, (Canada) Martin D'Anjou, (Italy) Sonia Ielo
1	(France) Gerard Fourcade, (Italy) Giulio Guerrini, (Italy) Radames Preo, (Canada) Robin Desmeules

== Manufacturer standings ==
Points	Manufacturer (First places)
94	(Japan) Toyota
78	(France) Citroën
59	(Japan) Honda
54	(Italy) Fiat
38	(United States) Ford
