= Fuzzy Kofler =

Italian rally driver

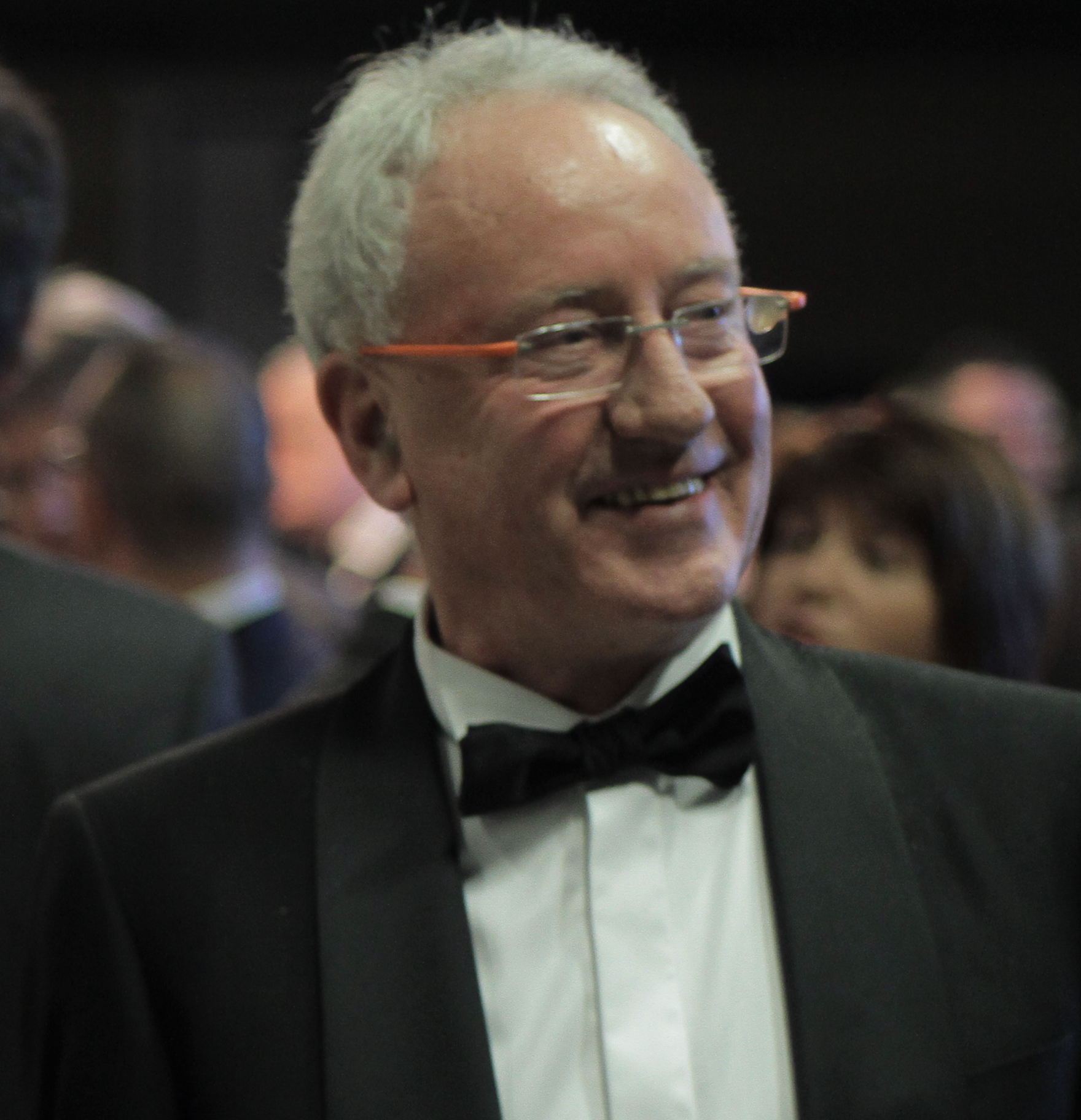
- Nationality: (Italy) Italian
- Born: 6 June 1948 (age 78) Tscherms, Italy

FIA E-Rally Regularity Cup career
- Current team: Audi
- Former teams: Think City, Tesla Motors

Championship titles
- 2014, 2015, 2017, 2019: FIA E-Rally Regularity Cup

Walter "Fuzzy" Kofler (born 6 June 1948) is an Italian rally driver, four-time winner of the FIA E-Rally Regularity Cup.

== Career ==
As a rally driver, in 2012, Kofler began to participate in tenders reserved for electrically powered vehicles thanks to the partnership with the Autotest Motorsport team of Josef Unterholzner.

In the 2014 season he won the FIA Alternative Energies Cup in a Think City, paired with co-driver Franco Gaioni. He repeated this 2015, while in 2017, in a Tesla Model S, he won the world title in the FIA E-Rally Regularity Cup, then also won in 2019 in an Audi e-tron.
