= Artur Prusak =

Polish rally pilot

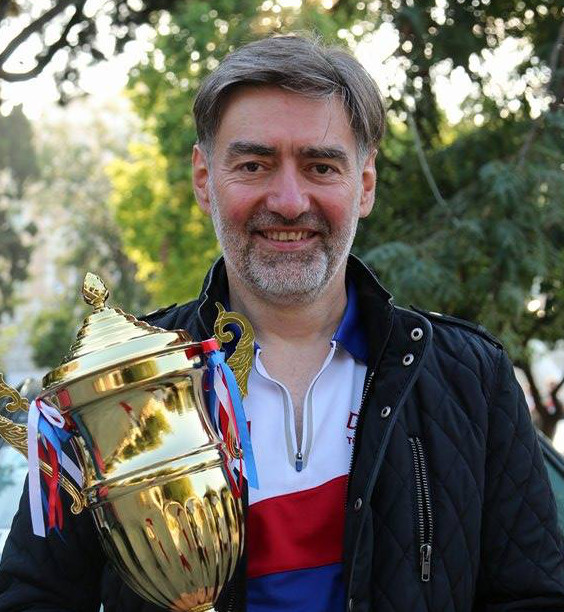
- Nationality: (Poland) Polish

FIA E-Rally Regularity Cup career

Championship titles
- 2015, 2016, 2020: FIA E-Rally Regularity Cup

Artur Prusak is a Polish rally driver currently competing in the FIA E-Rally Regularity Cup where he is a three-time champion, having won it in 2015, 2016 and 2020.

== Biography ==
In 2015, Prusak won the FIA Alternative Energies Cup on a Toyota Prius. During the season, paired with French co-driver Thierry Benchetrit, he finish in first place at the Ecorally San Marino – Città del Vaticano, at the Ecorally della Mendola and at the Hi Tech Ecomobility Rally in Athens and second place at the Eco Snow Trophy in Fiera di Primiero. The following season, Prusak successfully defended his AEC title, and in 2020 he won his third title in the now renamed E-Rally Regularity Cup.
