= Vincenzo Di Bella =

Italian rally driver (born 1977)

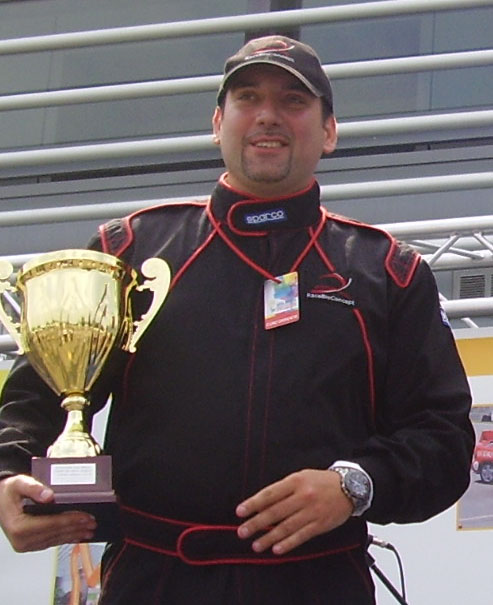
- Vincenzo Di Bella at the Trofeo Aria Nuova, Autodromo Nazionale Monza, 30 May 2010.
- Nationality: (Italy) Italian
- Born: 23 March 1977 (age 49) Milan

FIA Alternative Energies Cup career
- Current team: Citroën

Vincenzo Di Bella (born 23 March 1977) is an Italian rally driver born in Milan. He was the Italian champion in 2010, with his co-driver Christian Collovà, and the FIA Alternative Energies Cup runner-up in 2007, 2008 and 2010.

== See also ==
- FIA Alternative Energies Cup
- Massimo Liverani
- Guido Guerrini (traveler)
- Raymond Durand (driver)
