= Giuliano Mazzoni =

Italian rally driver

- Nationality: (Italy) Italian
- Born: 9 January 1950 (age 76) Forlì

Awards
- 2007, 2008: FIA Alternative Energies Cup

Giuliano Mazzoni (born 9 January 1950) is an Italian rally driver born in Forlì. He won the FIA Alternative Energies Cup drivers' title in 2007 and 2008 with Opel Corsa biodiesel, together with the co-driver Massimo Liverani and finished second in 2009 behind the French Raymond Durand (Toyota Prius).
