= 2008 FIA Alternative Energies Cup =

Season of FIA Alternative Energies Cup

Seasons
- ← 2007 2009 →

The 2008 FIA Alternative Energies Cup was a season of the FIA Alternative Energies Cup, a world championship for vehicles with alternative energy propulsion organized by the Fédération Internationale de l'Automobile. The season consisted of seven rallies, beginning on 30 March, and ended on 12 October.Italy's Giuliano Mazzoni (Opel Corsa) won his second Drivers championship, and Toyota secured their second Manufacturers' title.

== Driver Standings ==
Points	Driver (First places)
42	(Italy) Giuliano Mazzoni
42	(Italy) Vincenzo Di Bella
22	(Italy) Radames Preo
20	(Switzerland) Marco Foletta
