= 2007 FIA Alternative Energies Cup =

Alternative Energies Cup

Seasons
- ← none 2008 →

The 2007 FIA Alternative Energies Cup is the first season of the FIA Alternative Energies Cup, a world championship for vehicles with alternative energy propulsion organized by the Fédération Internationale de l'Automobile. The season consisted of seven rallies, beginning on April 1, and ended on November 11.

Italy's Giuliano Mazzoni won the Drivers championship, and Toyota secured the Manufacturers' title.

== Driver Standings ==
Points	Driver (First places)
70	(Italy) Giuliano Mazzoni
51	(Italy) Vincenzo Di Bella
28	(Italy) Radames Preo
27	(France) Jean-Michel Matas
22	(Italy) Mario Montanucci

== Manufacturer Standings ==
Points	Manufacturer (First places)
78	(Japan) Toyota
53	(Japan) Honda
47	(Germany) Opel
28	(Italy) Fiat
23	(Spain) Seat
