= Juanan Delgado =

Spanish rally co-driver

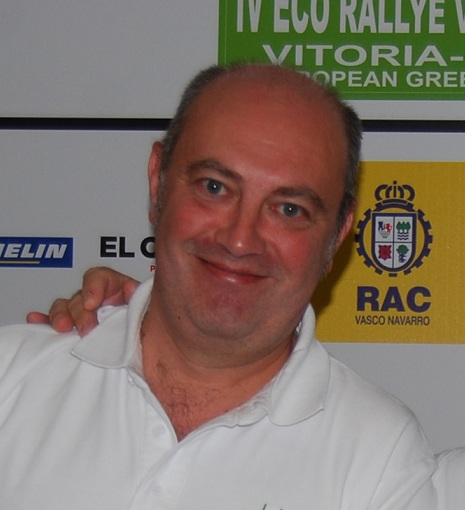
- Juanan Delgado at the Eco Rallye Vasco Navarro Vitoria, Spain, 2 June 2012
- Nationality: (Spain) Spanish
- Born: 26 October 1964 (age 62) Bilbao

FIA Alternative Energies Cup career
- Current team: Nissan

Championship titles
- 2011: FIA Alternative Energies Cup

Juan Antonio Delgado Navarro, better known as Juanan Delgado (born 26 October 1964 in Bilbao, Spain) is a Spanish rally co-driver, in 2011 winner of the FIA Alternative Energies World Cup for co-drivers. He participated in the championship together with Basque driver Jesús Echave (Vitoria, 1954), who concluded fourth in the driver standings.

== Biography ==
Of Basques origin, in 2011 he became world co-driver champion in the FIA ecoRally Cup, competing in the championship alongside Jesús Echave, who finished fourth in the drivers' standings. In 2012 and 2015, he won the co-driver classification in the same competition in the category reserved for purely electric cars.

Previously, he had participated in numerous editions of the Spanish Rally Championship, finishing third overall in 1996.
