= FIA ecoRally Cup =

- Category: Rallying
- Country: International
- Drivers' champion: (San Marino) Guido Guerrini
- Co-Drivers' champion: (France) Artur Prusak
- Makes' champion: (South Korea) Kia Motors

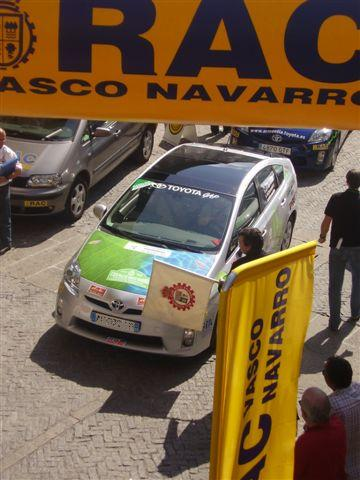
World Champion 2009 and 2010 Raymond Durand starting the Ecorally Vasco-Navarro (Vitoria-Gasteiz, July 16, 2010).

The FIA ecoRally Cup is an international motorsport competition for electric vehicles organized by the Fédération Internationale de l'Automobile. The cup consists of several regularity rallies, usually located in Europe and ran during one calendar year. Vehicles must be unmodified production road vehicles, although prototypes may be permitted subject to FIA approval if they are road legal within the European Union.

The cup replaced a series of FIA competitions based around vehicles developed with alternative energy propulsion and included various energy sources and propulsion methods. It was originally known as Alternative Energies Cup (AEC) until 2016. From 2017 to 2021 it was known as E-Rally Regularity Cup (ERRC), and was part of the FIA Electric and New Energy Championship (ENEC) until 2020 along with the Solar Cup and E-Karting.

== Champions ==
=== FIA ecoRally Cup (2022-) ===
Year	Drivers' champion	Co-Drivers' champion	Makes' champion
2022	(Spain) Eneko Conde	(Spain) Lukas Sergnese	(South Korea) Kia Motors
2023	(Czech Republic) Michal Žďárský	(Czech Republic) Jakub Nábělek	(South Korea) Kia Motors
2024	(Czech Republic) Michal Žďárský	(Czech Republic) Jakub Nábělek	(South Korea) Kia Motors
2025	(San Marino) Guido Guerrini	(Poland) Artur Prusak	(South Korea) Kia Motors
2026	(Czech Republic) Michal Žďárský	(Czech Republic) Jakub Nábělek	(South Korea) Hyundai

=== FIA E-Rally Regularity Cup (2017-2021) ===
Year	Drivers' champion	Co-Drivers' champion	Makes' champion
2017	(Italy) Fuzzy Kofler	(Italy) Guido Guerrini	(United States) Tesla
2018	(France) Didier Malga	(France) Anne-Valérie Bonnel	(France) Renault
2019	(Italy) Fuzzy Kofler	(Italy) Franco Gaioni	(Germany) Audi
2020	(Poland) Artur Prusak	(France) Thierry Benchetrit	(Germany) Opel
2021	(Spain) Eneko Conde	(Spain) Loren Serrano	(South Korea) Kia Motors

==== FIA ERRC Consumption Cup (2019) ====
Year	Drivers' champion	Co-Drivers' champion	Makes' champion
2019	(France) Alexandre Stricher	(France) Thierry Benchetrit	(South Korea) Hyundai

=== FIA Alternative Energies Cup ===
==== Category VII: Hybrid and other vehicles (2007-2016) ====
Year	Drivers' champion	Co-Drivers' champion	Makes' champion
2007	(Italy) Giuliano Mazzoni (Opel)	(Italy) Massimo Liverani (Opel)	(Japan) Toyota
2008	(Italy) Giuliano Mazzoni (Opel)	(Italy) Massimo Liverani (Opel)	(Japan) Toyota
2009	(France) Raymond Durand (Toyota)	(France) Cristian Fine (Toyota)	(Japan) Toyota
2010	(France) Raymond Durand (Toyota)	(France) Cristian Fine (Toyota)	(Japan) Toyota
2011	(Italy) Massimo Liverani (Fiat)	(Spain) Juanan Delgado (Toyota)	(Japan) Toyota
2012	(Italy) Massimo Liverani (Fiat)	(Italy) Emanuele Calchetti (Alfa Romeo)	(Italy) Fiat
2013	(Italy) Massimo Liverani (Abarth)	(Italy) Fulvio Ciervo (Abarth)	(Italy) Abarth
2014	(Italy) Massimo Liverani (Abarth)	(Italy) Isabelle Barciulli (Alfa Romeo)	(Italy) Abarth
2015	(Poland) Artur Prusak (Toyota)	(France) Thierry Benchetrit (Toyota)	(Japan) Toyota
2016	(Poland) Artur Prusak (Toyota)	(France) Thierry Benchetrit (Toyota)	(Japan) Toyota

==== FIA AEC – Category III: Pure electric vehicles (2007-2016) ====
Year	Drivers' champion	Co-drivers' champion	Makes' champion
2010	(Italy) Claudio Cicero	---	(Italy) Micro-Vett
2011	(Spain) Antonio Zanini Sans	(Spain) Eduardo Ansotegui	(Japan) Mitsubishi
2012	(Spain) Jesús Echave	(Spain) Juanan Delgado	(Japan) Mitsubishi
2013	(France) James Morlaix	(France) Daniel Collet	(United States) Tesla Motors
2014	(Italy) Fuzzy Kofler	(Italy) Franco Gaioni	(Norway) Think City
2015	(Italy) Fuzzy Kofler	(Spain) Juanan Delgado	(France) Renault
2016	(Italy) Nicola Ventura	(Italy) Guido Guerrini	(France) Renault

==== Category I: Solar powered vehicles and Olympia Class ====
Year	Solar powered vehicles	Olympia Class
2013	Osaka Sangyo University	Ashiya University Solar Car Project B
2014	Osaka Sangyo University	Ashiya University Solar Car Project B
2015	Osaka Sangyo University	Team Redzone
2016	Osaka Sangyo University	Team Redzone
2017	Osaka Sangyo University	Team Redzone
2018	Team Redzone	Nitech Solar Racing
