= Massimo Liverani =

Italian rally driver and co-driver (born 1961)

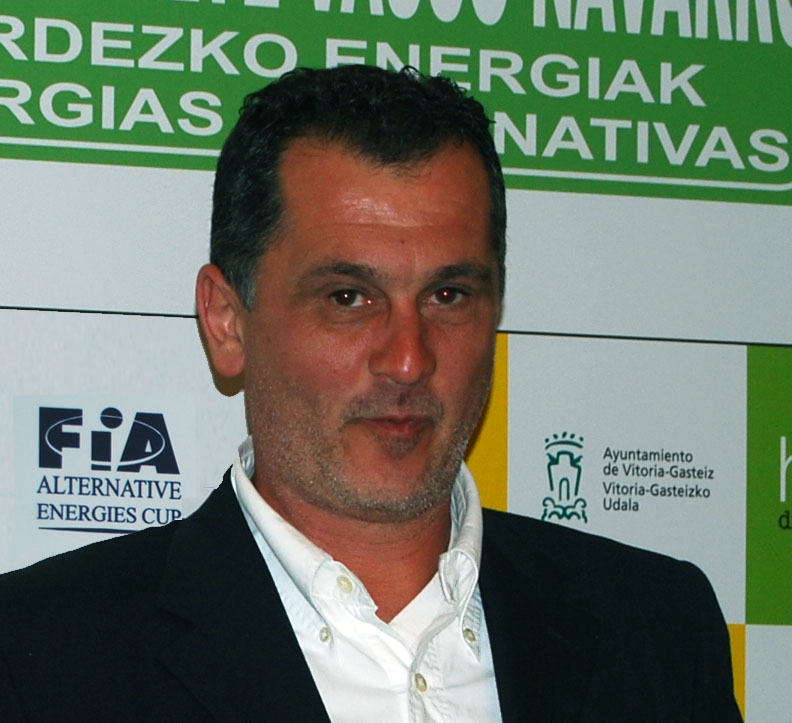
- Massimo Liverani at the 3rd Eco Rallye Vasco Navarro in Vitoria, Spain, 27 August 2011.
- Nationality: (Italy) Italian
- Born: 19 September 1961 (age 65) Rocca San Casciano, Italy

FIA Alternative Energies Cup career
- Current team: Abarth
- Former teams: Fiat

Championship titles
- 2011, 2012, 2013, 2014: FIA Alternative Energies Cup

Massimo Liverani (born 19 September 1961) is an Italian rally driver and co-driver born in Rocca San Casciano. As a driver, he won the FIA Alternative Energies Cup in 2011, 2012, 2013 and 2014. As a co-driver he won the World Championship in 2007 and 2008 with Giuliano Mazzoni.

== See also ==
- Raymond Durand (driver)
- Guido Guerrini (traveler)
