= Raymond Durand (rally driver) =

French rally driver

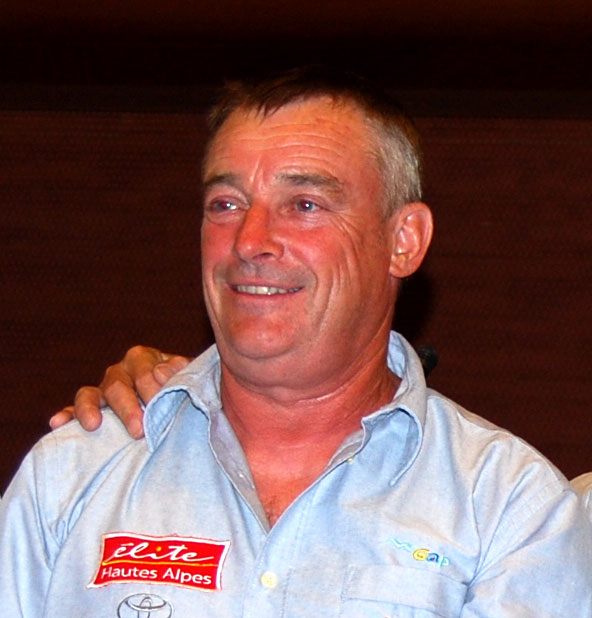
- Raymond Durand at the 4th High-Tech Ecomobility Rally in Loutraki, Greece, 19 September 2010.
- Nationality: (France) French
- Born: 8 July 1952 (age 74) Gap, France

FIA Alternative Energies Cup career
- Current team: Toyota

Awards
- 2009, 2010: FIA Alternative Energies Cup

Raymond Durand (born 8 July 1952 in Gap, Hautes-Alpes) is a French rally driver. He won the FIA Alternative Energies Cup drivers' title with Toyota in 2009 (finishing first in the Rally of Montecarlo and in the Ecorally San Marino – Città del Vaticano) and in 2010 (when he won in Zolder and Reykjavík).

== See also ==
- FIA Alternative Energies Cup
- Massimo Liverani
- Guido Guerrini (traveler)
