= Think City =

Compact electric hatchback

Th!nk City
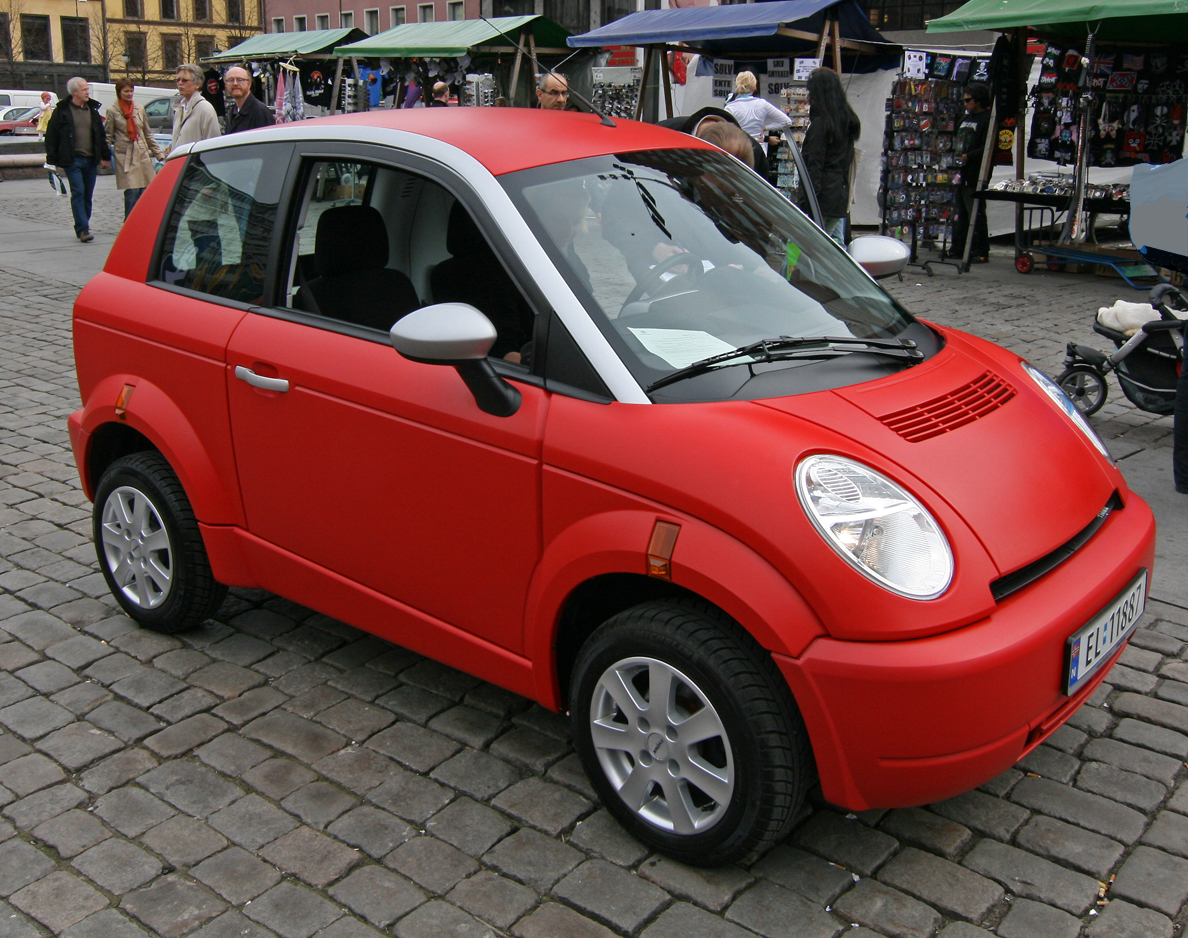

Overview
- Manufacturer: Think Global
- Production: 2001–2002 (trials); 2008 – March 2011 (Europe); November 2010 – August 2012 (US)

Body and chassis
- Layout: Front-engine, front-wheel-drive

The Think City (stylized as the TH!NK City) is an electric city car that was produced by Norwegian carmaker Think Global, and production partner Valmet Automotive from 2008 to 2012. It is a small two-seater/2+2-seater highway capable vehicle, with a top speed of 110 kilometres per hour (68 mph), and an all-electric range of 160 kilometres (99 mi) on a full charge.

As of early 2011, the Th!nk was one of only five crash-tested, mass-produced, and highway-certified electric cars in the world, together with the Tesla Roadster (2008), the Mitsubishi i-MiEV, the Nissan Leaf and the Smart ED. The Th!nk City was sold in Norway, the Netherlands, Spain, France, Austria, Switzerland, Finland, the United Kingdom and the United States. As of October 2010, a total of 2,500 units had been manufactured at Oslo-based TH!NK's production facility. Norway was the leading market with 1,120 units registered through September 2013.

Due to financial difficulties, production of the Th!nk City in Finland was stopped in March 2011, and the company filed for bankruptcy on June 22, 2011, for the fourth time in 20 years. Think Global was purchased soon after by Electric Mobility Solutions AS, which announced production to resume in early 2012 with a refined Think City. However, production never resumed, and the Indiana plant completed its final car in August 2012.

== History ==
The vehicle was known as the Pivco PIV4 in its prototype phase. Ford bought the Norwegian company in 1999 in anticipation of the incoming California Air Resources Board zero emissions vehicle mandate. After the laws partially wound back and made less stringent, Ford ceased production of the vehicle in 2002 with 1,005 units produced. Ford sold the Norwegian electric car company the following year.

The Th!nk City was exhibited for the first time in the UK in July 2008. At the 2008 Geneva Motor Show, Think announced that the Th!nk City would be launched in Denmark and Sweden in 2008, followed by launching in the UK, Germany, Italy and the Netherlands in 2009.

At the 2008 British International Motor Show at the ExCeL Exhibition Centre, London, THINK announced that the Th!nk City will be available to UK customers from the summer of 2009. Prime Minister Gordon Brown joined Transport Minister Geoff Hoon for a presentation by managing director of Think UK.

== First generation (2000) ==
First generation
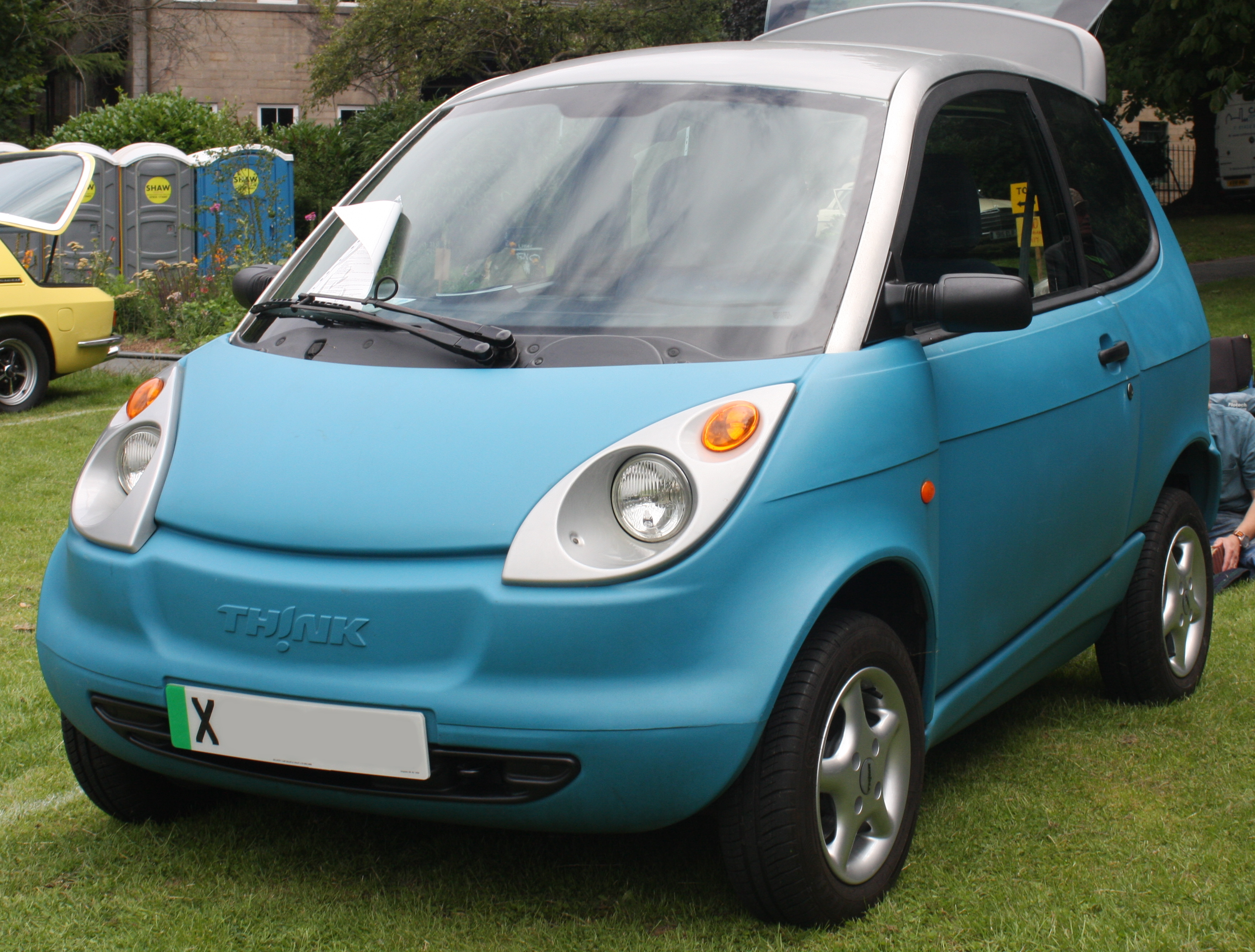

Overview
- Manufacturer: Ford TH!NK
- Production: 2000–2002 (370 produced)
- Assembly: Aurskog, Norway

Body and chassis
- Layout: Front-engine, front-wheel-drive

Powertrain
- Electric motor: 27 kW (36 hp) 3-phase induction motor
- Battery: 12 kWh nickel-cadmium battery (NiCd)
- Range: 30 mi (48.3 km)

Dimensions
- Wheelbase: 1,976 mm (77.8 in)
- Length: 2,991 mm (117.8 in)
- Width: 1,604 mm (63.1 in)
- Height: 1,563 mm (61.5 in)
- Curb weight: 940 kg (2,070 lb)

The original Think City was produced by the Ford Motor Company's Norwegian subsidiary TH!NK from 2000 until 2002. It was leased in limited numbers in Europe and the United States.

More than 370 vehicles were delivered to customers in North America. They were largely leased to individuals and companies as part of station car trials in California and New York. NHTSA regulations stipulated that these vehicles could not legally remain in the United States beyond the three-year time frame for these trials. Around half of the North American units were scrapped while the other half were exported back to Norway as used cars.

== Second generation (2008) ==
Second generation
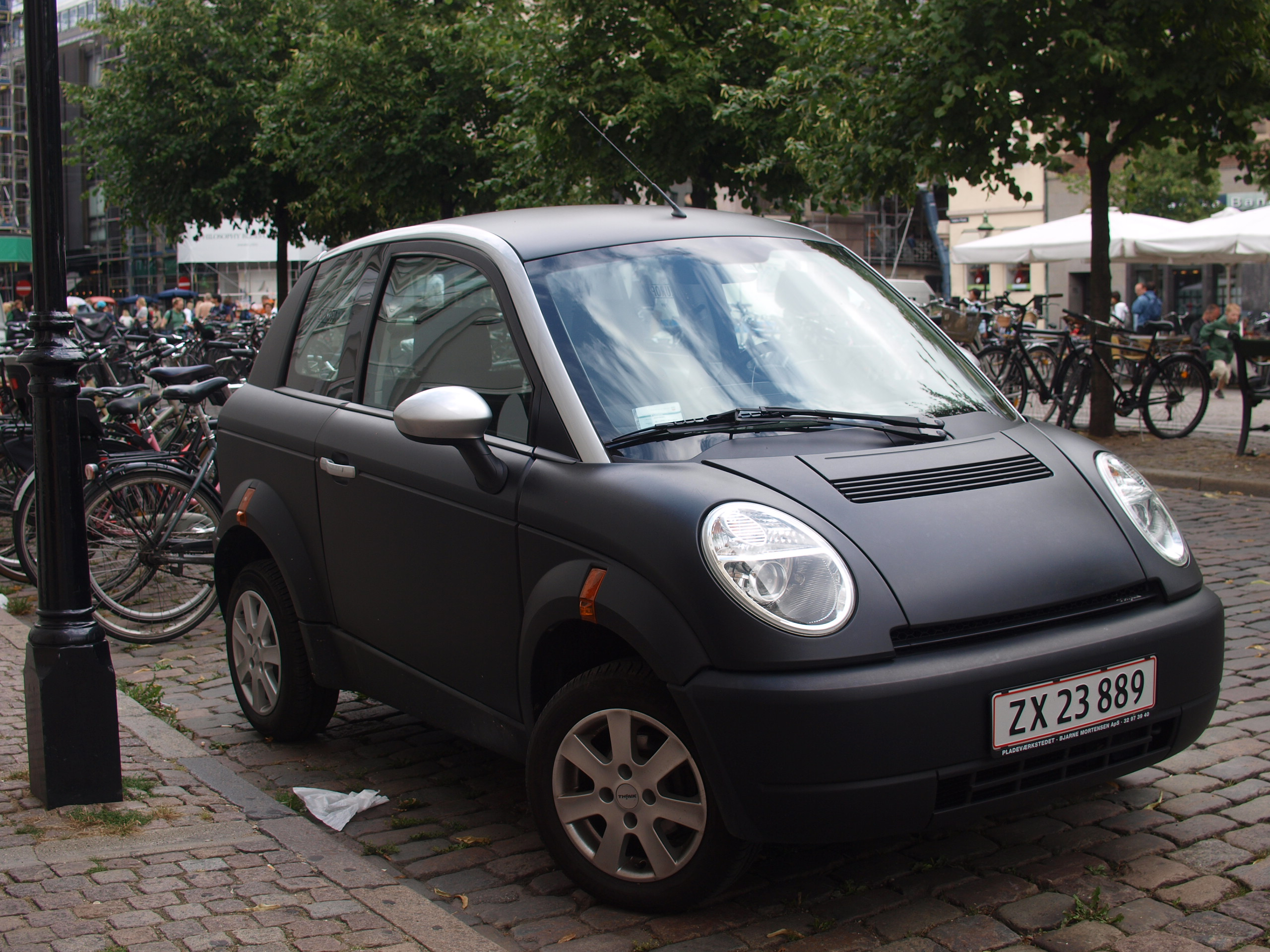
- A Th!nk City in Denmark

Overview
- Manufacturer: Think Global
- Production: 2008 – March 2011 (Europe); November 2010 – August 2012 (US) (2,500 produced)
- Assembly: Aurskog, Norway; Uusikaupunki, Finland (Valmet Automotive); Elkhart, Indiana, United States

Body and chassis
- Layout: Front-engine, front-wheel-drive

Powertrain
- Electric motor: 34 kW (46 hp) 3-phase induction motor
- Battery: 24 kWh zebra battery (NaAlCl_{4}), 23 kWh EnerDel Li-ion battery, 18.7 kWh A123 Li-ion battery
- Range: 160 km (99.4 mi)

Dimensions
- Wheelbase: 1,970 mm (77.6 in)
- Length: 3,143 mm (123.7 in)
- Width: 1,658 mm (65.3 in)
- Height: 1,596 mm (62.8 in)
- Curb weight: 1,038 kg (2,288 lb)

=== Production ===
Think Global originally planned to start deliveries to Norwegian customers in the last quarter of 2007. That target was missed, but as of August 2008 some 100 electric cars had been manufactured for customers in Norway. On December 15, 2008, the carmaker suspended all vehicle production and laid off 50% of its staff pending negotiation of up to US$29 million in funding for working capital, citing "urgent financial distress." Production of the Th!nk City restarted on December 10, 2009, at Valmet Automotive in Uusikaupunki, Finland. In October 2010 production had reached 2,500 units, making the Th!nk City one of the world's best selling pure electric cars.

On November 24, 2010, Think North America began manufacturing in the Magnum Drive plant located in Elkhart, Indiana. Initially the Finland plant manufactures the body and wheels on the chassis, then ships them to the United States. The lithium-ion battery, made by EnerDel in Indianapolis, the motor and gearbox, seats, headlights and other components are assembled in the Elkhart plant. Each car takes about a week to complete.

Due to financial difficulties, production of the Th!nk City in Finland was stopped in March 2011, and the company filed for bankruptcy in Norway on June 22, 2011, for the fourth time in 20 years. Although Think North America is a separate entity, its future also is in doubt because it is financially supported by the headquarters in Norway. Production in the Elkhart plant was halted a few days before the bankruptcy filing due to delays in the delivery of parts required to assemble the electric cars.

Think Global's assets were bought by Electric Mobility Solutions AS in July 2011, including shares of wholly owned subsidiaries THINK North America and THINK UK. The new owners announced that production is scheduled to restart in early 2012 with a refined Think City.

=== Specifications ===
The car has a 24 kWh traction battery and inbuilt charger, and will re-charge from a standard 230 volt, 10 or 16 amp supply in 9.5–10 hours.

- Motor: 3-phase electric induction motor. It is capable of delivering 34 kW (46 hp) and 66 lb⋅ft (89 N⋅m) of torque.
- Gear box: Fixed reduction gear, permanently connected to drive wheels. Ratio 1:10,15.
- Front disc brakes and rear drum brakes. ABS Power brakes with electric pump w/ regenerative braking.
- Steering Type: Electrohydraulic power steering with fluid reservoir in motor compartment. Steering rack with power steering. Turning diameter: 29.5 ft.
- Curb weight: 1,065 kg (2,348 lb); load capacity with passengers: 202 kg (445 lb); Total weight 1,307 kg (2,881 lb)

=== Sales and price ===
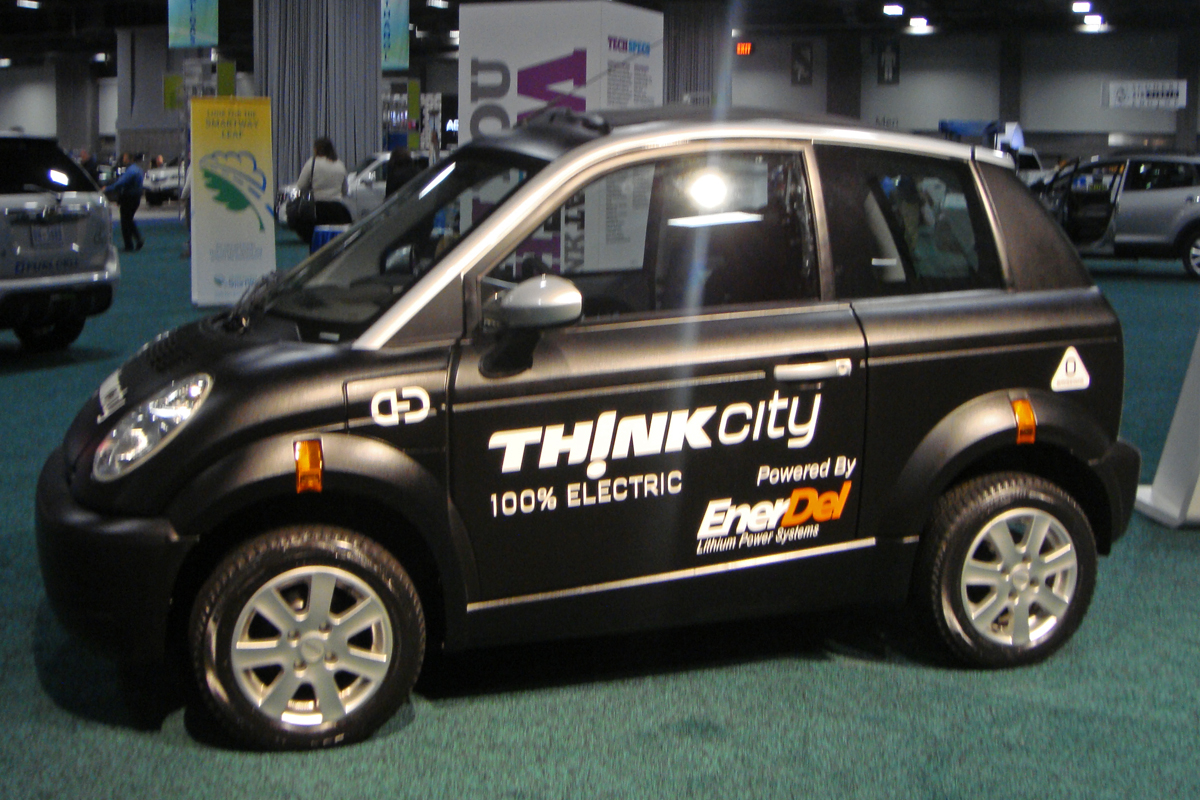
Th!nk City exhibited at the 2010 Washington Auto Show.

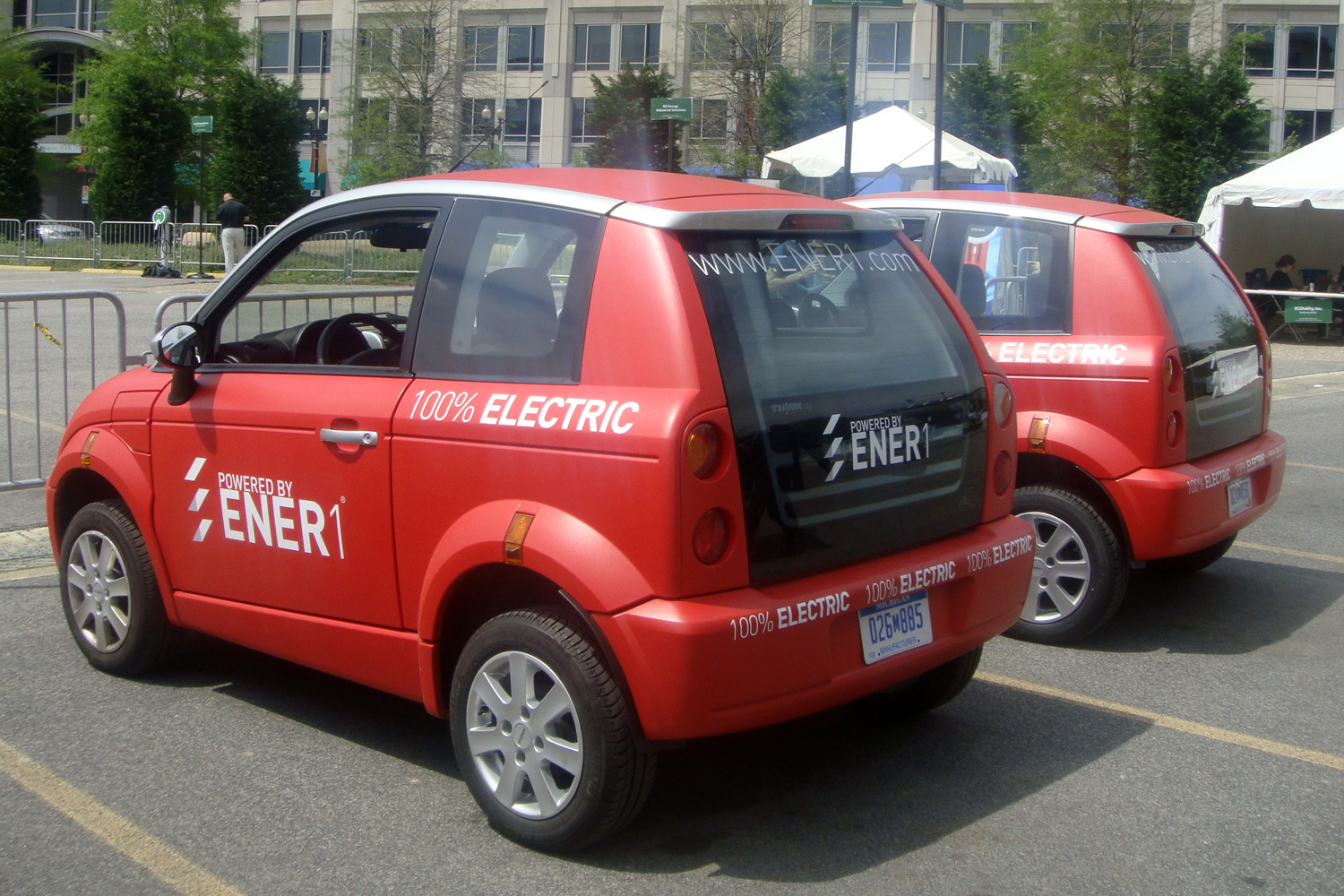
Th!nk City electric cars at a test drive event in Washington, D.C.

==== Europe ====
As of September 2010, the Th!nk City was on sale in Norway, the Netherlands, Spain, France, Austria, Switzerland and Finland.

Norway

The list price for the car in Norway was 244,000 kr before optional features, which is approximately US$38,000, or £25,400, or €30,700. During 2011 a total of 133 units were sold in Norway. As of 30 September 2013, Th!nk City/PIV 4 registrations totaled 1,120 units.

Finland

The list price for the car in Finland was €49,600.

France

During 2010, a total of 11 units were registered in France. A total of 110 units were sold in 2011.

==== United States ====
The Th!nk City retail price was US$36,495 before any applicable federal and local incentives. However, due to the higher cost of low production, Think USA announced that the price of the first 100 units was US$41,695 before any incentives. The first 100 Th!nks were delivered in late 2010 mostly to fleet customers in Indiana. Sales to the general public were expected to begin by mid-2011. Think North America issued three recalls on the first cars produced at the Elkhart plant for defects to its gear shift levers, seat belts and defrosting systems.

The company expected to sell 2,000 to 3,000 cars in 2011 via three to five branded stores in five markets: Southern California, the San Francisco Bay Area, New York City, Washington, D.C. and Indianapolis, and planned to market the electric car as an urban city car.

Following the bankruptcy of Think Global, the remaining 150 Th!nk cars in stock in the U.S. were put on nationwide sale at a discounted price of US$22,500 before any federal and local incentives.

== See also ==
- Government incentives for plug-in electric vehicles
- List of electric cars currently available
- List of modern production plug-in electric vehicles
- List of production battery electric vehicles
- Zero-emissions vehicle
- Think Global
