= EcoRally Cup China =

Motor sport event in China

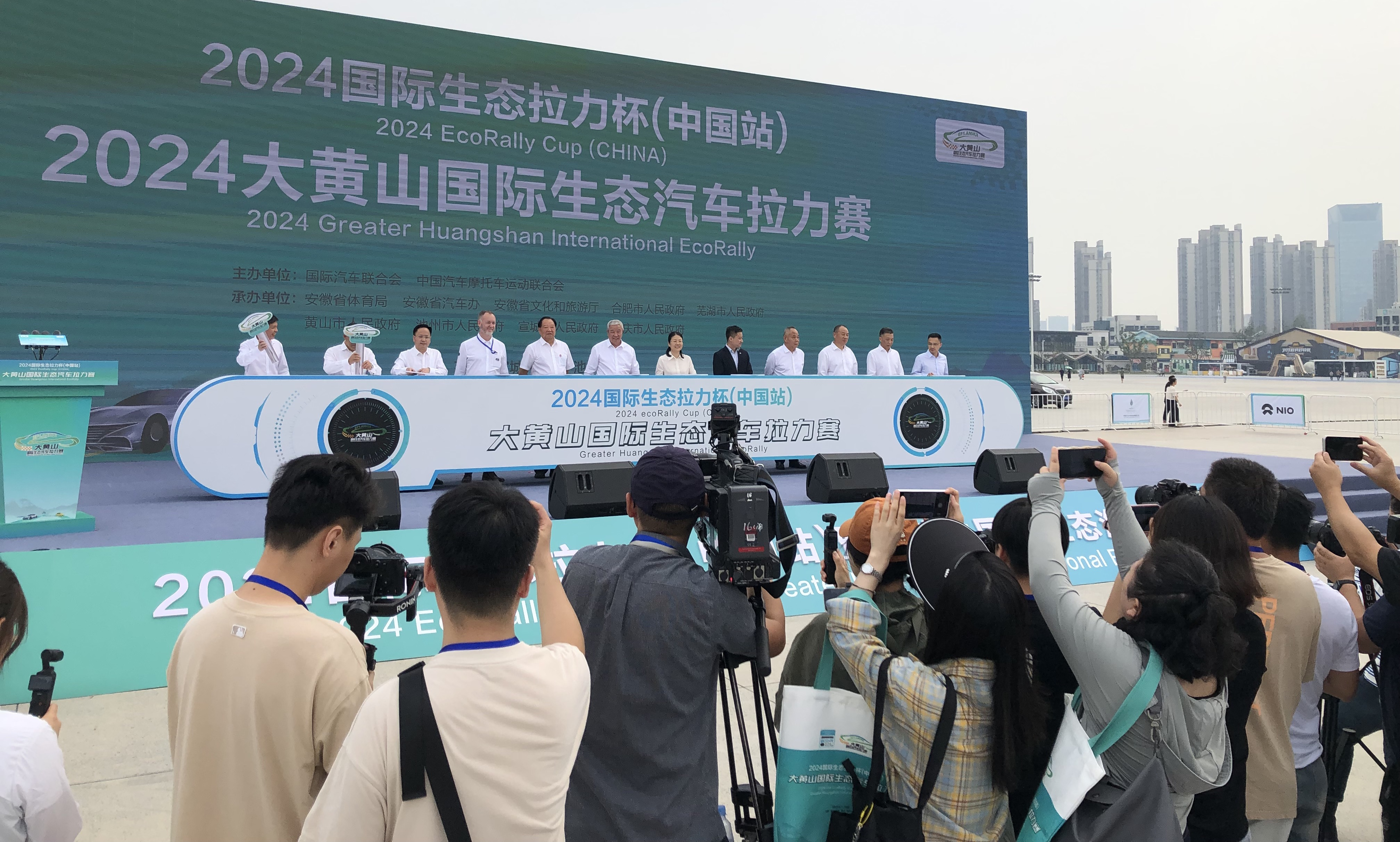
2024 EcoRally Cup China opening ceremony in Hefei

EcoRally Cup China (Chinese: 国际生态拉力杯中国站) is the main rally championship for new energy vehicles which takes place in China. It is organized since 2024 by the International Automobile Federation (FIA) and the Federation of Automobile and Motorcycle Sports of China (CAMF).

The first edition coincided with the Greater Huangshan International Ecorally, held in the Anhui province from September 25 to 30, 2024. Starting and arriving in the city of Hefei, it consisted in five stages which also touched the cities of Wuhu, Xuancheng, Huangshan, Chizhou and Anqing.

In 2025 the Greater Huangshang International Ecorally became part of the FIA ecoRally Cup calendar.

== 2024 results ==
40 international and Chinese crews took part in the event. The first three of the five stages were won by the Italian crew composed of Guido Guerrini and Emanuele Calchetti (Nio ET5), the others by the Chinese Rui Chen-Linghang Chen (Volkswagen Id.Unyx) and the Spanish Shirley Fernández Bellas-Antonio Fernández Basanta (Chery iCar 03).

Guerrini and Calchetti won the general regularity ranking ahead of Portuguese Nuno Serrano-Alexandre Berardo (Chery Exeed Start) and Czech Michal Žďárský-Milan Bydžovský (Chery Century ET). The consumption ranking was won by Chinese Silong Dai and Heng Cui (Geely Geometry G6) ahead of Guerrini-Calchetti and Zixuan Xu-Jingdi Tan (China, Nio ET5).

The final championship ranking saw the success of Guerrini and Calchetti ahead of Žďárský-Bydžovský and Serrano-Berardo, than Eduardo Carpintero-José Figueiredo (Portugal, Chery iCar 03), Fernández Bellas-Fernández Basanta, Heine-Piette (Belgium, Volkswagen Id.Unyx), Špacapan-Kobal (Slovenia, Chery Century ES), Dedikov-Dedikova (Bulgaria, JAC Yiwei 3). Team champion was Volkswagen.

Olympic champion Deng Linlin took part to the rally as a driver, while gold medalists Xu Haifeng and Meng Suping attended as special guests.

=== Events ===
Event	Winners	2nd place	3rd place
Hefei-Wuhu	(Italy) Guido Guerrini (Italy) Emanuele Calchetti	(Portugal) Eduardo Carpinteiro (Portugal) José Figueiredo	(Portugal) Nuno Serrano (Portugal) Alexandre Berardo
Hefei-Wuhu	(China) Nio ET5	(China) Chery iCar 03	(China) Chery ES
Wuhu-Xuancheng-Huangshan	(Italy) Guido Guerrini (Italy) Emanuele Calchetti	(Portugal) Nuno Serrano (Portugal) Alexandre Berardo	(Spain) Shirley Fernández Bellas (Spain) Antonio Fernández Basanta
Wuhu-Xuancheng-Huangshan	(China) Nio ET5	(China) Chery ES	(China) Chery iCar 03
Huangshan-Chizhou	(Italy) Guido Guerrini (Italy) Emanuele Calchetti	(Belgium) Bernand Heine (Belgium) Valérie Piette	(Spain) Shirley Fernández Bellas (Spain) Antonio Fernández Basanta
Huangshan-Chizhou	(China) Nio ET5	(Germany) Volkswagen Id.Unyx	(China) Chery iCar 03
Chizhou-Anqing	(China) Rui Chen (China) Linghang Chen	(Portugal) Nuno Serrano (Portugal) Alexandre Berardo	(Czech Republic) Michal Žďárský (Czech Republic) Milan Bydžovský
Chizhou-Anqing	(Germany) Volkswagen Id.Unyx	(China) Chery ES	(China) Chery ET
Anqing-Hefei	(Spain) Shirley Fernández Bellas (Spain) Antonio Fernández Basanta	(Czech Republic) Michal Žďárský (Czech Republic) Milan Bydžovský	(Portugal) Eduardo Carpinteiro (Portugal) José Figueiredo
Anqing-Hefei	(China) Chery iCar 03	(China) Chery ET	(China) Chery iCar 03

=== Regularity ranking ===
Position	Crew	Car	Total
1	(Italy) Guido Guerrini (Italy) Emanuele Calchetti	Nio ET5	387
2	(Portugal) Nuno Serrano (Portugal) Alexandre Berardo	Chery ET	453
3	(Czech Republic) Michal Žďárský (Czech Republic) Milan Bydžovský	Chery ET	460
4	(Portugal) Eduardo Carpinteiro (Portugal) José Figueiredo	Chery iCar 03	464
5	(Spain) Shirley Fernández Bellas (Spain) Antonio Fernández Basanta	Chery iCar 03	611
6	(Belgium) Bernand Heine (Belgium) Valérie Piette	Volkswagen Id.Unyx	613
7	(Slovenia) Franko Špacapan (Slovenia) Sebastjan Kobal	Chery ES	753
8	(Bulgaria) Kalin Dedikov (Bulgaria) Antoaneta Dedikova	JAC Yiwei 3	2753
9	(China) Yiyu Lv (China) Jingxi Lv	Chery ES	3529
10	(China) Zixuan Xu (China) Jingdi Tan	Nio ET5	5506

=== Energy Performance Index ranking ===
Position	Crew	Car	Index
1	(China) Silong Dai (China) Heng Cui	Geely Geometry 6	0.6388
2	(Italy) Guido Guerrini (Italy) Emanuele Calchetti	Nio ET5	0.6844
3	(China) Zixuan Xu (China) Jingdi Tan	Nio ET5	0.7252
4	(China) Kai Liu (China) Zeliang Liu	Nio ET7	0.7402
5	(China) Yue Wu (China) Junje Li	Volkswagen Id.Unyx	0.7554
6	(China) Jun Chen (China) Jajun Wang	Geely Geometry	0.7631
7	(China) Rui Chen (China) Linghang Chen	Volkswagen Id.Unyx	0.7758
8	(Bulgaria) Kalin Dedikov (Bulgaria) Antoaneta Dedikova	JAC Yiwei 3	0.7863
9	(China) Jian Gao (China) Xing Dong Ren	Leapmotor C10	0.7913
10	(China) Jie Huang (China) Peng Chen	Volkswagen Id.Unyx	0.8166

=== Final combined classification ===
Position	Crew	Car	Points
1	(Italy) Guido Guerrini (Italy) Emanuele Calchetti	Nio ET5	264.8628
2	(Czech Republic) Michal Žďárský (Czech Republic) Milan Bydžovský	Chery ET	422.5560
3	(Portugal) Nuno Serrano (Portugal) Alexandre Berardo	Chery ET	473.7021
4	(Portugal) Eduardo Carpinteiro (Portugal) José Figueiredo	Chery iCar 03	490.8192
5	(Spain) Shirley Fernández Bellas (Spain) Antonio Fernández Basanta	Chery iCar 03	623.2200
6	(Belgium) Bernand Heine (Belgium) Valérie Piette	Volkswagen Id.Unyx	650.7608
7	(Slovenia) Franko Špacapan (Slovenia) Sebastjan Kobal	Chery ES	1200.2067
8	(Bulgaria) Kalin Dedikov (Bulgaria) Antoaneta Dedikova	JAC Yiwei 3	2164.6839
9	(China) Zixuan Xu (China) Jingdi Tan	Nio ET5	3992.9512
10	(China) Yiyu Lv (China) Jingxi Lv	Chery ES	5624.8731
