= Development mule =

Prototype vehicle for testing

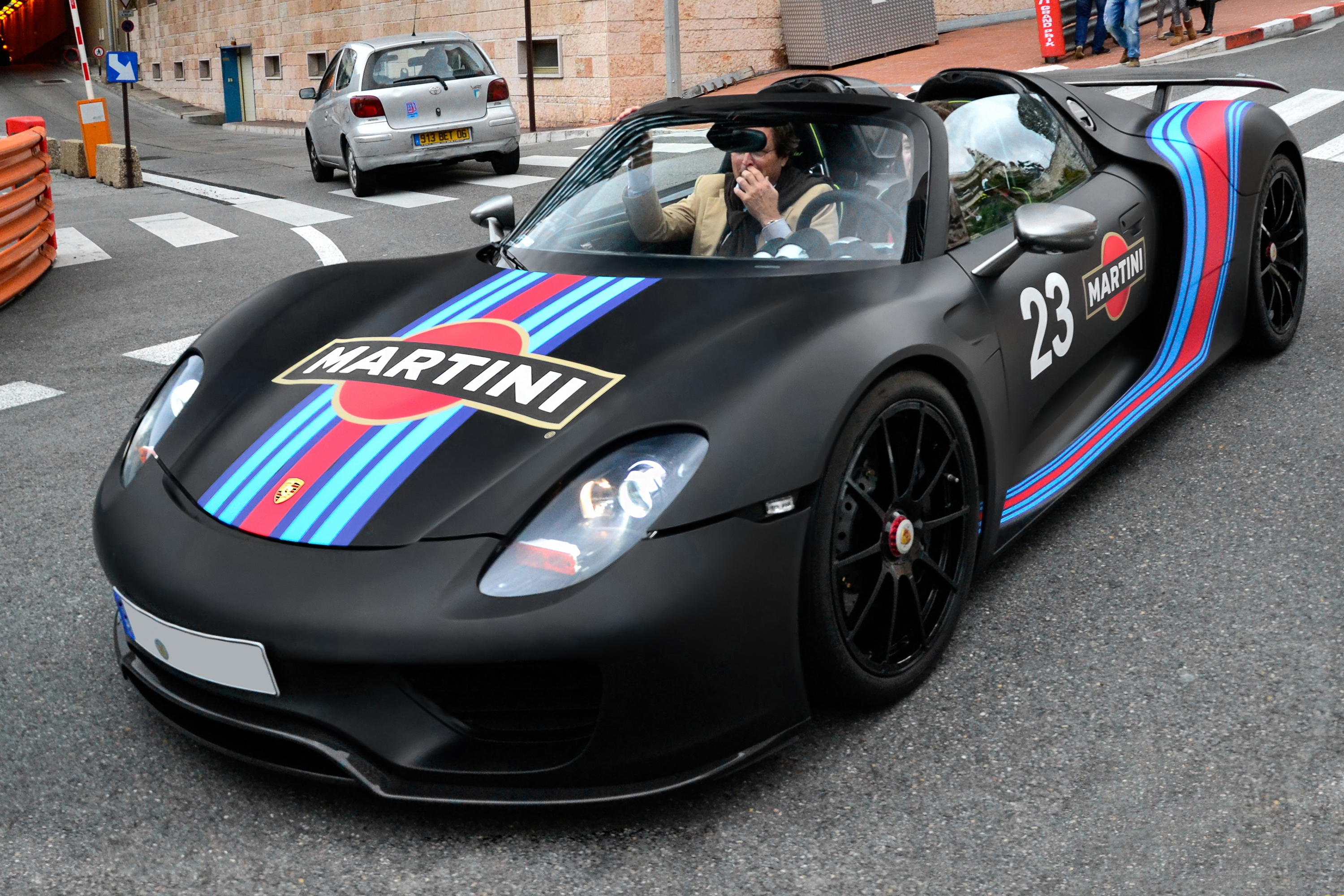
Porsche 918 Spyder development mule in Monaco (2013)

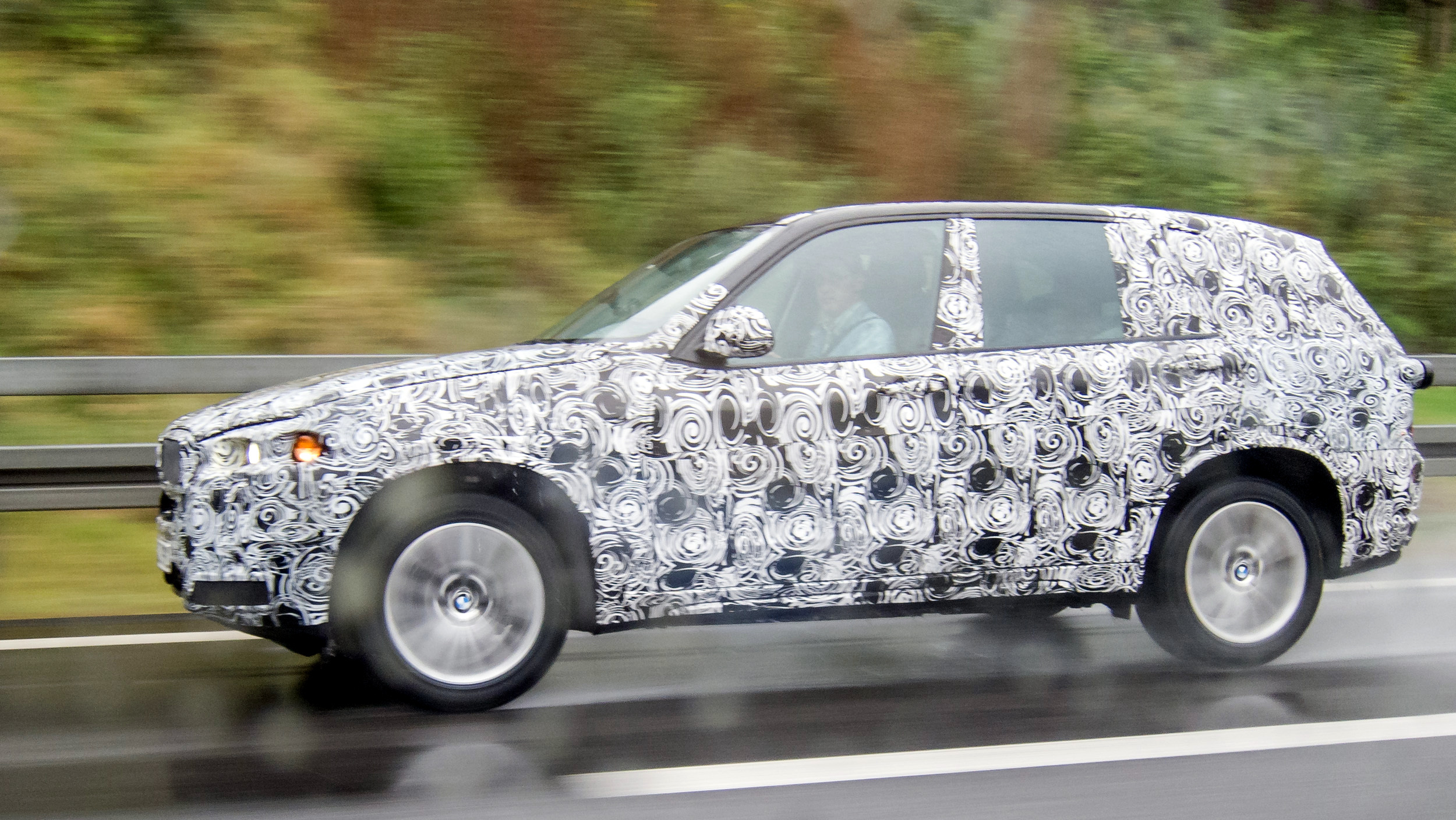
A camouflaged pre-production BMW X5 mule near Munich, Germany (2013)

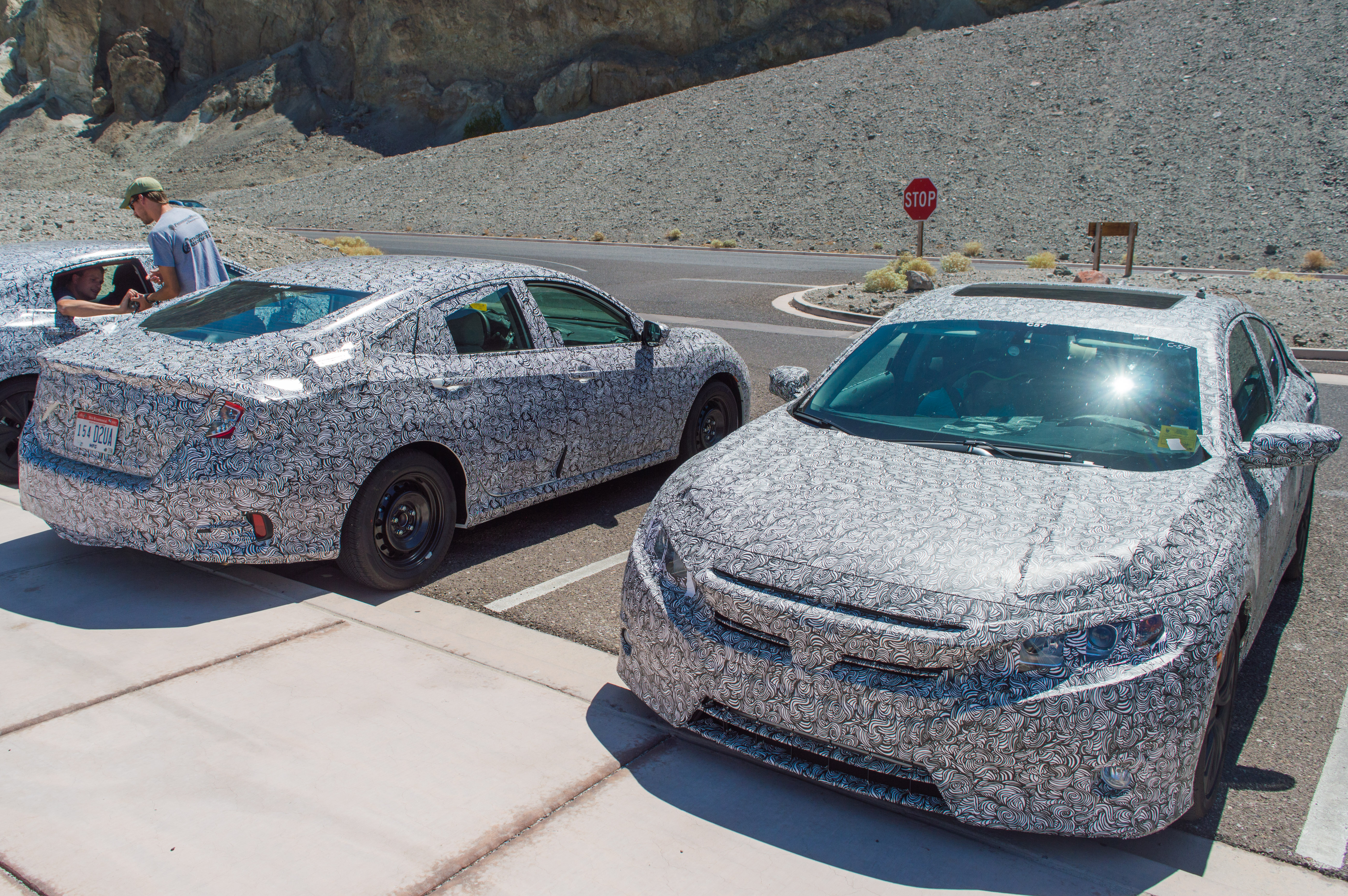
Honda Civic mules at Death Valley's Badwater Basin in the United States (2015)

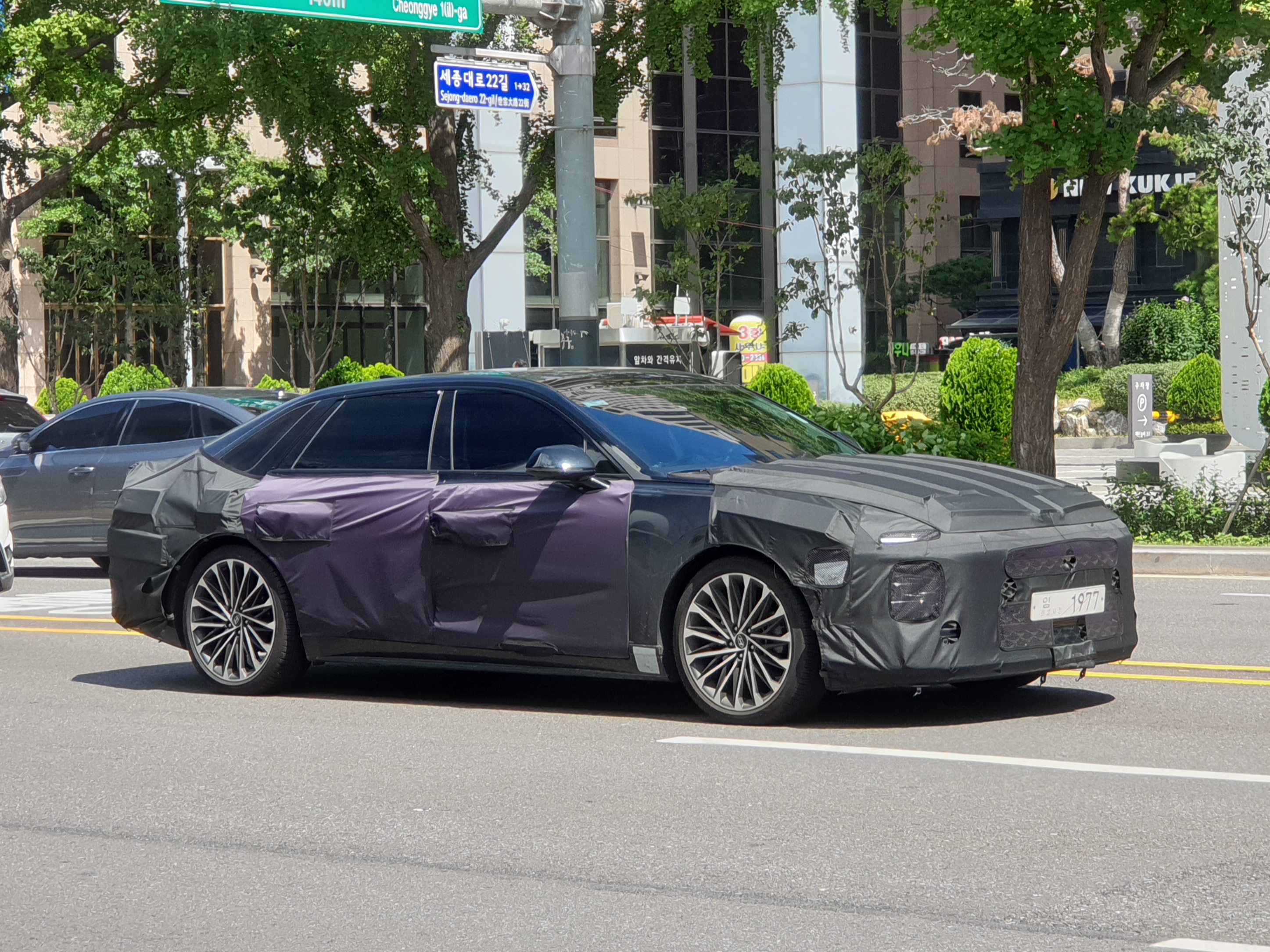
Hyundai Grandeur mule in South Korea (2022)

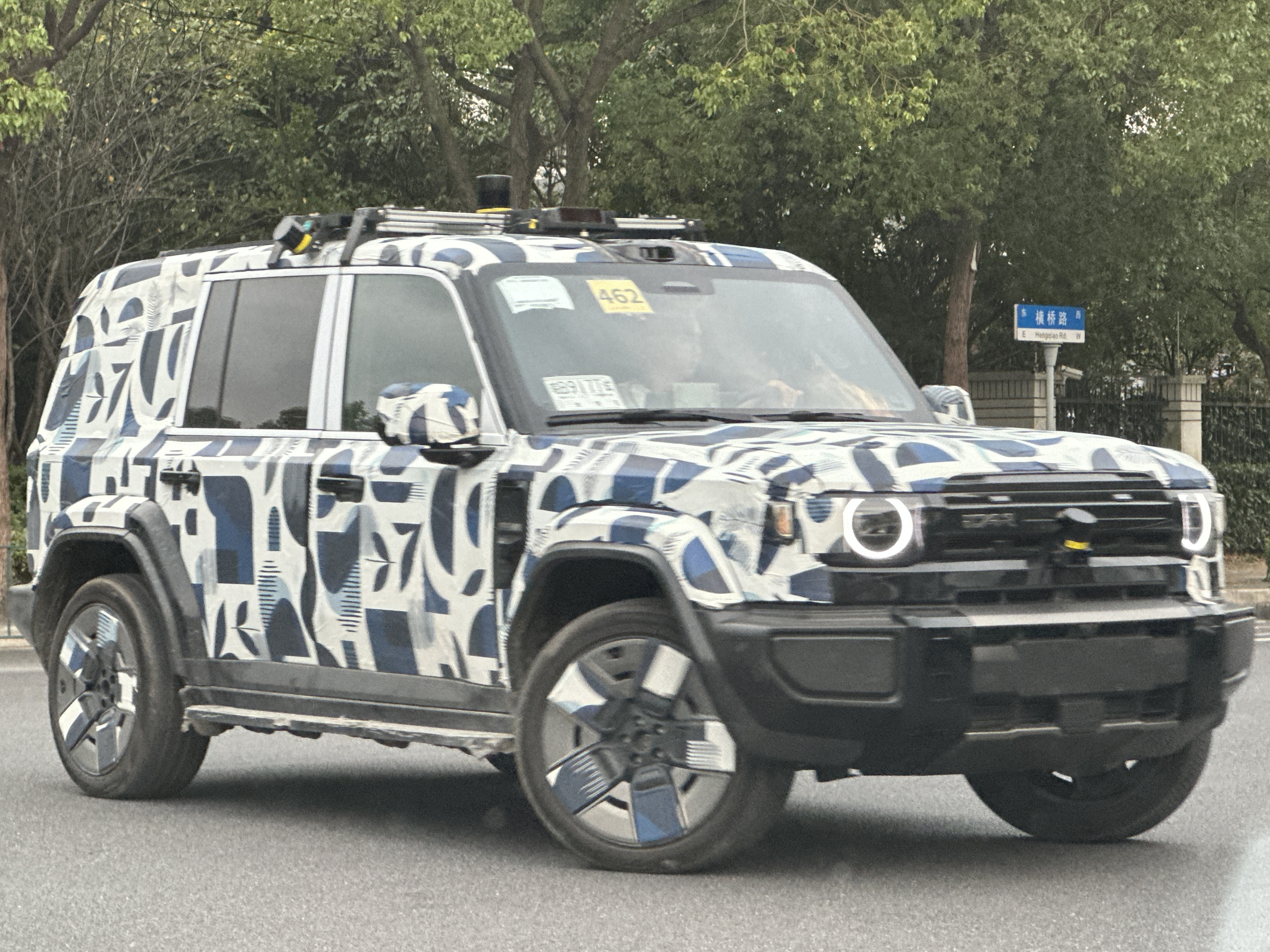
iCar V27 mule in China (2025)

A development mule, also known as test mule or simply mule, in the automotive industry is a testbed vehicle equipped with prototype components requiring evaluation. They are often camouflaged to cover their designs.

== Application ==
Mules are necessary because automakers must assess new aspects of vehicles for both strengths and weaknesses before production. Mules are drivable, sometimes pre-production vehicles often years away from realization and coming after a concept car that preceded the design of critical mechanical components. A mule or engineering development is not the same as a preproduction car because changes are made constantly as the vehicle goes through the engineering development process.

Some mules are built to function as test beds for entry into new market segments such as the mid-engined test mules developed in Italy and Germany for American Motors Corporation (AMC). Surviving examples of these mules are unique. Manufacturers also explore different solutions such as developing an "Urban Concept" car where not only a rotary engine and front-wheel-drive were considered for a small car, but "the first mule was made by cutting down a Matador by 30 in (762 mm) in front and back." Mules using modified existing cars may also be used as a development tool to simulate battery-powered vehicles by incorporating their weight, mass distribution, and suspension to evaluate ride and handling.

Mules may also have advanced chassis and powertrain designs from a prospective vehicle that need testing, which can be effectively concealed in the body and interior of a similarly sized production model. In some cases, a completely unrelated vehicle is adapted to hide the powertrain and other mechanicals being tested. For instance, when the Jaguar XJ220 was under development, a Transit van was modified with a mid-mounted Jaguar XJ220 engine and it had candy wrappers and tabloids on the dashboard to make it look like a regular work vehicle.

If no comparable vehicle is available in-house or an external benchmark is being used mules may be based on another manufacturer's model. For example, in the 1970s the new powertrain package of first-generation Ford Fiesta was developed using mules based on the then class-leading Fiat 127, as Ford had no comparable compact model of similar size to utilize.

Mules are also used to conceal styling changes and visible telltales of performance alterations in near-production vehicles, receiving varying degrees of camouflage to deceive rival makers and thwart a curious automotive press. Such alterations can span from distracting shrinkwrap designs, somewhat reminiscent of dazzle camouflage, to substituting crude cylindric shapes for taillights, non-standard wheels, or assemblages of plastic and tape to hide a vehicle's shape and design elements. The wraps may also serve as part of marketing techniques to promote future car reveals.

Development mules are often used very heavily during testing and scrapped. Automakers also use auto racing and develop components for race cars that serve as development mules for their performance parts, such as AMC’s "Group 19" program.

Occasionally, mule vehicles are acquired by members of the automaker's engineering team or executives overseeing the design process. In some cases, the test mules may be evaluated as being better than the final products.

== See also ==
- Automotive design
- Pre-production car
- Vehicle glider
- Clay modeling
