= ICar V23 =

Battery electric subcompact SUV

iCar V23

Overview
- Manufacturer: iCar (Chery)
- Also called: iCaur V23 (export); Chery V23 (Thailand)
- Production: December 2024 – present
- Assembly: China: Wuhu, Anhui; Indonesia: Bekasi, West Java (HIM); Bogor, West Java (Inchcape Indomobil); Thailand: Rayong (Omoda & Jaecoo Manufacturing (Thailand)); Malaysia: Shah Alam, Selangor

Body and chassis
- Class: Subcompact SUV (B)
- Body style: 5-door SUV
- Layout: Rear motor, rear-wheel-drive; Dual-motors, all-wheel drive
- Platform: i-MS platform
- Chassis: Unibody
- Related: iCar 03; iCar V27; iCar V25

Powertrain
- Electric motor: Qida permanent magnet motor
- Power output: 100 kW (134 hp; 136 PS) (RWD); 157 kW (211 hp; 213 PS) (4WD); 185 kW (248 hp; 252 PS) (Super V23 RWD); 335 kW (449 hp; 455 PS) (450S)
- Battery: 50.6–69.8 kWh CATL LFP battery; 80.16 or 81.7 kWh CATL NMC
- Range: Maximum 550 km (342 miles) (CLTC); Maximum 470 km (292 miles) (NEDC)

Dimensions
- Wheelbase: 2,730 mm (107.5 in)
- Length: 4,220 mm (166.1 in)
- Width: 1,915 mm (75.4 in)
- Height: 1,845 mm (72.6 in)
- Curb weight: 2,084–2,199 kg (4,594–4,848 lb)

The iCar V23 is a battery electric subcompact SUV produced by Chery under the iCar brand.

== History ==
Rear view

Interior

In April 2024, the V23 debuted at the Beijing Auto Show.

=== Design ===
The design of the V23 is a influenced by the Beijing BJ212, maintaining a raw aesthetic reminiscent of off-road vehicles and off-road aesthetics. It has a subcompact silhouette with low-set, round headlights adjacent to narrow, extended turn signals covering the edges of the fenders. The rear lamps are set similarly low, above which there is a large cable compartment in the shape of a rounded square.

The passenger cabin features an angular central console composed of a touchscreen multimedia system display, under which there is a set of three air vents and a panel of physical buttons to control vehicle functions.

== Specifications ==
Two specifications, both with a electric drive, were offered for the V23. The basic rear-wheel drive variant has a 136 hp engine, accelerates from 0 to 100 km/h (62 mph) in 11 seconds and has a 60 kWh battery with approximately 400 kilometers of range on a single charge. The top variant AWD has a 211 hp engine and 82 kWh battery, accelerates from 0 to 100 km/h (62 mph) in 7.5 seconds and has approximately 500 kilometers of range on a single charge.

== Markets ==
=== Indonesia ===
The iCar V23 was launched in Indonesia on 5 February 2026 at the 33rd Indonesia International Motor Show. Variants available include RWD and iWD original models, marketed as iCar V23 OG, along with Retro and Cyberspace Edition accessories packages and the flagship Pro Plus variant.

=== Malaysia ===
The iCaur V23 was launched in Malaysia on 27 November 2025, with two variants: 2WD (59.93 kWh) and iWD (81.76 kWh). In July 2026, the V23 became locally assembled in Shah Alam, Selangor. The CKD model is available in the sole iWD variant.

=== South Africa ===
The iCaur V23 was launched in South Africa on 28 May 2026, as part of Chery's sub-brand iCaur introduction in the South African market. It is available with RWD (59.9 kWh) and AWD (81.8 kWh) variants.

=== Thailand ===
The model was launched in Thailand as the Chery V23 on 30 September 2025, with three variants: Play (59.93 kWh), Plus (59.93 kWh) and Peak (81.76 kWh).

== Safety ==
ASEAN NCAP test results Chery iCaur V23 (2025)
Test	Points
Overall:	5 /5 stars
Adult occupant:	39.71
Child occupant:	16.67
Safety assist:	17.14
Motorcyclist Safety:	17.50

== Sales ==
Year	China
2024	3,232
2025	65,573
