= ICar V25 =

Range extender mid-size SUV

iCar V25

Overview
- Manufacturer: iCar (Chery)
- Also called: iCaur V25 (export)
- Production: July 2026 – present
- Assembly: China: Wuhu, Anhui

Body and chassis
- Class: Mid-size SUV (D)
- Body style: 5-door SUV
- Layout: Rear motor, rear-wheel-drive; Dual-motors, all-wheel drive
- Platform: i-MS platform
- Chassis: Unibody
- Related: iCar 03; iCar V23; iCar V27

Powertrain
- Engine: 1499 L SQRH4J15 turbo I4
- Electric motor: Qida permanent magnet motor
- Battery: 33.7 kWh CATL LFP battery (EREV)
- Range: 1,200 km (746 miles) (CLTC, combined)

Dimensions
- Wheelbase: 2,820 mm (111.0 in)
- Length: 4,636 mm (182.5 in)
- Width: 1,920 mm (75.6 in)
- Height: 1,855 mm (73.0 in)

The iCar V25 is a range-extended mid-size SUV produced by Chery under the iCar brand.

== Overview ==
The model was initially revealed in July 2026 before being released at the 2026 Chengdu Motor Show. It made its global market debut on 19 October 2026, at the Chery International Driver Summit. In the iCar global lineup, the V25 is positioned between the V23 and the V27. Sales of the V25 was commenced on 19 November 2026 in China.

The V25 continues to the design language of the iCar V series which also used in the smaller V23, adopting a boxy shape and rounded headlights. It was features a newly designed open grille at the front, and the window design.

Rear view

Interior

It was features 19-inch wheels, altough 21-inch wheel is available as a option. The rear design retains the boxy-shaped spare tire element, and the overall lines have been redesigned to soften the ruggedness.

The central infotainment display was equipped with a 15.4-inch 2.5 K floating control screen with an 8-inch LCD instrument panel, retains physical buttons.

The V25 dimensions measures 4,636 mm (182.5 in) in lenght, 1,920 mm (75.6 in) in width and 1,855 mm (73.0 in) in height, and 2,820 mm (111.0 in) i wheelbase, thanks to its four-wheel-drive drivetrain and short front and rear overhangs.

== Specifications ==
The V25 comes with a REEV powertrain configuration with a 1,500cc 4-inline Turbo engine with 115 kW (154 hp; 156 PS) of power and 220 N⋅m (160 lb⋅ft; 22 kg⋅m) of torque, which acts as a generator for an electric motor with two configurations: RWD with 252 kW (338 hp; 343 PS) of power and 300 N⋅m (220 lb⋅ft; 31 kg⋅m) of torque, or iWD with 455 kW (610 hp; 619 PS) of power and 505 N⋅m (372 lb⋅ft; 51.5 kg⋅m) of torque. The battery from LFP produced by CATL with a capacity of 33.7 kWh, which claimed up to 210 km (130 mi) (CLTC) (170 km (110 mi) (WLTP)) in EV mode and has a combined range of up to 1,200 km (750 mi).

The V25 is equipped with a 1.5 T petrol engine combined with range extender electric, offering a choice of rear motor, rear-wheel-drive or dual-motor four-wheel drive. Basically, The 1.5 T petrol engine has a maximum power of 115 kW, combining by the single motor version has a maximum motor power of 185 kW and a peak torque of 300 Nm. While the dual motor version has a total motor power of 335 kW and a peak torque of 505 Nm. Both models have a top speed claimed of 180 kilometres per hour (110 mph).
