= Lü Yiyu =

Chinese rally driver

- Nationality: (China) Chinese
- Born: 1973 (age 52–53) Guangdong, China

Lü Yiyu (Chinese: 吕亦瑜; pinyin: Lǚ Yìyú, Guangdong, November 1973) is a Chinese rally driver and businessman.

== Biography ==
In 2001, Lü won the South China Cross-Country Challenge Championship and was runner up in the Guangdong Cross-Country Rally. In 2002, he founded the outdoor sports brand "Life Unlimited", which as of 2023 has over 100 stores in China. In 2010, he led the "Life Unlimited" team to the victory of the China Formula Grand Prix. In 2024, he took part with his son Lü Jingxi to the EcoRally Cup China, where they placed ninth in the regularity standings (first among the Chinese crews).
