= ICar (marque) =

Marque of vehicle manufacturer Chery

iCar Ecological Technology Co., Ltd.
- Type: Subsidiary
- Industry: Automotive
- Founded: April 2023; 3 years ago
- Headquarters: Wuhu, Anhui, China
- Area served: China (iCar); Worldwide (iCaur)
- Key people: Chen Jian (brand operations officer)
- Products: Automobiles
- Parent: Chery Automobile

Chinese name
- Simplified Chinese: 爱咖生态科技有限公司
- Hanyu Pinyin: Àikā Shēngtài Kējì Yǒuxiàn Gōngsī
- Website: icarglobal.com (China); icaurglobal.com (global)

iCar Ecological Technology Co., Ltd., trading as iCar (stylized as iCAR), or iCaur (stylized as iCAUR) outside China, is a subsidiary of Chinese vehicle manufacturer Chery. The iCar brand was established as an electric vehicle brand in April 2023, following several previous usage of the trademark by Chery. iCar started sales of its first vehicle, the iCar 03 SUV in February 2024. In April 2025, the brand was renamed to iCaur for overseas markets due to trademark reasons.

== History ==
The iCar brand has been used by Chery several times prior to its usage as a standalone electric car brand. In 2007, the Àikǎ name (similar to Àikā, the Chinese name of iCar) was used for a pickup truck, Karry Aika. In 2014, the platform used by the Chery Arrizo 7 was marketed as iCar. In 2017, iCar became an "ecosystem" brand owned by Chery. Past use of the brand include a digital ecosystem, along with online and offline direct sales store network selling Chery New Energy vehicles such as the Chery QQ Ice Cream. The Chery eQ1 is also marketed as the Caoa Chery iCar in Brazil since August 2023.

Initial logo in 2023

The brand was spun off into an electric car brand in April 2023 at the Auto Shanghai. The "i" logo of iCar was designed by Cao Xue, the creator of the panda mascot of the 2022 Winter Olympics in Beijing. According to Chery, "i" stands for intelligence, internet, innovation, individual, inspiration, and information. The brand targets younger people aged 25–35 who are pursuing new careers. At the auto show, the brand debuted two cars, the iCar 03 and the iCar GT sports car concept. The brand plans to market four product series covering MPV, SUVs, and sports cars.

CATL announced that they will be incorporating their sodium-ion batteries into the Chery iCar.

Pilot production of the iCar 03 started in June 2023, while pre-orders were opened in November 2023. It went on sale on 28 February 2024.

iCaur logo for overseas markets

On April 7, 2024, the second vehicle, the iCar V23 made its debut in China. The V23 is the first model jointly developed by Chery and Zhimi Technology, and was officially unveiled on April 12, 2024, and launched in the second half of 2024. Zhimi Technology's car manufacturing division started as early as the end of 2021, with the V23 being its first project. Originally developed independently to be part of Zhimi's product lines and earliest vehicle product, the V23 project and Zhimi Technology's car manufacturing division and assets was later bought by Chery and merged with the existing iCar brand in 2024.

== Products ==
=== Current models ===
- iCar V23 (2024–present), subcompact SUV, BEV
- iCar V25 (2026–present), compact SUV, EREV
- iCar V27 (2026–present), mid-size SUV, EREV
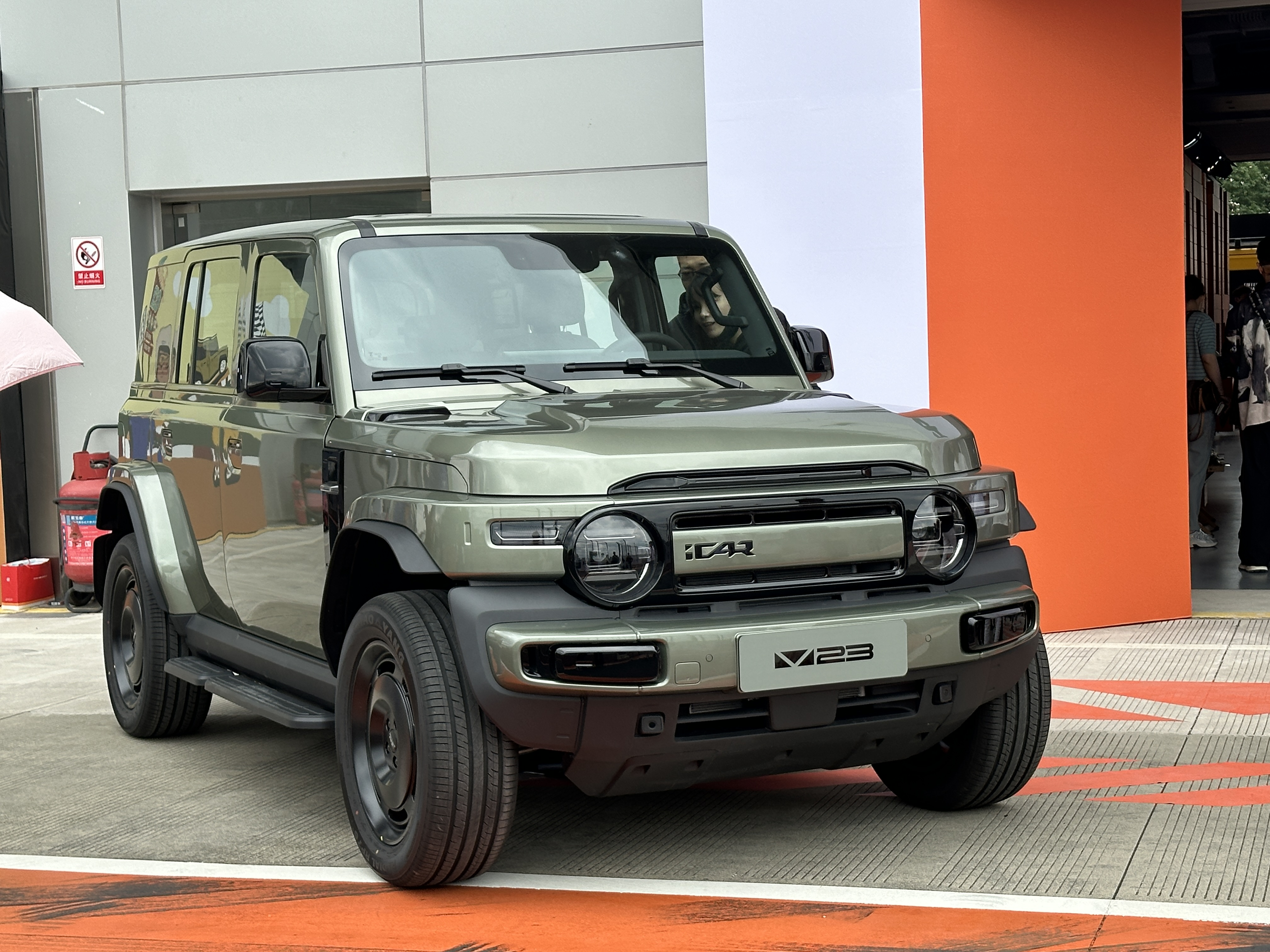
iCar V23

iCar V25

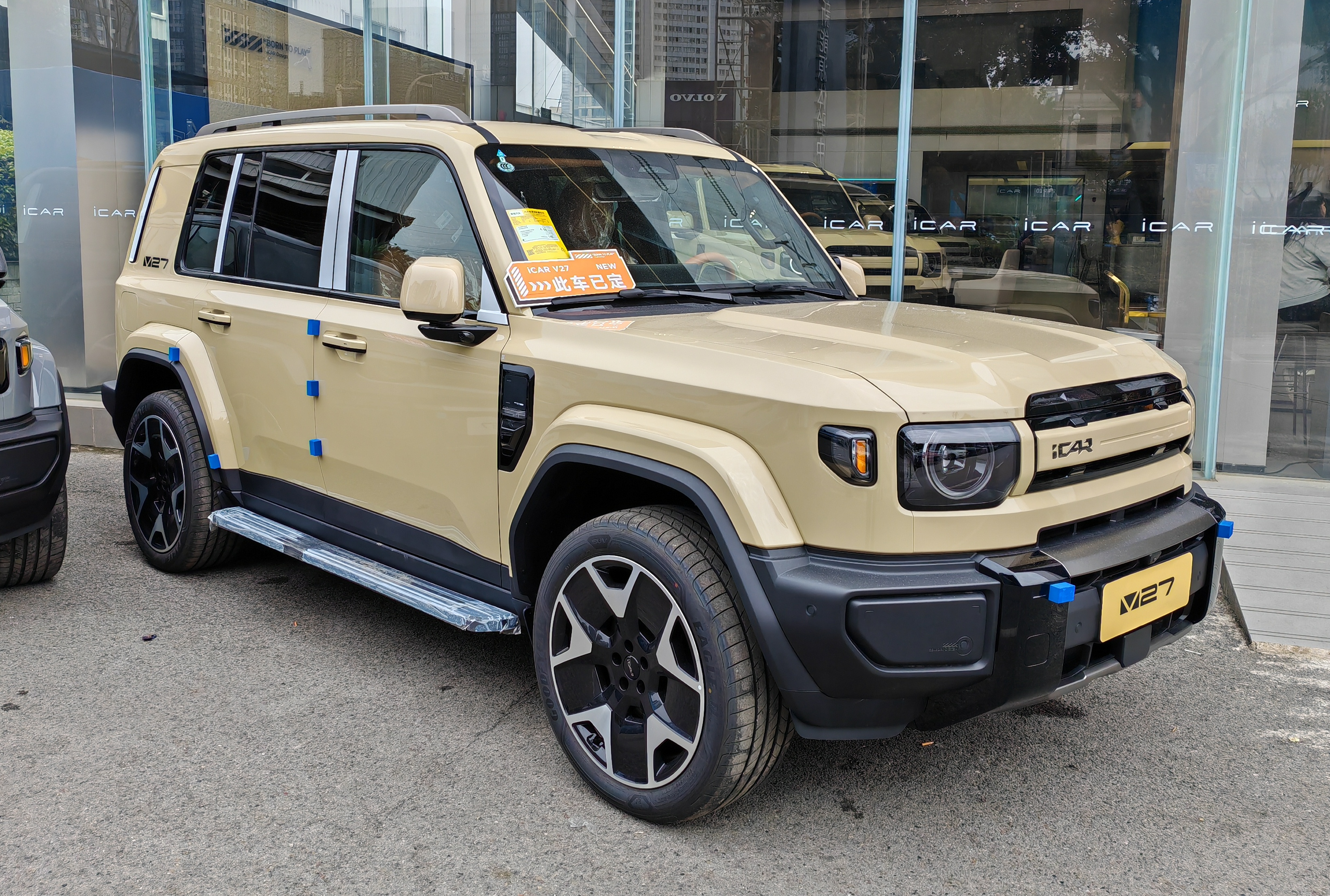
iCar V27

=== Current models (exported only) ===
- iCaur 03 (2024–present), compact SUV, BEV
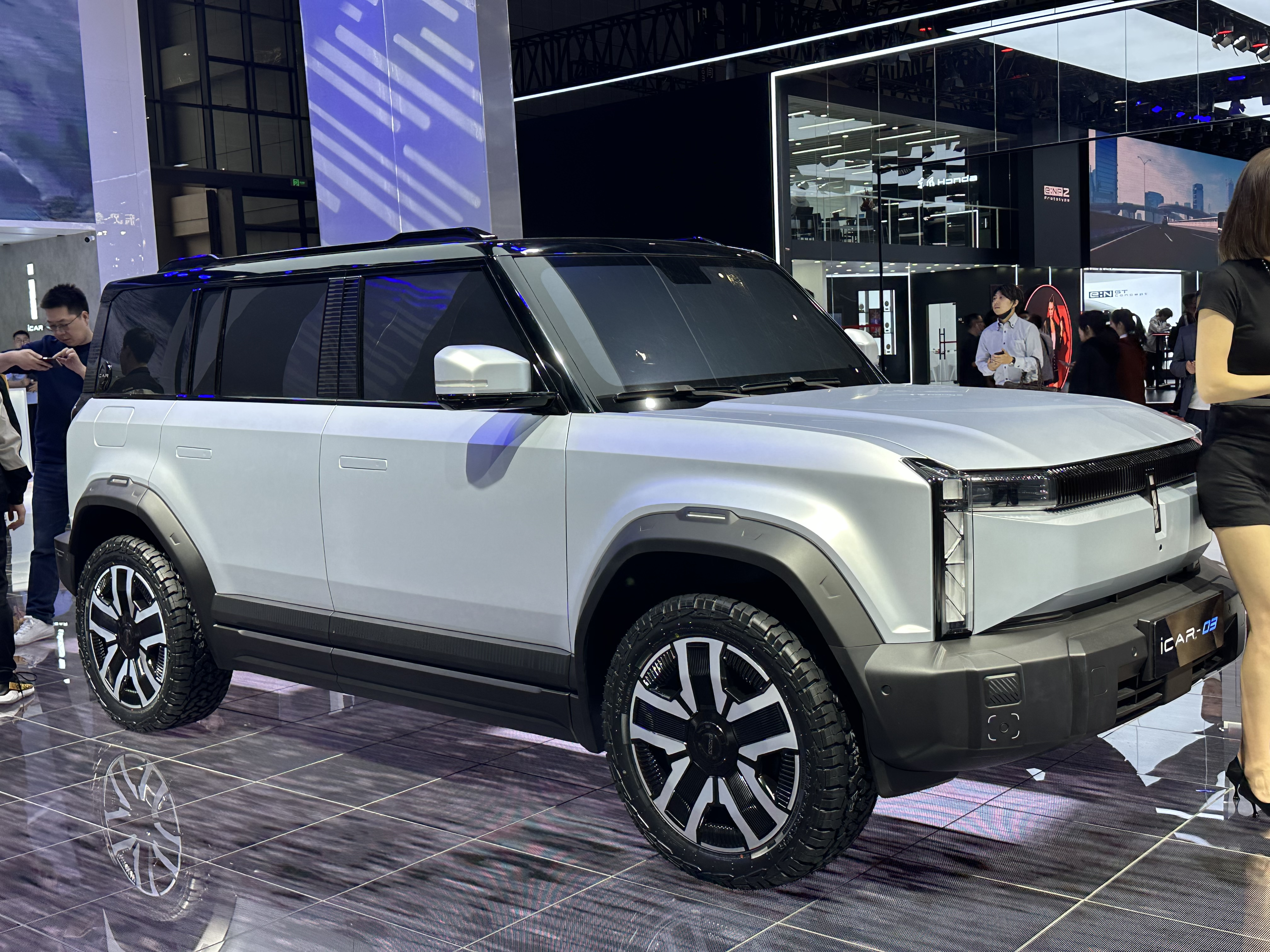
iCar 03

=== Concept car ===
- iCar GT
- iCar X25
- iCar Robox
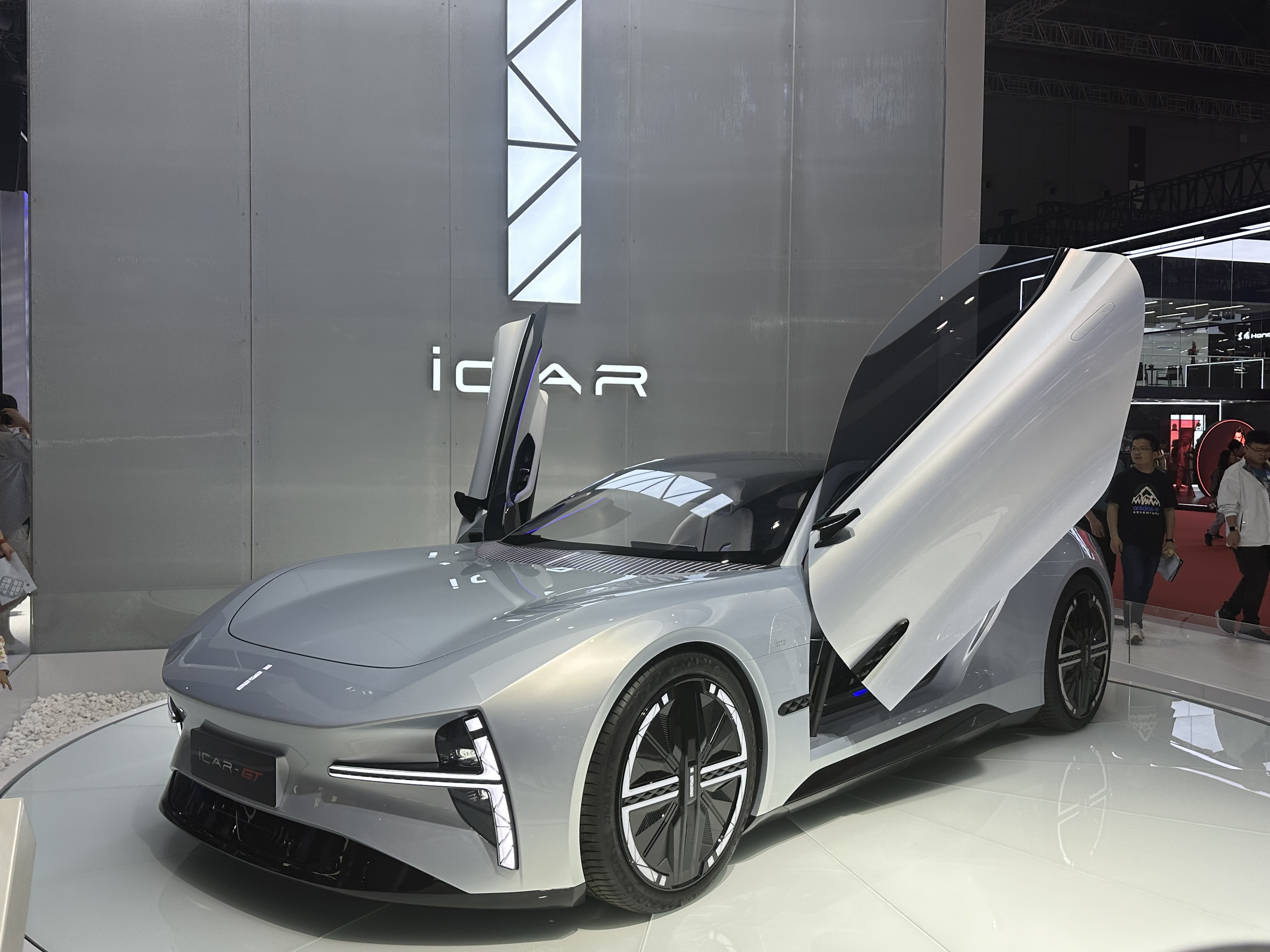
iCar GT

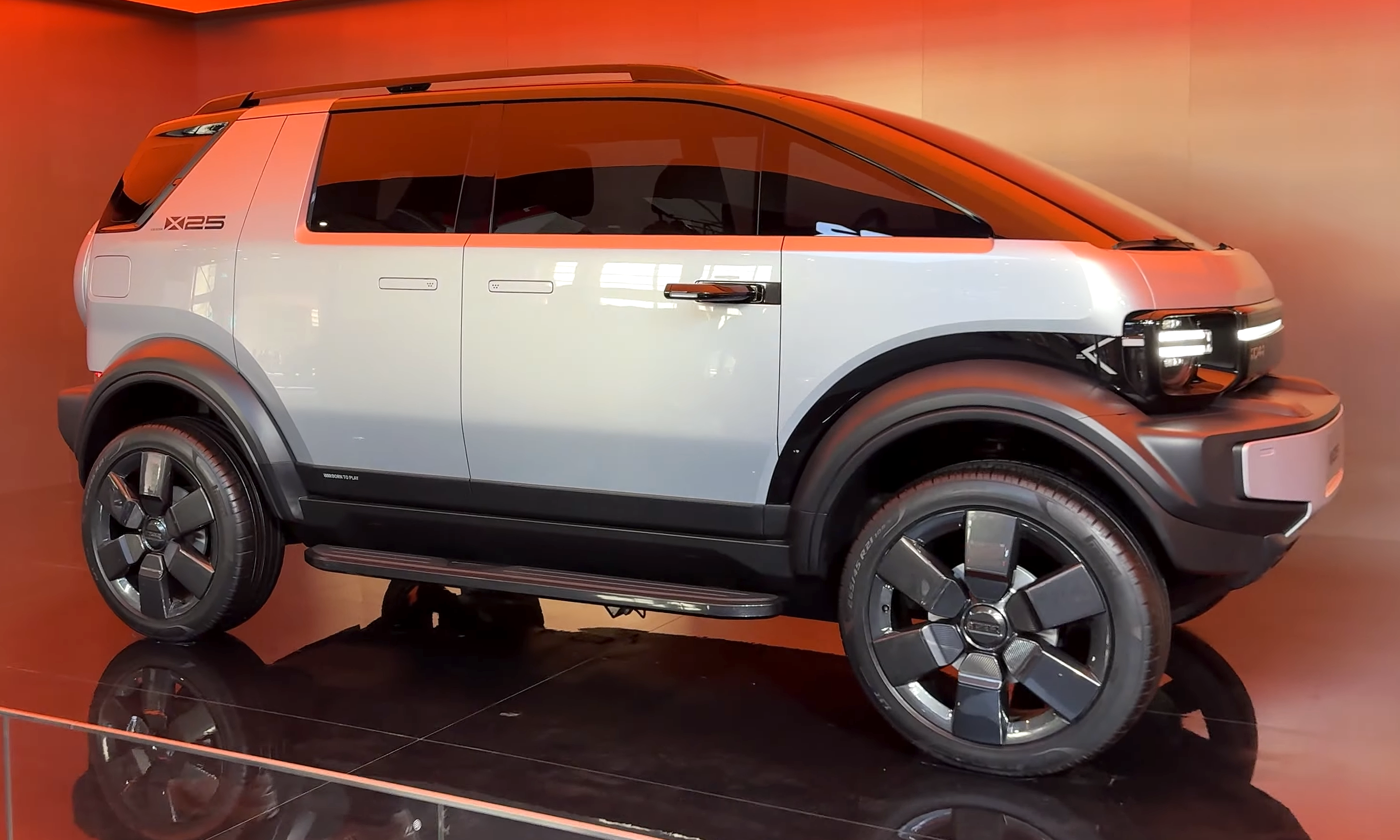
iCar X25

== Related brand ==
The iCar 03 became available in some overseas markets under the Aiqar marque, an electric vehicle brand of Chery International in countries such as Armenia, Georgia, Cambodia, Uzbekistan, and Curaçao. Aiqar sells rebadged versions of iCar and Chery New Energy models.

== Sales ==
Year	Sales
2023	1,445
2024	65,964

== See also ==
- Omoda
- Jaecoo
- Jetour
- Exeed
- Luxeed
- Karry
- Automobile manufacturers and brands of China
- List of automobile manufacturers of China
