= Shirley Fernández Bellas =

Spanish rally driver

Shirley Fernández
- Nationality: (Spain) Spanish
- Born: 1996 (age 29–30) Viveiro, Spain
- Current team: Hyundai

Shirley María Fernández Bellas (Viveiro, born in 1996) is a Spanish rally driver.

== Career ==
She and her father co-driver Antonio "Cubi" Fernández won Spanish regularity championship for hybrid vehicles in 2023. In 2024 they took part in the FIA ecoRally Cup and placed second in the eRally Iceland. In the same year they conquered one victory and two third places in the EcoRally Cup China.
