= ICar V27 =

Range extender mid-size SUV

iCar V27

Overview
- Manufacturer: iCar (Chery)
- Also called: iCaur V27 (export); Esteo V27 (Russia)
- Production: January 2026 – present
- Assembly: China: Wuhu, Anhui; Russia: St. Petersburg (AGR Holding); Indonesia: Bekasi, West Java (HIM); Thailand: Rayong (Omoda & Jaecoo Manufacturing (Thailand))

Body and chassis
- Class: Mid-size SUV (E)
- Body style: 5-door SUV
- Layout: Front-engine, rear-motor, rear-wheel drive; Front-engine, dual-motor, all-wheel drive
- Platform: i-MS platform
- Chassis: Unibody
- Related: iCar 03; iCar V23; iCar V25

Powertrain
- Engine: Petrol range extender: 1.5 L SQRE4T15C I4 turbo
- Electric motor: Permanent magnet motor
- Power output: 100–115 kW (134–154 hp; 136–156 PS) (engine); 185 kW (248 hp; 252 PS) (RWD); 336 kW (451 hp; 457 PS) (4WD)
- Hybrid drivetrain: Series hybrid (EREV)
- Battery: 20.4 / 34.3 and 51.2 kWh CATL LFP
- Range: 1,200–1,300 km (746–808 mi) (CLTC); 1,000–1,110 km (621–690 mi) (NEDC)
- Electric range: 200–300 km (124–186 mi) (CLTC); 95–165 km (59–103 mi) (NEDC)

Dimensions
- Wheelbase: 2,910 mm (114.6 in)
- Length: 4,909 mm (193.3 in)
- Width: 1,976 mm (77.8 in)
- Height: 1,894 mm (74.6 in)

The iCar V27 is a range-extended mid-size SUV produced by Chery under the iCar brand. The V27 is the first plug-in hybrid vehicle from the Chinese brand.

== History ==
In August 2025, the V27 was debuted in the Dubai. It went on sale in China on 13 March 2026.

The V27 comes equipped with a range extended powertrain that pairs a 1.5 liter turbocharged engine with an electric motor, offered in both rear-wheel-drive and all-wheel-drive versions.

The 1.5 liter engine generates a maximum power output of 105 kW (141 hp). The rear-wheel-drive variant is fitted with a single electric motor producing up to 185 kW (248 hp), whereas the all-wheel-drive model uses dual electric motors with a combined peak power of 335 kW (449 hp), enabling it to accelerate from 0 to 100 km/h (62 mph) in 5.5 seconds. As for driving range, the V27 is fitted with a 34.3 kWh battery pack, delivering CLTC pure electric ranges of 200 km (124 mi) and 210 km (130 mi) for the respective versions, along with combined driving ranges of 1,200 km (746 mi) and 1,230 km (764 mi).

Rear view

Interior

== Markets ==
=== Thailand ===
The iCaur V27 was launched in Thailand on 29 September 2026, as the first model to be marketed under the iCaur marque in Thailand. Initially imported from China, it is available with three variants: Pride 2WD, Prime 2WD and Prestige 4WD.
