= ICar 03 =

Battery electric compact crossover SUV

Chery Fulwin X3
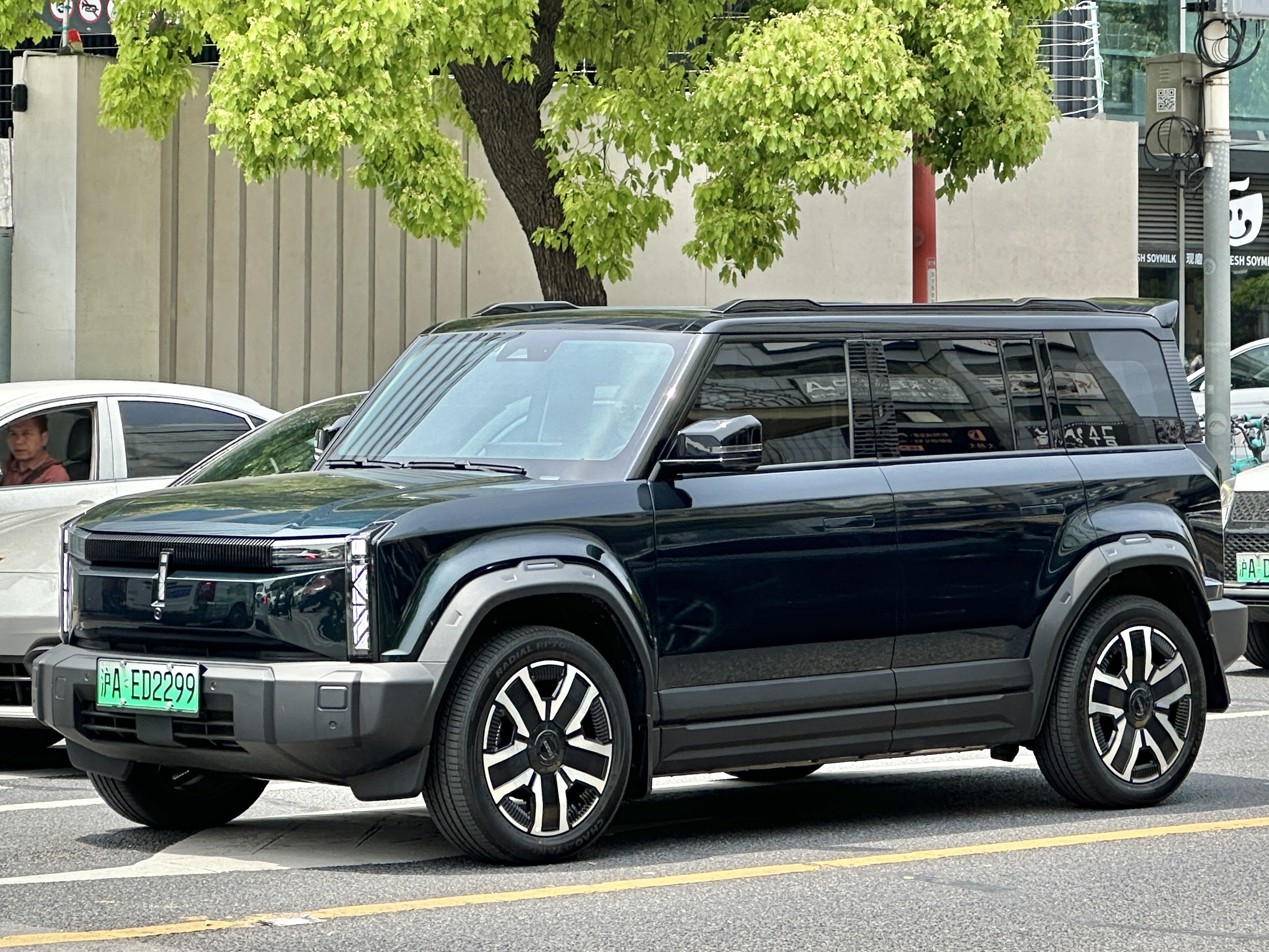

Overview
- Manufacturer: Chery
- Also called: Chery Fulwin X3/X3 Plus/X3L (China, 2025–present); iCar 03 (China, 2023–2025); iCaur 03 (export); Chery iCar 03; Jaecoo J6; Jaecoo EJ6 (Philippines); Jaecoo 6 EV (Thailand); Chery J6 (Indonesia); Chery i03 (Tunisia); Jaecoo J6T (Thailand, facelift); Aiqar eQ3 (Armenia, Georgia, Cambodia, Uzbekistan, Curaçao, Laos)
- Production: December 2023 – present
- Assembly: China: Wuhu, Anhui; Indonesia: Bekasi, West Java (HIM); Thailand: Rayong (Omoda & Jaecoo Manufacturing (Thailand)); Malaysia: Shah Alam, Selangor

Body and chassis
- Class: Compact crossover SUV (C)
- Body style: 5-door SUV
- Layout: EV: Rear motor, rear-wheel-drive; Dual-motors, all-wheel drive; EREV: Front-engine, Rear motor, rear-wheel-drive; Front-engine, Dual-motors, all-wheel drive
- Platform: i-MS platform
- Chassis: Unibody
- Related: iCar V23; iCar V27; iCar V25

Powertrain
- Engine: Petrol range extender: 1.5 L SQRE4T15C I4 turbo
- Electric motor: Permanent magnet motor
- Power output: 137 kW (184 hp; 186 PS) (RWD); 185 kW (248 hp; 252 PS) (Fulwin X3); 208 kW (279 hp; 283 PS) (4WD); 255 kW (342 hp; 347 PS) (Fulwin X3 AWD); 315 kW (422 hp; 428 PS) (Fulwin X3L)
- Hybrid drivetrain: Series hybrid (EREV; Fulwin X3L)
- Battery: 33.6 kWh CATL LFP (EREV); 50.6–69.8 kWh CATL LFP battery
- Range: 1,200 km (746 mi) (CLTC); Maximum 800 km (497 mi) (NEDC)
- Electric range: EV: Maximum 501 km (311 mi); EREV: 135–215 km (84–134 mi) (CLTC); 160–190 km (99–118 mi) (NEDC)

Dimensions
- Wheelbase: 2,715 mm (106.9 in) (03, 03T, Fulwin X3, Fulwin X3 Plus); 2,783 mm (109.6 in) (Fulwin X3L)
- Length: 4,406 mm (173.5 in); 4,432 mm (174.5 in) (03T); 4,327 mm (170.4 in) (Fulwin X3); 4,380 mm (172.4 in) (Fulwin X3 Plus); 4,545 mm (178.9 in) (Fulwin X3L)
- Width: 1,910 mm (75.2 in) (03, Fulwin X3); 1,916 mm (75.4 in) (03T, Fulwin X3 Plus); 1,950 mm (76.8 in) (Fulwin X3L)
- Height: 1,715 mm (67.5 in) (03, Fulwin X3); 1,741 mm (68.5 in) (03T, Fulwin X3 Plus); 1,815 mm (71.5 in) (Fulwin X3L)
- Kerb weight: 1,679–1,892 kg (3,702–4,171 lb)

The Chery Fulwin X3 (Chinese: 奇瑞风云X3; pinyin: Qíruì Fēngyún X3), previously known as iCar 03. is a battery electric compact crossover SUV produced by Chery Automobile under the Chery and iCar brand. The vehicle was first presented at the Chengdu Motor Show in 2023. It is exported since 2024 under various names, including Jaecoo J6, Chery J6, Aiqar eQ3, and iCaur 03.

== History ==
In April 2023, at Auto Shanghai, Chery unveiled its new iCar brand and the first model, of the 03 electric compact crossover SUV. However, this vehicle was brought to the exhibition as a concept car. Later, the production version of the electric crossover was shown.

The letter "i" in the car logo was designed by Cao Xue, chief designer of the Guangzhou Academy of Arts and the author of the mascots of the 2022 Winter Olympics. An additional box is installed in the fifth door.

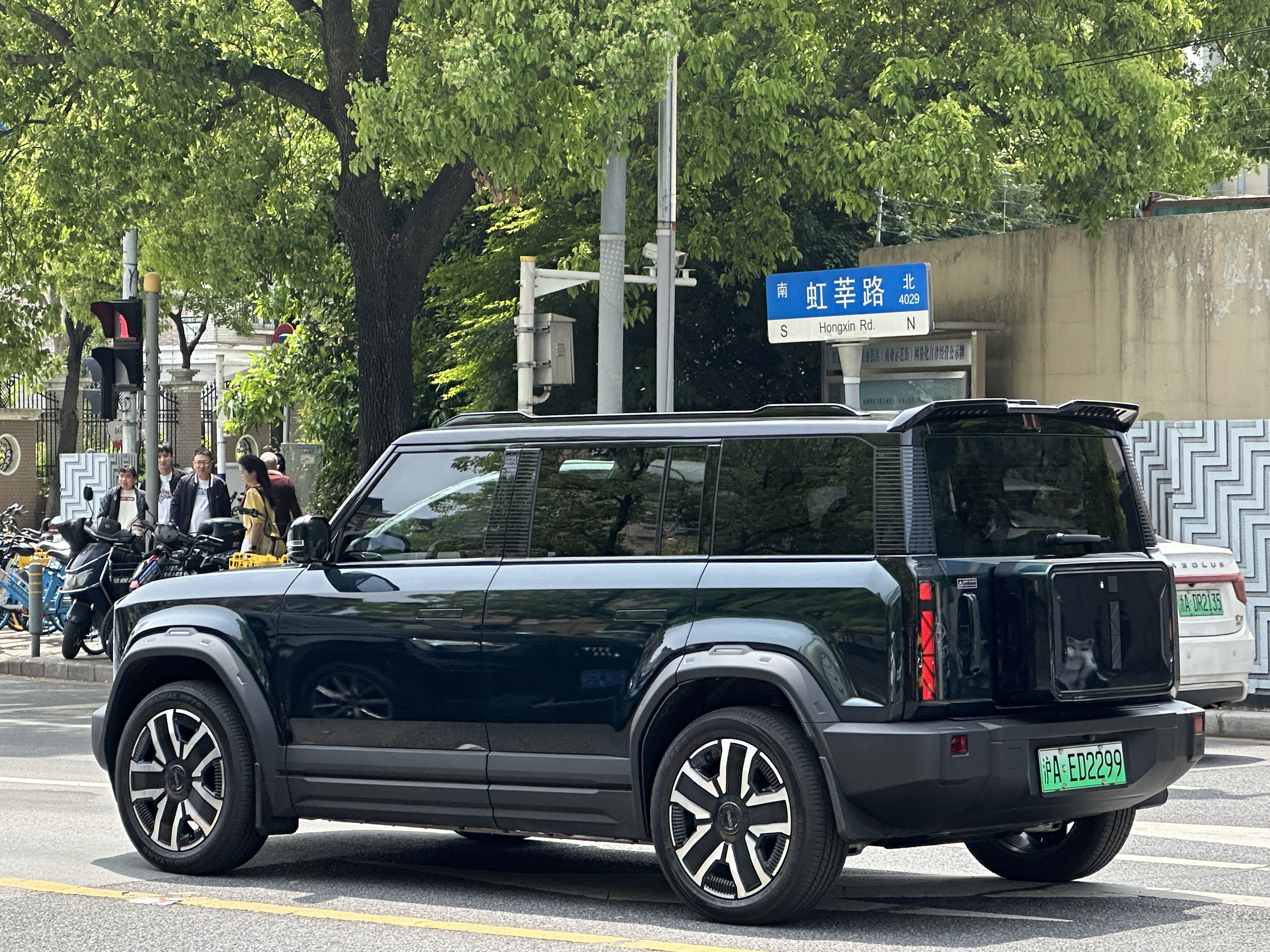
Rear view

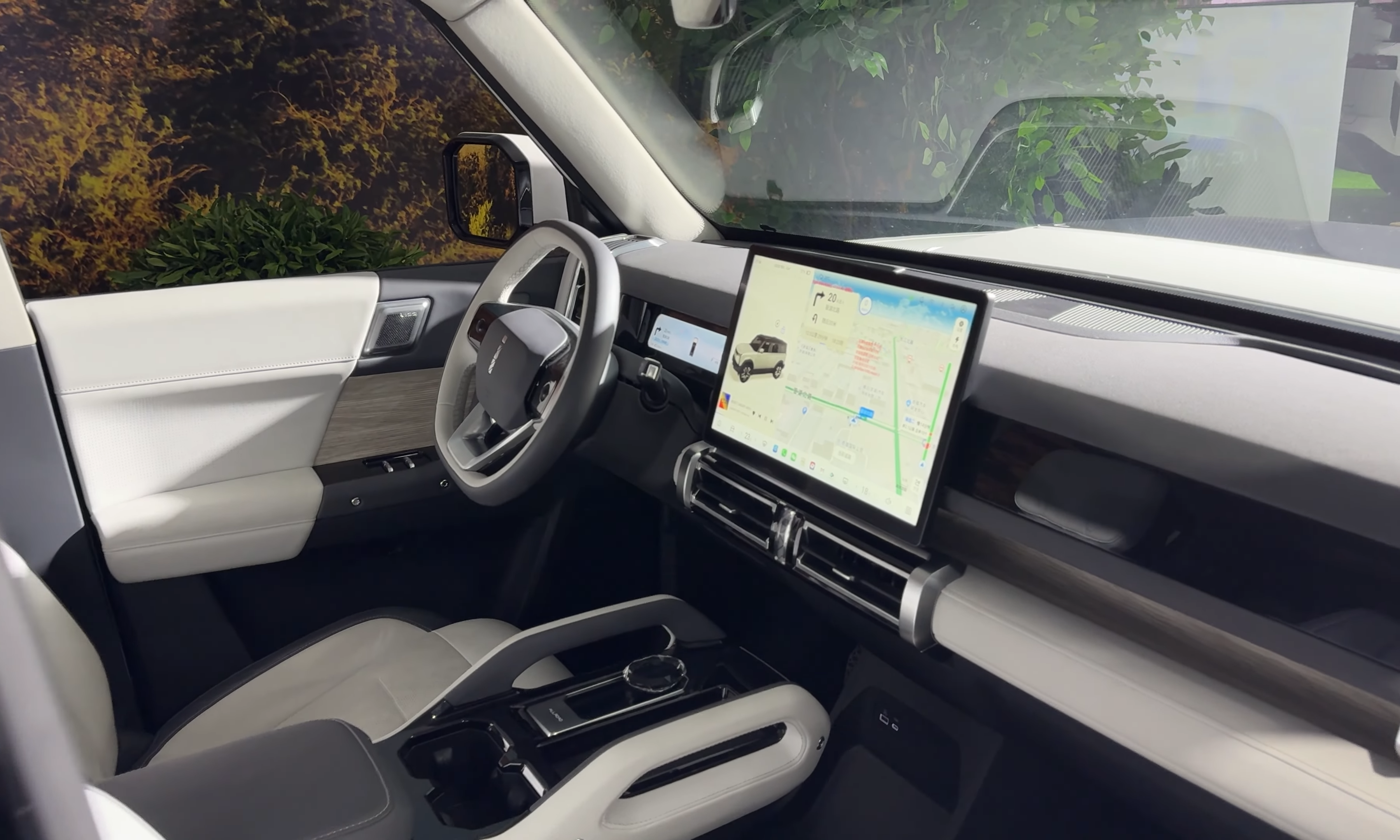
Interior

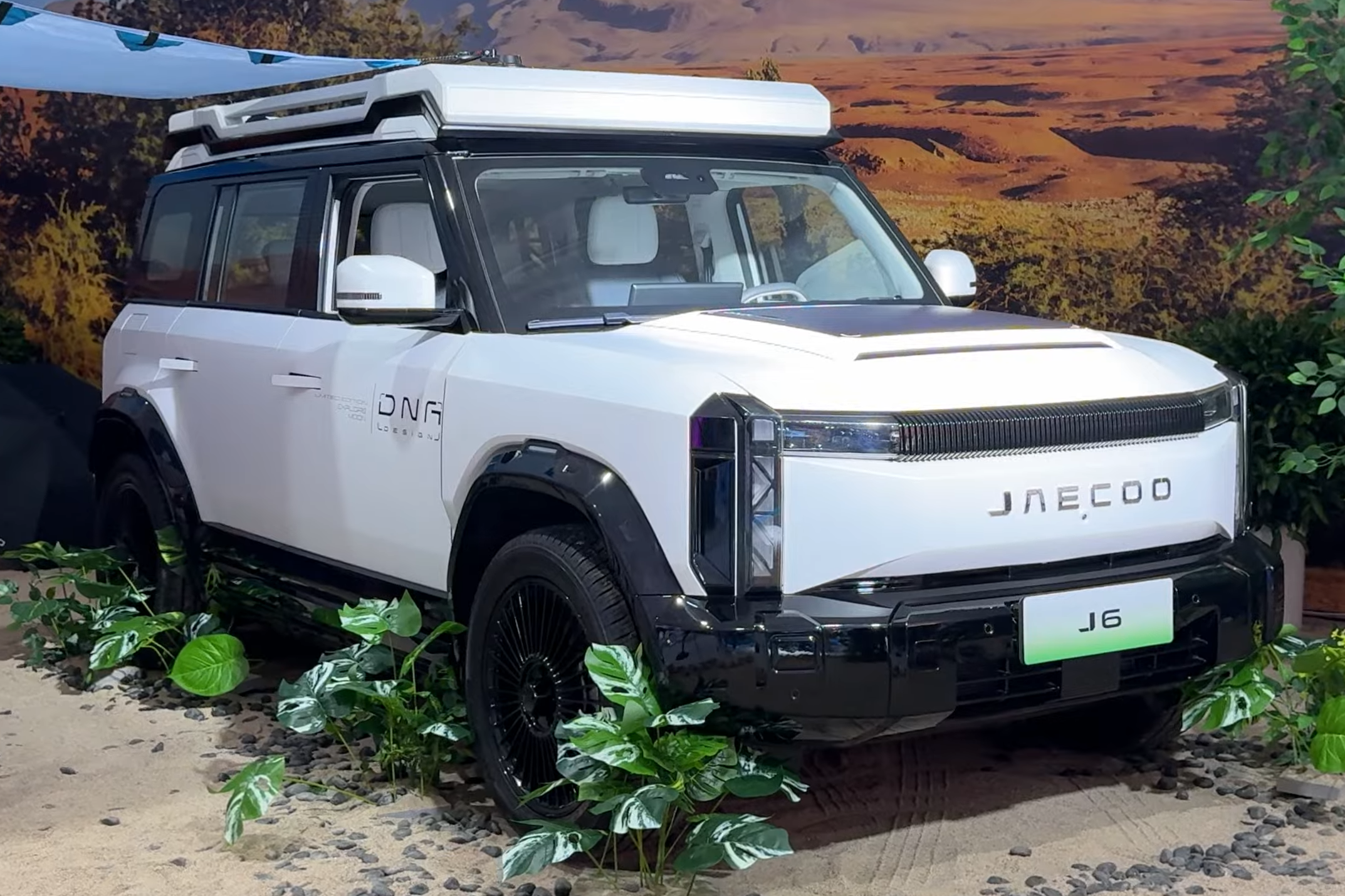
Jaecoo J6

=== Interior ===
The center console of the 03 is covered with a soft cover, there is a large screen in the centre, there are no buttons on the instrument panel, all control is done from the screen and using the buttons on the steering wheel.

== Specifications ==
The body of the 03 is made of steel and aluminium, and a sliding sectional panoramic roof can be installed for an additional fee. The front and rear suspensions are mutually independent. The size of the wheels is 19 inches.

The 03 powerplant consists of a 185-horsepower motor with electronically controlled all-wheel drive and a CATL battery. The maximum speed of iCar 03 is 150 km/h (93 mph), and the battery reserve can reach 500 km (310 mi). In addition, the car is equipped with solar panels mounted on the roof to increase the range.

== iCar 03T ==
A premium and sportier variant called as the iCar 03T was launched in 2024. The 03T was developed by Zhimi Technology's car manufacturing division after the team merged with Chery's iCar division. The 03T was developed as an improved version of the original 03 to fit better with the later launched V23 and future products, featuring a restyled body kit, wide wheel arches, more offroad inspired gears, and improved performance.

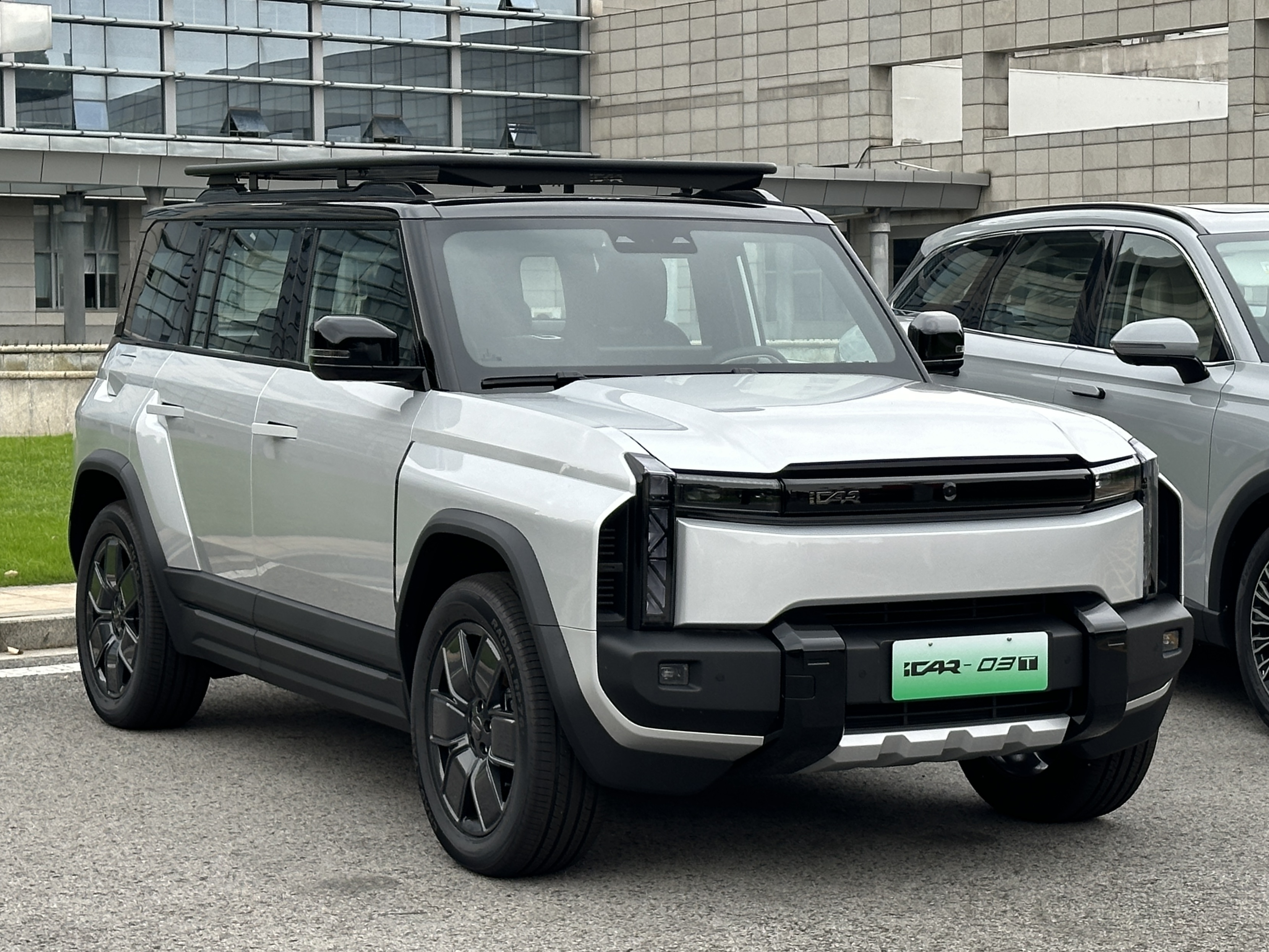
iCar 03T

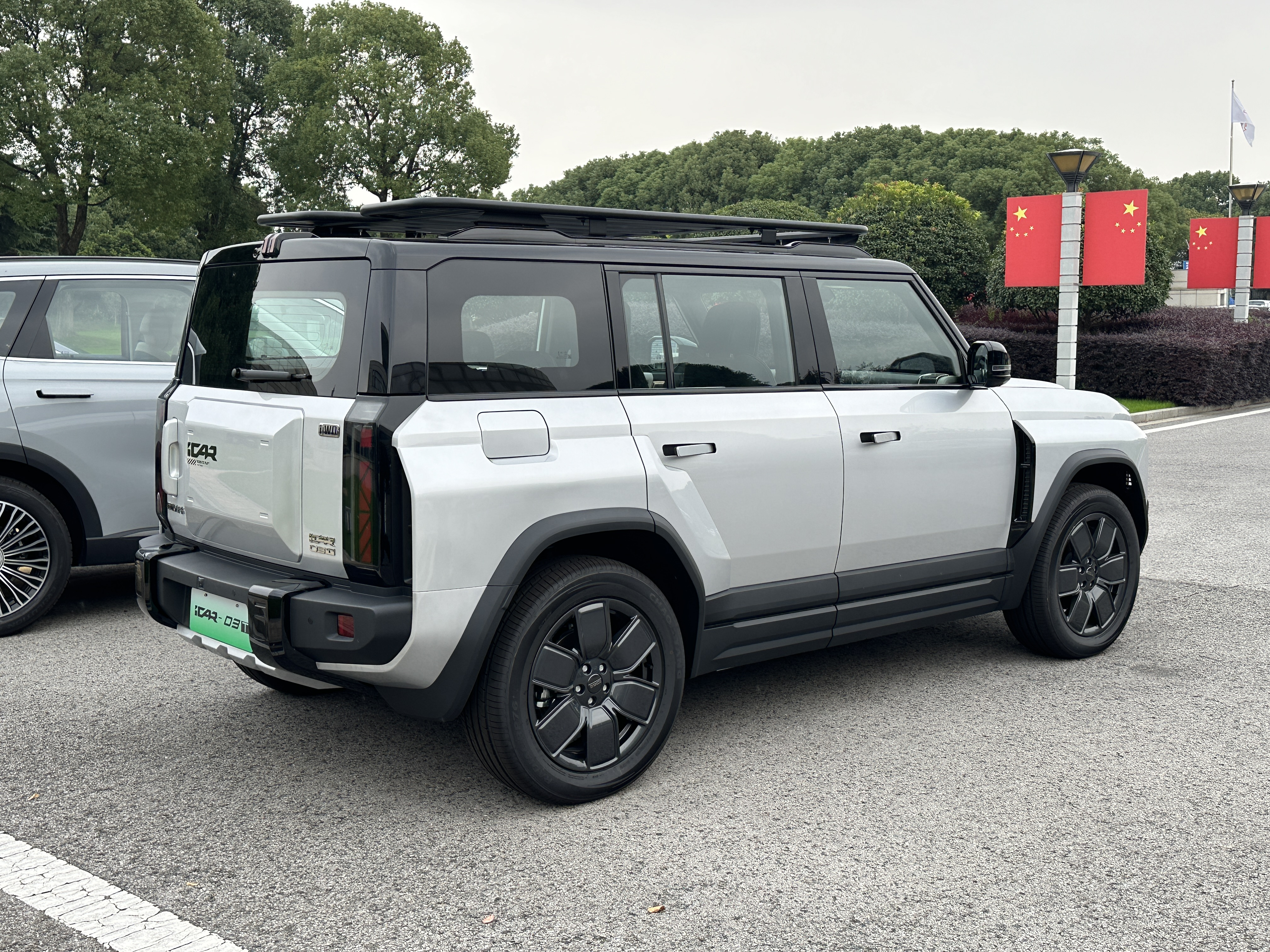
Rear view

== Chery Fulwin X3/X3 Plus/X3L ==
The Chery Fulwin X3, Fulwin X3 Plus and Fulwin X3L was unveiled on 21 July 2025 and 30 July 2025 as the EV/EREV variant of the iCar 03/03T to be sold under the Fulwin NEV product series. The Chery Fulwin X3/X3 Plus and Fulwin X3L went on sale in China on 16 August 2025 and 17 September 2025.

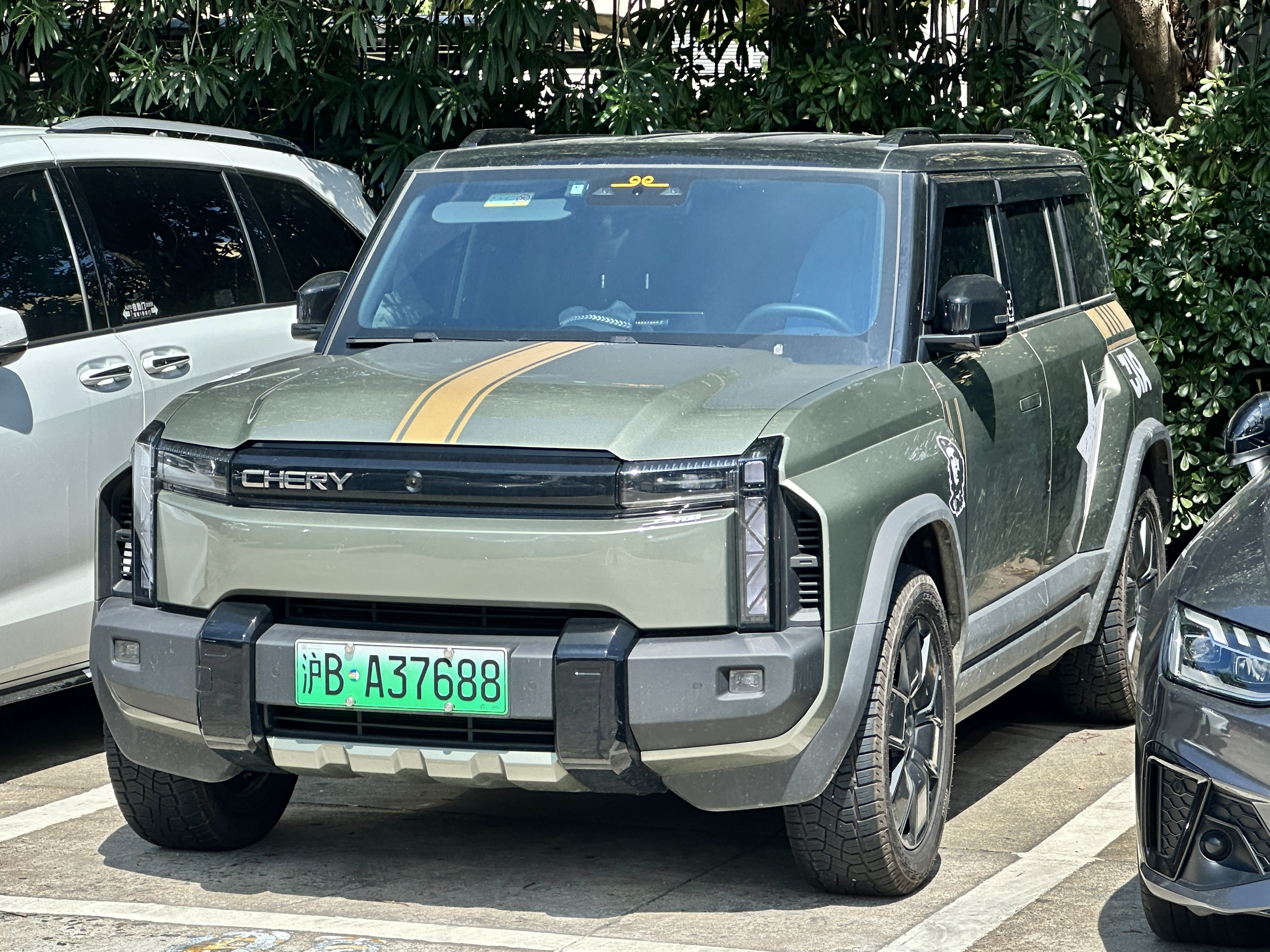
Chery Fulwin X3 Plus

Chery Fulwin X3L

Rear view

=== Tianmen Mountain stunt attempt ===
On 12 November 2025, Chery attempted a stunt to drive a Fulwin X3L up the 999 steps of Tianmen Mountain in Hunan, China. The event was intended to replicate a 2018 marketing stunt performed by the Range Rover Sport. During the ascent, the driver lost control of the vehicle approximately halfway up the stairway. The car rolled backward down the steps and collided with the historic stone railings, which prevented the vehicle from falling over the adjacent cliff. Following the incident, Chery issued a formal apology and pledged to fully restore the damaged infrastructure and compensate for the resulting damages.

== Markets ==
=== Indonesia ===
The iCar 03 was first introduced in Indonesia on 17 July 2024 at the 31st Gaikindo Indonesia International Auto Show, and later went on sale as the Chery J6 EV on 22 November 2024 at the 2024 Gaikindo Jakarta Auto Week. In Indonesia, it is available with four variants: RWD, RWD Phantom Edition, iWD and iWD Phantom Edition. At launch, the Phantom Edition model was limited to 300 units.

In November 2025, Chery introduced the flagship version of the J6 EV in Indonesia, named the J6T EV, with RWD and iWD variants. This model features a redesigned front and rear fascia designs for a sportier appearance, and the interior features new seat designs and a new display for the instrument panel.

A Range-Extender version of the J6T was unveiled on 29 July 2026, named the J6T CSH, with RWD and iWD variants. The CSH model is powered by a 1.500cc 4-cylinder turbo engine and a 33,67 kWh LFP battery by CATL.

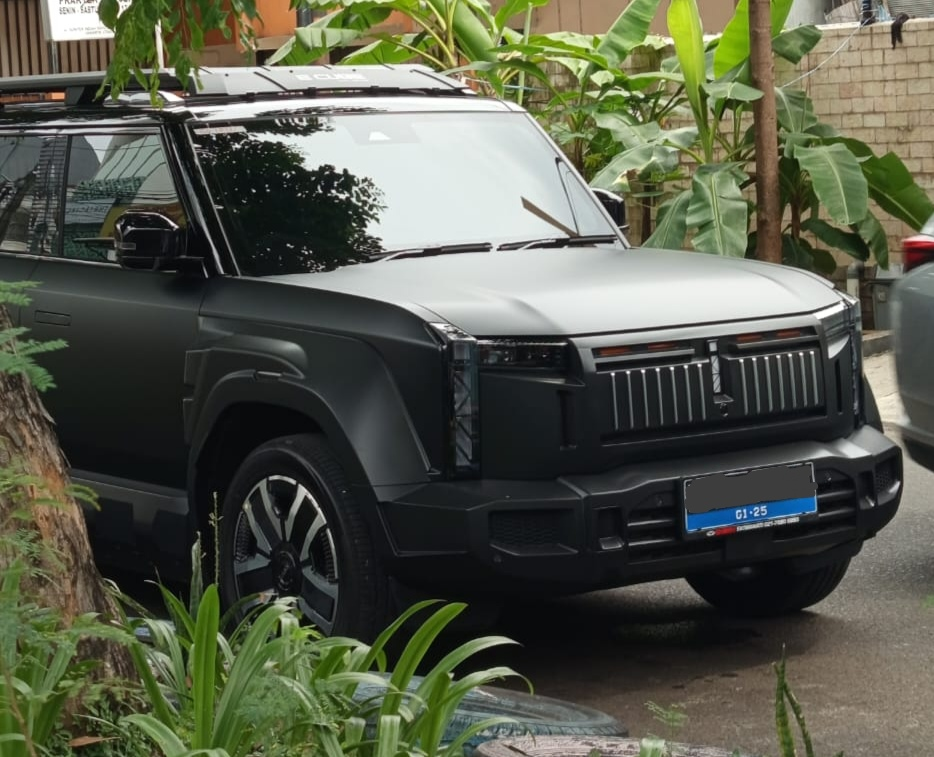
Chery J6 iWD Phantom Edition

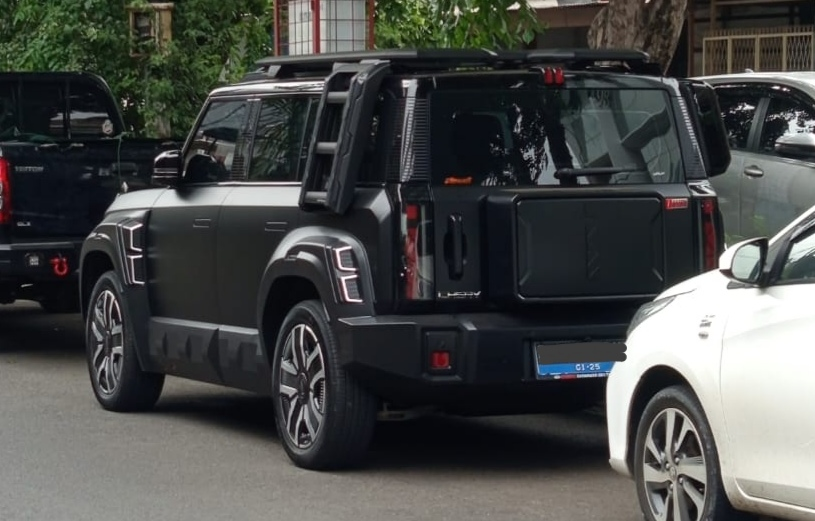
Rear view

=== Malaysia ===
The iCaur 03 was previewed in Malaysia in May 2025 at the Malaysia Autoshow 2025, as part of Chery's sub-brand iCaur introduction to the Malaysian market. It was launched in Malaysia on 9 September 2025, with 2WD (65.7 kWh) and iWD (69.8 kWh) variants, initially imported from China. In May 2026, the iCaur 03 became locally assembled in Shah Alam, Selangor. The CKD model was initially available in the sole iWD variant.

=== Philippines ===
The iCar 03 was launched in the Philippines in February 2025 as the Jaecoo EJ6, with RWD and AWD variants both using the 69.7 kWh battery.

=== Singapore ===
The iCar 03 was launched in Singapore on 16 January 2025 as the Jaecoo J6, in a sole AWD variant using the 69.7 kWh battery. The RWD model using the 65.6 kWh battery, eligible for the Category A Certificate of Entitlement (COE) bracket, was added in July 2025.

=== South Africa ===
The iCaur 03T was launched in South Africa on 28 May 2026, as part of Chery's sub-brand iCaur introduction in the South African market. It is available with RWD (65.7 kWh) and AWD (69.8 kWh) variants.

=== Thailand ===
The iCar 03 went on sale in Thailand as the Jaecoo 6 EV on 6 August 2024, in two variants: Long Range RWD and Long Range AWD. The entry-level Long Range 2WD Pro variant was added in March 2025. In November 2025, the iCar 03T as the Jaecoo 6T EV was introduced in Thailand and it is available with sole variants: Long Range AWD. In June 2026, the REEV model marketed as the Jaecoo 6T REEV was introduced in Thailand and it is available with two variants: 2WD Max and 4WD Ultra.

== Sales ==
Year	China					Indonesia		Thailand
Year	iCar 03	03T	Fulwin X3	X3L	X3 Plus	Chery J6	J6T	Jaecoo 6 EV
2023	154	—	—			—	—	
2024	37,815	6,823	—			585	—	161
2025	11,844	—	1,812	2,491	2,595	5,810	260	2,996
