= Kalin Dedikov =

Bulgarian rally car driver

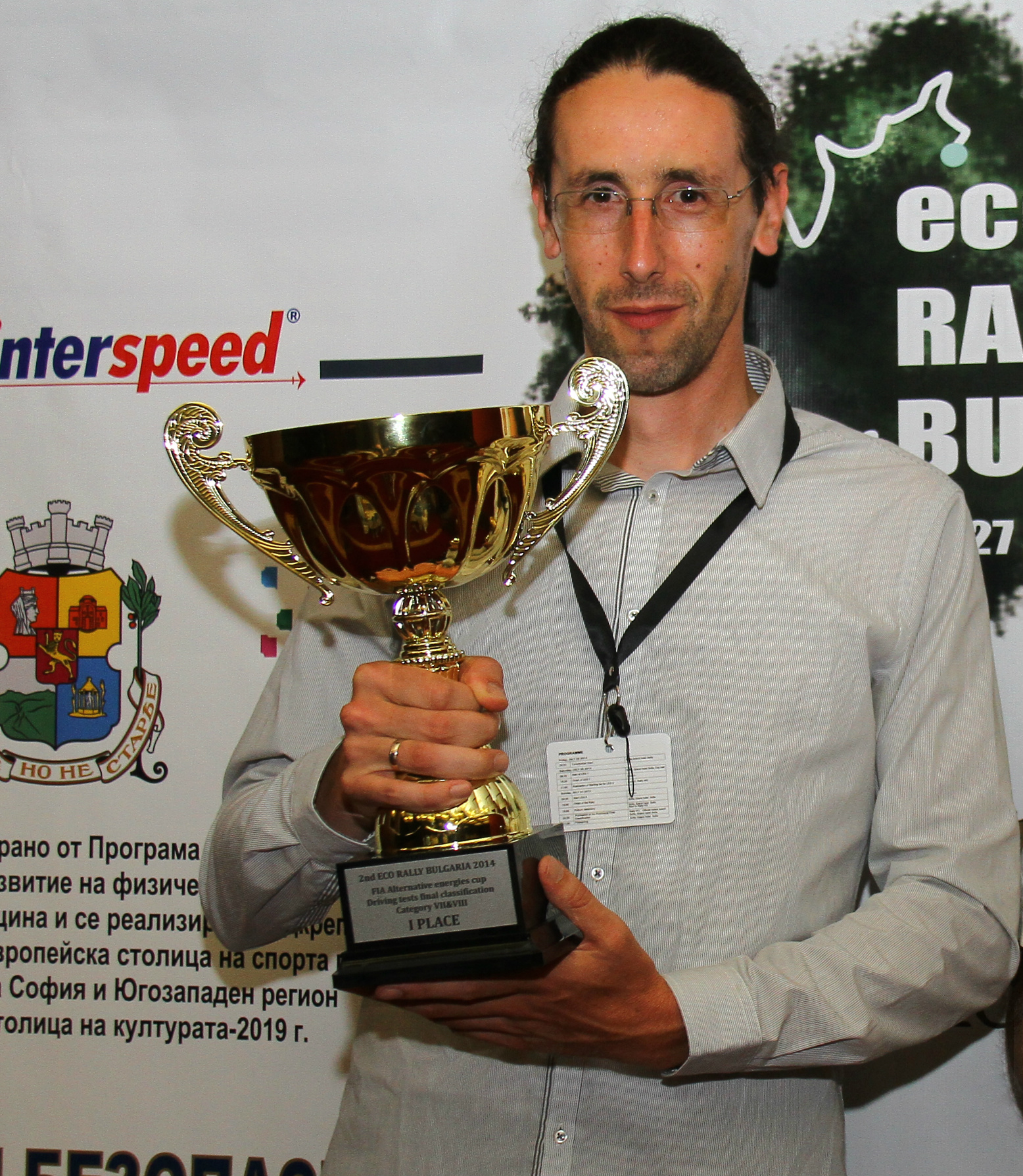
- Kalin Dedikov at the award ceremony of the Eco Rally Bulgaria 2014.
- Nationality: Bulgarian
- Born: 20 October 1977

FIA Alternative Energies Cup career
- Debut season: 2013
- Current team: Great Wall Motors

Kalin Dedikov (born 20 October 1977 in Sofia, Bulgaria) is a Bulgarian rally driver and a journalist. He has been competing in the FIA Alternative Energies Cup Championship since 2013 and in the FIA Electric and New Energies Championship since 2017.

== Rally career ==
Kalin Dedikov made his FIA Alternative Energies Cup debut on Tesla Rally Serbia in 2013 with a Dacia Logan.
During the 2013 rally season Dedikov took 12th place in the General classification together with the co-driver Nikolay Kitanov in a Dacia Logan LPG.
For the 2013 rally season Dacia took 5th place in the Manufacturer’s Cup.
In 2014 Dedikov took the third place in the General classification of the FIA Alternative Energies Cup with the co-driver George Pavlov. The team completed with a Great Wall C30. The world champion for 2014 became Massimo Liverani.
The 2015 rally season finished with an overall fourth place for Dedikov in the General classification. Together with the co-driver George Pavlov the team completed with a Great Wall C30. In the 2014 and the 2015 rally seasons the racing car Great Wall C30 of the crew Kalin Dedikov/George Pavlov took 6th and 4th place respectively in the Manufacturer’s Cup. The automobile brand Great Wall made its debut in 2014 with its participation in the Eco Rally Bulgaria.
In 2014 and 2015 the racing crew (Kalin Dedikov and George Pavlov) received the annual awards of the Bulgarian Federation of Automobile Sports-BFAS for their achievements in the Championship.

== Other rally achievements ==
First place in Tesla Rally, Serbia 2015 with the co-driver Nikolay Kitanov and in Great Wall C30.

First place in Xanthis Eco Rally, Greece 2015 with the co-driver George Pavlov in a Great Wall C30

Third place in Eco Rally Slovenia 2014 with the co-driver George Pavlov in a Great Wall C30.
