= JAC Yiwei 3 =

Battery electric subcompact hatchback

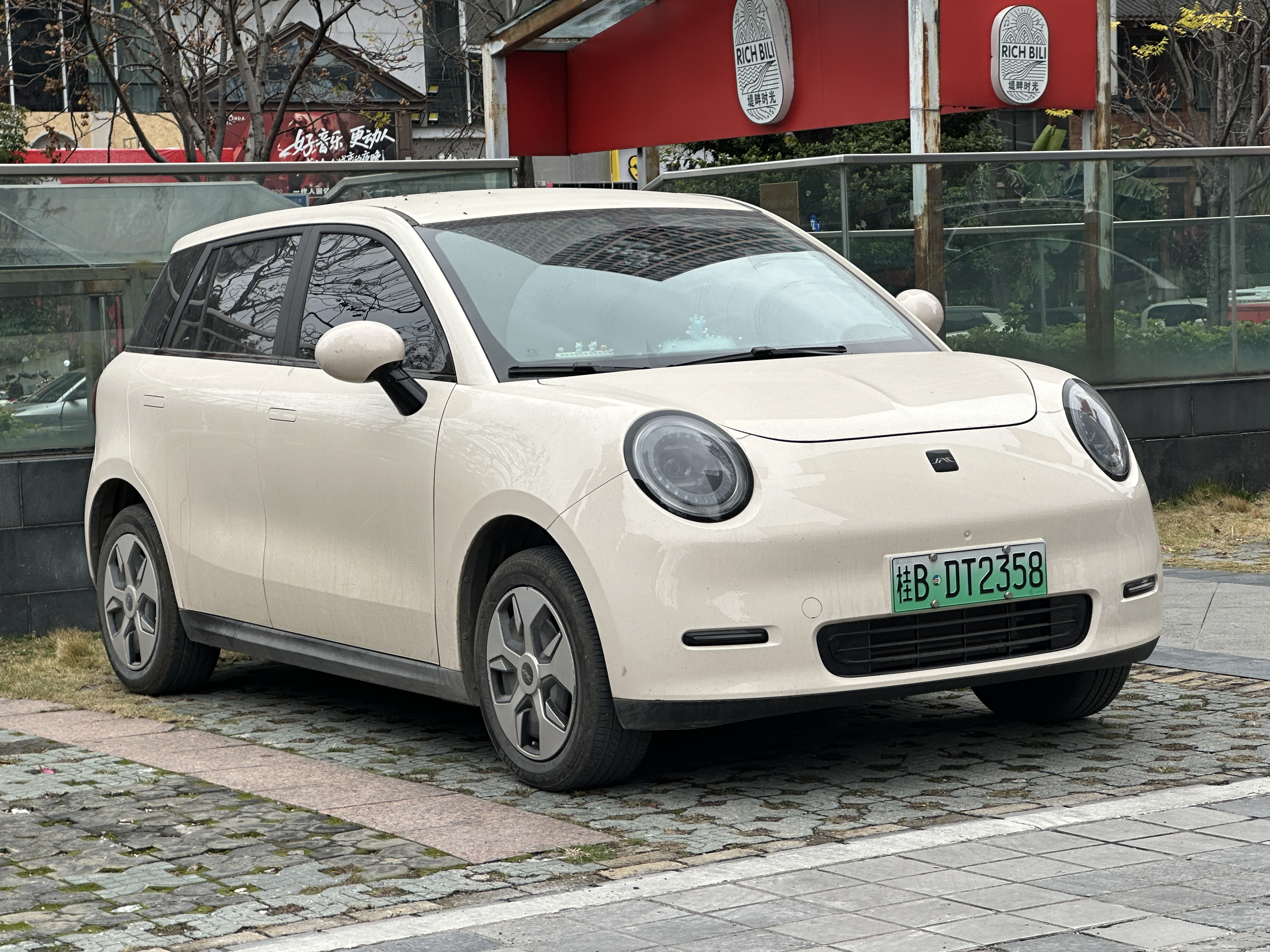

Overview
- Manufacturer: JAC Group
- Also called: JAC EV3; JAC E30X (export); JAC Ytterby (Philippines); KMC E30X (Iran); JAC EV 30X (Argentina)
- Production: June 2023 – present
- Assembly: China: Hefei; Spain: Linares

Body and chassis
- Class: Subcompact car (B)
- Body style: 5-door hatchback
- Layout: Front-motor, front-wheel-drive
- Platform: DI platform

Powertrain
- Electric motor: Permanent magnet synchronous motor
- Power output: 60 kW (82 PS; 80 hp) (34.5 kWh); 70 kW (95 PS; 94 hp) (41 kWh); 100 kW (136 PS; 134 hp) (51.5 kWh)
- Transmission: 1-speed direct-drive
- Battery: 34.5 kWh LFP; 41 kWh LFP; 51.5 kWh LFP
- Electric range: 330 km (205 mi) (CLTC, 34.5 kWh); 405 km (252 mi) (CLTC, 41 kWh); 400 km (249 mi) (WLTP, 51.5 kWh); 505 km (314 mi) (CLTC, 51.5 kWh)

Dimensions
- Wheelbase: 2,620 mm (103.1 in)
- Length: 4,025 mm (158.5 in)
- Width: 1,770 mm (69.7 in)
- Height: 1,560 mm (61.4 in)
- Curb weight: 1,270–1,445 kg (2,800–3,186 lb)

The JAC Yiwei 3, also known as the JAC EV3 or JAC E30X depending on the market, is a battery electric subcompact hatchback produced by JAC Group that was unveiled in April 2023, and has been produced since June 2023. It is the first vehicle to be sold under the JAC Yiwei sub-brand.

== Overview ==
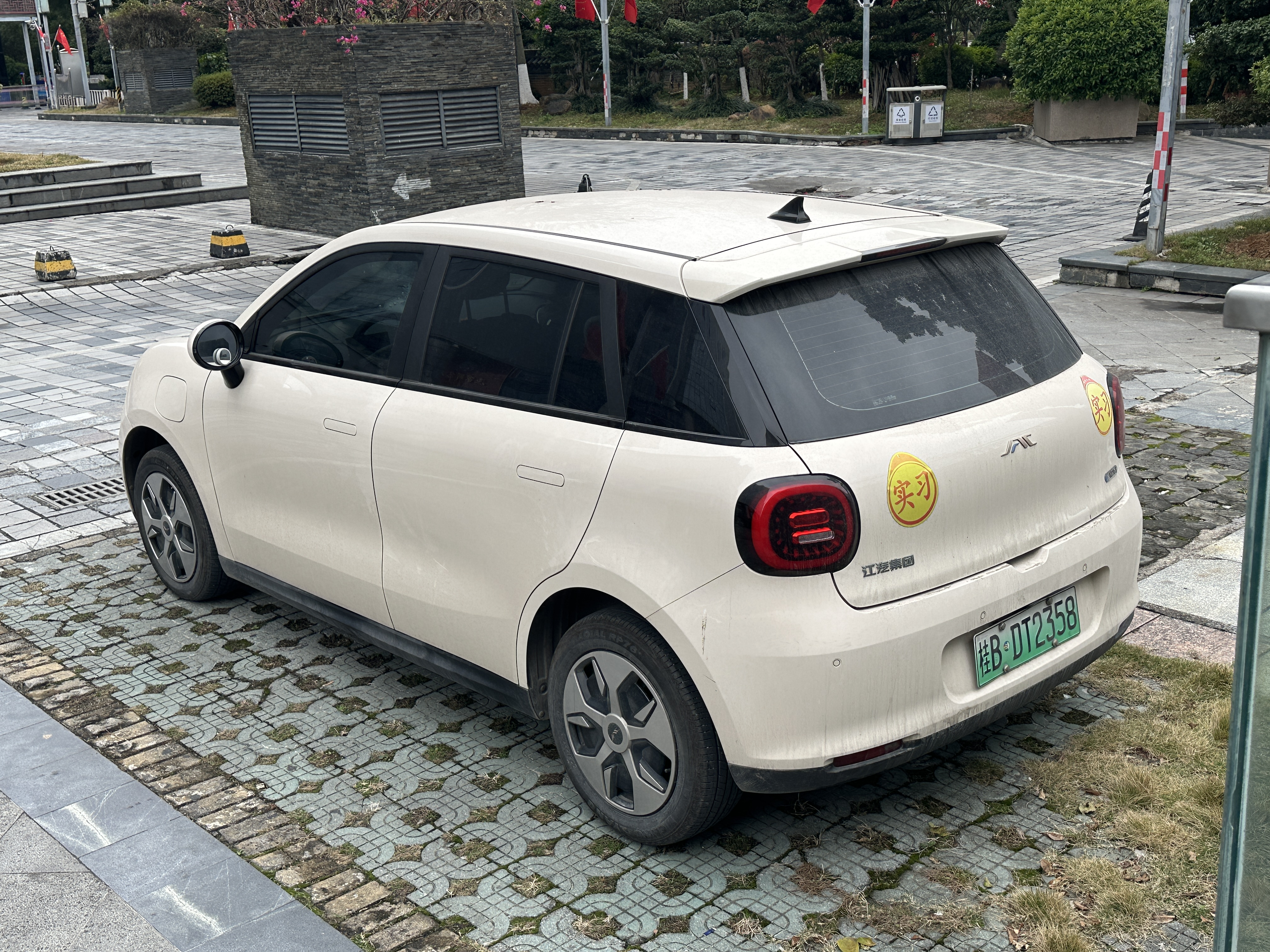
Rear view

Interior

On 12 April 2023 the JAC was announced the launch of the new Yiwei sub-brand at 2023 Auto Shanghai, and revealed a preview of its first product, the Yiwei 3. Presales for the vehicle opened a month later in May, and sales began in June 2023.

The exterior of the Yiwei 3 is available in white, beige, gray, green, and purple paint, all with a contrasting black painted roof. The circle-shaped headlight units feature daytime running lights consisting of 137 LEDs. In the Chinese market, the vehicle is badged with 'EV3' in Latin characters.

In the interior, a 6.2-inch display mounted on the steering column serves as the instrument cluster. Either a 12.8-inch or 15.6-inch touchscreen mounted on the center of the dashboard in an elevated configuration is used as the infotainment interface, and also houses most controls including HVAC settings. The center console has an open design and houses a wireless charging pad, a single retractable cupholder, and an armrest. The interior is available in several different colors, including pink with white, emerald green with grey, and lavender with black.

The Yiwei 3 has optional Level 2 advanced driving assistance functions such as autonomous parking and adaptive cruise control, along with a surround view camera system.

== Markets ==
On 21 February 2024, the JAC Motors was announced that they will export 10,000 vehicles to the GCC, Central America and South American markets.

The Yiwei 3 was launched in the United Arab Emirates on July 2, 2024 badged as the E30X and is exclusively available with the 51.5 kWh battery pack and 100 kW (136 PS; 134 hp) motor.

In November 2026, assembly using the complete knock-down method will begin at the Santana Motors plant in Linares, Spain, using kits imported from China. The car will be sold in major European markets in versions with 41 kWh and 51.5 kWh batteries (Worldwide Harmonised Light Vehicles Test Procedure combined-cycle range of 293 km and 374 km, respectively).

== Powertrain ==
The Yiwei 3 is the first vehicle built on the JAC DI platform, which will underpin following Yiwei vehicles as well. The platform uses a cell-to-body battery pack using 46mm diameter cylindrical format battery cells, and battery safety system both developed by JAC. It also uses a '9-in-1' powertrain unit, which consists of a drive motor, reduction gearbox, differential, and various high-voltage power electronics integrated into a single unit. This allows the components to occupy 40% less space, allowing for more interior space and an improved 4.95-metre (16.2 ft) turning radius.

The Yiwei 3 is powered by a 34.5, 41 or 51.5 kWh lithium iron phosphate battery battery pack using cylindrical 46-format battery cells supplied by either Gotion or JAC Huating. A version using a sodium-ion battery pack was announced at the 2023 Shanghai Auto Show, but has not yet entered production.

A variant with 600 km (370 mi) CLTC range rating is expected to be released in the future.

Specs
Model	Years	Power	Torque	0–100 km/h (0–62 mph) (Official)	Top speed
34.5 kWh	2023–present	60 kW (82 PS; 80 hp)	150 N⋅m (111 lb⋅ft; 15 kg⋅m)		135 km/h (84 mph)
41 kWh	2023–present	70 kW (95 PS; 94 hp)	135 N⋅m (100 lb⋅ft; 13.8 kg⋅m)		150 km/h (93 mph)
51.5 kWh	2023–present	100 kW (136 PS; 134 hp)	175 N⋅m (129 lb⋅ft; 17.8 kg⋅m)	7.8s	150 km/h (93 mph)

== Safety ==
C-NCAP (2021) test results 2023 JAC Yiwei 3 505km Pro+
Category		%
Overall:	5 /5 stars	86.6%
Occupant protection:		89.83%
Vulnerable road users:		67.90%
Active safety:		89.91%

== Sales ==
Year	China
2024	12,731
